= History of Virginia =

History of U.S. state

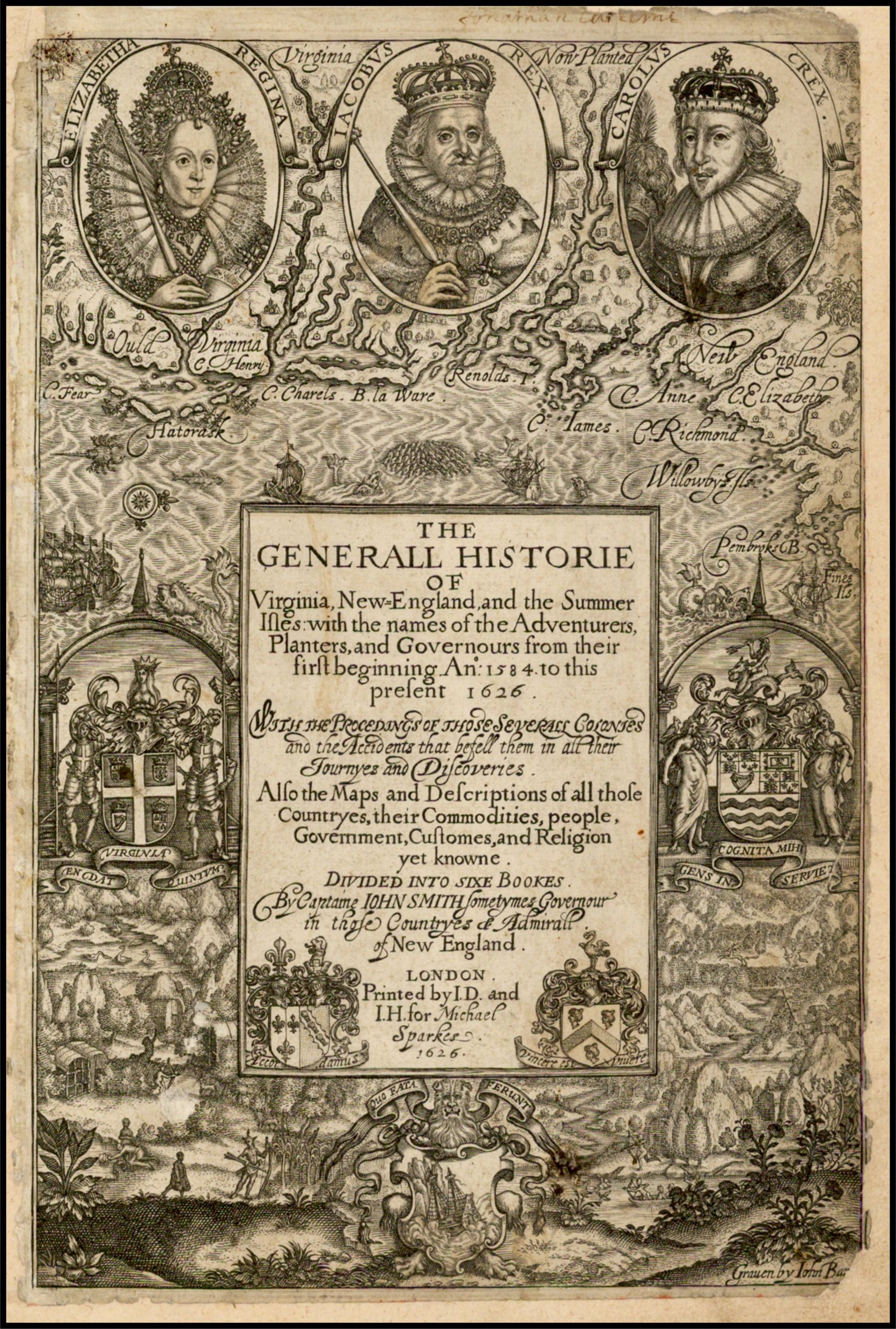
The Generall Historie of Virginia, New-England, and the Summer Isles (1624), by Capt. John Smith, one of the first histories of Virginia

The written history of Virginia begins with documentation by the first Spanish explorers to reach the area in the 16th century, when it was occupied chiefly by Algonquian, Iroquoian, and Siouan peoples. In 1607, English colonization began in present-day Virginia with Jamestown, which became the first permanent English settlement in North America.

The Virginia Company colony was looking for gold and spices, and land to grow crops, however they would find no fortunes in the area, and struggled to maintain a food supply. The settlement survived the famine during the harsh winter of 1609, which forced colonists to eat leather from their clothes and boots, and resort to cannibalism. In 1610, survivors abandoned Jamestown, although they returned after meeting a resupply convoy in the James River. Soon thereafter during the early 17th century, tobacco emerged as a profitable export. It was chiefly grown on plantations, using primarily enslaved labor for the intensive hand labor involved. After 1662, the colony turned black enslavement into a hereditary racial caste. Jamestown would serve as the Colony of Virginia's capital from 1607 to 1699, until the capital was moved to Williamsburg, Virginia, from 1699 to 1780. Since 1780, Virginia's capital city has been Richmond, Virginia.

By 1750, the primary cultivators of the cash crop were enslaved people from West Africa. While the plantations thrived because of the high demand for tobacco, most white settlers in the colony raised their families on subsistence farms. Warfare with Native American tribes in Virginia had been an ongoing factor during the 17th century. After 1700, there was continued conflict with natives east of the Alleghenies, especially in the French and Indian War (1754–1763), when the tribes were allied with the French. The Virginia Colony became the wealthiest and most populated of the Thirteen Colonies in North America with an elected General Assembly. The colony was dominated by wealthy planters, who were also in control of the established Anglican Church. Baptist and Methodist preachers brought the Great Awakening, welcoming black members, and leading to many evangelical and racially integrated churches.

In 1776, Virginia and the rest of the American Colonies, would declare independence from Great Britain, helping form the United States. Virginia planters had a major role in gaining independence and in the development of Democratic-Republican ideals of the United States. They were important in the Declaration of Independence, writing the Constitutional Convention (and preserving protection for the slave trade), and establishing the Bill of Rights. In 1780, the capital of Virginia moved to Richmond, Virginia, where it has remained since. Virginia was the tenth state to ratify the U.S. Constitution on June 25, 1788. The state of Kentucky separated from Virginia in 1792. Four of the first five U.S. presidents were Virginians: George Washington, the "Father of his country"; and after 1800, "The Virginia Dynasty" of presidents for 24 years: Thomas Jefferson, James Madison, and James Monroe.

During the first half of the 19th century, tobacco prices declined and tobacco lands lost much of their fertility. Planters adopted mixed farming, with an emphasis on wheat and livestock, which required less labor. The Constitutions of 1830 and 1850 expanded suffrage but did not equalize white male apportionment statewide. The population grew slowly from 700,000 in 1790, to 1 million in 1830, to 1.2 million in 1860. Virginia was the largest state population wise to join the Confederate States in 1861. It became the major theater of war during the American Civil War (1861–1865). Southern Unionists in western Virginia created the separate state of West Virginia in 1863. Virginia's economy was devastated during the Civil War and disrupted in the Reconstruction era (1865–1877), when it was administered as Military District Number One. The first signs of recovery were seen in tobacco cultivation and the related cigarette industry, followed by coal mining, and increasing industrialization within the state. In 1883, conservative white Democrats regained power in the state government, leading to the implementation of Jim Crow laws. The 1902 Constitution would hinder many poor white voters and effectively disfranchised blacks from voting, until federal civil rights legislation in the mid-1960s.

From the early to mid-20th century, the state was dominated by the Byrd Organization, with dominance by rural counties aligned in a Democratic party machine. Their hold was broken over their failed Massive Resistance to school integration. As with the rest of the country the Great Depression of the 1930s brought hard economic times. During and after World War II, the state's economy thrived, with a new industrial and urban base. A statewide community college system would develop during the 1960s. By the 1980s, Virginia's population growth was mainly fueled from economic growth in the Washington, D.C., area in Northern Virginia, in large part due to expansion of the federal government. The first African American governor of a U.S. state since the Reconstruction era, and first African American ever to be elected as state governor, was Virginia's Douglas Wilder in 1990.

From the late 20th century and into the 21st century, the contemporary economy of Virginia continued to grow and become more diversified, with added high-tech industries and defense-related businesses. In the 2020 U.S. census, Virginia's population reached 8.6 million people.

== Precontact ==
At the Cactus Hill site in Virginia, archaeologists have uncovered stone tools and possible hearths that suggest humans may have lived there even before the rise of the Clovis culture.

For milliennia before the arrival of the Europeans, Indigenous peoples of the Northeastern Woodlands inhabited the lands that would be named Virginia. Archaeological and historical research by anthropologist Helen C. Rountree and others has documented 3,000 years of settlement in much of the Tidewater. Even so, a historical marker dedicated in 2015 states that recent archaeological work at Pocahontas Island has revealed precontact settlement dating to about 6500 BCE.

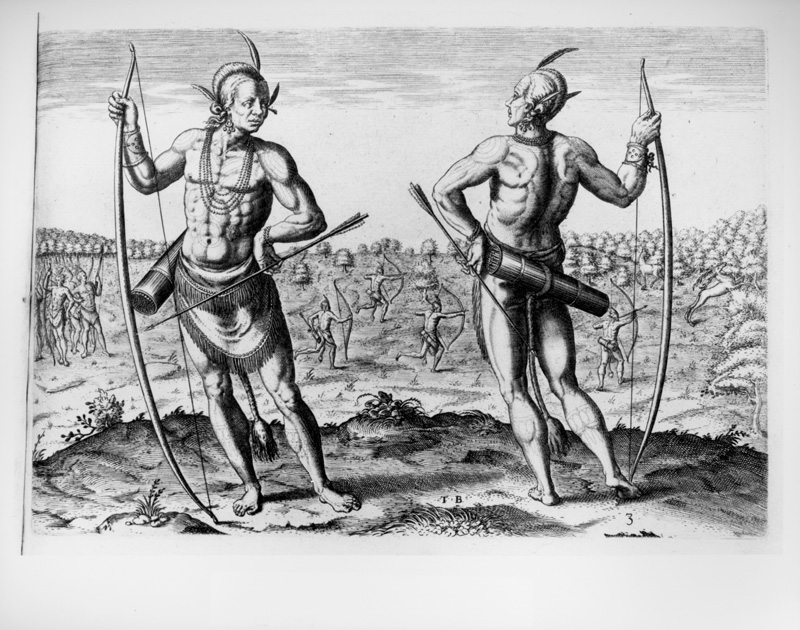
Virginia Indian chief in a deer hunting scene.

=== Indigenous peoples ===
In 16th century, what is now Virginia was occupied by three main linguistics groups: Iroquoian, Eastern Siouan, and the Algonquian. The tip of the Delmarva Peninsula south of the Indian River was controlled by the Algonquian Nanticoke. Meanwhile, the Tidewater region along the Chesapeake Bay coastline appears to have been controlled by the Algonquian Piscataway (who lived around the Potomac River), the Powhatan and Chowanoke, or Roanoke (who lived between the James and Neuse rivers). Inland were two Iroquoian tribes, the Nottoway and the Meherrin. The rest of Virginia was settled almost entirely by Eastern Siouan-speaking peoples, divided between the Monaghan and the Manahoac, who held lands from central West Virginia, through southern Virginia and up to the Maryland border. The region of the Shenandoah River Valley was controlled by a different people.

Also, communities from Mississippian cultures may have just barely crossed over into the state into its southwestern corner. Later, these tribes merged to form the Yuchi.

==== Algonquian ====
Rountree wrote that "empire" more accurately describes the political structure of the Powhatan Confederacy. In the late 16th and early 17th centuries, a chief named Wahunsunacock created this powerful empire by conquering or affiliating with approximately 30 tribes whose territories covered much of what is now eastern Virginia. Natives called the region, Tenakomakah ("densely inhabited Land"). The empire was advantageous to some tribes, who were periodically threatened by other groups, such as the Monacans. The first English colony, Jamestown, was allegedly allowed to be settled by Chief Powhatan as he wanted new military and economic advantages over the Siouans west of his people. The following chief, Opechancanough, succeeded him within only a couple of years after contact and had a much different view of the English. He led several failed uprisings, which caused his people to fracture, some tribes going south to live among the Chowanoke or north to live among the Piscataway. After that, one of his sons took several Powhatans and moved off to the northwest, becoming the Shawnee and took over former Susquehannock territories. Recorded in the states of Maryland and Pennsylvania throughout the 17th century, they eventually made their way into the Ohio River Valley, where they are believed to have merged with a variety of other native peoples to form the powerful confederacy that controlled the area that is now West Virginia until the Shawnee Wars (1811–1813). By only 1646, very few Powhatans remained and were policed harshly by the English, no longer even allowed to choose their own leaders. They were organized into the Pamunkey and Mattaponi tribes. They eventually dissolved altogether and merged into Colonial society.

The Piscataway were pushed north on the Potomac River early in their history, coming to be cut off from the rest of their people. While some stayed, others chose to migrate west. Their movements are generally unrecorded in the historical record, but they reappear at Fort Detroit in modern-day Michigan by the end of the 18th century. These Piscataways are said to have moved to Canada and probably merged with the Mississaugas, who had broken away from the Anishinaabeg and migrated southeast into that same region. Despite that, many Piscataway stayed in Virginia and Maryland until the modern day. Other members of the Piscataway also merged with the Nanticoke.

The Nanticoke seem to have been largely confined to Indian towns but relocated to New York in 1778. Afterward, they dissolved, with groups joining the Iroquois and Lenape.

The English forced the Chowanoke onto reservation lands in 1677, where they remained until the early 19th century. By 1821, they had merged with other tribes and were generally dissolved.

==== Eastern Siouan ====
Many of the Siouan-speaking peoples of the state seem to have originally been a collection of smaller tribes with uncertain affiliation. Names recorded throughout the 17th century were the Monahassanough, Rassawek, Mowhemencho, Monassukapanough, Massinacack, Akenatsi, Mahoc, Nuntaneuck, Nutaly, Nahyssan, Sapon, Monakin, Toteros, Keyauwees, Shakori, Eno, Sissipahaw, Monetons and Mohetons living and migrating throughout what is now West Virginia, Virginia, North Carolina and South Carolina. All were said to have spoken, at least two distinct languages—Saponi (which appears to be a missing link language existing between the Chiwere and Dhegihan variants) and Catawba (which is most closely related to Biloxi and the Gulf Coast Siouan languages). John Smith was the first to note two groups in the Virginian interior—the Monaghans and the Monahoacs. The words came from the Powhatan and translations are uncertain; however, Monaghan seems similar to a known Lenape word, Monaquen, which means "to scalp." They were also commonly referred to as the Eastern Blackfoot, which explains why some Saponi today identify as the Siouan-Blackfoot people, and later still as the Christannas.

As far as can be assumed, however, it seems that they were arranged thus—from east to west along the north shore of the James River, just inland of the Powhatan, would have been the Eno, Shakori and Saponi. Around the source of the river (and probably holding some of the river's islands a ways back east) should have been the Occaneechi, or Akenatsi. They were believed to have been the "grandfather" tribe of the region, a term among native peoples for any tribe highly respected and venerated for being the first or oldest people of their kind. West of the Occaneechi and primarily located in what is now West Virginia were, at least, two more tribes believed to have been related—the Moneton of the Kanawha River and the Tutelo of the Bluestone River, which separates West Virginia from Kentucky. About midway along the southern shores of the James River should have been the Sissipahaw. They were probably the only Eastern Siouan tribe in the state who would have spoken a form of Catawba language, rather than Saponi/ Tutelo. North of them were the Manahoac, or Mahock. The Keyauwee are also of note. It is difficult to say whether they were a subtribe of others mentioned, a newly formed tribe, or from somewhere else.

Originally existing along the entirety of the current western border of Virginia and up through some of the southwestern mountains of West Virginia and Kentucky, they seem to have first been driven east by the Iroquoian Westo during the Beaver Wars. Historians have since come to note that the Westo were almost definitely the Erie and Neutrals/ Chonnonton, who had conquered wide swathes of what is now northern and eastern Ohio approximately during the 1630s and were subsequently conquered and driven out by the Iroquois Confederacy around 1650. The Tutelo of West Virginia first seem to be noted as living north of the Saponi, in northern Virginia in around 1670. Later in the Beaver Wars, the Iroquois lost their new lands in Ohio and Michigan to the French and their new native allies around the western Great Lakes. Sometime during the 1680s–90s, the Iroquois started pushing south and declared war on the Saponi related tribes, pushing them down into North Carolina. It is noted in 1701 that the Saponi, Tutelo, Occaneechi, Shakori and Keyauwee were then going to form a confederacy to take back their homeland. The writer assumes that all five tribes were driven south, but the Tutelos are noted as allies from the "western mountains." This is the same year that the Iroquois surrendered to the French, but it appears that hostilities with the Saponi continued long term. The Iroquois were soon after convinced by the English to start selling off all their extended lands, which were nearly impossible for them to hold. All they kept was a string of territory along the Susquahanna River in Pennsylvania.

The Saponi attempted to return to their lands but were unable to do so. Around 1702, the Governor of the Virginia Colony gave them reservation land and opened Fort Christanna nearby. All the tribes appear to have returned, except the Keyauwee, who remained among the Catawba. They came to be known as the Christanna People at this time. This fort offered economic and educational aid to the locals, but after the fort closed in 1718, the Saponi dispersed. With continued conflicts between the Saponi and Iroquois in the region, the governors of Virginia, Pennsylvania and New York joined to organize a peace treaty, which did ultimately end the conflict. Sometime around 1722, the Tutelo and some other Saponis migrated to the Iroquoian-held Pennsylvania territory and settled there, among many other refugees of local tribes who had been destroyed, absorbed into Colonial society, or simply moved on without them. In 1753, the Iroquois reorganized them all into Tutelo, Delaware and Nanticoke Tribes, relocated them to New York and gave them full honors among the Confederacy, despite none of them being Iroquoian. After the American Revolution, these tribes accompanied them to Canada. Later, the descendants of the Tutelos migrated again to Ohio, becoming the Saponi and Tutelo Tribes of Ohio. Many of the other Siouan peoples of Virginia were also noted to have merged with the Catawba and Yamasee tribes.

==== Iroquoian peoples ====
While mainly noted in Virginia, it appears that the Tuscarora migrated into the region from the Delmarva Peninsula early in the 17th century. John Smith noted them on an early map as the Kuskarawocks. (They may have also absorbed the Tockwoghs, who also appear on the map and were most likely Iroquoian.) After an extended war with the English, the Tuscarora began leaving for New York and began merging with the Iroquois in groups around 1720, continuing approximately until the Iroquois were banished to Canada following the American Revolution.

The Meherrin aided the Tuscarora in that war but did not follow them north. In 1717, the English gave them a reservation just south of the North Carolina border. The North Carolina government contested their land rights and tried to take them away due to a surveyor's error that caused both Native and English settlers to claim parts of the reservation. However, they managed to, more or less, stay put well into the modern day. The Nottoway also managed to largely stay in the vicinity of Virginia until the modern day without much conflict or loss of heritage.

Although the Beaver Wars were primarily centered in Ohio, the Iroquois Confederacy of New York were also in a long-strung conflict with the Susquehannocks of central Pennsylvania, as was the English colony of Maryland, although the two were not known to be allies themselves. Sometime around the 1650s or 1660s, Maryland made peace with and allied themselves to the Susquehannocks, thus the Iroquois labelled them an enemy as well, despite being allied with England by this time. After ending their war with the Susquehannocks in 1674, however, the Iroquois went on a more or less inexplicable rampage against Maryland and its remaining Native allies, which included the Piscataways and the Eastern Siouans tribes. The Eastern Siouans were forced out of the state during the 1680s. After the Beaver Wars officially ended in 1701, the Iroquois sold off their extended holdings—including their land in Virginia—to the English.

In the mid 17th century, around 1655–1656, an Iroquoian group known as the Westo invaded Virginia. While many theories abound as to their origins, they appear to have been the last of the Eries and Chonnontons who invaded Ohio at the start of the Beaver Wars. The Westo seem to have pushed into southern West Virginia, then moved straight south to move on the smaller Siouan tribes of the Carolinas. In the 1680s, they were destroyed by a coalition of native warriors led by a tribe called the Sawanno. There is also a note from the Cherokee that a group of "Shawnee" were living among them in the 1660s (following the Westo invasion, but prior to their defeat), then migrated into southern West Virginia.

==== Other tribes of note ====
The first Spanish and English explorers appear to have greatly overestimated the size of the Cherokee, placing them as far north as Virginia. However, many historians now believe that there was a large, mixed race/ mixed language confederacy in the region, called the Coosa. The Spanish also gave them the nicknames Chalaques and Uchis during the 16th century and the English turned Chalaques into Cherokees. The Cherokees we know today were among these people, but lived much further south and both the Cherokee language (of Iroquoian origin) and the Yuchi language (Muskogean) have been heavily modified by Siouan influence and carry many Siouan borrow words. This nation would have existed throughout parts of the states of Virginia, Kentucky, Tennessee, North and South Carolina and Georgia, with cores of different culture groups organized at different extremes of the territory and, probably, speaking Yuchi as a common tongue.

After the Westo punched straight through them, they seem to have split along the line of the Tennessee River to create the Cherokee to the south and the Yuchi to the north. Then, following the Yamasee War (1715–1717), the Yuchi were force across Appalachia and split again, into the Coyaha and the Chisca. The French, seeing an opportunity for new allies, ingratiated themselves with the Chisca and had them relocated to the heart of the Illinois Colony to live among the Algonquian Ilinoweg. Later, as French influence along the Ohio River waned, the tribe seems to have split away again, taking many Ilinoweg tribes with them, and moved back to Kentucky, where they became the Kispoko. The Kispoko later became the fourth tribe of Shawnee.

Meanwhile, the Coyaha reforged their alliance with the Cherokee and brought in many of the smaller Muskogean tribes of Alabama (often referred to as the Mobilians) to form the Creek Confederacy. While this tribe would go on to have great historical influence to the remaining Colonial Era and the early history of the United States, they never returned to Virginia.

Furthermore, alike the Sawannos, it seems many splinter groups fractured off from the core group and moved into places like West Virginia and Kentucky. Afterwards, those lands seemed to be filled with native peoples who claimed "Cherokee" ancestry yet had no organized tribal affiliation. The descendants of those people live throughout West Virginia, Pennsylvania, Kentucky, and Ohio today. However, it also seems probable that these populations married into the surviving Monongahela and other Siouan groups, yet the populations must have been quite small on both sides to allow that these peoples never reformed a government and remained nomadic for a great deal of time afterwards.

== Early European exploration ==
After their discovery of the New World in the 15th century, European states began trying to establish New World colonies. England, the Dutch Republic, France, Portugal, and Spain were the most active.

=== Spanish ===
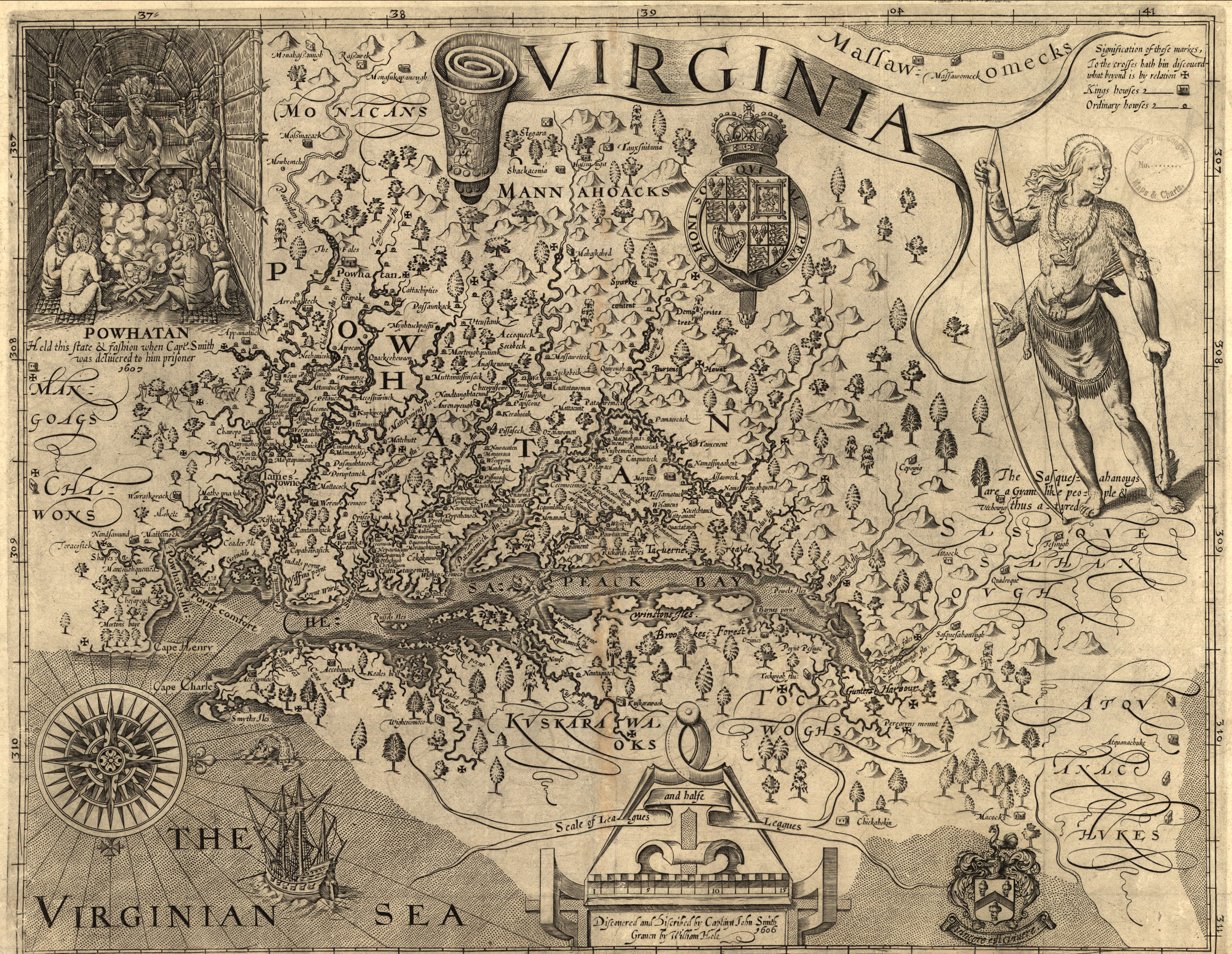
Map of Virginia published by John Smith (1612)

In 1540, a party led by two Spaniards, Juan de Villalobos and Francisco de Silvera, sent by Hernando de Soto, entered what is now Lee County in search of gold. In the spring of 1567, Hernando Moyano de Morales, a sergeant of Spanish explorer Juan Pardo, led a group of soldiers northward from Fort San Juan in Joara, a native town in what is now western North Carolina, to attack and destroy the Chisca village of Maniatique near present-day Saltville. The attack near Saltville was the first recorded battle in Virginia history.

Another Spanish party, captained by Antonio Velázquez in the caravel Santa Catalina, explored to the lower Chesapeake Bay region of Virginia in mid-1561 under the orders of Ángel de Villafañe. During this voyage, two Kiskiack or Paspahegh youths, including Don Luis were taken back to Spain. In 1566, an expedition sent from Spanish Florida by Pedro Menéndez de Avilés reached the Delmarva Peninsula. The expedition consisted of two Dominican friars, thirty soldiers and Don Luis, in a failed effort to set up a Spanish colony in the Chesapeake, believing it to be an opening to the fabled Northwest Passage.

In 1570, Spanish Jesuits established the Ajacán Mission on the lower peninsula. However, in 1571 it was destroyed by Don Luis and a party of his indigenous allies. In August 1572, Pedro Menéndez de Avilés arrived from St. Augustine with thirty soldiers and sailors to take revenge for the massacre of the Jesuits, and hanged approximately 20 natives. In 1573, the governor of Spanish Florida, Pedro Menéndez de Márquez, conducted further exploration of the Chesapeake. In the 1580s, captain Vicente González led several voyages into the Chesapeake in search of English settlements in the area. In 1609, Spanish Florida governor Pedro de Ibarra sent Francisco Fernández de Écija from St. Augustine to survey the activities of the Jamestown colonists, yet Spain never attempted a colony after the failure of the Ajacán Mission.

=== English ===
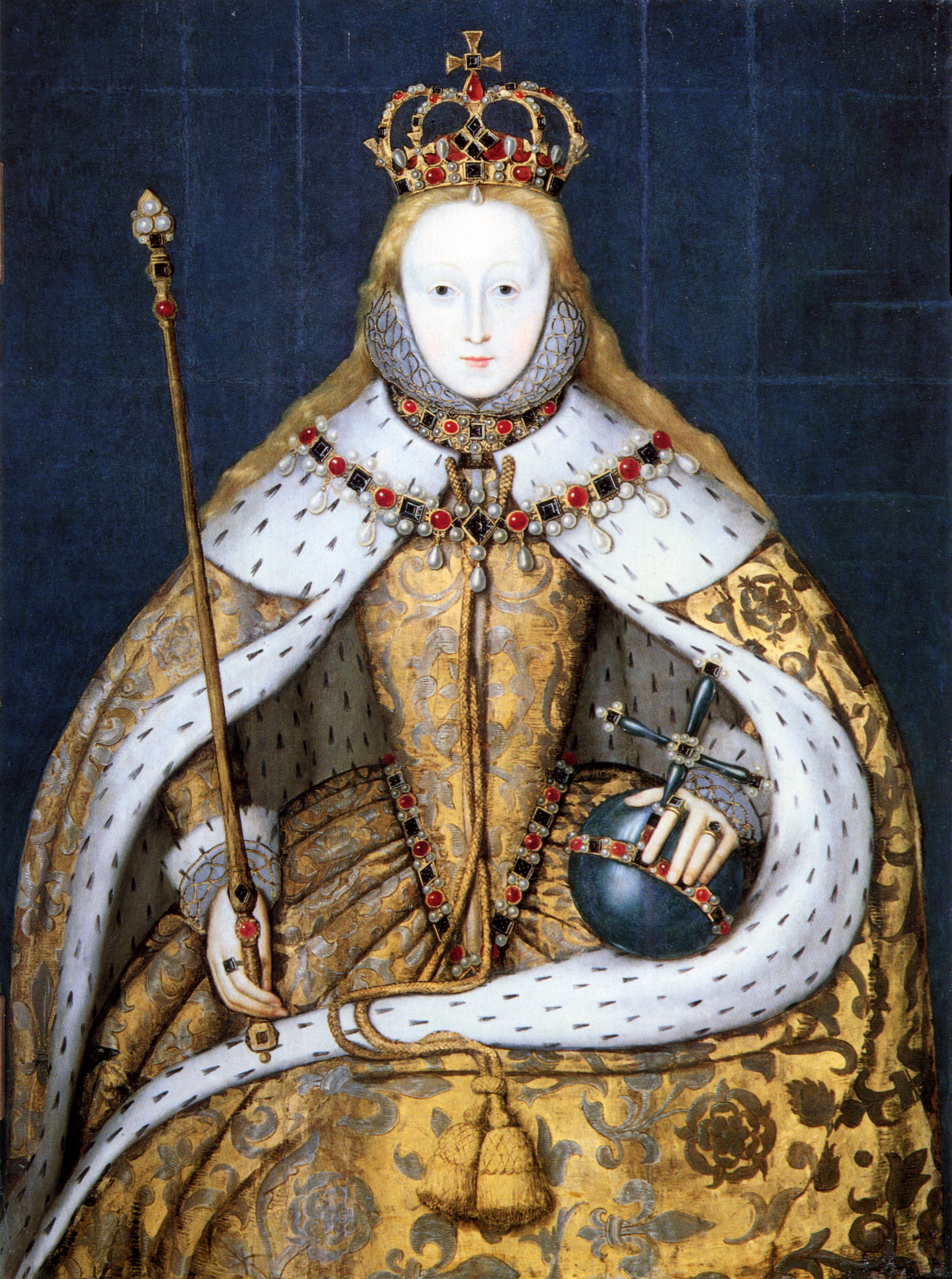
Virginia was named for Queen Elizabeth I of England, who was known as the "Virgin Queen."

The Roanoke Colony was the first English colony in the New World. It was founded at Roanoke Island in what was then Virginia, now part of Dare County, North Carolina. Between 1584 and 1587, there were two major groups of settlers sponsored by Sir Walter Raleigh who attempted to establish a permanent settlement at Roanoke Island, and each failed. The final group disappeared completely after supplies from England were delayed three years by a war with Spain. Because they disappeared, they were called "The Lost Colony."

The name Virginia came from information gathered by the Raleigh-sponsored English explorations along what is now the North Carolina coast. Philip Amadas and Arthur Barlowe reported that a regional "king" named Wingina ruled a land of Wingandacoa. Queen Elizabeth modified the name to "Virginia", perhaps in part noting her status as the "Virgin Queen." Although the word is latinate, it stands as the oldest English language place-name in the United States.

On the second voyage, Raleigh learned that, while the chief of the Secotans was indeed called Wingina, the expression wingandacoa, heard by the English upon arrival, actually meant "You wear good clothes" in Carolina Algonquian, and was not the native name of the country, as previously misunderstood.

=== Virginia Company of London ===
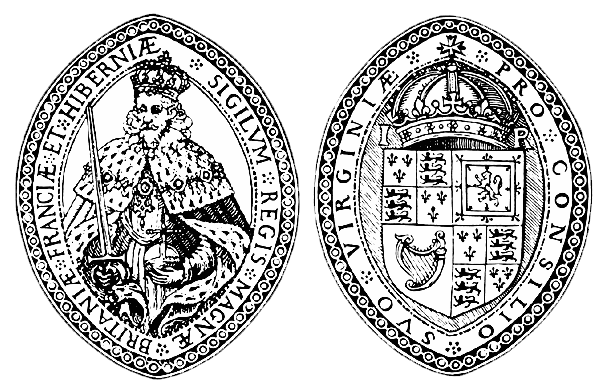
Seal of the Virginia Company of London

After the death of Queen Elizabeth I, in 1603 King James I assumed the throne of England. After years of war, England was strapped for funds, so he granted responsibility for England's New World colonization to the Virginia Company, which became incorporated as a joint stock company by a proprietary charter drawn up in 1606. There were two competing branches of the Virginia Company and each hoped to establish a colony in Virginia in order to exploit gold (which the region did not actually have), to establish a base of support for English privateering against Spanish ships, and to spread Protestantism to the New World in competition with Spain's spread of Catholicism. Within the Virginia Company, the Plymouth Company branch was assigned a northern portion of the area known as Virginia, and the Virginia Company of London area to the south.

=== Jamestown ===
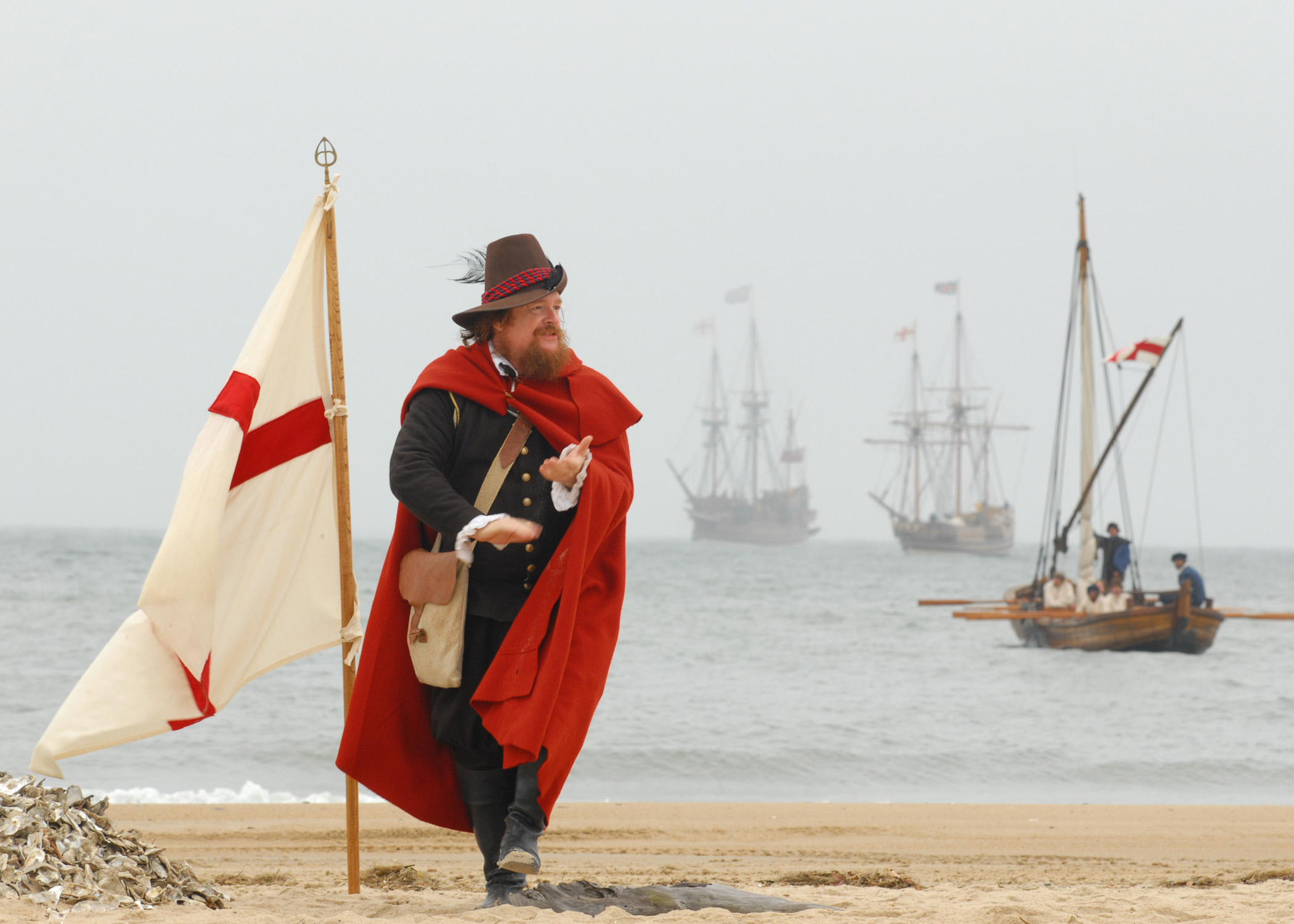
Reenactment of the first landing (Captain Smith, foreground)

==== First landing ====
In December 1606, the London Company dispatched a group of 104 colonists in three ships: the Susan Constant, Godspeed, and Discovery, under the command of Captain Christopher Newport. After a long, rough voyage of 144 days, the colonists finally arrived in Virginia on April 26, 1607, at the entrance to the Chesapeake Bay. At Cape Henry, they went ashore, erected a cross, and did a small amount of exploring, an event which came to be called the "First Landing."

Under orders from London to seek a more inland location safe from Spanish raids, they explored the Hampton Roads area and sailed up the newly christened James River to the Fall Line at what would later become the cities of Richmond and Manchester.

==== Settlement ====
After weeks of exploration, the colonists selected a location and founded Jamestown on May 14, 1607. It was named in honor of King James I (as was the river). However, while the location at Jamestown Island was favorable for defense against foreign ships, the low and marshy terrain was harsh and inhospitable for a settlement. It lacked drinking water, access to game for hunting, or much space for farming. While it seemed favorable that it was not inhabited by the Native Americans, within a short time, the colonists were attacked by members of the local Paspahegh tribe.

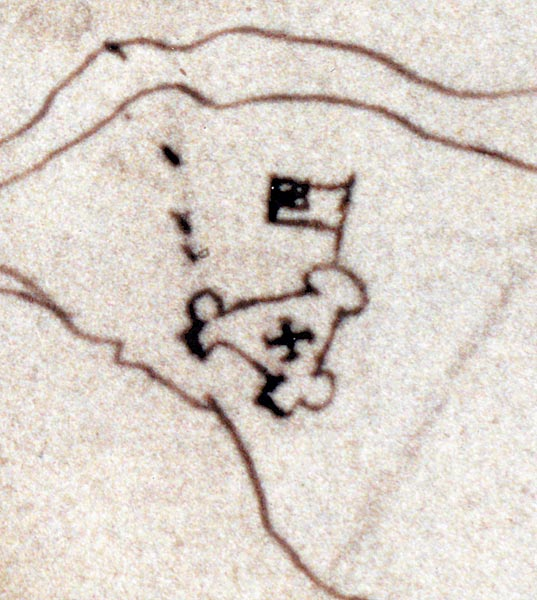
Sketch of Jamestown c.1608

The colonists arrived ill-prepared to become self-sufficient. They had planned on trading with the Native Americans for food, were dependent upon periodic supplies from England, and had planned to spend some of their time seeking gold. Leaving the Discovery behind for their use, Captain Newport returned to England with the Susan Constant and the Godspeed and came back twice during 1608 with the First Supply and Second Supply missions. Trading and relations with the Native Americans was tenuous at best, and many of the colonists died from disease, starvation, and conflicts with the natives. After several failed leaders, Captain John Smith took charge of the settlement, and many credit him with sustaining the colony during its first years, as he had some success in trading for food and leading the discouraged colonists.

After Smith's return to England in August 1609, there was a long delay in the scheduled arrival of supplies. During the winter of 1609–10 and continuing into the spring and early summer, no more ships arrived. The colonists faced what became known as the "starving time". When the new governor Sir Thomas Gates, finally arrived at Jamestown on May 23, 1610, along with other survivors of the wreck of the Sea Venture that resulted in Bermuda being added to the territory of Virginia, he discovered over 80% of the 500 colonists had died; many of the survivors were sick.

Back in England, the Virginia Company was reorganized under its Second Charter, ratified on May 23, 1609, which gave most leadership authority of the colony to the governor, the newly appointed Thomas West, 3rd Baron De La Warr. In June 1610, he arrived with 150 men and ample supplies. De La Warr began the First Anglo-Powhatan War, against the natives. Under his leadership, Samuel Argall kidnapped Pocahontas, daughter of the Powhatan chief, and held her at Henricus.

The economy of the Colony was another problem. Gold had never been found, and efforts to introduce profitable industries in the colony had all failed until John Rolfe introduced his two foreign types of tobacco: Orinoco and Sweet Scented. These produced a better crop than the local variety and with the first shipment to England in 1612, the customers enjoyed the flavor, thus making tobacco a cash crop that established Virginia's economic viability.

The First Anglo-Powhatan War ended when Rolfe married Pocahontas in 1614.

==== Plantation beginnings ====
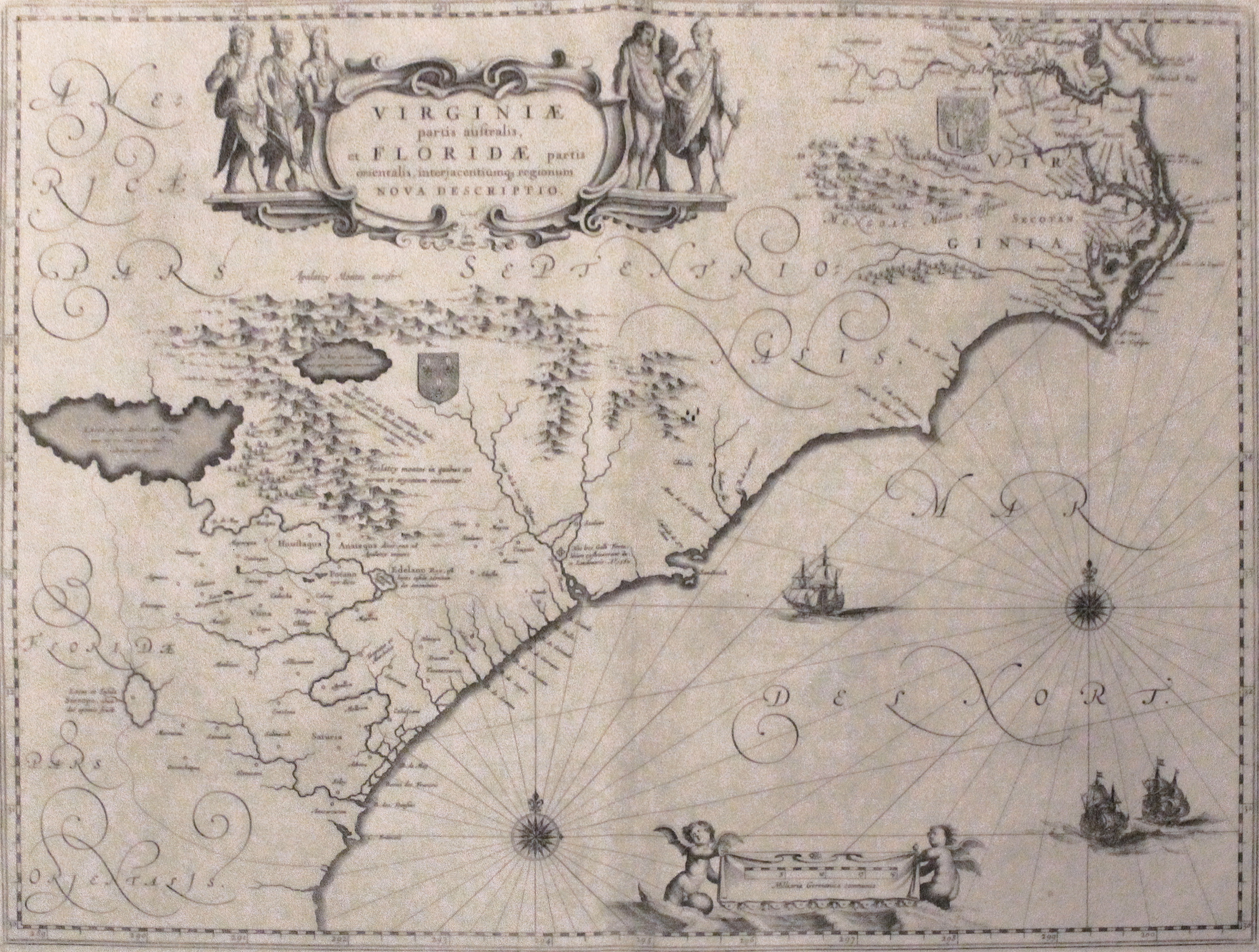
Map depicting the Colony of Virginia. Made between 1609 and 1638 by Willem Blaeu.

George Yeardley took over as Governor of Virginia in 1619. He ended one-man rule and created a representative system of government with the General Assembly, the first elected legislative assembly in the New World.

Also in 1619, the Virginia Company sent 90 single women as potential wives for the male colonists to help populate the settlement. That same year the colony acquired a group of "twenty and odd" Angolans, brought by two English privateers. They were probably the first Africans in the colony. They, along with many European indentured servants helped to expand the growing tobacco industry which was already the colony's primary product. Major importation of enslaved Africans by European slave traders did not take place until much later in the century.

In some areas, individual rather than communal land ownership or leaseholds were established, providing families with motivation to increase production, improve standards of living, and gain wealth. Perhaps nowhere was this more progressive than at Sir Thomas Dale's ill-fated Henricus, a westerly-lying development located along the south bank of the James River, where natives were also to be provided an education at the Colony's first college.

About 6 miles (9.7 km) south of the falls at present-day Richmond, in Henrico Cittie, the Falling Creek Ironworks was established near the confluence of Falling Creek, using local ore deposits to make iron. It was the first in North America.

Virginians were intensely individualistic at this point, weakening the small new communities. According to Breen (1979) their horizon was limited by the present or near future. They believed that the environment could and should be forced to yield quick financial returns. Farms were scattered and few villages or towns were formed. This extreme individualism led to the failure of the settlers to provide defense for themselves against the Indians, resulting in two massacres.

==== Conflict with natives ====
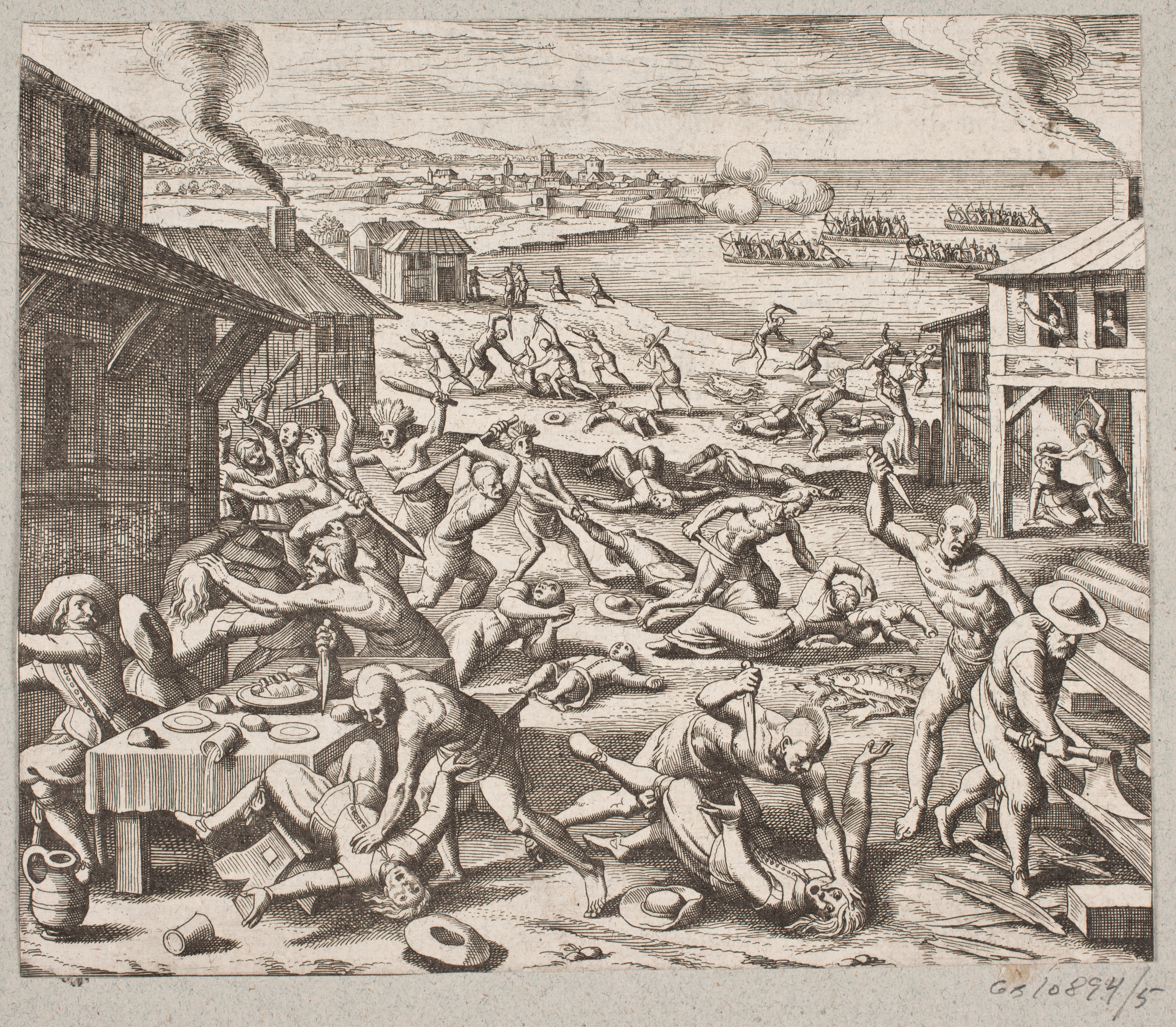
A European artist's depiction of the Indian massacre of 1622

By this time, the remaining Powhatan Empire was led by Chief Opechancanough, chief of the Pamunkey, and brother of Chief Powhatan. He had earned a reputation as a fierce warrior under his brother's chiefdom. Soon, he gave up on hopes of diplomacy, and resolved to eradicate the English colonists.

On March 22, 1622, the Powhatan killed about 400 colonists in the Indian massacre of 1622. With coordinated attacks, they struck almost all the English settlements along the James River, on both shores, from Newport News Point on the east at Hampton Roads all the way west upriver to Falling Creek, a few miles above Henricus and John Rolfe's plantation, Varina Farms.

At Jamestown, a warning by an Indian boy named Chanco to his employer, Richard Pace, helped reduce total deaths. Pace secured his plantation and rowed across the river during the night to alert Jamestown, which allowed colonists some defensive preparation. They had no time to warn outposts, which suffered deaths and captives at almost every location. Several entire communities were essentially wiped out, including Henricus and Wolstenholme Towne at Martin's Hundred. At the Falling Creek Ironworks, which had been seen as promising for the Colony, two women and three children were among the 27 killed, leaving only two colonists alive. The facilities were destroyed.

Despite the losses, two thirds of the colonists survived; after withdrawing to Jamestown, many returned to the outlying plantations, although some were abandoned. The English carried out reprisals against the Powhatan and there were skirmishes and attacks for about a year before the colonists and Powhatan struck a truce.

The colonists invited the chiefs and warriors to Jamestown, where they proposed a toast of liquor. Dr. John Potts and some of the Jamestown leadership had poisoned the natives' share of the liquor, which killed about 200 men. Colonists killed another 50 Indians by hand.

The period between the coup of 1622 and another Powhatan attack on English colonists along the James River in 1644 marked a turning point in the relations between the Powhatan and the English. In the early period, each side believed it was operating from a position of power; by the Treaty of 1646, the colonists had taken the balance of power, and had established control between the York and Blackwater Rivers.

== Royal colony ==
In 1624, the Virginia Company's charter was revoked and the colony transferred to royal authority as a crown colony, but the elected representatives in Jamestown continued to exercise a fair amount of power. Under royal authority, the colony began to expand to the North and West with additional settlements.

In 1634, a new system of local government was created in the Virginia Colony by order of the King of England. Eight shires were designated, each with its own local officers; these shires were renamed as counties only a few years later.

=== Governor Berkeley and English Civil War ===
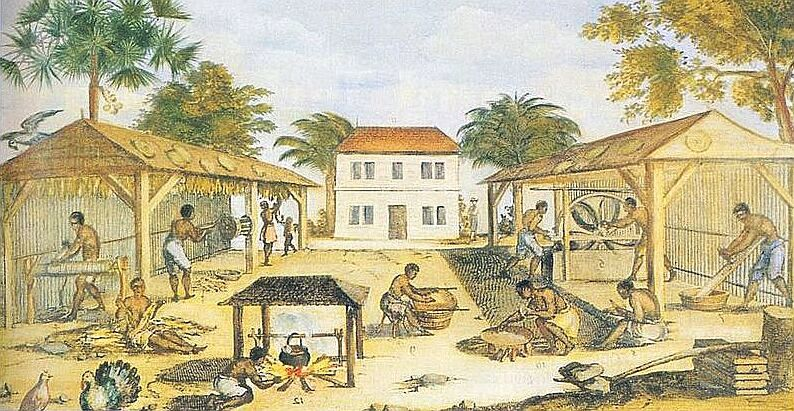
Enslaved people processing tobacco for export, 1670

The first significant attempts at exploring the Trans-Allegheny region occurred under the administration of Governor William Berkeley. Efforts to explore farther into Virginia were hampered in 1644 when about 500 colonists were killed in another Indian massacre led, once again, by Opechancanough. Berkeley is credited with efforts to develop other sources of income for the colony besides tobacco such as cultivation of mulberry trees for silkworms and other crops at his large Green Spring Plantation.

The colonists defined the 1644 coup as an "uprising". Chief Opechancanough expected the outcome would reflect what he considered the morally correct position: that the colonists were violating their pledges to the Powhatan. During the 1644 event, Chief Opechancanough was captured. While imprisoned, he was murdered by one of his guards. After the death of Opechancanough and following the repeated colonial attacks in 1644 and 1645, the remaining Powhatan tribes had little alternative but to accede to the demands of the settlers.

Most Virginia colonists were loyal to the crown (Charles I) during the English Civil War, but in 1652, Oliver Cromwell sent a force to remove and replace Gov. Berkeley with Governor Richard Bennett, who was loyal to the Commonwealth of England. This governor was a moderate Puritan who allowed the local legislature to exercise most controlling authority and spent much of his time directing affairs in neighboring Maryland Colony. Bennett was followed by two more "Cromwellian" governors, Edward Digges and Samuel Matthews, although in fact all three of these men were not technically appointees but were selected by the House of Burgesses, which was really in control of the colony during these years.

Many royalists fled to Virginia after their defeat in the English Civil War. Some intermarried with existing plantation families to establish influential families in Virginia such as the Washingtons, Randolphs, Carters and Lees. However, most 17th-century immigrants were indentured servants, merchants or artisans. After the Restoration, in recognition of Virginia's loyalty to the crown, King Charles II of England bestowed Virginia with the nickname "The Old Dominion", which it still bears today.

=== Bacon's Rebellion ===
Governor Berkeley, who remained popular after his first administration, returned to the governorship at the end of Commonwealth rule. However, Berkeley's second administration was characterized with many problems. Disease, hurricanes, Indian hostilities, and economic difficulties all plagued Virginia at this time. Berkeley established autocratic authority over the colony. To protect this power, he refused to have new legislative elections for 14 years in order to protect a House of Burgesses that supported him. He only agreed to new elections when rebellion became a serious threat.

Berkeley finally did face a rebellion in 1676. Indians had begun attacking encroaching settlers as they expanded to the north and west. Serious fighting broke out when settlers responded to violence with a counterattack against the wrong tribe, which further extended the violence. Berkeley did not assist the settlers in their fight. Many settlers and historians believe Berkeley's refusal to fight the Indians stemmed from his investments in the fur trade. Large scale fighting would have cut off the Indian suppliers Berkeley's investment relied on. Nathaniel Bacon organized his own militia of settlers who retaliated against the Indians. Bacon became very popular as the primary opponent of Berkeley, not only on the issue of Indians, but on other issues as well. Berkeley condemned Bacon as a rebel but pardoned him after Bacon won a seat in the House of Burgesses and accepted it peacefully. After a lack of reform, Bacon rebelled outright, captured Jamestown, and took control of the colony for several months. The incident became known as Bacon's Rebellion. Berkeley returned himself to power with the help of the English militia. Bacon burned Jamestown before abandoning it and continued his rebellion but died of disease. Berkeley severely crushed the remaining rebels.

In response to Berkeley's harsh repression of the rebels, the English government removed him from office. After the burning of Jamestown, the capital was temporarily moved to Middle Plantation, located on the high ground of the Virginia Peninsula equidistant from the James and York Rivers.

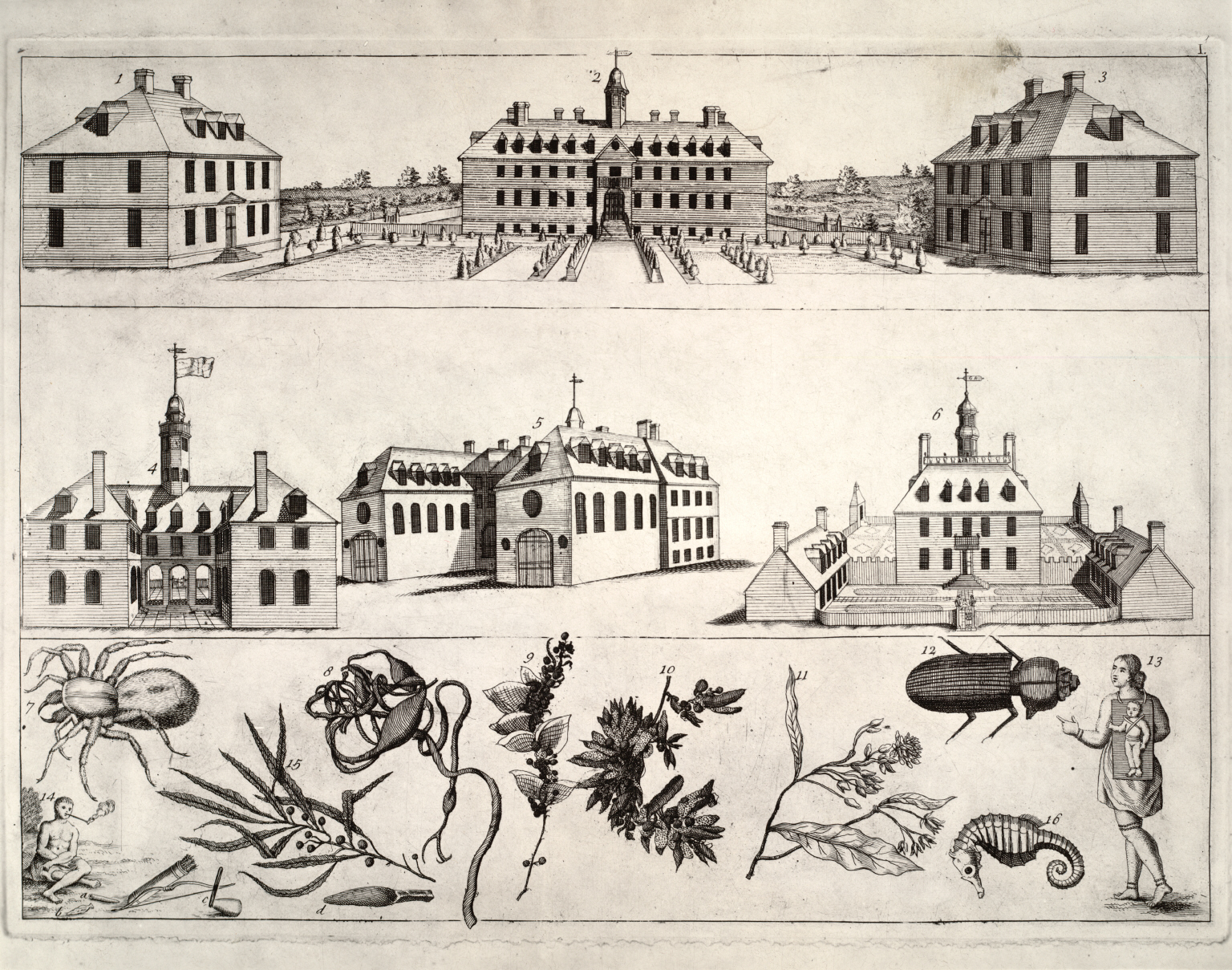
The Bodleian Plate, showing (top row; also middle row, center) the Wren Building at the College of William and Mary; (middle row left) views of the first Capitol at Williamsburg; (middle-row right) the Governor's Palace.

=== Building of Williamsburg ===
Local leaders had long desired a school of higher education, for the sons of planters, and for educating the Indians. An earlier attempt to establish a permanent university at Henricus failed after the Indian massacre of 1622 wiped out the entire settlement. Finally, seven decades later, with encouragement from the Colony's House of Burgesses and other prominent individuals, Reverend Dr. James Blair, the colony's top religious leader, prepared a plan. Blair went to England and in 1693, obtained a charter from Protestants King William and Queen Mary II of England who had just deposed Catholic James II of England in 1688 during the Glorious Revolution. The college was named the College of William and Mary in honor of the two monarchs.

The rebuilt statehouse in Jamestown burned again in 1698. After that fire, upon suggestion of college students, the colonial capital was permanently moved to nearby Middle Plantation again, and the town was renamed Williamsburg, in honor of the king. Plans were made to construct a capitol building and plan the new city according to the survey of Theodorick Bland.

=== Tobacco plantations ===
Byrd plantation, showing how imports and exports came by ship to the front door

As the English increasingly used tobacco products, tobacco in the American colonies became a significant economic force, especially in the tidewater region surrounding the Chesapeake Bay. Vast plantations were built along the rivers of Virginia, and social/economic systems developed to grow and distribute this cash crop. Some elements of this system included the importation and employment of enslaved people to grow crops. Planters would then fill large hogsheads with tobacco and convey them to inspection warehouses. In 1730, the Virginia House of Burgesses standardized and improved quality of tobacco exported by establishing the Tobacco Inspection Act of 1730, which required inspectors to grade tobacco at 40 specified locations.

=== Social structure ===
In terms of the white population, the top five percent or so were planters who possessed growing wealth and increasing political power and social prestige. They controlled the local Anglican church, choosing ministers and handling church property and disbursing local charity. They sought elected and appointed offices. About 60 percent of white Virginians were part of a broad middle class that owned substantial farms; By the second generation, death rates from malaria and other local diseases had declined so much that a stable family structure was possible. The bottom third owned no land and verged on poverty. Many were recent arrivals, or recently released from indentured servitude. Social stratification was most severe in the Northern Neck, where the Fairfax family had been given a proprietorship. In some districts there 70 percent of the land was owned by a handful of families, and three-fourths of the whites had no land at all. In the frontier districts, large numbers of Irish and German Protestants had settled, often moving down from Pennsylvania. Tobacco was not important there; farmers focused on hemp, grain, cattle, and horses. Entrepreneurs had begun to mine and smelt the local iron ores.

Sports occupied a great deal of attention at every social level, starting at the top. In England hunting was sharply restricted to landowners and enforced by armed gameskeepers. In America, game was more than plentiful. Everyone—including servants and enslaved people—could and did hunt. Poor men with a good rifle aim won praise; rich gentlemen who were off target won ridicule. In 1691, Sir Francis Nicholson, the governor, organized competitions for the "better sort of Virginians onely who are Batchelors," and he offered prizes "to be shot for, wrastled, played at backswords, & Run for by Horse and foott." Horse racing was the main event. The typical farmer did not own a horse in the first place, and racing was a matter for gentlemen only, but ordinary farmers were spectators and gamblers. Selected enslaved people often became skilled horse trainers. Horse racing was especially important for knitting the gentry together. The race was a major public event designed to demonstrate to the world the superior social status of the gentry through expensive breeding, training, boasting and gambling, and especially winning the races themselves. Historian Timothy Breen explains that horse racing and high-stakes gambling were essential to maintaining the status of the gentry. When they publicly bet a large sum on their favorite horse, it told the world that competitiveness, individualism, and materialism where the core elements of gentry values.

Historian Edmund Morgan (1975) argues that Virginians in the 1650s—and for the next two centuries—turned to enslavement and a racial divide as an alternative to class conflict. "Racism made it possible for white Virginians to develop a devotion to the equality that English republicans had declared to be the soul of liberty." That is, white men became politically much more equal than was possible without a population of low-status enslaved people.

By 1700, the population reached 70,000 and continued to grow rapidly from a high birth rate, low death rate, importation of enslaved people from the Caribbean, and immigration from Britain and Germany, as well as from Pennsylvania. The climate was mild, the farmlands were cheap and fertile.

=== Early to mid-1700s: Westward expansion ===
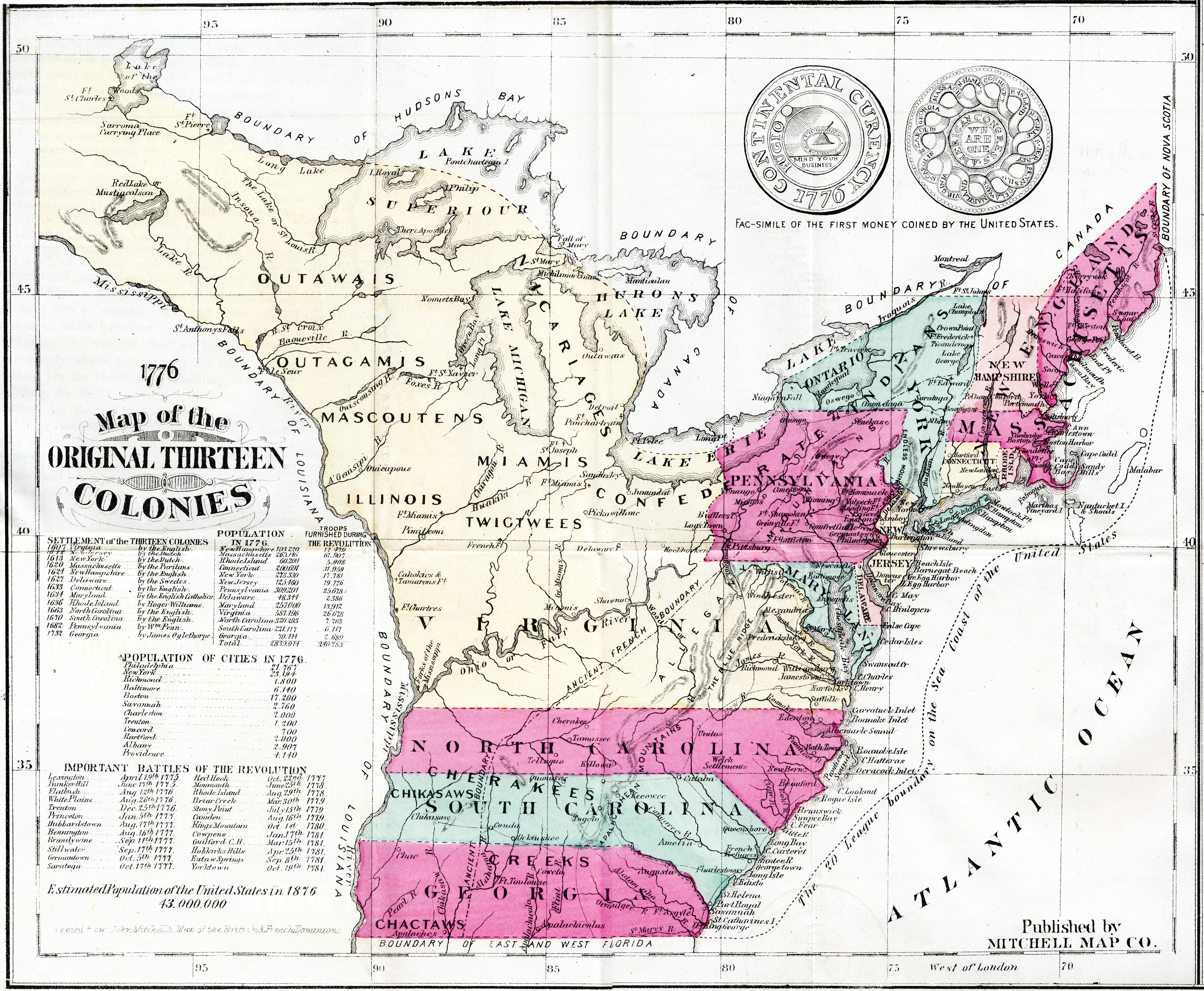
Between 1730 and 1776, the Virginia colony expanded past the Shenandoah valley to encompass modern day West Virginia, Kentucky, and most of the Northwest Territory.

1751 Fry-Jefferson map depicting 'The Great Waggon Road to Philadelphia'

In 1716, Governor Alexander Spotswood led the Knights of the Golden Horseshoe Expedition, reaching the top ridge of the Blue Ridge Mountains at Swift Run Gap (elevation 2,365 feet (721 m)). Spotswood promoted Germanna, a settlement of German immigrants brought over for the purpose of iron production, in modern-day Orange County.

A series of early explorations starting in the 1670s determined a potential route for western expansion in the Shenandoah Valley and it was determined that the region should be settled to create a protection bottleneck for the rest of the Virginia Colony from potentially hostile Natives relatively early on, but this was impeded by confused land claims between Virginia, Maryland and Pennsylvania, individual persons who had petitioned for land in the region over top of one another and failed to settle, as well as that of the remnants of the Susquehannocks themselves, living with the Iroquois Confederacy following their conquering in the 1660s, and was further complicated as the Beaver Wars spread into the region of western Virginia between 1670 and 1701. Pennsylvania usually sided with the Native claims and removed trespassers, until the Iroquois ceded all control over the region to the English in the Treaty of Albany in 1722. There were also several, small, nomadic tribes wandering the general region, collectively referred to as Cherokees and going by names such as Shenandoah, Canaragay, Tomahittan, Shattara, etc., as well as the Lenape, who had claimed land between the Potomac and Monongahela Rivers after giving up land claims in New Jersey around 1690, and would continue living there until the 1760s, when they were removed as punishment for other Lenape in Ohio attacking English settlements during the French-Indian Wars.

By the 1730s, the Three Notch'd Road extended from the vicinity of the fall line of the James River at the future site of Richmond westerly to the Shenandoah Valley, crossing the Blue Ridge Mountains at Jarmans Gap. Around this time, Governor William Gooch promoted settlement of the Virginia backcountry as a means to insulate the Virginia colony from Native American and New France settlements in the Ohio Country In response, a wide variety of settlers traveled southward on the Indian Trail later known as the Great Wagon Road along the Shenandoah Valley from Pennsylvania. Many, including German Palatines and Scotch-Irish American immigrants, settled along former Indian camps. According to Encyclopedia Virginia, "By 1735 there were as many as 160 families in the backcountry region, and within ten years nearly 10,000 Europeans lived in the Shenandoah Valley."

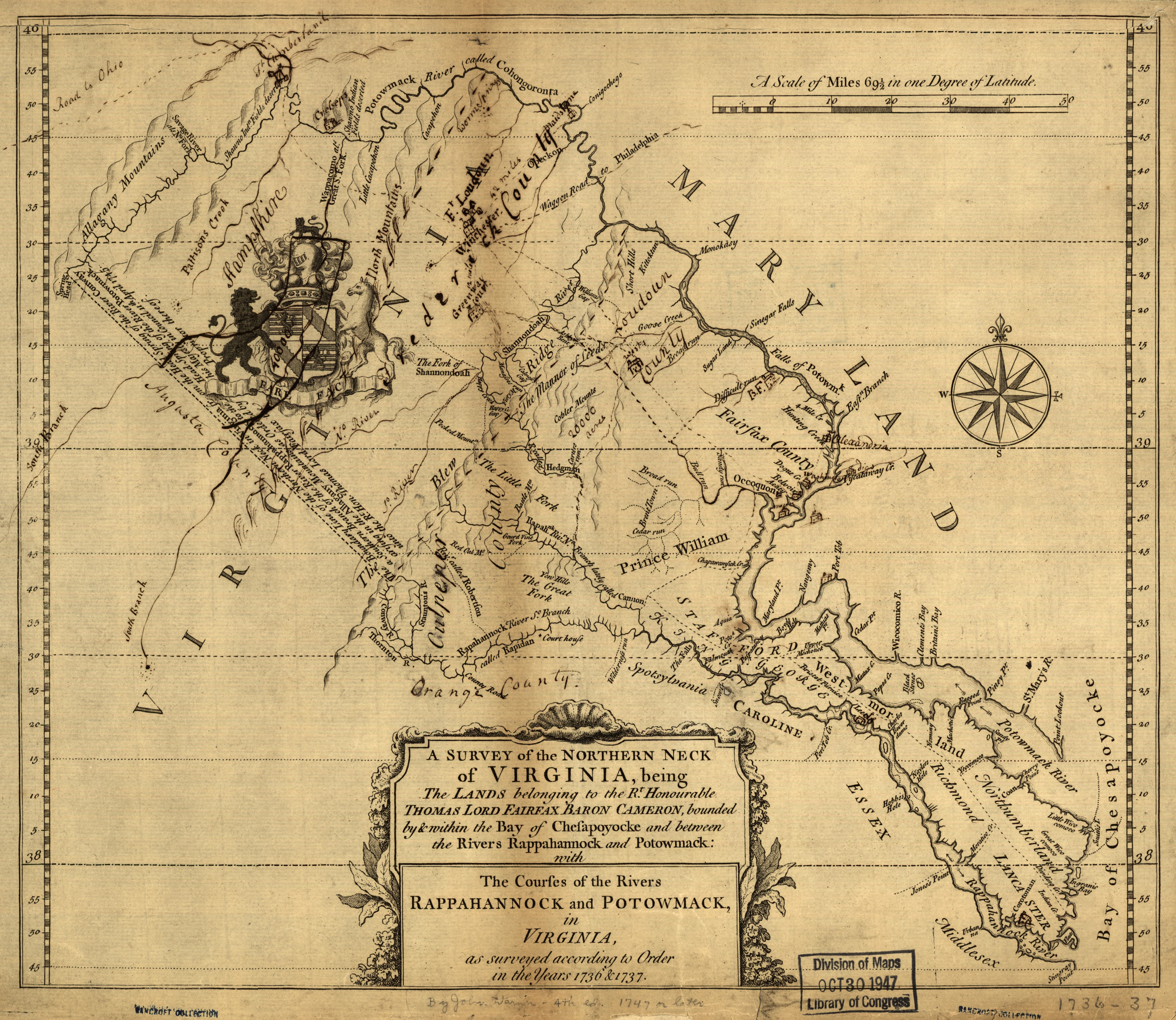
1736–37 map of the Northern Neck Proprietary

As colonial settlement moved into the piedmont area from the Tidewater/Chesapeake area, There was some uncertainty as to the exact tax boundaries of Virginia land versus the Land patent quit-rent rights held by Thomas Fairfax, 6th Lord Fairfax of Cameron in the Northern Neck Proprietary. When Robert "King" Carter died in 1732, Lord Fairfax read about his vast wealth in The Gentleman's Magazine and decided to settle the matter himself by coming to Virginia. Lord Fairfax travelled to Virginia for the first time between 1735 and 1737 to inspect and protect his lands. He employed a young George Washington (Washington's first employment) to survey his lands lying west of the Blue Ridge. Once this legal battle was ironed out, Frederick County, Virginia, was founded in 1743 and the "Frederick Town" settlements there became a fourth city charter in Virginia, now known as Winchester, Virginia, in February 1752.

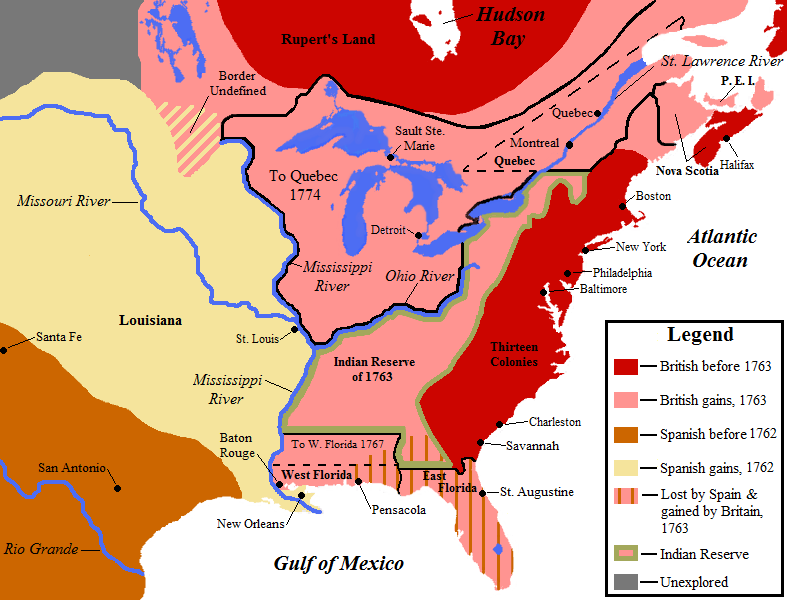
New borders drawn by the Royal Proclamation of 1763.

In the late 1740s and the second half of the 18th century, the British angled for control of the Ohio Country. Virginians Thomas Lee and brothers Lawrence and Augustine Washington organized the Ohio Company to represent the prospecting and trading interests of Virginian investors. In 1749, the British Crown, via the colonial government of Virginia, granted the Ohio Company a great deal of this territory on the condition that it be settled by British colonists. Governor Robert Dinwiddie of Virginia was an investor in the Ohio Company, which stood to lose money if the French held their claim. To counter the French military presence in Ohio, in October 1753 Dinwiddie ordered the 21-year-old Major George Washington (whose brother was another Ohio Company investor) of the Virginia Regiment to warn the French to leave Virginia territory. Ultimately, many Virginians were caught up in the resulting French and Indian War that occurred 1754–1763. At the completion of the war, the Royal Proclamation of 1763 forbade all British settlement past a line drawn along the Appalachian Mountains, with the land west of the Proclamation Line known as the Indian Reserve.

British colonists and land speculators objected to the proclamation boundary since the British government had already assigned land grants to them. Many settlements already existed beyond the proclamation line, some of which had been temporarily evacuated during Pontiac's War, and there were many already granted land claims yet to be settled. For example, George Washington and his Virginia soldiers had been granted lands past the boundary. Prominent American colonials joined with the land speculators in Britain to lobby the government to move the line further west. Their efforts were successful, and the boundary line was adjusted in a series of treaties with the Native Americans. In 1768, the Treaty of Fort Stanwix and the Treaty of Hard Labour, followed in 1770 by the Treaty of Lochaber, opened much of what is now Kentucky and West Virginia to British settlement within the Virginia Colony. However, the Northwest Territories north of the Ohio continued to be occupied by native tribes until US forces drove them out in the early decades of the 1800s.

== Religion ==
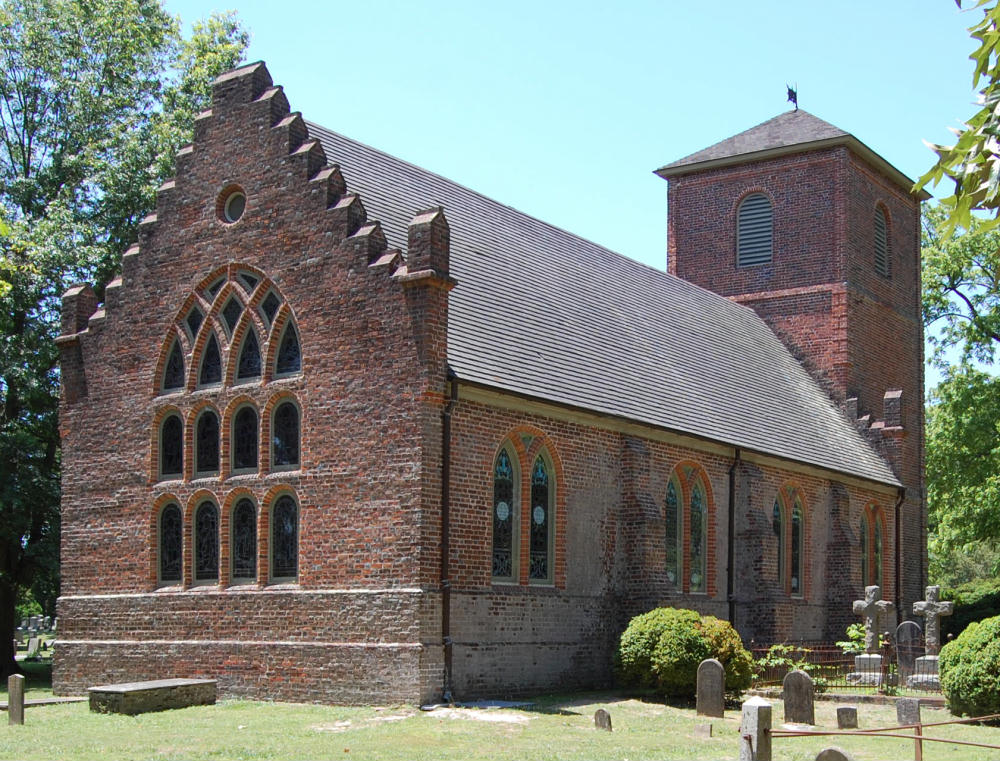
St. Luke's Church in Smithfield, built in the early- to mid-17th century, is the oldest extant brick church in the Thirteen colonies, and the only existing Gothic brick structure in the United States.

The Church of England was legally established in the colony in 1619, and the Bishop of London sent in 22 Anglican clergyman by 1624. In practice, establishment meant that local taxes were funneled through the local parish to handle the needs of local government, such as roads and poor relief, in addition to the salary of the minister. There never was a bishop in colonial Virginia, and in practice the local vestry, consisting of gentry laymen controlled the parish. By the 1740s, the Anglicans had about 70 parish priests around the colony.

Missionaries were sent to the Indians but they had little success apart from the Nansemond tribe, which had converted in 1638. The other Powhatan tribes converted to Christianity around 1791.

The stress on personal piety opened the way for the First Great Awakening in the mid 18th century, which pulled people away from the formal rituals of the established church. Especially in the back country, most families had no religious affiliation whatsoever and their low moral standards were shocking to proper Englishmen. The Baptists, Methodists, Presbyterians and other evangelicals directly challenged these lax moral standards and refused to tolerate them in their ranks. Baptists, German Lutherans and Presbyterians, funded their own ministers, and favored disestablishment of the Anglican church.

The spellbinding preacher Samuel Davies led the Presbyterians, and converted hundreds of slaves. By the 1760s Baptists were drawing Virginians, especially poor white farmers, into a new, much more democratic religion. Slaves were welcome at the services and many became Baptists at this time. Methodist missionaries were also active in the late colonial period. Methodists encouraged an end to slavery, and welcomed free blacks and slaves into active roles in the congregations.

The Baptists and Presbyterians were subject to many legal constraints and faced growing persecution; between 1768 and 1774, about half of the Baptists ministers in Virginia were jailed for preaching, in defiance of England's Act of Toleration of 1689 that guaranteed freedom of worship for Protestants. At the start of the Revolution, the Anglican Patriots realized that they needed dissenter support for effective wartime mobilization, so they met most of the dissenters' demands in return for their support of the war effort.

Historians have debated the implications of the religious rivalries for the American Revolution. The struggle for religious toleration was played out during the American Revolution, as the Baptists, in alliance with Thomas Jefferson and James Madison, worked successfully to disestablish the Anglican church. After the American victory in the war, the Anglican establishment sought to reintroduce state support for religion. This effort failed when non-Anglicans gave their support to Jefferson's "Bill for Establishing Religious Freedom", which eventually became law in 1786 as the Virginia Statute for Religious Freedom. With freedom of religion the new watchword, the Church of England was dis-established in Virginia. It was rebuilt as the Episcopal Church in the United States, with no connection to Britain.

== American Revolution ==
=== Antecedents ===
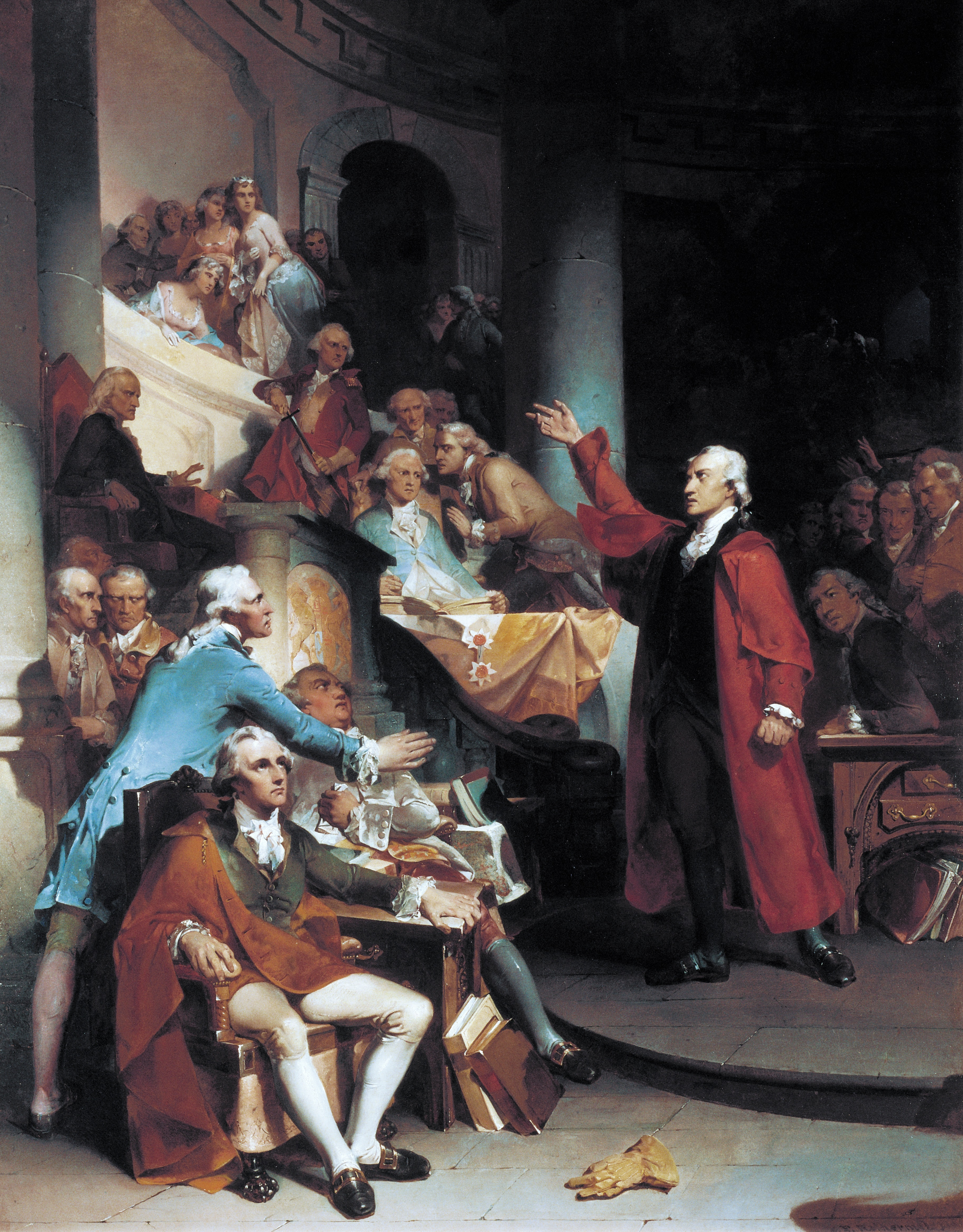
Patrick Henry's speech on the Virginia Resolves.

Revolutionary sentiments first began appearing in Virginia shortly after the French and Indian War ended in 1763. The Virginia legislature had passed the Two-Penny Act to stop clerical salaries from inflating. King George III vetoed the measure, and clergy sued for back salaries. Patrick Henry first came to prominence by arguing in the case of Parson's Cause against the veto, which he declared tyrannical.

The British government had accumulated a great deal of debt through spending on its wars. To help payoff this debt, Parliament passed the Sugar Act in 1764 and the Stamp Act in 1765. The General Assembly opposed the passage of the Sugar Act on the grounds of no taxation without representation, and in turn passing the "Virginia Resolves" opposing the tax. Governor Francis Fauquier responded by dismissing the Assembly. The Northampton County court overturned the Stamp Act February 8, 1766. Various political groups, including the Sons of Liberty met and issued protests against the act. Most notably, Richard Bland published a pamphlet entitled An Enquiry into the Rights of The British Colonies, setting forth the principle that Virginia was a part of the British Empire, not the Kingdom of Great Britain, so it only owed allegiance to the Crown, not Parliament.

The Stamp Act was repealed, but additional taxation from the Revenue Act and the 1769 attempt to transport Bostonian rioters to London for trial incited more protest from Virginia. The Assembly met to consider resolutions condemning on the transport of the rioters, but Governor Botetourt, while sympathetic, dissolved the legislature. The Burgesses reconvened in Raleigh Tavern and made an agreement to ban British imports. Britain gave up the attempt to extradite the prisoners and lifted all taxes except the tax on tea in 1770.

In 1773, because of a renewed attempt to extradite Americans to Britain, Richard Henry Lee, Thomas Jefferson, Patrick Henry, George Mason, and others in the legislature created a committee of correspondence to deal with problems with Britain. This committee would serve as the foundation for Virginia's role in the American Revolution.

After the House of Burgesses expressed solidarity with the actions in Massachusetts, the Governor, Lord Dunmore, again dissolved the legislature. The first Virginia Convention was held August 1–6 to respond to the growing crisis. The convention approved a boycott of British goods and elected delegates to the Continental Congress.

=== War begins ===
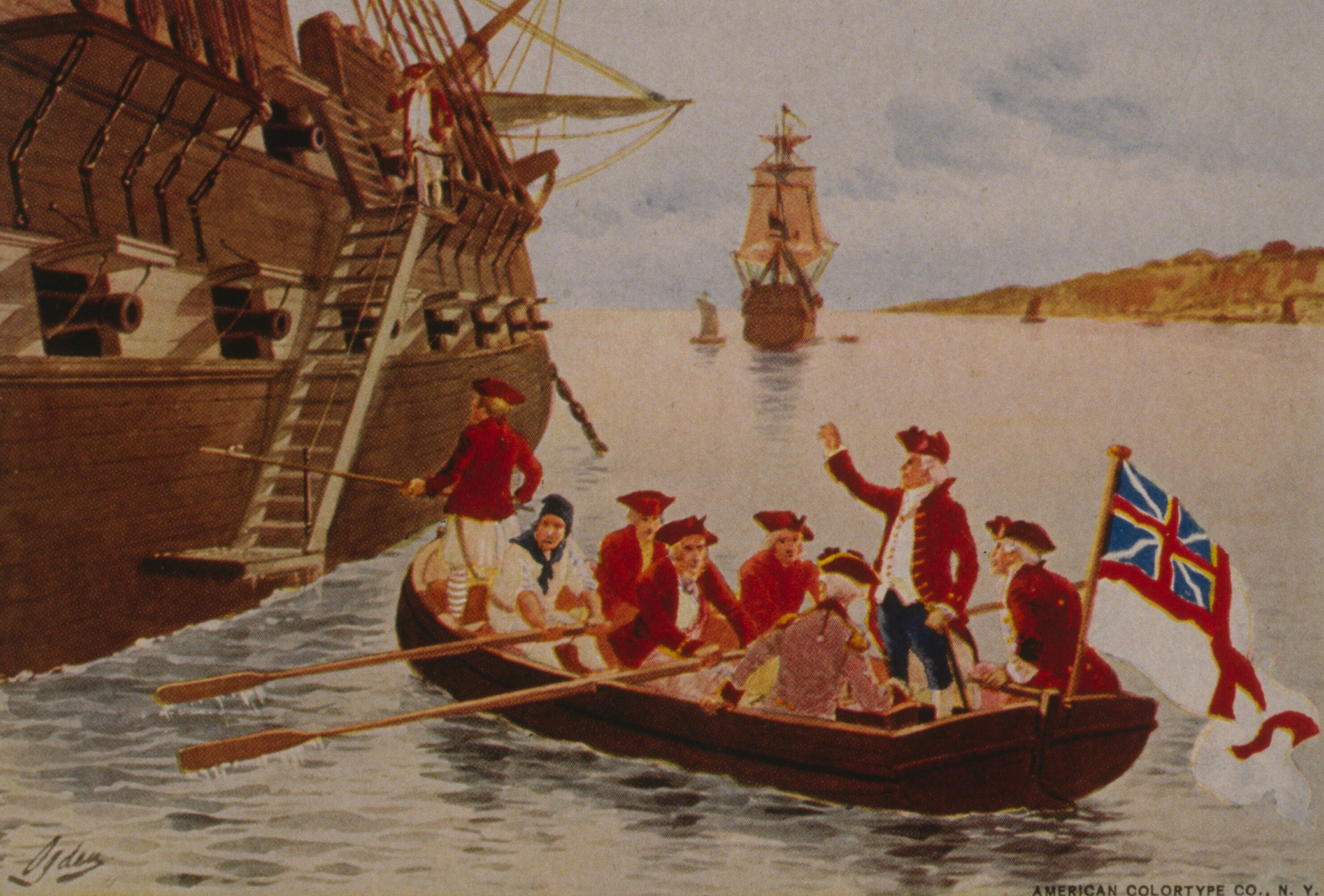
Dunmore fleeing to HMS Fowey on 8 June 1775

On April 20, 1775, Dunmore ordered the gunpowder removed from the Williamsburg Magazine to a British ship. Patrick Henry led a group of Virginia militia from Hanover in response to Dunmore's order. Carter Braxton negotiated a resolution to the Gunpowder Incident by transferring royal funds as payment for the powder. The incident exacerbated Dunmore's declining popularity. He fled the Governor's Palace to a British ship at Yorktown. On November 7, Dunmore issued a proclamation declaring Virginia was in a state of rebellion. By this time, George Washington had been appointed head of the American forces by the Continental Congress and Virginia was under the political leadership of a Committee of Safety formed by the Third Virginia Convention in the governor's absence.

On December 9, 1775, Virginia militia moved on the governor's forces at the Battle of Great Bridge, winning a victory in the small action there. Dunmore responded by bombarding Norfolk with his ships on January 1, 1776. After the Battle of Great Bridge, little military conflict took place on Virginia soil for the first part of the American Revolutionary War. Nevertheless, Virginia sent forces to help in the fighting to the North and South, as well as the frontier in the northwest.

=== Independence ===
The Fifth Virginia Convention met on May 6 and declared Virginia a free and independent state on May 15, 1776. The convention instructed its delegates to introduce a resolution for independence at the Continental Congress. Richard Henry Lee introduced the measure on June 7. While the Congress debated, the Virginia Convention adopted George Mason's Bill of Rights (June 12) and a constitution (June 29) which established an independent commonwealth. Congress approved Lee's proposal on July 2 and approved Jefferson's Declaration of Independence on July 4. The constitution of the Fifth Virginia Convention created a system of government for the state that would last for 54 years, and converting House of Burgesses into a bicameral legislature with both a House of Delegates and a Senate. Patrick Henry serves as the first Governor of the Commonwealth (1776–1779).

=== War returns to Virginia ===
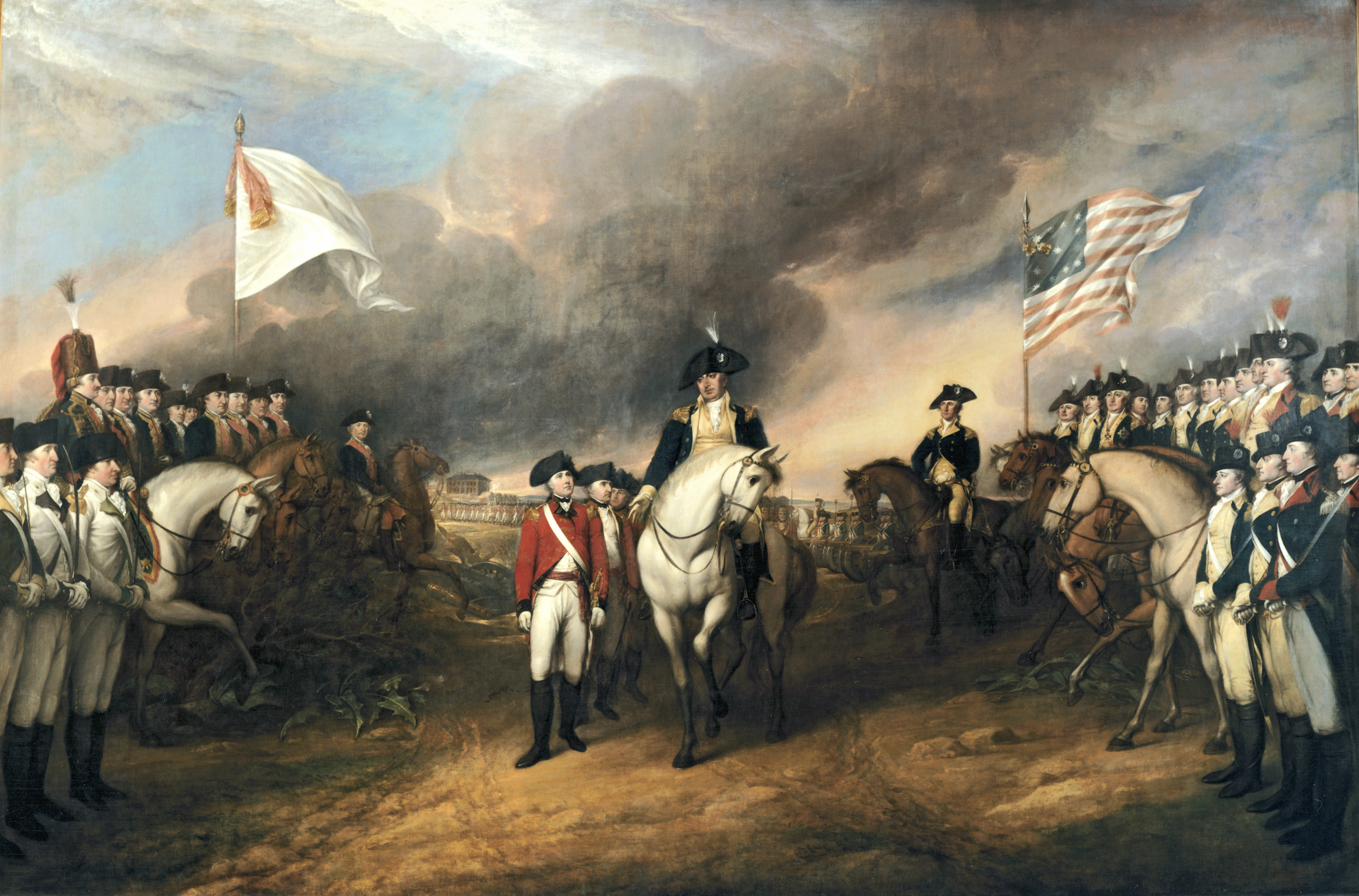
Surrender of Cornwallis at Yorktown (John Trumbull, 1797)

The British briefly brought the war back to coastal Virginia in May 1779. Fearing the vulnerability of Williamsburg, Governor Thomas Jefferson moved the capital farther inland to Richmond in 1780. However, in December, Benedict Arnold, who had betrayed the Revolution and become a general for the British, attacked Richmond and burned part of the city before the Virginia Militia drove his army out of the city.

Arnold moved his base of operations to Portsmouth and was later joined by troops under General William Phillips. Phillips led an expedition that destroyed military and economic targets, against ineffectual militia resistance. The state's defenses, led by General Baron von Steuben, put up resistance in the April 1781 Battle of Blandford, but were forced to retreat. The French General Lafayette and his forces arrived to help defend Virginia, and though outnumbered, engaged British forces under General Charles Cornwallis in a series of skirmishes to help reduce their effectiveness. Cornwallis dispatched two smaller missions under Colonel John Graves Simcoe and Colonel Banastre Tarleton to march on Charlottesville and capture Gov. Jefferson and the legislature, though was foiled when Jack Jouett rode to warn Virginia government.

Cornwallis moved down the Virginia Peninsula towards the Chesapeake Bay, where Clinton planned to extract part of the army for a siege of New York City. After surprising American forces at the Battle of Green Spring on July 6, 1781, Cornwallis received orders to move his troops to the port town of Yorktown and begin construction of fortifications and a naval yard, though when discovered American forces surrounded the town. Gen. Washington and his French ally Rochambeau moved their forces from New York to Virginia. The defeat of the Royal Navy by Admiral de Grasse at the Battle of the Virginia Capes ensured French dominance of the waters around Yorktown, thereby preventing Cornwallis from receiving troops or supplies and removing the possibility of evacuation. Following the two-week siege to Yorktown, Cornwallis decided to surrender. Papers for surrender were officially signed on October 19.

As a result of the defeat, the king lost control of Parliament and the new British government offered peace in April 1782. The Treaty of Paris of 1783 officially ended the war.

== Early Republic and antebellum period ==
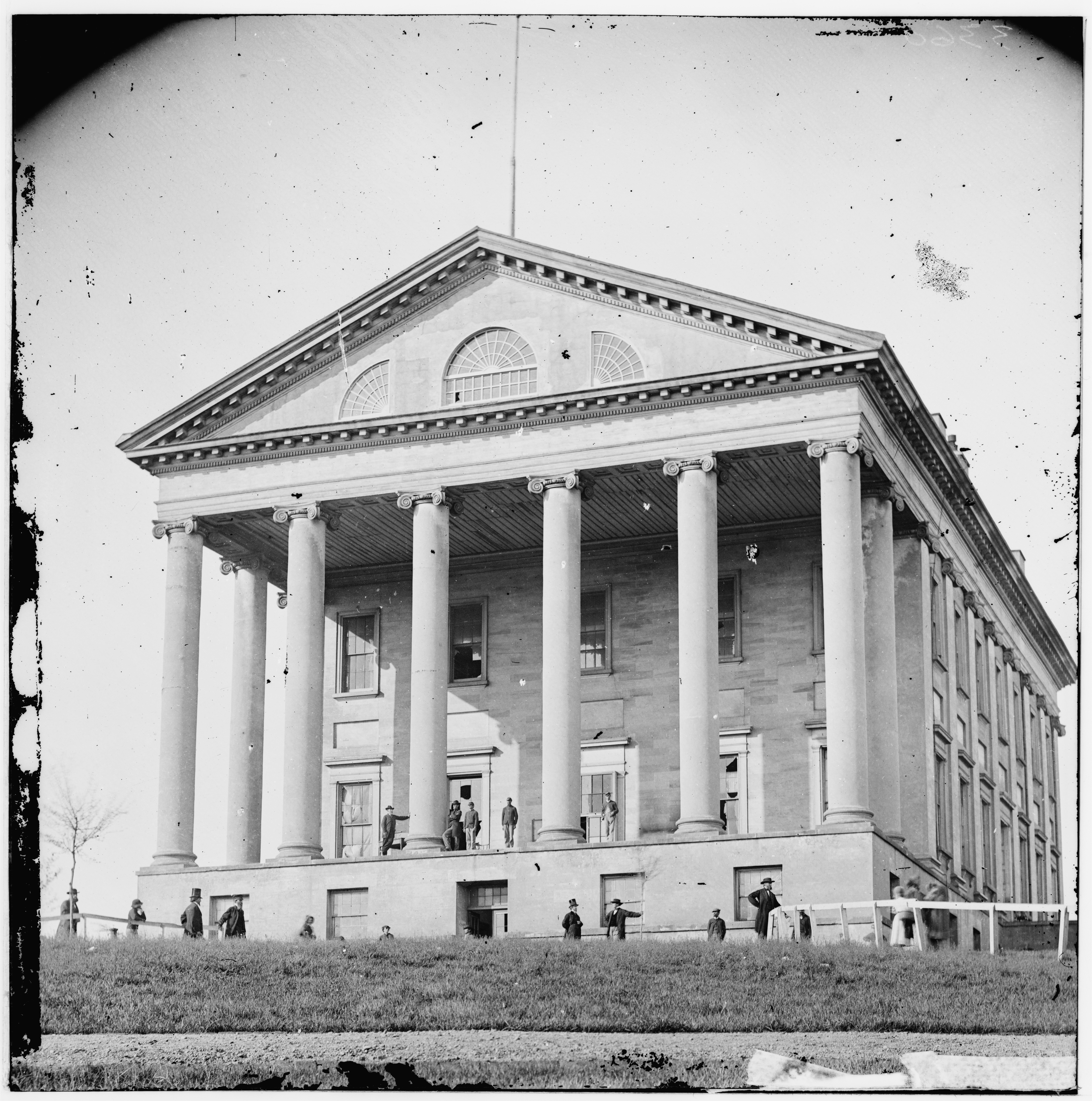
The new Virginia State Capitol, begun in 1785 and completed in 1792, designed by Thomas Jefferson following the relocation of the government to Richmond (as it appeared in the mid-19th century).

Victory in the Revolution brought peace and prosperity to the new state, as export markets in Europe reopened for its tobacco.

While the old local elites were content with the status quo, younger veterans of the war had developed a national identity. Led by George Washington and James Madison, Virginia played a major role in the Constitutional Convention of 1787 in Philadelphia. Madison proposed the Virginia Plan, which would give representation in Congress according to total population, including a proportion of people who were enslaved. Virginia was the most populous state, and it was allowed to count all of its white residents and 3/5 of the enslaved African Americans for its congressional representation and its electoral vote. (Only white men who owned a certain amount of property could vote.) Ratification was bitterly contested; the pro-Constitution forces prevailed only after promising to add a Bill of Rights. The Virginia Ratifying Convention approved the Constitution by a vote of 89–79 on June 25, 1788, making it the tenth state to enter the Union.

Madison played a central role in the new Congress, while Washington was the unanimous choice as first president. He was followed by the Virginia Dynasty, including Thomas Jefferson, Madison, and James Monroe, giving the state four of the first five presidents.

=== Slavery and freedmen in Antebellum Virginia ===
In 1772, a Virginia House of Burgesses committee, including Thomas Jefferson and Benjamin Harrison V, had submitted a petition to King George of England, requesting that he abolish the slave trade. The King rejected it. The Revolution that followed meant change and sometimes political freedom for enslaved African Americans, too. Tens of thousands of enslaved people from southern states, particularly in Georgia and South Carolina, escaped to British lines and freedom during the war. Thousands left with the British for resettlement in their colonies of Nova Scotia and Jamaica; others went to England; others disappeared into rural and frontier areas or the North.

Inspired by the Revolution and evangelical preachers, numerous enslavers in the Chesapeake region manumitted some or all of the people they had enslaved, during their lifetimes or by will. From 1,800 persons in 1782, the total population of free blacks in Virginia increased to 12,766 (4.3 percent of blacks) in 1790, and to 30,570 in 1810; the percentage change was from free blacks' comprising less than one percent of the total black population in Virginia, to 7.2 percent by 1810, even as the overall population increased. One planter, Robert Carter III freed more than 450 people in his lifetime, more than any other planter. George Washington freed all the people he had enslaved at his death.

Many free blacks migrated from rural areas to towns such as Petersburg, Richmond, and Charlottesville for jobs and community; others migrated with their families to the frontier where social strictures were more relaxed. Among the oldest black Baptist congregations in the nation were two founded near Petersburg before the Revolution. Each congregation moved into the city and built churches by the early 19th century.

Twice slave rebellions broke out in Virginia: Gabriel's Rebellion in 1800, and Nat Turner's Rebellion in 1831. White reaction was swift and harsh, and militias killed many innocent free blacks and black slaves as well as those directly involved in the rebellions. After the second rebellion, the legislature passed laws restricting the rights of free people of color: they were excluded from bearing arms, serving in the militia, gaining education, and assembling in groups. As bearing arms and serving in the militia were considered obligations of free citizens, free blacks came under severe constraints after Nat Turner's rebellion.

=== Westward emigration ===
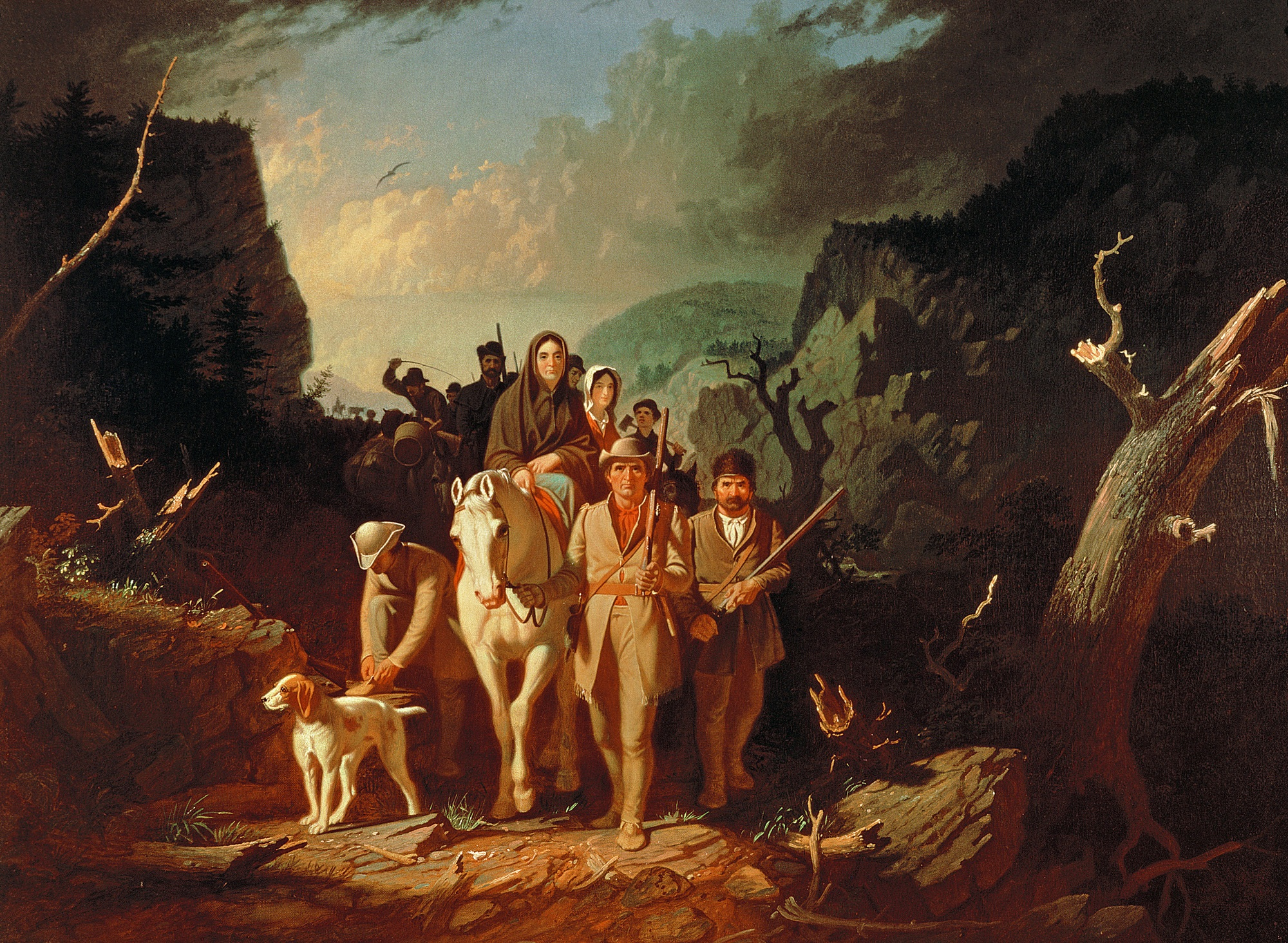
In the late 18th century, the Wilderness Road through the Cumberland Gap in far southwestern Virginia served as a key route across the Appalachians to Kentucky, and for points west until the National Road opened in the early 19th century.

As the new nation of the United States of America experienced growing pains and began to speak of Manifest Destiny, Virginia, too, found its role in the young republic to be changing and challenging. For one, the vast lands of the Virginia Colony were subdivided into other US states and territories. In 1784, Virginia relinquished its claims to the Illinois County, Virginia, except for the Virginia Military District (Southern Indiana). In 1775, Daniel Boone blazed a trail for the Transylvania Company from Fort Chiswell in Virginia through the Cumberland Gap into central Kentucky. This Wilderness Road became the principal route used by settlers for more than fifty years to reach Kentucky from the East. The fledgling US government rewarded veterans of the Revolutionary War with plots of land along the Ohio River in the Northwest Territory. In 1792, three western counties split off to form Kentucky.

A second influence: the lands seemed to be more fertile in the west. Virginia's heavy farming of tobacco for 200 years had depleted its soils.

The 1803 Louisiana Purchase only accelerated the westward movement of Virginians out of their native state. Many of the Virginians whose grandparents had created the Virginia Establishment began to emigrate and settle westward. Famous Virginian-born Americans affected not only the destiny of the state of Virginia, but the rapidly developing American Old West. Virginians Meriwether Lewis and William Clark were influential in their famous 1804–1806 expedition to explore the Missouri River and possible connections to the Pacific Ocean. Notable names such as Stephen F. Austin, Edwin Waller, Haden Harrison Edwards, and Dr. John Shackelford were famous Texan pioneers from Virginia. Even eventual Civil War general Robert E. Lee distinguished himself as a military leader in Texas during the 1846–48 Mexican–American War.

=== Cultural preservation ===
Historians estimate that one million Virginians left the commonwealth between the Revolution and the Civil War. With this exodus, Virginia experienced a decline in both population and political influence Prominent Virginians formed the Virginia Historical and Philosophical Society to preserve the legacy and memory of its past. At the same time, with Virginians settling so much of the west, they brought their cultural habits with them. Today, many cultural features of the American South can be attributed to Virginians who migrated west.

=== Cultural divide between Tidewater planters and Western Virginia farmers ===
As the western reaches of Virginia were developed in the first half of the 19th century, the vast differences in the agricultural basis, cultural, and transportation needs of the area became a major issue for the Virginia General Assembly. In the older, eastern portion, slavery contributed to the economy. While planters were moving away from labor-intensive tobacco to mixed crops, they still held numerous slaves and their leasing out or sales was also part of their economic prospect. Slavery had become an economic institution upon which planters depended. Watersheds on most of this area eventually drained to the Atlantic Ocean. In the western reaches, families farmed smaller homesteads, mostly without enslaved or hired labor. Settlers were expanding the exploitation of resources: mining of minerals and harvesting of timber. The land drained into the Ohio River Valley, and trade followed the rivers.

Representation in the state legislature was heavily skewed in favor of the more populous eastern areas and the historic planter elite. This was compounded by the partial allowance for slaves when counting population; as neither the slaves nor women had the vote, this gave more power to white men. The legislature's efforts to mediate the disparities ended without meaningful resolution, although the state held a constitutional convention on representation issues. Thus, at the outset of the American Civil War, Virginia was caught not only in national crisis, but in a long-standing controversy within its own boundaries. While other border states had similar regional differences, Virginia had a long history of east–west tensions which finally came to a head; it was the only state to divide into two separate states during the War.

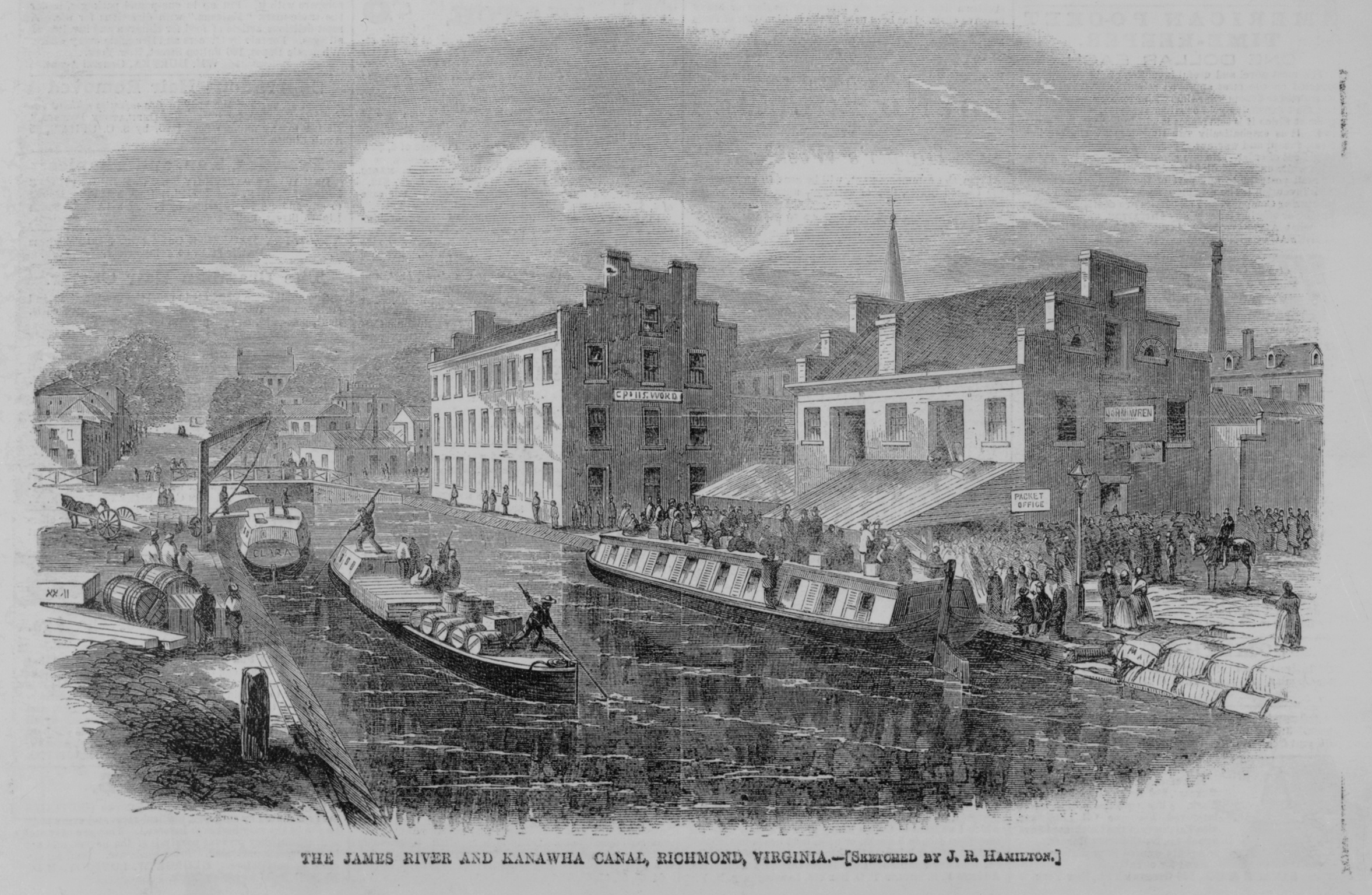
Begun in the late 18th century, the James River and Kanawha Canal was intended to form a transportation link between the James River in the east, and the Kanawha River (flowing into the Ohio River) across the Appalachians.

=== Infrastructure and Industrial Revolution ===
After the Revolution, various infrastructure projects began to be developed, including the Dismal Swamp Canal, the James River and Kanawha Canal, and various turnpikes. Virginia was home to the first of all Federal infrastructure projects under the new Constitution, the Cape Henry Light of 1792, located at the mouth of the Chesapeake Bay. Following the War of 1812, several Federal national defense projects were undertaken in Virginia. Drydock Number One was constructed in Portsmouth in the 1827. Across the James River, Fort Monroe was built to defend Hampton Roads, completed in 1834.

In the 1830s, railroads began to be built in Virginia. In 1831, the Chesterfield Railroad began hauling coal from the mines in Midlothian to docks at Manchester (near Richmond), powered by gravity and draft animals. The first railroad in Virginia to be powered by locomotives was the Richmond, Fredericksburg and Potomac Railroad, chartered in 1834, with the intent to connect with steamboat lines at Aquia Landing running to Washington, D.C. Soon after, others (with equally descriptive names) followed: the Richmond and Petersburg Railroad and Louisa Railroad in 1836, the Richmond and Danville Railroad in 1847, the Orange and Alexandria Railroad in 1848, and the Richmond and York River Railroad. In 1849, the Virginia Board of Public Works established the Blue Ridge Railroad. Under Engineer Claudius Crozet, the railroad successfully crossed the Blue Ridge Mountains via the Blue Ridge Tunnel at Afton Mountain.

Petersburg became a manufacturing center, as well as a city where free black artisans and craftsmen could make a living. In 1860, half its population was black and of that, one-third were free blacks, the largest such population in the state.

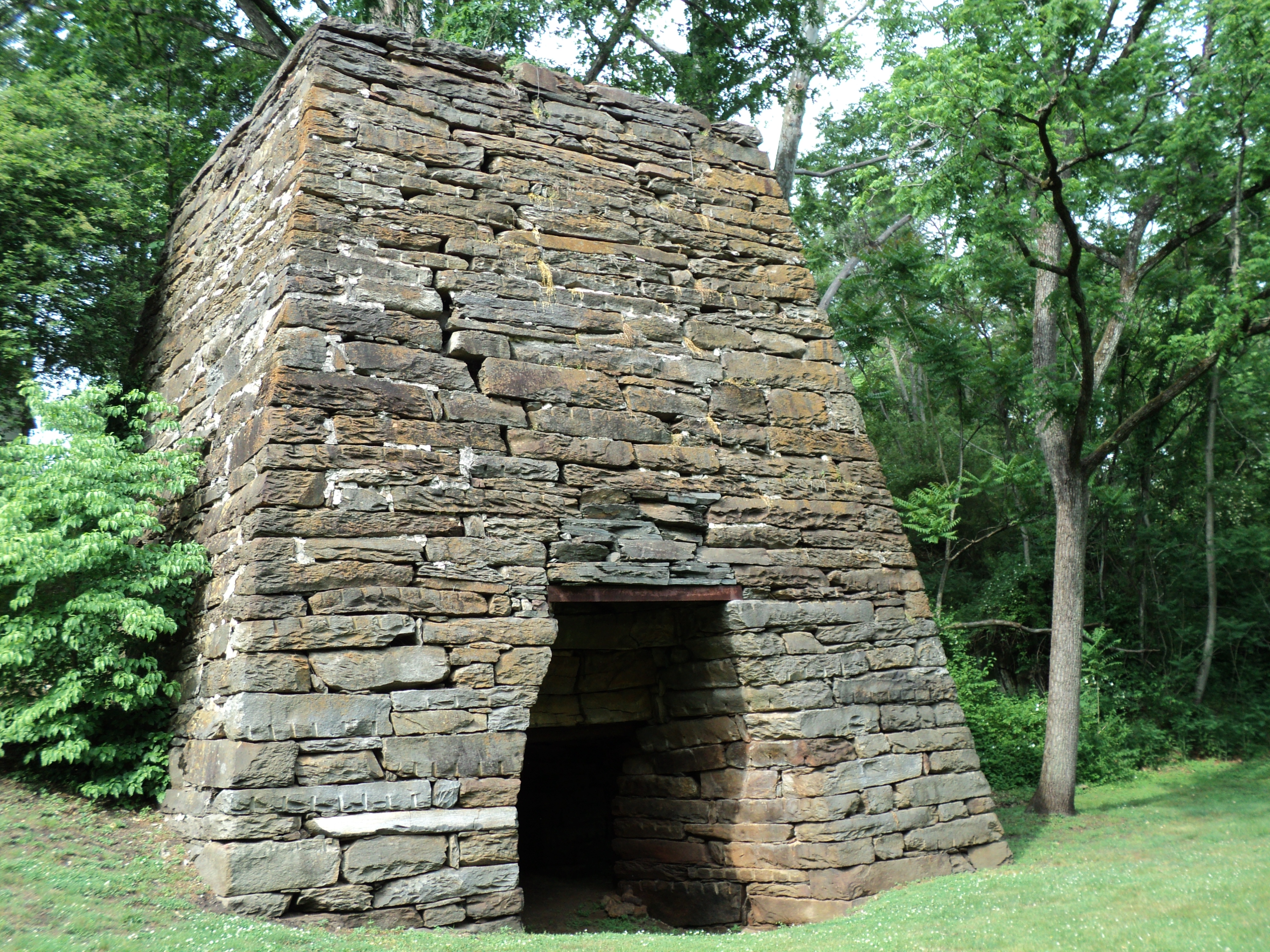
Remains of the Washington Iron Furnace in Franklin County, which operated from about 1770 to 1850.

==== Iron industry ====
With extensive iron deposits, especially in the western counties, Virginia was a pioneer in the iron industry. The first ironworks in the new world was established at Falling Creek in 1619, though it was destroyed in 1622. There would eventually grow to be 80 ironworks, charcoal furnaces and forges with 7,000 workers at any one time, about 70 percent of them slaves. Ironmasters hired slaves from local slave owners because they were cheaper than white workers, easier to control, and could not switch to a better employer. However, this meant the work ethic was weak; the wages went to the owner, not to the workers, who were forced to work hard, were poorly fed and clothed, and were separated from their families. Virginia's industry increasingly fell behind Pennsylvania, New Jersey, and Ohio, which relied on free labor. Bradford (1959) recounts the many complaints about slave laborers and argues the over-reliance on slaves contributed to the failure of the iron-masters to adopt improved methods of production for fear the slaves would sabotage them. Most of the blacks were unskilled manual laborers, although Lewis (1977) reports that some were in skilled positions.

== Civil War ==
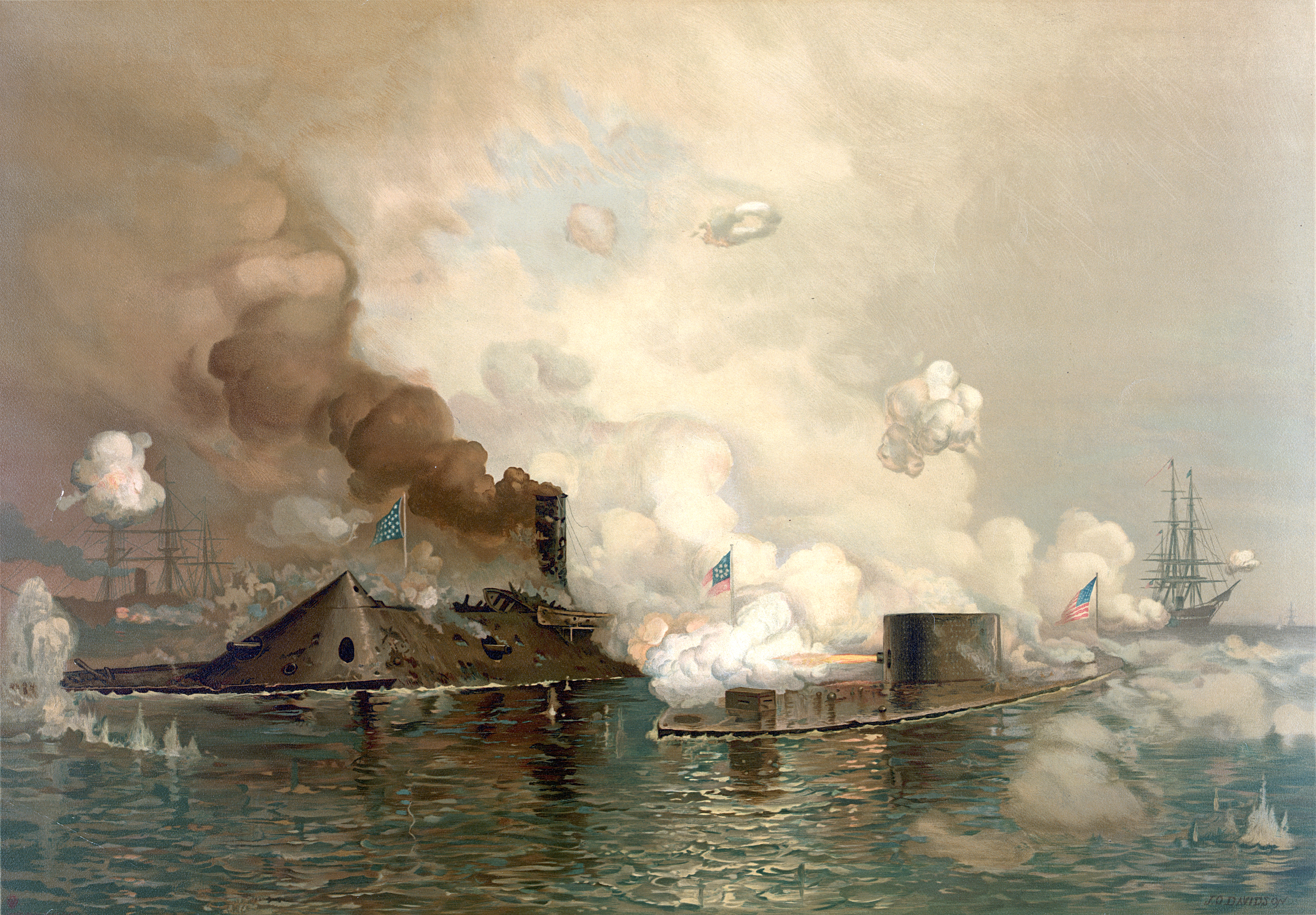
The Battle of Hampton Roads was fought in the James River near Hampton in 1862.

Virginia at first refused to join the Confederacy but did so after President Lincoln on April 15 called for troops from all states; that meant Federal troops crossing Virginia on the way south to subdue South Carolina. On April 17, 1861, the convention voted to secede, and voters ratified the decision on May 23. Immediately the Union army moved into northern Virginia and captured Alexandria without a fight and controlled it for the remainder of the war. The Wheeling area had opposed secession and remained strong for the Union.

Because of its strategic significance, the Confederacy relocated its capital to Richmond. Richmond was at the end of a long supply line and as the highly symbolic capital of the Confederacy became the main target of round after round of invasion attempts. A major center of iron production during the civil war was located in Richmond at Tredegar Iron Works, which produced most of the artillery for the war. The city was the site of numerous army hospitals. Libby Prison for captured Union officers gained an infamous reputation for the overcrowded and harsh conditions, with a high death rate. Richmond's main defenses were trenches built surrounding it down towards the nearby city of Petersburg. Saltville was a primary source of Confederate salt (critical for food preservation) during the war, leading to the two Battles of Saltville.

The first major battle of the Civil War occurred on July 21, 1861. Union forces attempted to take control of the railroad junction at Manassas, but the Confederate Army reached it first and won the First Battle of Manassas (known as "Bull Run" in Northern naming convention). Both sides mobilized for war; the year 1861 went on without another major fight.

Men from all economic and social levels, both enslavers and not, as well as former Unionists, enlisted in great numbers on both sides. Areas, especially in the west and along the border, that sent few men to the Confederacy were characterized by few enslaved people, poor economies, and a history of reinal antagonism to the Tidewater.

=== West Virginia breaks away ===
The western counties could not tolerate the Confederacy. Breaking away, they first formed the Union state of Virginia (recognized by Washington); it is called the Restored government of Virginia and was based in Alexandria, across the river from Washington. The Restored government did little except give its permission for Congress to form the new state of West Virginia in 1862. From May to August 1861, a series of Unionist conventions met in Wheeling; the Second Wheeling Convention constituted itself as a legislative body called the Restored Government of Virginia. It declared Virginia was still in the Union but that the state offices were vacant and elected a new governor, Francis H. Pierpont; this body gained formal recognition by the Lincoln administration on July 4. On August 20 the Wheeling body passed an ordinance for the creation; it was put to public vote on Oct. 24. The vote was in favor of a new state—West Virginia—which was distinct from the Pierpont government, which persisted until the end of the war. Congress and Lincoln approved, and, after providing for gradual emancipation of people in the new state constitution, West Virginia became the 35th state on June 20, 1863. In effect there were now three states: the Confederate Virginia, the Union Restored Virginia, and West Virginia.

The state and national governments in Richmond did not recognize the new state, and Confederates did not vote there. The Confederate government in Richmond sent in Robert E. Lee. But Lee found little local support and was defeated by Union forces from Ohio. Union victories in 1861 drove the Confederate forces out of the Monongahela and Kanawha valleys, and throughout the remainder of the war the Union held the region west of the Alleghenies and controlled the Baltimore and Ohio Railroad in the north. The new state was not subject to Reconstruction.

=== Later war years ===
For the remainder of the war, many major battles were fought across Virginia, including the Seven Days Battles, the Battle of Fredericksburg, the Battle of Chancellorsville, the Battle of Brandy Station

Over the course of the War, despite occasional tactical victories and spectacular counter-stroke raids, Confederate control of many regions of Virginia was gradually lost to Federal advance. By October 1862 the northern 9th and 10th Congressional districts along the Potomac were under Union control. Eastern Shore, Northern, Middle and Lower Peninsula and the 2nd congressional district surrounding Norfolk west to Suffolk were permanently Union-occupied by May. Other regions, such as the Piedmont and Shenandoah Valley, regularly changed hands through numerous campaigns.

In 1864, the Union Army planned to attack Richmond by a direct overland approach through Overland Campaign and the Battle of the Wilderness, culminating in the Siege of Petersburg which lasted from the summer of 1864 to April 1865. By November 6, 1864, Confederate forces controlled only four of Virginia's 16 congressional districts in the region of Richmond-Petersburg and their Southside counties.

In April 1865, Richmond was burned by a retreating Confederate Army; Lincoln walked the city streets to cheering crowds of newly freed blacks. The Confederate government fled south, pausing in Danville for a few days. The end came when Lee surrendered to Ulysses Grant at Appomattox on April 9, 1865.

== Reconstruction ==
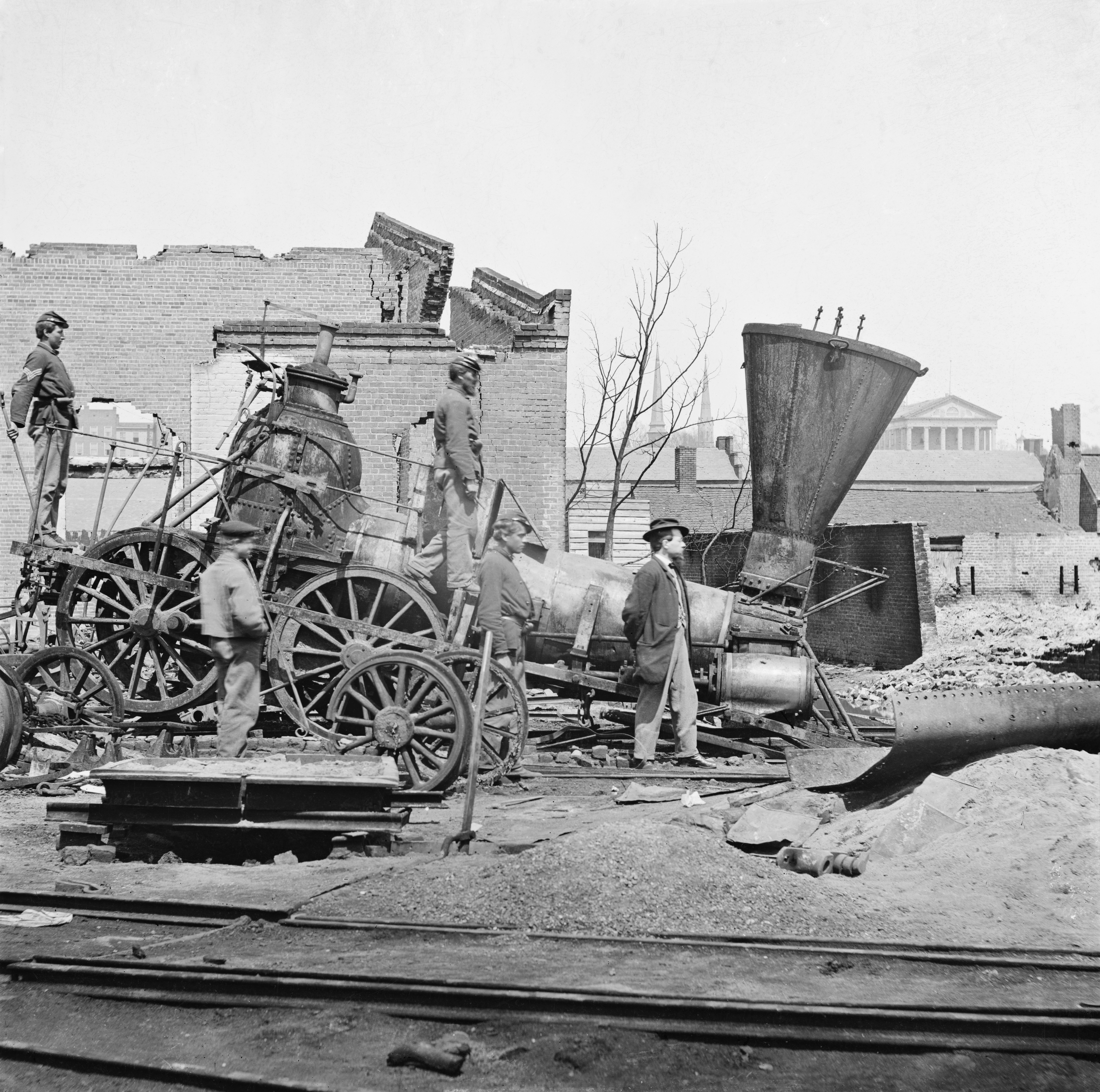
Remains of a locomotive of the Richmond and Petersburg Railroad, at the destroyed depot in Richmond.

Virginia had been devastated by the war, with the infrastructure (such as railroads) in ruins; many plantations burned out; and large numbers of refugees without jobs, food or supplies beyond rations provided by the Union Army, especially its Freedmen's Bureau.

Historian Mary Farmer-Kaiser reports that white landowners complained to the Bureau about unwillingness of freedwomen to work in the fields as evidence of their laziness, and asked the Bureau to force them to sign labor contracts. In response, many Bureau officials "readily condemned the withdrawal of freedwomen from the work force as well as the 'hen pecked' husbands who allowed it." While the Bureau did not force freedwomen to work, it did force freedmen to work or be arrested as vagrants. Furthermore, agents urged poor unmarried mothers to give their older children up as apprentices to work for white masters. Farmer-Kaiser concludes that "Freedwomen found both an ally and an enemy in the bureau."

There were three phases in Virginia's Reconstruction era: wartime, presidential, and congressional. Immediately after the war President Andrew Johnson recognized the Francis Harrison Pierpont government as legitimate and restored local government. The Virginia legislature passed Black Codes that severely restricted Freedmen's mobility and rights; they had only limited rights and were not considered citizens, nor could they vote. The state ratified the 13th amendment to abolish slavery and revoked the 1861 ordnance of secession. Johnson was satisfied that Reconstruction was complete.

Other Republicans in Congress refused to seat the newly elected state delegation; the Radicals wanted better evidence that enslavement and similar methods of serfdom had been abolished, and the freedmen given rights of citizens. They also were concerned that Virginia leaders had not renounced Confederate nationalism. After winning large majorities in the 1866 national election, the Radical Republicans gained power in Congress. They put Virginia (and nine other ex-Confederate states) under military rule. Virginia was administered as the "First Military District" in 1867–69 under General John Schofield Meanwhile, the Freedmen became politically active by joining the pro-Republican Union League, holding conventions, and demanding universal male suffrage and equal treatment under the law, as well as demanding disfranchisement of ex-Confederates and the seizure of their plantations. McDonough, finding that Schofield was criticized by conservative whites for supporting the Radical cause on the one hand, and attacked on the other by Radicals for thinking black suffrage was premature on the other, concludes that "he performed admirably' by following a middle course between extremes.

Increasingly a deep split opened up in the republican ranks. The moderate element had national support and called itself "True Republicans." The more radical element set out to disfranchise whites—such as not allowing a man to hold office if he was a private in the Confederate army, or had sold food to the Confederate government, plus land reform. About 20,000 former Confederates were denied the right to vote in the 1867 election. In 1867, radical James Hunnicutt (1814–1880), a white preacher, editor and Scalawag (white Southerners supporting Reconstruction) mobilized the black Republican vote by calling for the confiscation of all plantations and turning the land over to Freedmen and poor whites. The "True Republicans" (the moderates), led by former Whigs, businessmen and planters, while supportive of black suffrage, drew the line at property confiscation. A compromise was reached calling for confiscation if the planters tried to intimidate black voters. Hunnicutt's coalition took control of the Republican Party, and began to demand the permanent disfranchisement of all whites who had supported the Confederacy. The Virginia Republican party became permanently split, and many moderate Republicans switched to the opposition "Conservatives". The Radicals won the 1867 election for delegates to a constitutional convention.

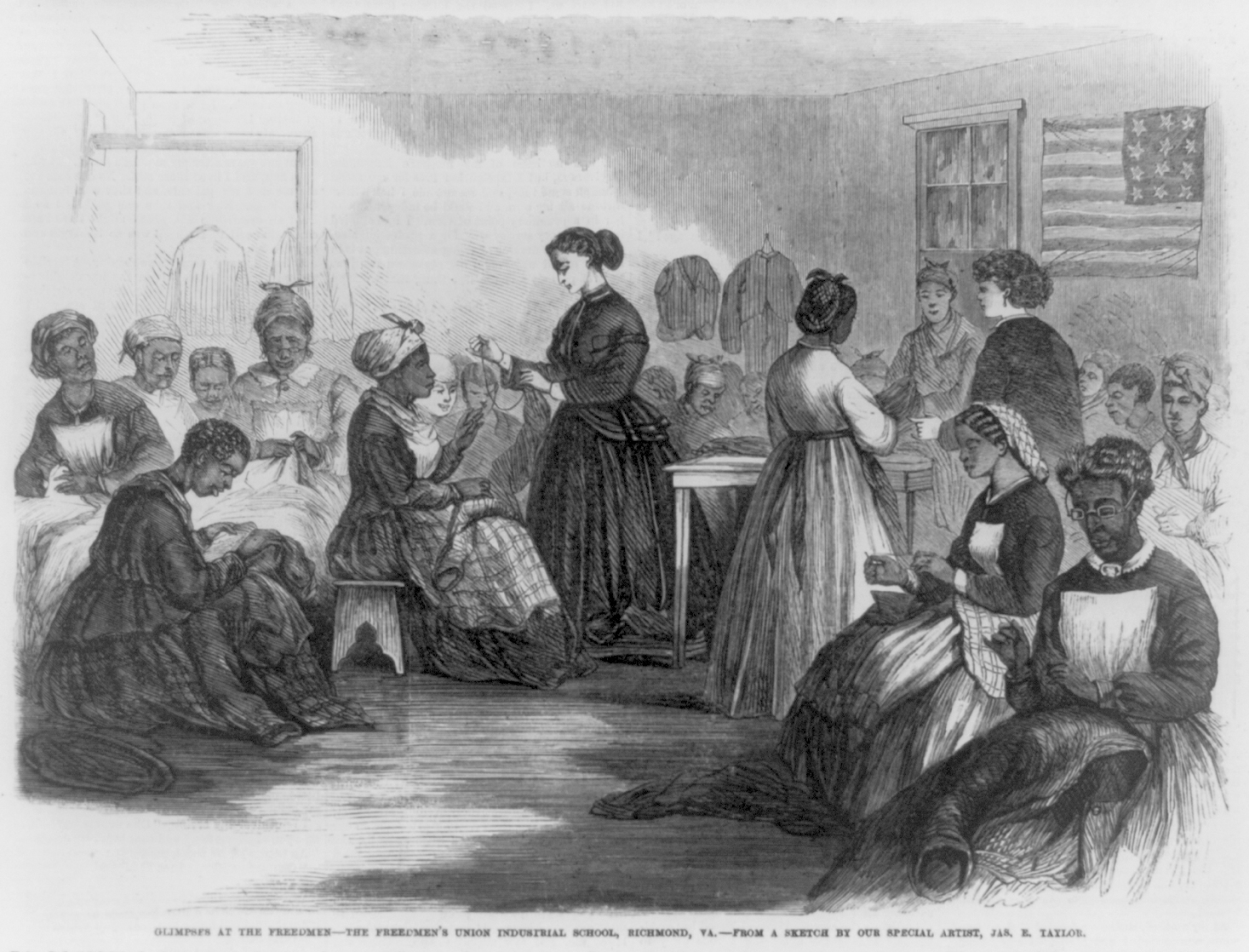
An industrial school set up for formerly enslaved people in Richmond during Reconstruction era

The 1868 constitutional convention included 33 white Conservatives, and 72 Radicals (of whom 24 were Blacks, 23 Scalawag, and 21 Carpetbaggers. Called the "Underwood Constitution" after the presiding officer, the main accomplishment was to reform the tax system, and create a system of free public schools for the first time in Virginia. After heated debates over disfranchising Confederates, the Virginia legislature approved a Constitution that excluded ex-Confederates from holding office, but allowed them to vote in state and federal elections.

Under pressure from national Republicans to be more moderate, General Schofield continued to administer the state through the Army. He appointed a personal friend, Henry H. Wells as provisional governor. Wells was a Carpetbagger and a former Union general. Schofield and Wells fought and defeated Hunnicutt and the Scalawag Republicans. They took away contracts for state printing orders from Hunnicutt's newspaper. The national government ordered elections in 1869 that included a vote on the new Underwood constitution, a separate one on its two disfranchisement clauses that would have permanently stripped the vote from most former rebels, and a separate vote for state officials. The Army enrolled the Freedmen (ex-enslaved) as voters but would not allow some 20,000 prominent whites to vote or hold office. The Republicans nominated Wells for governor, as Hunnicutt and most Scalawags went over to the opposition.

The leader of the moderate Republicans, calling themselves "True Republicans," was William Mahone (1826–1895), a railroad president and former Confederate general. He formed a coalition of white Scalawag Republicans, some blacks, and ex-Democrats who formed the Conservative Party. Mahone recommended that whites had to accept the results of the war, including civil rights and the vote for Freedmen. Mahone convinced the Conservative Party to drop its own candidate and endorse Gilbert C. Walker, Mahone's candidate for governor. In return, Mahone's people endorsed Conservatives for the legislative races. Mahone's plan worked, as the voters in 1869 elected Walker and defeated the proposed disfranchisement of ex-Confederates.

When the new legislature ratified the 14th and 15th amendments to the U.S. Constitution, Congress seated its delegation, and Virginia Reconstruction came to an end in January 1870. The Radical Republicans had been ousted in a non-violent election. Virginia was the only southern state that did not elect a civilian government that represented more Radical Republican principles. Suffering from widespread destruction and difficulties in adapting to free labor, white Virginians generally came to share the postwar bitterness typical of the southern attitudes. Historian Richard Lowe argues that the obstacles faced by the Radical Republican movement made their cause hopeless:

...even more damaging to Republicans' prospects than their poverty, their inexperience in state politics, their isolation from potential allies, and their identification with the heated North was the perverse and powerful racism that ran so powerfully through the white community. The great majority of the Old Dominion's white citizens could not take seriously a political party composed primarily of former slaves.

== Gilded Age ==
=== Readjustment, public education, segregation ===
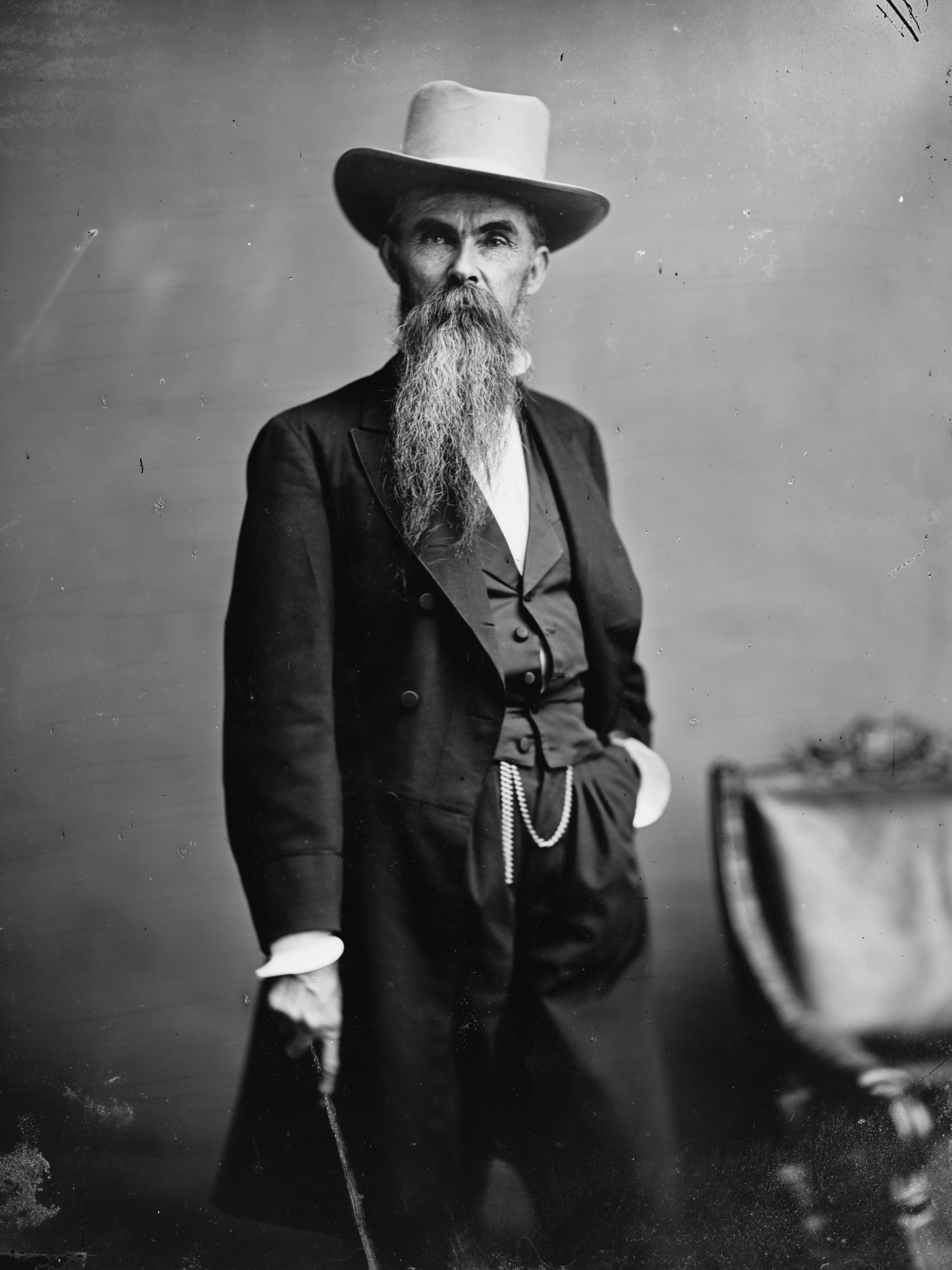
Former Confederate General William Mahone led the Readjuster Party during the 1870s.

A division among Virginia politicians occurred in the 1870s, when those who supported a reduction of Virginia's pre-war debt ("Readjusters") opposed those who felt Virginia should repay its entire debt plus interest ("Funders"). Virginia's pre-war debt was primarily for infrastructure improvements overseen by the Virginia Board of Public Works, much of which were destroyed during the war or in the new State of West Virginia.

After his unsuccessful bid for the Democratic nomination for governor in 1877, former confederate General and railroad executive William Mahone became the leader of the "Readjusters", forming a coalition of conservative Democrats and white and black Republicans. The so-called Readjusters aspired "to break the power of wealth and established privilege" and to promote public education. The party promised to "readjust" the state debt in order to protect funding for newly established public education, and allocate a fair share to the new State of West Virginia. Its proposal to repeal the poll tax and increase funding for schools and other public facilities attracted biracial and cross-party support.

The Readjuster Party was successful in electing its candidate, William E. Cameron as governor, and he served from 1882 to 1886. Mahone served as a Senator in the U.S. Congress from 1881 to 1887, as well as fellow Readjustor Harrison H. Riddleberger, who served in the U.S. Senate from 1883 to 1889. Readjusters' effective control of Virginia politics lasted until 1883, when they lost majority control in the state legislature, followed by the election of Democrat Fitzhugh Lee as governor in 1885. The Virginia legislature replaced both Mahone and Riddleberger in the U.S. Senate with Democrats.

In 1888, the exception to Readjustor and Democratic control was John Mercer Langston, who was elected to Congress from the Petersburg area on the Republican ticket. He was the first black elected to Congress from the state, and the last for nearly a century. He served one term. A talented and vigorous politician, he was an Oberlin College graduate. He had long been active in the abolitionist cause in Ohio before the Civil War, had been president of the National Equal Rights League from 1864 to 1868, and had headed and created the law department at Howard University, and acted as president of the college. When elected, he was president of what became Virginia State University.

While the Readjustor Party faded, the goal of public education remained strong, with institutions established for the education of schoolteachers. In 1884, the state acquired a bankrupt women's college at Farmville and opened it as a normal school. Growth of public education led to the need for additional teachers. In 1908, two additional normal schools were established, one at Fredericksburg and one at Harrisonburg, and in 1910, one at Radford.

After the Readjuster Party disappeared, Virginia Democrats rapidly passed legislation and constitutional amendments that effectively disfranchised African Americans and many poor whites, through the use of poll taxes and literacy tests. They created white, one-party rule under the Democratic Party for the next 80 years. White state legislators passed statutes that restored white supremacy through imposition of Jim Crow segregation. In 1902, Virginia passed a new constitution that reduced voter registration.

=== Railroad and industrial growth ===
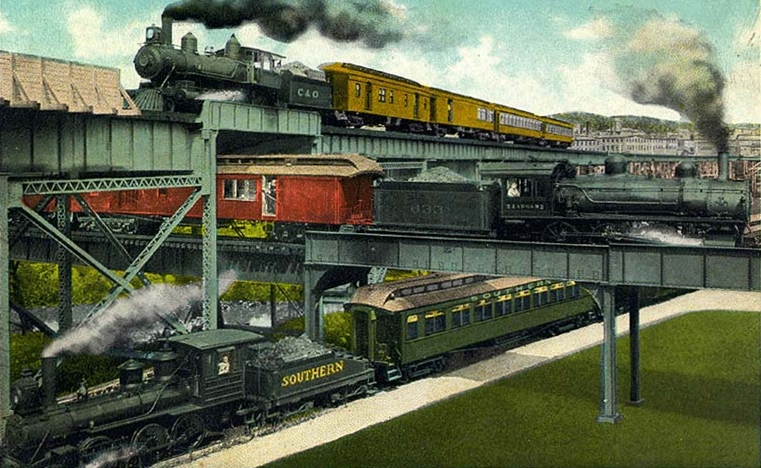
The Triple Crossing in Richmond, finished in 1901, was the intersection of (from top to bottom) the Chesapeake and Ohio Railway, the Seaboard Air Line, and the Southern Railway

In addition to those that were rebuilt, new railroads developed after the Civil War. In 1868, under railroad baron Collis P. Huntington, the Virginia Central Railroad was merged and transformed into the Chesapeake and Ohio Railroad. In 1870, several railroads were merged to form the Atlantic, Mississippi and Ohio Railroad, later renamed Norfolk & Western. In 1880, the towpath of the now-defunct James River & Kanawha canal was transformed into the Richmond and Allegheny Railroad, which within a decade would merge into the Chesapeake and Ohio Railway. Others would include the Southern Railroad, the Seaboard Air Line, and the Atlantic Coast Line; still others would eventually reach into Virginia, including the Baltimore & Ohio and the Pennsylvania Railroad. The rebuilt Richmond, Fredericksburg, and Potomac Railroad eventually was linked to Washington, D.C.

In the 1880s, the Pocahontas Coalfield opened up in far southwest Virginia, with others to follow, in turn providing more demand for railroads transportation. In 1909, the Virginian Railway opened, built for the express purpose of hauling coal from the mountains of West Virginia to the ports at Hampton Roads. The growth of railroads resulted in the creation of new towns and rapid growth of others, including Clifton Forge, Roanoke, Crewe and Victoria. The railroad boom was not without incident: the Wreck of the Old 97 occurred just north of Danville, Virginia, in 1903, later immortalized by a popular ballad.

With the invention of the cigarette rolling machine, and the great increase in smoking in the early 20th century, cigarettes and other tobacco products became a major industry in Richmond and Petersburg. Tobacco magnates such as Lewis Ginter funded a number of public institutions.

== Progressive Era ==
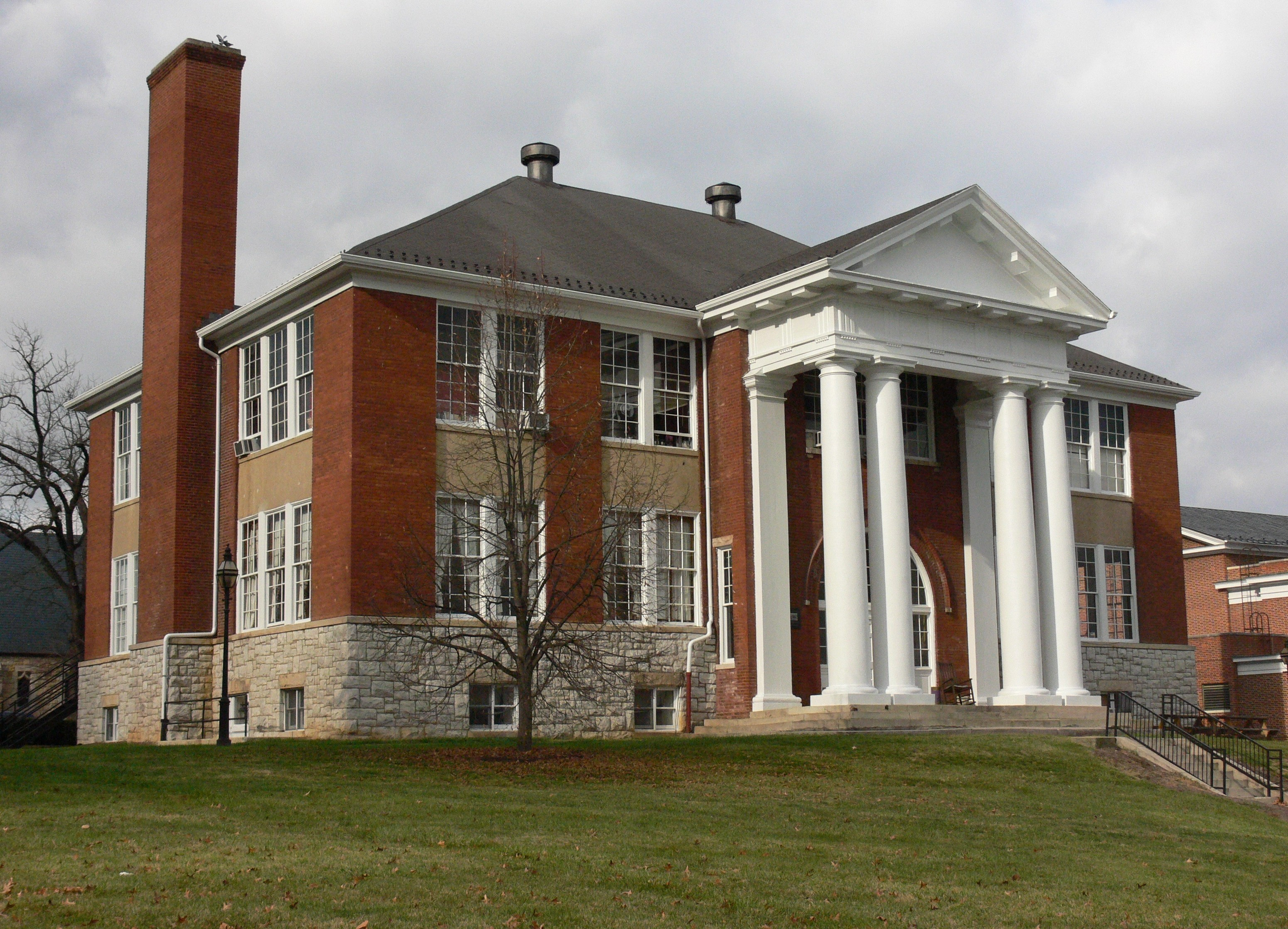
Lexington High School by architect Charles M. Robinson, built in 1908, was typical of the modern public schools that cities built during the Progressive Era.

The Progressive Era after 1900 brought numerous reforms, designed to modernize the state, increase efficiency, apply scientific methods, promote education and eliminate waste and corruption.

A key leader was Governor Claude Swanson (1906–10), a Democrat who left machine politics behind to win office using the new primary law. Swanson's coalition of reformers in the legislature, built schools and highways, raised teacher salaries and standards, promoted the state's public health programs, and increased funding for prisons. Swanson fought against child labor, lowered railroad rates and raised corporate taxes, while systematizing state services and introducing modern management techniques. The state funded a growing network of roads, with much of the work done by black convicts in chain gangs. After Swanson moved to the U.S. Senate in 1910 he promoted Progressivism at the national level as a supporter of President Woodrow Wilson, who had been born in Virginia and was considered a native son. Swanson, as a power on naval affairs, promoted the Norfolk Navy Yard and Newport News Ship Building and Drydock Corporation. Swanson's statewide organization evolved into the "Byrd Organization."

The State Corporation Commission (SCC) was formed as part of the 1902 Constitution, over the opposition of the railroads, to regulate railroad policies and rates. The SCC was independent of parties, courts, and big businesses, and was designed to maximize the public interest. It became an effective agency, which especially pleased local merchants by keeping rates low.

Virginia has a long history of agricultural reformers, and the Progressive Era stimulated their efforts. Rural areas suffered persistent problems, such as declining populations, widespread illiteracy, poor farming techniques, and debilitating diseases among both farm animals and farm families. Reformers emphasized the need to upgrade the quality of elementary education. With federal help, in they set up a county agent system (today the Virginia Cooperative Extension) that taught farmers the latest scientific methods for dealing with tobacco and other crops, and farm house wives how to maximize their efficiency in the kitchen and nursery.

Some upper-class women, typified by Lila Meade Valentine of Richmond, promoted numerous Progressive reforms, including kindergartens, teacher education, visiting nurses programs, and vocational education for both races. Middle-class white women were especially active in the Prohibition movement. The woman suffrage movement became entangled in racial issues—whites were reluctant to allow black women the vote—and was unable to broaden its base beyond middle-class whites. Virginia women got the vote in 1920, the result of a national constitutional amendment.

In higher education, the key leader was Edwin A. Alderman, president of the University of Virginia, 1904–31. His goal was the transformation of the southern university into a force for state service and intellectual leadership. and educational utility. Alderman successfully professionalized and modernized the state's system of higher education. He promoted international standards of scholarship, and a statewide network of extension services. Joined by other college presidents, he promoted the Virginia Education Commission, created in 1910. Alderman's crusade encountered some resistance from traditionalists, and never challenged the Jim Crow system of segregated schooling.

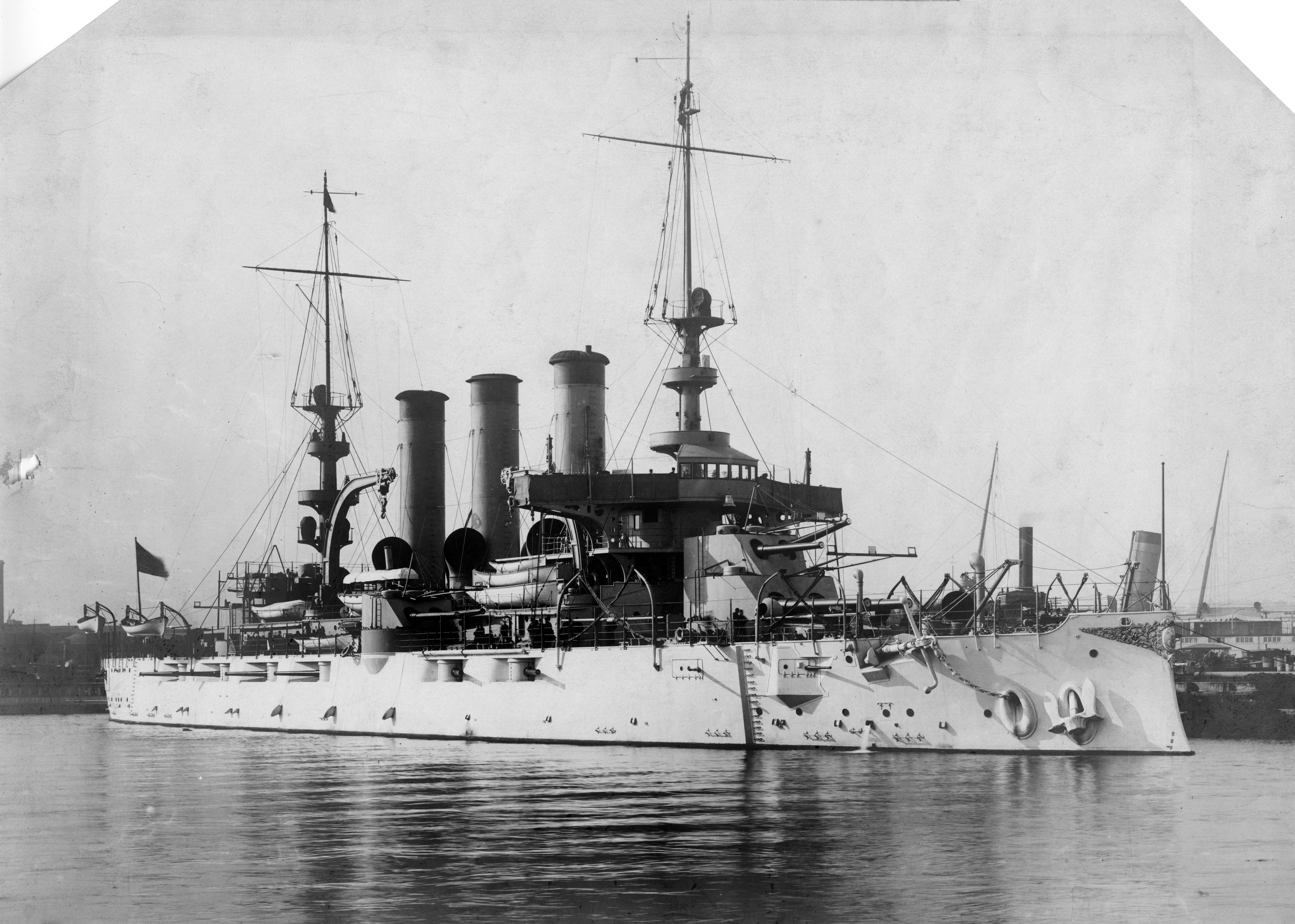
Many Pre-Dreadnought and World War I-era warships were built at the Newport News Shipbuilding and Drydock Company, including the USS Virginia; the shipyard remains a major producer of American Naval vessels.

While the progressives were modernizers, there was also a surge of interest in Virginia traditions and heritage, especially among the aristocratic First Families of Virginia (FFV). The Association for the Preservation of Virginia Antiquities(APVA), founded in Williamsburg in 1889, emphasized patriotism in the name of Virginia's 18th-century Founding Fathers. In 1907, the Jamestown Exposition was held near Norfolk to celebrate the tricentennial of the arrival of the first English colonists and the founding of Jamestown.

Attended by numerous federal dignitaries, and serving as the launch point for the Great White Fleet, the Jamestown Exposition also spurred interest in the military potential of the area. The site of the exposition would later become, in 1917, the location of the Norfolk Naval Station. The proximity to Washington, D.C., the moderate climate, and strategic location of a large harbor at the center of the Atlantic seaboard made Virginia a key location during World War I for new military installations. These included Fort Story, the Army Signal Corps station at Langley, Quantico Marine Base in Prince William County, Fort Belvoir in Fairfax County, Fort Lee near Petersburg and Fort Eustis, in Warwick County (now Newport News). At the same time, heavy shipping traffic made the area a target for U-boats, and a number of merchant vessels were attacked or sunk off the Virginia coast.

== Interwar ==
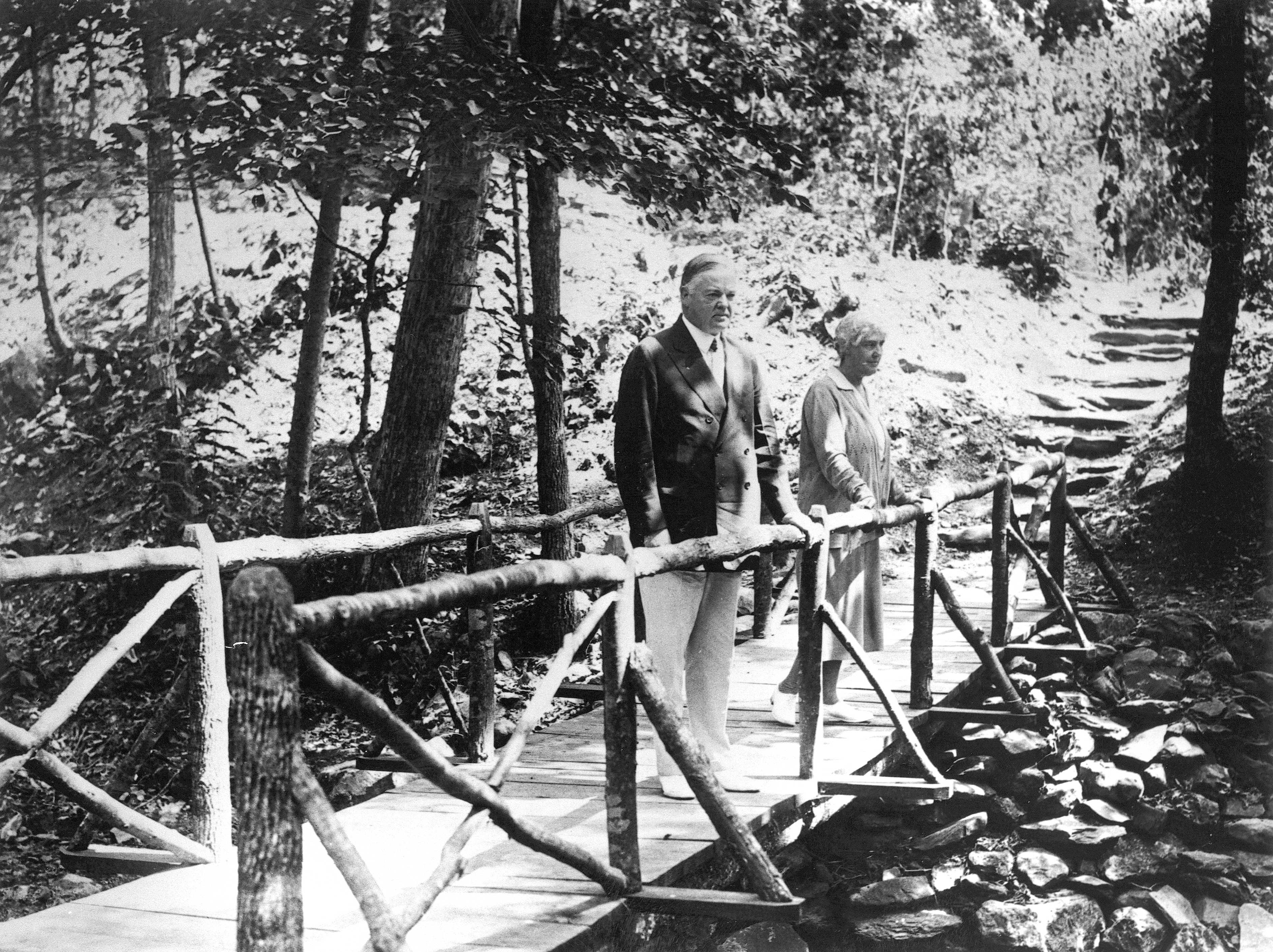
Rapidan Camp served as Herbert Hoover's Presidential retreat (the predecessor to Camp David), in what would become Shenandoah National Park.

Temperance became an issue in the early 20th century. In 1916, a statewide referendum passed to outlaw the consumption of alcohol. This was overturned in 1933.

In 1926, Dr. W.A.R. Goodwin, rector of Williamsburg's Bruton Parish Church, began restoration of colonial-era buildings in the historic district with financial backing of John D. Rockefeller Jr. Though their project, like others in the state, had to contend with the Great Depression and World War II, work continued as Colonial Williamsburg became a major tourist attraction.

Shenandoah National Park was constructed from newly gathered land, as well as the Blue Ridge Parkway and Skyline Drive. The Civilian Conservation Corps played a major role in developing that National Park, as well as Pocahontas State Park. By 1940, new highway bridges crossed the lower Potomac, Rappahannock, York, and James Rivers, bringing to an end the long-distance steamboat service which had long served as primary transportation throughout the Chesapeake Bay area. Ferryboats remain today in only a few places.

=== Byrd machine ===
Blacks comprised a third of the population but lost nearly all their political power. The electorate was so small that from 1905 to 1948 government employees and officeholders cast a third of the votes in state elections. This small, controllable electorate facilitated the formation of a powerful statewide political machine by Harry Byrd (1887–1966), which dominated from the 1920s to the 1960s. Most of the blacks who remained politically active supported the Byrd organization, which in turn protected their right to vote, making Virginia's race relations the most harmonious in the South before the 1950s, according to V.O. Key. Not until Federal civil rights legislation was passed in 1964 and 1965 did African Americans recover the power to vote and the protection of other basic constitutional civil rights.

== WWII through mid-20th century ==
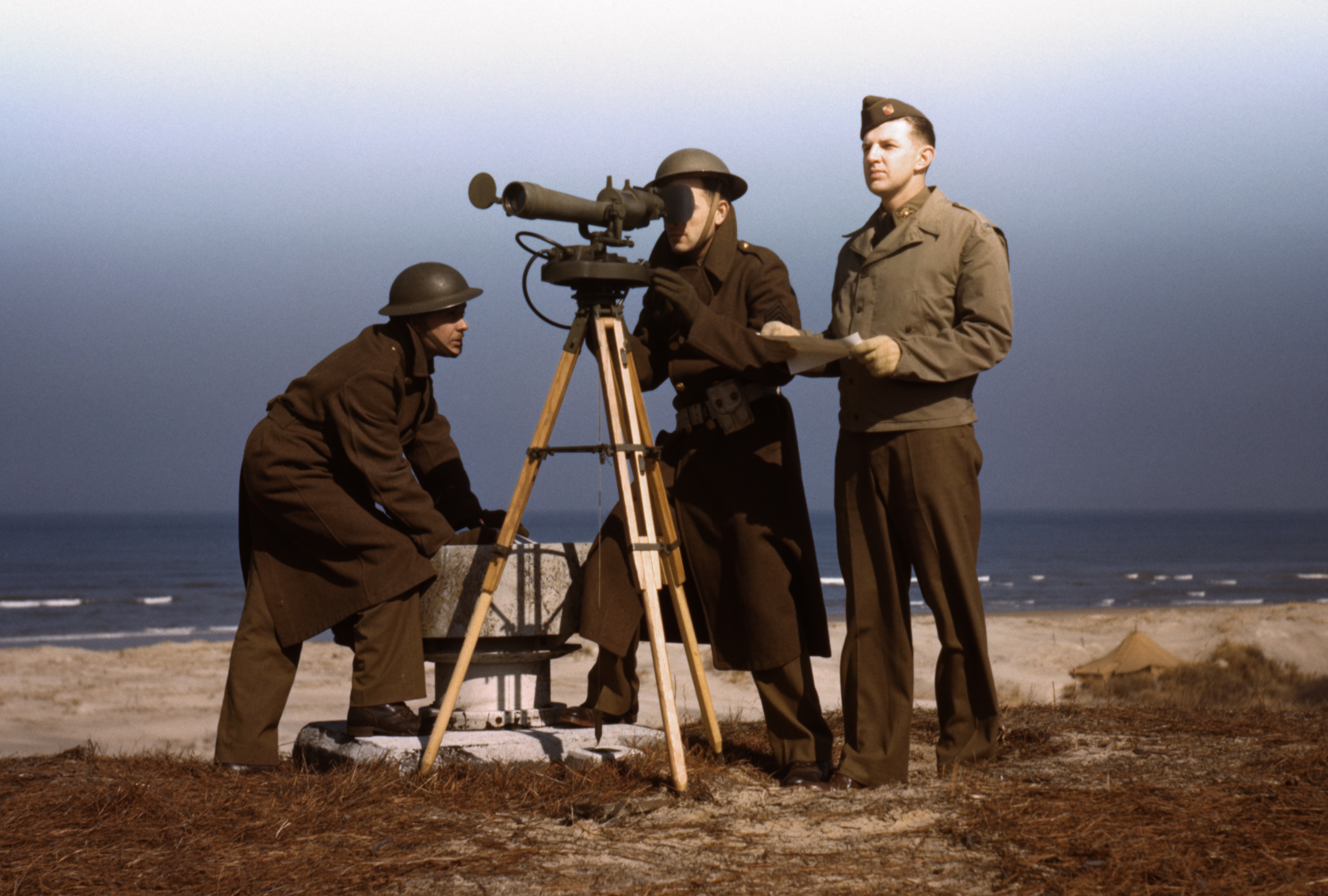
US Servicemen practicing at Fort Story in 1942.

The economic stimulus of the World War brought full employment for workers, high wages, and high profits for farmers. It brought in many thousands of soldiers and sailors for training. Virginia sent 300,000 men and 4,000 women to the services. The buildup for the war greatly increased the state's naval and industrial economic base, as did the growth of federal government jobs in Northern Virginia and adjacent Washington, DC. The Pentagon was built in Arlington as the largest office building in the world. Additional installations were added: in 1941, Fort A.P. Hill and Fort Pickett opened, and Fort Lee was reactivated. The Newport News shipyard expanded its labor force from 17,000 to 70,000 in 1943, while the Radford Arsenal had 22,000 workers making explosives. Turnover was very high—in one three-month period the Newport News shipyard hired 8400 new workers as 8,300 others quit.

=== Cold War and Space Age ===
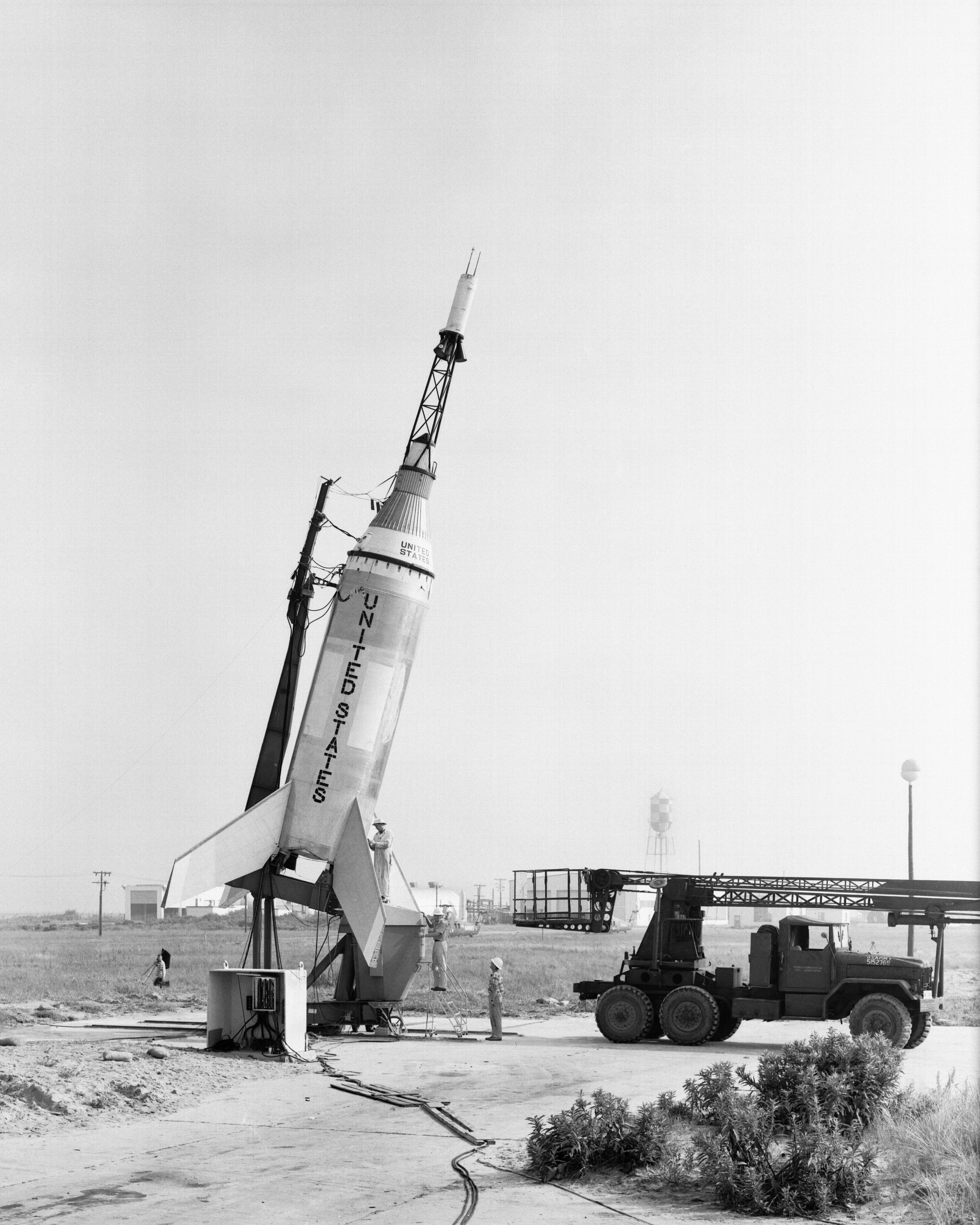
A Little Joe rocket being prepared for launch at the Wallops Flight Facility near Chincoteague, as part of Project Mercury

In addition to general postwar growth, the Cold War resulted in further growth in both Northern Virginia and Hampton Roads. With the Pentagon already established in Arlington, the newly formed Central Intelligence Agency located its headquarters further afield at Langley (unrelated to the Air Force Base). In the early 1960s, the new Dulles International Airport was built, straddling the Fairfax County-Loudoun County border. Other sites in Northern Virginia included the listening station at Vint Hill. Due to the presence of the U.S. Atlantic Fleet in Norfolk, in 1952 the Allied Command Atlantic of NATO was headquartered there, where it remained for the duration of the Cold War. Later in the 1950s and across the river, Newport News Shipbuilding would begin construction of the USS Enterprise—the world's first nuclear-powered aircraft carrier—and the subsequent atomic carrier fleet.

Virginia also witnessed American efforts in the Space Race. When the National Advisory Committee for Aeronautics was transformed into the National Aeronautics and Space Administration in 1958, the resulting Space Task Group headquartered at the laboratories of Langley Research Center. From there, it would initiate Project Mercury, and would remain the headquarters of the U.S. human spaceflight program until its transfer to Houston in 1962. On the Eastern Shore, near Chincoteague, Wallops Flight Facility served as a rocket launch site, including the launch of Little Joe 2 on December 4, 1959, which sent a rhesus monkey, Sam, into suborbital spaceflight. Langley later oversaw the Viking program to Mars.

The new U.S. Interstate highway system begun in the 1950s and the new Hampton Roads Bridge-Tunnel in 1958 helped transform Virginia Beach from a tiny resort town into one of the state's largest cities by 1963, and spurring the growth of the Hampton Roads region linked by the Hampton Roads Beltway. In the western portion of the state, completion of north–south Interstate 81 brought better access and new businesses to dozens of counties over a distance of 300 miles (480 km) as well as facilitating travel by students at the many Shenandoah area colleges and universities. The creation of Smith Mountain Lake, Lake Anna, Claytor Lake, Lake Gaston, and Buggs Island Lake, by damming rivers, attracted many retirees and vacationers to those rural areas. As the century drew to a close, Virginia tobacco growing gradually declined due to health concerns, although not at steeply as in Southern Maryland. A state community college system brought affordable higher education within commuting distance of most Virginians, including those in remote, underserved localities. Other new institutions were founded, most notably George Mason University and Liberty University. Localities such as Danville and Martinsville suffered greatly as their manufacturing industries closed.

=== Civil rights era and Massive Resistance ===
In 1944, Irene Morgan refused to give up her seat on an interstate bus and was arrested in Middlesex County, Virginia, pursuant to Virginia's segregation laws. Morgan appealed her case up to the U.S. Supreme Court and, in 1946, won Irene Morgan v. Commonwealth of Virginia, which struck down racial segregation in interstate buses. Virginia continued to enforce interstate bus segregation, and in 1947, activists organized a series of integrated rides, the Journey of Reconciliation, through Virginia and other states of the Upper South in an act of civil disobedience against Virginia's defiance of the Supreme Court's ruling. Another U.S. Supreme Court ruling involving Virginia, Boynton v. Virginia (1960), desegregated interstate bus terminals. Morgan, Boynton, and the Journey of Reconciliation inspired the 1961 Freedom Rides that fought bus segregation in the Deep South. Along with the bus desegregation cases, Virginia was a contestant in the U.S. Supreme Court ruling that invalidated laws prohibiting interracial marriage, Loving v. Virginia (1967).

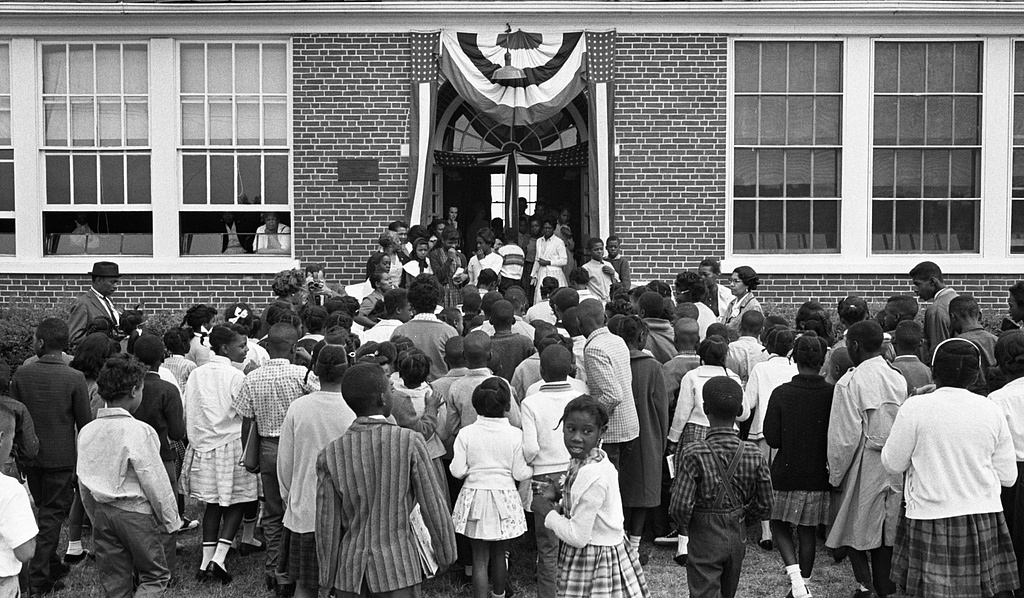
The U.S. Supreme Court order Prince Edward County to integrate its schools in 1964.

Senator Harry Byrd, the state's dominant politician, was long a champion of constitutional rights against expansion of federal power. He deployed two doctrines in a last ditch battle against racial integration after the Brown decision of 1954: interposition and massive resistance. The first doctrine proclaimed that the U.S. Constitution allowed the states to interpose state sovereignty blocking rulings of federal courts from taking effect on local school boards. The new doctrine of Massive Resistance became a rallying cry across the southern United States to block orders by federal courts to integrate public schools. The test cases came in Virginia, when in 1956 the legislature adopted interposition and urged fellow states to join in. Governor Stanley abandon his earlier moderation, and the legislature adopted the Stanley Plan. It included 13 segregationist laws, including five that were designed to intimidate the NAACP. The governor now had the power to close public schools, and he shut down the first one in Warren County in 1958, followed by Charlottesville and Norfolk. In 1959, both the Virginia supreme Court of Appeals, and the federal court declared the Stanley Plan unconstitutional in terms of both the state and federal constitutions. Governor J. Lindsay Almond broke with Byrd; the General assembly voted to end massive resistance. Nevertheless, from 1959 to 1963, Prince Edward County closed all its public schools.

The first black students attended the University of Virginia School of Law in 1950, and Virginia Tech in 1953. In 2008, various actions of the Civil Rights Movement were commemorated by the Virginia Civil Rights Memorial in Richmond.

== Late 20th century to present ==
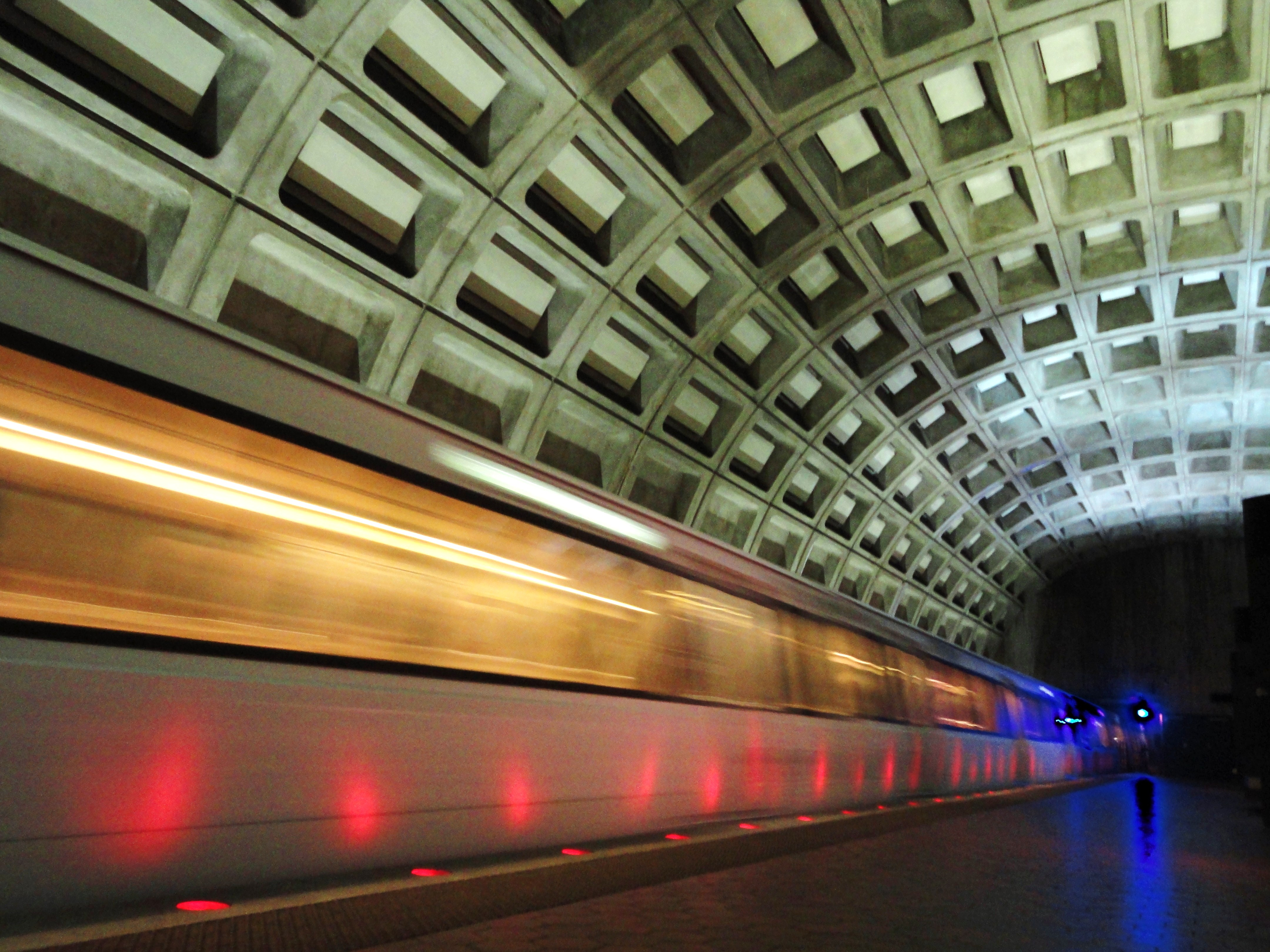
Opening in 1976, the Washington Metro began to link Washington D.C., with the growing population centers in Northern Virginia

By the 1980s, Northern Virginia and the Hampton Roads region had achieved the greatest growth and prosperity, chiefly because of employment related to Federal government agencies and defense, and an increase in technology in Northern Virginia. Shipping through the Port of Hampton Roads began expansion which continued into the early 21st century as new container facilities were opened. Coal piers in Newport News and Norfolk had recorded major gains in export shipments by August 2008. The recent expansion of government programs in the areas near Washington has profoundly affected the economy of Northern Virginia whose population has experienced large growth and great ethnic/ cultural diversification, exemplified by communities, such as Tysons, Reston and dense, urban Arlington. The subsequent growth of defense projects has also generated a local information technology industry. In recent years, intolerably heavy commuter traffic and the urgent need for both road and rail transportation improvements have been a major issue in Northern Virginia. The Hampton Roads region has also experienced much growth, as have the western suburbs of Richmond in both Henrico and Chesterfield Counties.

On January 13, 1990, Douglas Wilder became the first African American to be elected as Governor of a US state since Reconstruction when he was elected Governor of Virginia.

Virginia served as a major center for information technology during the early days of the Internet and network communication. Internet and other communications companies clustered in the Dulles Corridor. By 1993, the Washington area had the largest amount of Internet backbone and the highest concentration of Internet service providers. In 2000, more than half of all Internet traffic flowed along the Dulles Toll Road, and by 2016 70% of the world's internet traffic flowed through Loudoun County. Bill von Meister founded two Virginia companies that played major roles in the commercialization of the Internet: McLean, Virginia, based The Source and Control Video Corporation, forerunner of America Online. While short-lived, The Source was one of the first online service providers alongside CompuServe. On hand for the launch of The Source, Isaac Asimov remarked "This is the beginning of the information age." The Source helped pave the way for future online service providers including another Virginia company founded by von Meister, America Online (AOL). AOL became the largest provider of Internet access during the Dial-up era of Internet access. AOL maintained a Virginia headquarters until the then-struggling company moved in 2007.

In 2006, former Governor of Virginia Mark Warner gave a speech and interview in the massively multiplayer online game Second Life, becoming the first politician to appear in a video game. In 2007, Virginia speedily passed the nation's first spaceflight act by a vote of 99–0 in the House of Delegates. Northern Virginia company Space Adventures is currently the only company in the world offering space tourism. In 2008, Virginia became the first state to pass legislation on Internet safety, with mandatory educational courses for 11-to-16 year-olds.

In 2013, by a slight margin in the Virginia Governor's race, the state of Virginia broke a long acclaimed streak of choosing a governor against the incumbent party within the White House. For the first time in more than thirty years, the Governor and the President were from the same party.

== Virginia history on stamps ==
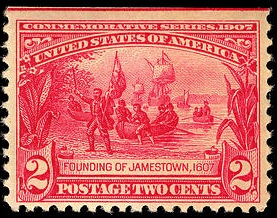
Coming ashore at Jamestown
1907 issue Jamestown centennial

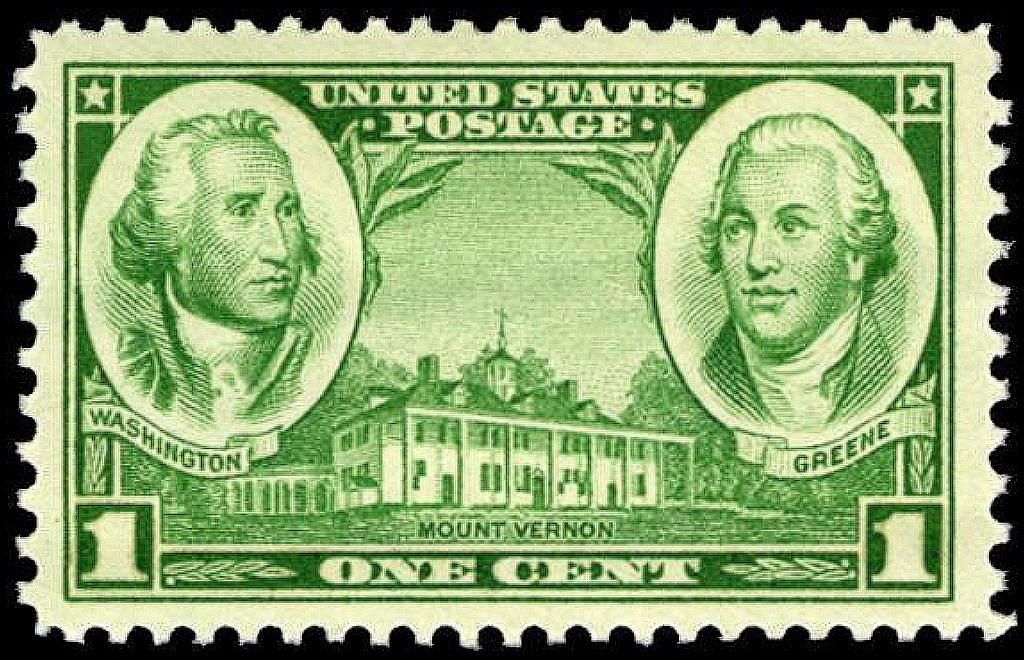
Mount Vernon, home of G. Washington
1936 issue Army-Navy series

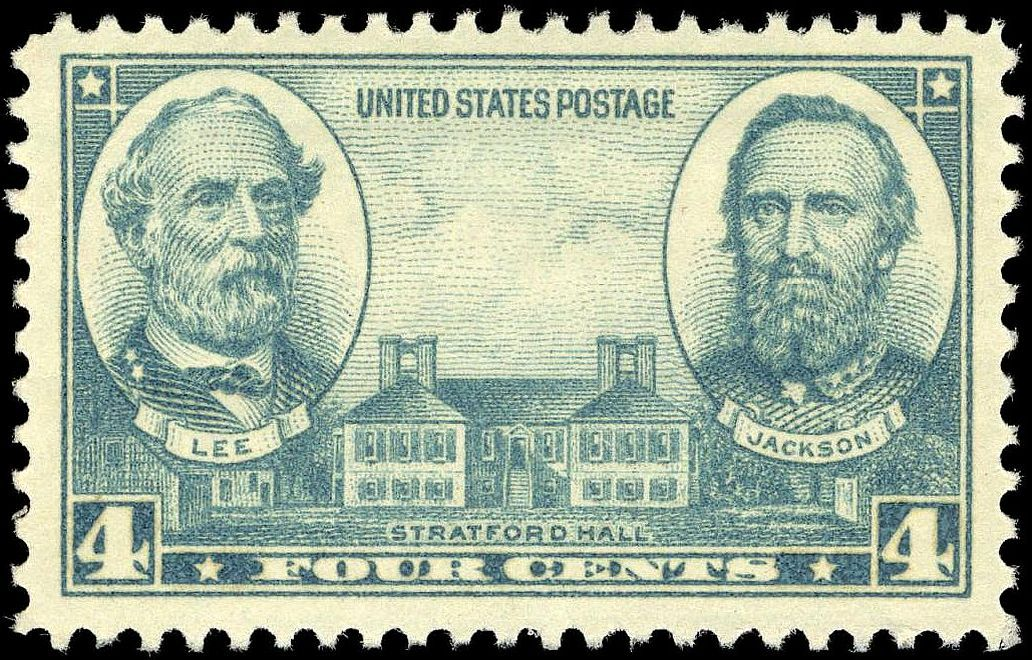
Stratford Hall, birthplace of Robert E. Lee
1937 issue Army-Navy series

Stamps of Virginia events and landmarks include the Jamestown founding, Mount Vernon, and Stratford Hall.

== See also ==
- Colonial South and the Chesapeake
- Colony of Virginia
- Constitution of Virginia
- Women's suffrage in Virginia
- List of former counties, cities, and towns of Virginia
- List of historical societies in Virginia
- History of the Southern United States
- History of Virginia on stamps
- List of newspapers in Virginia#Defunct newspapers
- Virginia Conventions
- Native American tribes in Virginia
- First Africans in Virginia
- History of slavery in Virginia
- Tobacco in the American colonies
