= A History of the Trans-Appalachian Frontier =

History and territorial evolution of the Trans-Appalachian frontier

- Edited by: Malcolm J. Rohrbough and Walter Nugent
- Country: United States
- Language: English
- Discipline: Non-fiction, history
- Publisher: Indiana University Press
- No. of books: 10

A History of the Trans-Appalachian Frontier is a series of books by different authors about the history and territorial evolution of the Trans-Appalachian frontier; common themes across the series are frontier violence, the establishment of towns, land speculation, homesteading, agricultural practices. slavery on the frontier, and the evolving and often exploitative relationships between white settlers, black slaves, and Native Americans.

Books in the series include:

- The Trans-Appalachian Frontier: People, Societies, and Institutions, 1775-1850 by Malcolm J. Rohrbough (1978).
- Frontier Indiana by Andrew R. L. Cayton (1996).
- Frontier Illinois by James Edward Davis (2000).
- Tennessee Frontiers: Three Regions in Transition by John R. Finger (2001).
- Florida's Frontiers by Paul E. Hoffman (2002).
- American Confluence: The Missouri Frontier from Borderland to Border State by Stephen Aron (2006).
- Kentucke's Frontiers by Craig Thompson Friend (2010).
- The Wisconsin Frontier by Mark Wyman (2010).
- The Ohio Frontier: Crucible of the Old Northwest, 1720–1830 by R. Douglas Hurt (2010).
- Alabama’s Frontiers and the Rise of the Old South by Daniel S. Dupre (2019).

The series is published by Indiana University Press. The series is edited by Malcolm J. Rohrbough and Walter Nugent.

Rohrbough is a historian specializing in the American frontier and westward expansion, and the author of numerous works including The Trans-Appalachian Frontier: People, Societies, and Institutions, 1775–1850. He is Professor Emeritus of History at the University of Iowa, where he taught from the 1960s until his retirement in 2008.

Walter Nugent was an American historian and professor at Indiana University Bloomington and the University of Notre Dame. His work specialized in migration, populism, and the history of the American West; he was the author of numerous works including Into the West: The Story of Its People and Habits of Empire: A History of American Expansion.

== See also ==
- Trans-Appalachia
- Ohio Country
- Northwest Territory
- Old Southwest
