= Frontier Illinois =

History and territorial evolution of the Illinois frontier

- Author: James E. Davis
- Language: English
- Series: A History of the Trans-Appalachian Frontier
- Subject: History of Illinois
- Genre: Non-fiction, history
- Publisher: Indiana University Press
- Publication date: 1998
- Publication place: United States
- Media type: Print (hardcover and paperback)
- Pages: 515 pp.
- Website: Indiana University Press

Frontier Illinois is a 1998 non-fiction book by the American historian James E. Davis, published by the Indiana University Press. The work is a history of Illinois from before the frontier era to the eve of the Civil War. It is part of the Indiana University series A History of the Trans-Appalachian Frontier.

== Synopsis ==
Davis contends that the Illinois frontier was relatively peaceful and was shaped largely by compromise and consensus.

The book begins with the geography of Illinois and its Native American inhabitants, and then covers the French colonial period, including La Salle, Fort de Chartres, and French settlement and trading activity in the upper Mississippi, followed by the periods of British and American dominance.

Most of the book deals with the years after 1800, after the Louisiana Purchase and the granting of statehood in 1818. Davis examines migration, Native displacement, land speculation, and town establishment and boosterism in the 1820s and 1830s. He discusses slavery in the state, including the defeat of an 1824 constitutional referendum that would have permitted it and the 1837 killing of the abolitionist editor Elijah Lovejoy. He traces how land became scarce, the impact of speculation, railroads and urbanization and how Chicago became the largest city in Illinois and a major regional transportation and commercial hub.

The book closes with the role of Illinois in the Mexican–American War and the start of the Civil War.

== Academic journal reviews ==
- Burnette, R. (1999). Review of the book Frontier Illinois, by J. E. Davis. Journal of the Illinois State Historical Society, 92(2), 189–191.
- Cayton, A. R. L. (1999). Review of the book Frontier Illinois, by J. E. Davis. The Journal of American History, 86(3), 1335–1336.
- Gruenwald, K. M. (1999). Review of the book Frontier Illinois, by J. E. Davis. Michigan Historical Review, 25(1), 145–146.
- Kindig, E. W. (1999). Review of the book Frontier Illinois, by J. E. Davis. Journal of the Early Republic, 19(2), 344–346.
- Koos, G. (2001). Review of the book Frontier Illinois: A History of the Trans-Appalachian Frontier , by J. E. Davis. Michigan Historical Review, 27(1), 179–180.

== Release information ==
- Hardcover: 1998 (First edition), Indiana University Press, 515 pp. ISBN 978-0-253-33423-7
- Paperback: 2000, Indiana University Press, 544 pp. ISBN 978-0-253-21406-5
- Kindle: Indiana University Press

== About the author ==
James E. Davis was the William and Charlotte Gardner Professor of History and Professor of Geography at Illinois College in Jacksonville, Illinois. He was also the author of Frontier America, 1800–1840: A Comparative Demographic Analysis of the Settlement Process.

== Similar or related works ==
- American Confluence: The Missouri Frontier from Borderland to Border State by Stephen Aron (2006).
- Kentucke's Frontiers by Craig Thompson Friend (2010).
- Tennessee Frontiers: Three Regions in Transition by John R. Finger (2001).
- The Trans-Appalachian Frontier: People, Societies, and Institutions, 1775–1850 by Malcolm J. Rohrbough (1978; third edition, Indiana University Press, 2008).
