= American Confluence: The Missouri Frontier from Borderland to Border State =

2006 book by Stephen Aron

- Book cover
- Author: Stephen Aron
- Audio read by: Randy Whitlow
- Language: English
- Subject: Trans-Appalachian Frontier
- Genre: Non-fiction, History
- Publisher: Indiana University Press
- Publication date: 2006
- Publication place: United States
- Media type: Hardcover, Paperback, eBook, Audiobook
- Pages: 301
- Website: Indiana University Press

American Confluence: The Missouri Frontier from Borderland to Border State is a book by Stephen Aron, published in 2006 by Indiana University Press. The work is part of the A History of the Trans-Appalachian Frontier series.

== Synopsis ==
Stephen Aron's American Confluence examines the Missouri frontier from the mid-18th century to the Civil War, focusing on the region where the Ohio and Missouri rivers flow into the Mississippi River. Aron describes this area as a borderland shaped by Native peoples, and successive waves of French, Spanish, British, and eventually American settlement. The history shows how trade, negotiation, brute force, and alliances competed for power and control. As American control expanded, Native peoples and European empires lost influence and control and demonstrates how the issue of slavery deepened regional conflicts and set the stage for an opening theater of the Civil War.

== Reception and reviews ==
- Cassity, M. (2006). Review of American Confluence: The Missouri Frontier from Borderland to Border State, by S. Aron. The Journal of American History, 93(3), 857–858.
- Foley, W. E. (2007). Review of American Confluence: The Missouri Frontier from Borderland to Border State, by S. Aron. The Journal of Southern History, 73(3), 692–693.
- Gitlin, J. (2007). Review of American Confluence: The Missouri Frontier from Borderland to Border State, by S. Aron. Western Historical Quarterly, 38(4), 510–511.
- Hurt, R. D. (2007). Review of American Confluence: The Missouri Frontier from Borderland to Border State, by S. Aron. The Arkansas Historical Quarterly, 66(1), 73–74.
- Nobles, G. (2007). Review of American Confluence: The Missouri Frontier from Borderland to Border State, by S. Aron. Pacific Historical Review, 76(3), 471–473.
- Ostendorf, A. (2010). Review of American Confluence: The Missouri Frontier from Borderland to Border State; River of Dreams: Imagining the Mississippi before Mark Twain, by S. Aron & Thomas Ruys Smith. Journal of the Early Republic, 30(2), 338–341.
- Schoenbachler, M. (2006). Review of American Confluence: The Missouri Frontier from Borderland to Border State, by S. Aron. The Register of the Kentucky Historical Society, 104(2), 309–311.
- Sundberg, S.B. (2007). Review of the book American Confluence: The Missouri Frontier from Borderland to Border State, by Stephen Aron. Ohio Valley History, 7(3), 80–81.

== Release information ==
- Hardcover: 2006 (First Edition), Indiana University Press, 301 pp.
- Paperback: 2009, Indiana University Press, 301 pp.
- eBook: 2006, Indiana University Press.
- Audiobook: 2016, University Press Audiobooks, 9 hours and 3 minutes.

== Similar or related works ==
- Kentucke's Frontiers by Craig Thompson Friend (2010).
- Tennessee Frontiers: Three Regions in Transition by John R. Finger (2001).
- The Trans-Appalachian Frontier: People, Societies, and Institutions, 1775–1850 by Malcolm J. Rohrbough (1978; third edition, Indiana University Press, 2008).

== About the author ==
Stephen Aron is an American historian specializing in the history of the American West, frontiers, and borderlands. He has served as the Calvin and Marilyn Gross Director and President and CEO of the Autry Museum of the American West in Los Angeles since July 2021. Aron taught at Princeton University before joining the University of California, Los Angeles (UCLA) in 1996, where he held the Robert N. Burr Chair in the Department of History and was the founding executive director of the Institute for the Study of the American West at the Autry Museum. He retired from UCLA in 2021 and is Professor Emeritus of history there. Aron also served as editor of the Autry's magazine Convergence from about 2004 to 2011.

== See also ==
- History of Missouri
- History of slavery in Missouri
- Missouri Constitutional Convention of 1861–1863
