= Rutherford House (disambiguation) =

The Rutherford House is a historic building and museum in Edmonton, Alberta, Canada.

Rutherford House may also refer to:

== Buildings ==
=== United States ===
- Dr. Hiram Rutherford House and Office, Oakland, Illinois
- Otto and Verdell Rutherford House, Portland, Oregon
- Fair-Rutherford and Rutherford Houses, Columbia, South Carolina

=== New Zealand ===
- Rutherford House, part of Victoria University of Wellington's Pipitea campus
