= Oakland, Illinois =

Oakland
- City
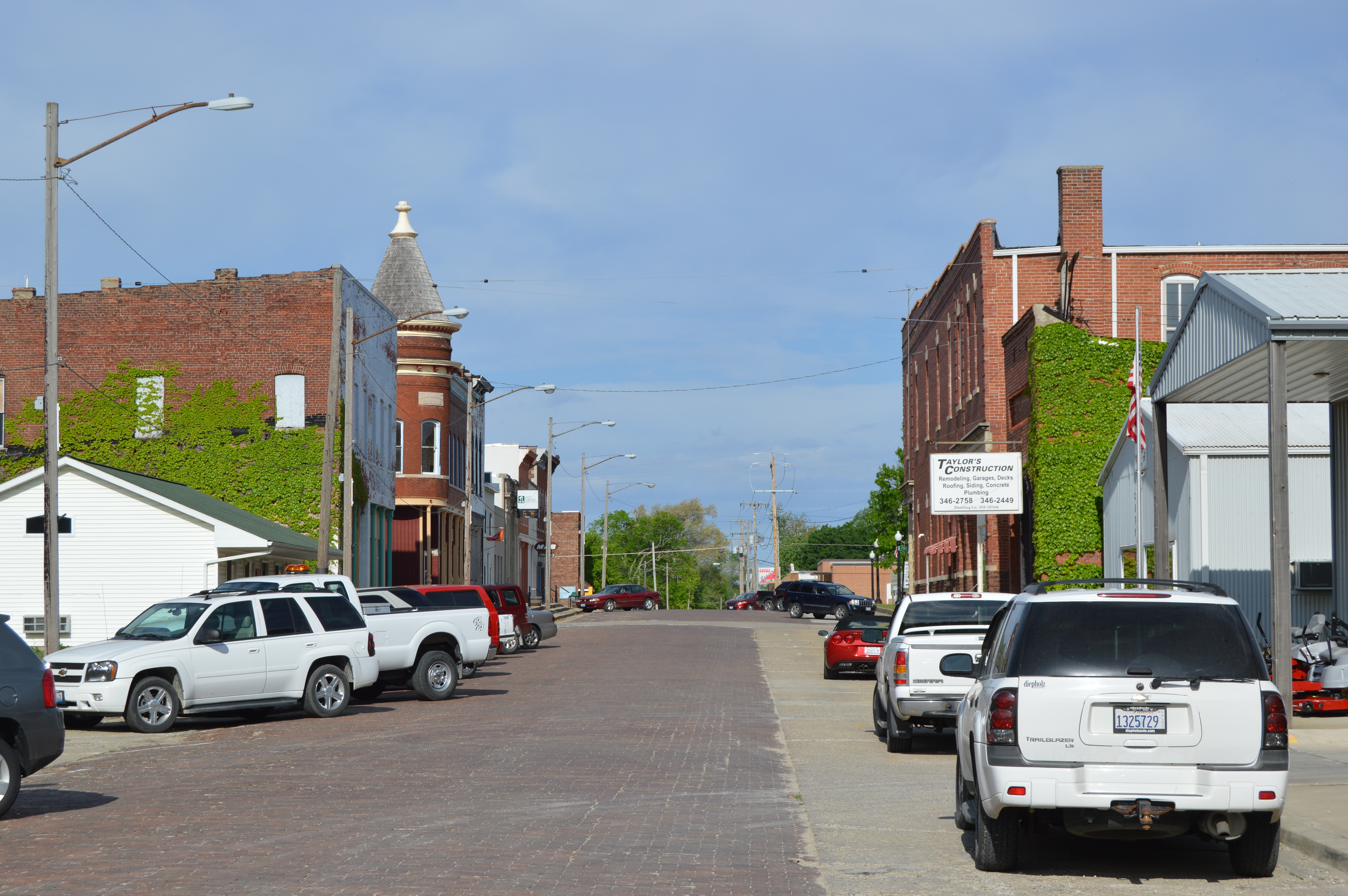
- Main Street

- Location of Oakland in Coles County, Illinois.
- Coordinates: 39°39′27″N 88°01′40″W
- Country: United States
- State: Illinois
- County: Coles
- Township: East Oakland

Area
  - Total: 0.82 sq mi (2.12 km^{2})
  - Land: 0.78 sq mi (2.03 km^{2})
  - Water: 0.035 sq mi (0.09 km^{2})
- Elevation: 659 ft (201 m)

Population (2020)
  - Total: 739
  - Density: 944.4/sq mi (364.64/km^{2})
- Time zone: UTC-6 (CST)
  - Summer (DST): UTC-5 (CDT)
- ZIP Code(s): 61943
- Area code: 217
- FIPS code: 17-54781
- GNIS ID: 2395288

Oakland is a city in Coles County, Illinois, United States. The population was 739 at the 2020 census. Oakland is the nearest community to Walnut Point State Park.

== History ==
Oakland, formerly known as Independence, was platted in 1833.

Pioneer doctor and abolitionist Hiram Rutherford moved to Oakland in 1840 to start his practice in the young town. He became a prominent citizen. Rutherford is best known for his involvement in the 1847 Matson Trial, which involved his friend Abraham Lincoln. A Kentucky slave owner, General Robert Matson, annually brought slaves to work on his land near Oakland. One year, a family of slaves ran away from the farm and took refuge with Rutherford and Gideon Ashmore. Matson sued the men for harboring slaves; Rutherford and Ashmore countered that the slaves could not legally be held in a free state. Rutherford attempted to have Lincoln represent him in the case, but Lincoln had already agreed to represent the slave owner. Matson, represented by Lincoln, lost the case in Coles County court.

Rutherford's home and office, as well as other historic sites, are maintained and available for tours.

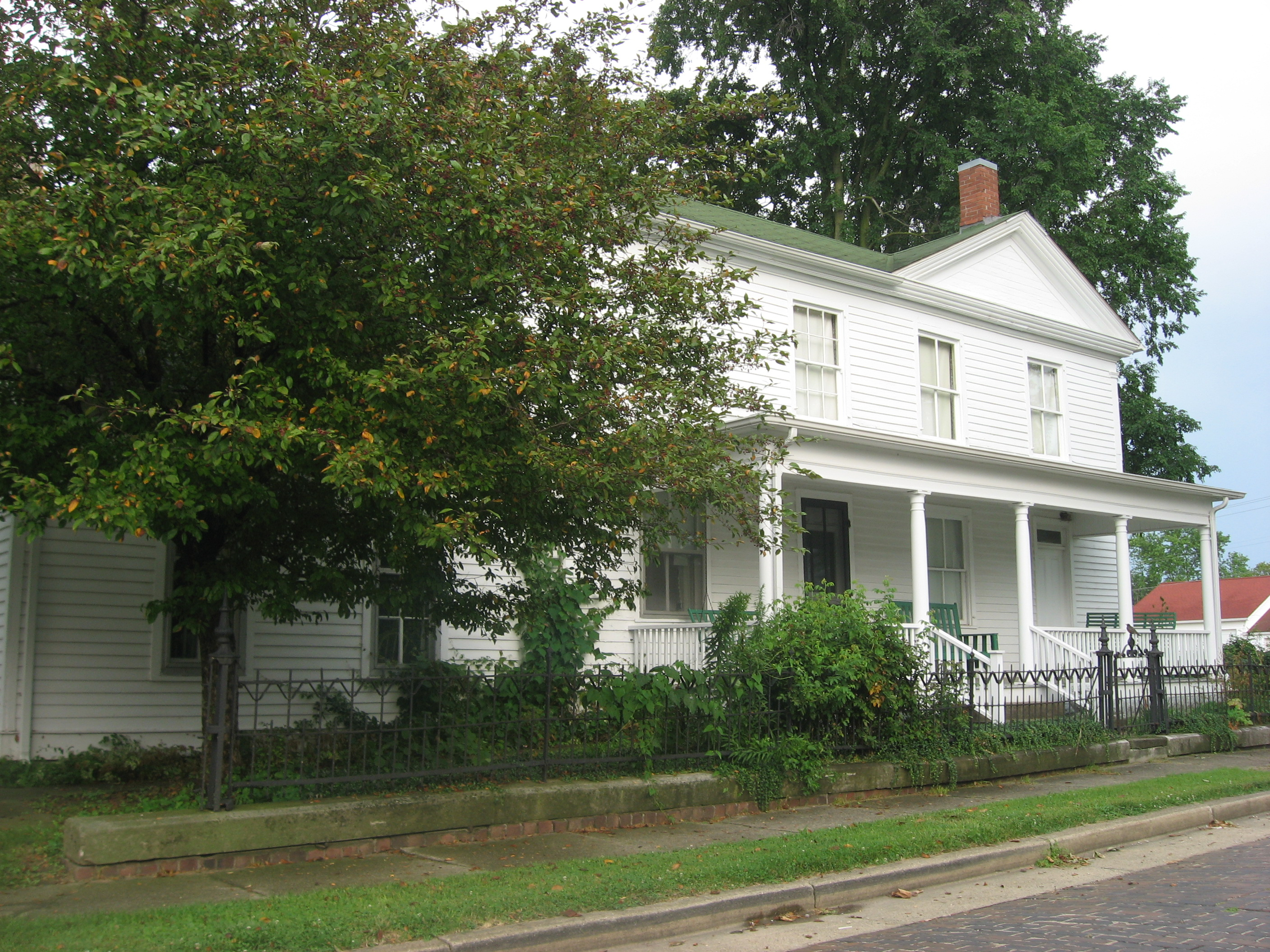
The home of Dr. Hiram Rutherford. He was an abolitionist in Oakland and friend of Abraham Lincoln and was involved in the 1847 Matson Trial, where he was charged with harboring runaway slaves and found not guilty.

== Geography ==
According to the 2021 census gazetteer files, Oakland has a total area of 0.82 square miles (2.12 km^{2}), of which 0.78 square miles (2.02 km^{2}) (or 95.60%) is land and 0.04 square miles (0.10 km^{2}) (or 4.40%) is water.

== Demographics ==
Historical population
Census	Pop.	Note	%±
1880	727		—
1890	995		36.9%
1900	1,198		20.4%
1910	1,159		−3.3%
1920	1,210		4.4%
1930	1,036		−14.4%
1940	1,131		9.2%
1950	980		−13.4%
1960	939		−4.2%
1970	1,012		7.8%
1980	1,035		2.3%
1990	996		−3.8%
2000	996		0.0%
2010	880		−11.6%
2020	739		−16.0%
U.S. Decennial Census

As of the 2020 census there were 739 people, 494 households, and 272 families residing in the city. The population density was 902.32 inhabitants per square mile (348.39/km^{2}). There were 387 housing units at an average density of 472.53 per square mile (182.44/km^{2}). The racial makeup of the city was 94.72% White, 0.41% African American, 0.14% Native American, 0.27% Asian, 0.14% Pacific Islander, 0.27% from other races, and 4.06% from two or more races. Hispanic or Latino of any race were 2.17% of the population.

There were 494 households, out of which 25.3% had children under the age of 18 living with them, 42.71% were married couples living together, 1.82% had a female householder with no husband present, and 44.94% were non-families. 42.11% of all households were made up of individuals, and 18.22% had someone living alone who was 65 years of age or older. The average household size was 2.93 and the average family size was 2.15.

The city's age distribution consisted of 25.0% under the age of 18, 8.1% from 18 to 24, 18.1% from 25 to 44, 28.6% from 45 to 64, and 20.2% who were 65 years of age or older. The median age was 42.1 years. For every 100 females, there were 82.8 males. For every 100 females age 18 and over, there were 92.5 males.

The median income for a household in the city was $41,806, and the median income for a family was $64,000. Males had a median income of $41,816 versus $25,288 for females. The per capita income for the city was $24,515. About 8.5% of families and 15.4% of the population were below the poverty line, including 7.5% of those under age 18 and 8.4% of those age 65 or over.

== Education ==
Oakland is home to Oakland Community Unit School District 5.

== Transportation ==
Coles County Zipline provides dial-a-ride bus transit service to the city. The nearest passenger rail service is at Mattoon station, where Amtrak operates to Chicago, Carbondale, New Orleans, and other destinations.

== Notable people ==
- Rich T. Buckler (1865–1950), member of the United States House of Representatives from Minnesota
- Robert Matson (1796–1859), a slave owner involved in the 1847 Matson Trial
- Chris Miller (born 1954), state representative for Illinois's 110th district
- Mary Miller (born 1959), U.S. representative for Illinois's 15th congressional district.
- Stanton C. Pemberton (1858–1944), businessman and Illinois state senator
- Hiram Rutherford, a doctor and abolitionist involved in the 1847 Matson Trial
