= Robert Mattson =

Robert Mattson may refer to:

- Robert Mattson (businessman) (1851–1935), Finnish shipowner and businessman
- Robert W. Mattson Jr. (born 1948), American lawyer and politician in Minnesota
- Robert W. Mattson Sr. (1924–1982), American army veteran, lawyer, and politician in Minnesota

== See also ==
- Robert Matson (1796–1859), Kentucky plantation owner
