= State cessions =

U.S. areas ceded by states to the federal government

A map of the United States showing land claims and cessions from 1782 to 1802

The state cessions are the areas of the United States that the separate states ceded to the federal government in the late 18th and early 19th centuries. The cession of these lands, which for the most part lay between the Appalachian Mountains and the Mississippi River, was key to establishing a harmonious union among the former British colonies.

The areas ceded comprise 236,825,600 acres (370,040.0 sq mi; 958,399 km^{2}), or 10.4 percent of current United States territory, and make up all or part of 10 states. This does not include the areas later ceded by Texas to the federal government, which make up parts of five more states.

== Background ==
Most of the British American colonies were established in the 17th and early 18th century when geographical knowledge of North America was incomplete. Many of these colonies were established by royal proclamation or charter that defined their boundaries as stretching "from sea to sea"; others did not have western boundaries established at all. These colonies thus ended up with theoretical extents that overlapped each other and conflicted with the claims and settlements established by other European powers. The British government's Royal Proclamation of 1763, while not resolving the disputes over the colonies' trans-Appalachian claims, succeeded in slowing down the movement of people into the region and the making of new claims in it. Many, however, ignored the proclamation, and various frontier settlement enterprises, owing allegiance to disparate colonial governments, continued.

By the time of the American Revolution, the boundaries between the Thirteen Colonies that became the United States had been for the most part surveyed and agreed upon. Their land claims also corresponded in varying degrees to the actual reality on the ground in the west at the eve of the Revolution. Kentucky, for instance, was organized into a county of Virginia in 1776, with Virginia serving as practical sovereign over the area until its admission into the Union as a separate state in 1792. Massachusetts's claims to land in modern-day Michigan and Wisconsin, by contrast, amounted to little more than lines drawn on a map.

The Treaty of Paris (1763) that ended the war known as the French and Indian War in North America had France cede most of its claims to land on the continent to Great Britain and Spain. Great Britain, gaining the eastern half of France's southern lands, extended the claims of its colonies of Massachusetts, Connecticut, Virginia, North Carolina, South Carolina, and Georgia to the Mississippi River; in some cases, this reinforced earlier charter claims.

== The resolution of the claims ==
The Treaty of Paris (1783) that ended the American Revolution established American sovereignty over the land between the Appalachians and the Mississippi; the jobs of determining how that land should be governed, and how the conflicting claims to it by several of the states should be resolved, were one of the first major tasks facing the new nation.

The potential for trouble arising from these claims was twofold. One problem was obvious: in many cases more than one state laid claim to the same piece of territory, but clearly only one would be ultimately recognized as the sovereign. The other conflict also threatened the peace of the new union. Only seven of the thirteen states had western land claims, and the other, "landless" states were fearful of being overwhelmed by states that controlled vast stretches of the new frontier. Virginia in particular, which already encompassed 1 in 5 inhabitants of the new nation, laid claim to modern-day Kentucky, and the vast territory it called Illinois County, and the smaller states feared that it would come to completely dominate the union.

In the end, most of the trans-Appalachian land claims were ceded to the federal government between 1781 and 1787; New York, New Hampshire, and the hitherto unrecognized Vermont government resolved their squabbles by 1791, and Kentucky was separated from Virginia and made into a new state in 1792. The cessions were not entirely selfless—in some cases the cessions were made in exchange for federal assumption of the states' Revolutionary War debts—but the states' reasonably graceful cessions of their oft-conflicting claims prevented early, perhaps catastrophic, rifts among the states of the young republic, and assuaged the fears of the "landless" states enough to convince them to ratify the new United States Constitution. The cessions also set the stage for the settlement of the Upper Midwest and the expansion of the U.S. into the center of the North American continent, and also established the pattern by which land newly acquired by the United States would be organized into new states rather than attached to old ones.

Georgia held on to its claims over trans-Appalachian land for another decade, and this claim was complicated by the fact that much of the land was also disputed between the United States and Spain. When Georgia finally sold the land west of its current boundaries to the United States for cash in 1802, the last phase of western cessions was complete.

== Details of the cessions ==
=== States with land claims ===
State	Date ceded	Date accepted	Claims and cessions
Connecticut	May 11, 1786	May 28, 1786	Ceded a swath between present north and south border-latitudes west to the Mississippi River, across present-day Pennsylvania (notably the Wyoming Valley disputed in the Pennamite–Yankee War), Ohio, Michigan, Indiana, and Illinois, except for a portion south of Lake Erie. Sovereignty over this "Western Reserve" was ceded to the federal government in 1800.
Georgia	April 24, 1802	June 16, 1802	Ceded the "Yazoo lands", between 35th parallel and 31st parallel of latitude west to the Mississippi River, across present-day Alabama and Mississippi. Unique among the cessions, Georgia charged the federal government $1.25 million for this land, which it apparently paid.
Massachusetts	November 13, 1784	April 19, 1785	Ceded a swath between present north and south border-latitudes west, across present-day New York, Michigan and Wisconsin, to which it was entitled by its interpretation of its original sea-to-sea grant from The British Crown.
New York	February 19, 1780	October 29, 1782	Ceded claims west of Lake Ontario. New York was allowed to keep the land claimed by it and Massachusetts west of the Preemption Line in 1786, which eventually became Western New York.
North Carolina	December 22, 1789	February 25, 1790	Ceded its trans-Appalachian Washington District, a swath between present north and south border-latitudes west to the Mississippi River, from which the federal government created the Southwest Territory, and subsequently the State of Tennessee.
South Carolina	March 8, 1787	August 9, 1787	Ceded a swath, approximately 12 miles (19 km) wide (north–south), west from its northwestern tip to the Mississippi River, across extreme southwest North Carolina, northern Georgia, plus the southern edge of present-day Tennessee, along with the northern edge of present-day Alabama and Mississippi. In a separate agreement, South Carolina and Georgia adjusted their common boundary. Note that the claim by South Carolina had been for land between the headwaters of the Savannah River and the southern boundary of North Carolina, and thence westward. In fact, however, later and more accurate surveying showed that the headwaters of the Savannah River actually extended into North Carolina. This meant that this strip of land for South Carolina had actually been illusory.
Virginia	January 2, 1781	March 1, 1784	Ceded its vast claim to the territory north of the Ohio River, which would subsequently become the Northwest Territory, but initially retained its remaining trans-Appalachian claim, the Kentucky County, south of the Ohio and east of the Mississippi River – present-day Kentucky. Also ceded land to the federal government that became part of the District of Columbia; this land was later retroceded back to Virginia.

=== States without land claims ===
State	Notes
Delaware	No land claim farther west. Its western border forms part of the Mason–Dixon line.
Maryland	No land claim farther west, but ceded land to the federal government that became part of the District of Columbia (and is now the entirety of it). Maryland's northern border forms part of the Mason–Dixon line.
New Hampshire	Prior to the American Revolution, New Hampshire claimed territory west of Connecticut River, in present-day Vermont, territory that was also claimed by New York. The resulting "New Hampshire Grants" dispute led to the rise of the Green Mountain Boys and the later establishment of the Vermont Republic. New Hampshire's claim upon the land was extinguished in 1764 by royal order of George III, and in 1790 the State of New York ceded its land claim to Vermont for 30,000 dollars.
New Jersey	No land claim farther west.
Pennsylvania	Original land grant from King Charles II of England to William Penn was for the land between the 42nd parallel and the 38th parallel in latitude, and extending west five degrees in longitude from the western boundary of New Jersey and northwestern boundary of Delaware. Its southern border forms part of the Mason–Dixon line. Pennsylvania claimed the portion of land along Lake Erie commonly known as the Erie Triangle; after Massachusetts and Connecticut ceded their claims to it, the Erie Triangle was sold to Pennsylvania by the federal government in 1792.
Rhode Island	No land claim farther west.

== Texas ==
Map of Texas, illustrating the area under de facto control of the Republic of Texas (in light yellow); the full extent of the Texan claim (light yellow and green); and modern-day borders of the State of Texas

Later in the 19th century, there was one more case of a state ceding some of its land to the federal government. Before the Republic of Texas joined the United States in 1845, it claimed a good deal of land that had never been under the de facto control of the Texan government – Texan attempts to exercise control of these territories as a sovereign state (most famously, the Santa Fe expedition) had ended in disaster. Thus, there was a border dispute between Texas, Mexico, and Native American tribes that the U.S. government inherited upon the annexation of Texas. This was one of the causes of the Mexican–American War of 1846–47 (another being the western land aspirations of the U.S. coupled with the refusal by the United Mexican States to sell its territory to the U.S.). After the American victory in that war, the Mexican government recognized American sovereignty over the disputed Texan lands and also ceded/sold the land extending west to the Pacific Ocean. The Mexican government was paid $25,000,000 under the Treaty of Guadalupe Hidalgo of 1848.

In addition, the maximalist land claims of the Republic of Texas did not set the northern and western borders of the State of Texas. Most, but not all, of its northern boundary had been set by a treaty between the United States and the Spanish Empire – along the Red River.

In an act of Congress, the Compromise of 1850, Texas ceded its conflicting northern and western territorial claims to the U.S. in return for debt relief, removing its conflicting claims from the U.S. territorial gains of the Mexican–American War. This ceded land eventually became portions of the states of Kansas (1861), Colorado (1876), Wyoming (1890), Oklahoma (1907), and New Mexico (1912).

== See also ==
- Ohio Country
- Illinois Country
- Historic regions of the United States
- Territorial evolution of the United States
- Trans-Appalachia
