= List of cases involving Abraham Lincoln =

This List of cases involving Abraham Lincoln concerns litigation in which Abraham Lincoln participated as a lawyer. He brought cases in local courts, the Illinois Supreme Court and the United States Supreme Court during his career before he became President of the United States.

== Illinois Supreme Court ==
Abraham Lincoln was counsel of record in approximately 175 cases before Illinois' highest court. The history website of the Illinois Supreme Court lists all of these cases that have official citations, beginning with Scammin vs Wine, 3 Ill. 456 (1840), through to State of Illinois v. Illinois Central Railroad Company, 27 Ill. 64 (1861).

- People ex rel. Stevenson v. Higgins, 15 Ill. 110 (1853), concerning trustees of a hospital. Lincoln represented Higgins. He lost on the point of who, precisely, was empowered by common law to exercise the right of removal. Lincoln argued that it should only be the legislature, the governor, or the Supreme Court, but not the hospital's trustees; the court held that the trustees too could exercise the power of removal.
- Sprague v. Illinois River Railroad Co., 19 Ill. 174 (1857), effect of amendment to railroad company's charter on liability of stockholders.

== US Supreme Court ==
- Lewis v. Lewis, 48 U.S. 776 (1849), on the interpretation of an Illinois statute of limitations
- Williamson v. Barrett, 54 U.S. 101 (1851), steamboat damages

== See also ==
- United States labor law
- United States corporate law
- United States tort law
- Matson Trial, in which Lincoln defended a slave-owner against a slave seeking his freedom.
