= Dr. Hiram Rutherford House and Office =

Historic house in Illinois, United States

- U.S. National Register of Historic Places
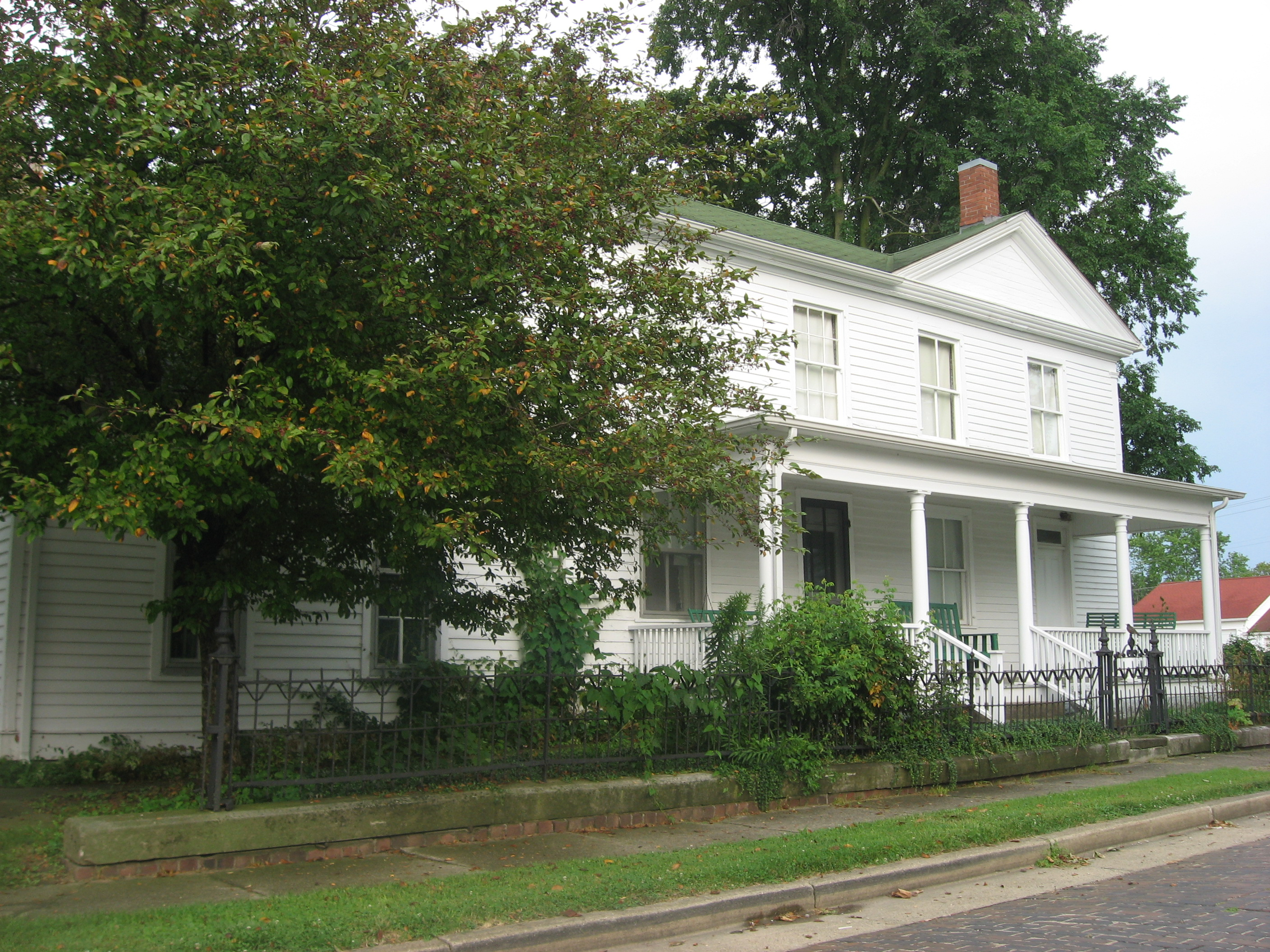

- Location within Illinois Location within the United States
- Location: 14 S. Pike St., Oakland, Illinois
- Coordinates: 39°39′15″N 88°1′38″W
- Area: 0.4 acres (0.16 ha)
- Built: 1846
- Architectural style: I-house
- NRHP reference No.: 82002523
- Added to NRHP: June 3, 1982

The Dr. Hiram Rutherford House and Office is a historic house located at 14 S. Pike St. in Oakland, Illinois. The house was built in 1846 for Dr. Hiram Rutherford, a doctor who settled in Oakland in 1840. Rutherford was one of the first settlers in the village, which was then known as Independence. Rutherford's house had an L-shaped I-house plan with Greek Revival details, including triangular pediments at the ends of its gable roof.

Rutherford was also known as an active abolitionist and was the defendant in the Matson Slave Trial in 1847. Kentucky slaveholder Robert Matson had brought his slaves to his farm near Oakland, and after the slaves escaped to Rutherford's house, Matson sued to recover his slaves. Abraham Lincoln defended Matson in the trial, the only known case in which Lincoln defended a slaveholder. The court ruled that Matson's slaves were freed, as Matson held them in the state and slavery was illegal under state law.

The house was added to the National Register of Historic Places on June 3, 1982.

== See also ==
- History of slavery in Illinois
