= Indigenous Pride LA =

LGBTQIA+ rights non-governmental organization

- Founded: 2017
- Type: Advocacy organization
- Purpose: LGBTQ activism; Native American activism
- Location: United States
- Region served: Los Angeles County
- Methods: advocacy; support groups; education
- Website: www.indigenouspridela.org

Indigenous Pride LA is Los Angeles County's only Native American LGBT+ Pride organization and event. It celebrates two-spirit, Indigiqueer, and Indigenous LGBTQPAI+ culture, identities, and heritage.

== History ==
Indigenous Pride LA formed in 2017, as a result of discussions regarding a possible festival that celebrated and honored Native American LGBT+ roles and traditions. They have walked in various pride events in Los Angeles to celebrate the experience of Indigenous LGBT rights.

Indigenous Pride LA's first event was held in October 2018 at the Barnsdall Art Park.

Since 2019, Autry Museum of the American West has hosted several of Indigenous Pride LA's annual LGBT+ Pride events.

Two of the founding members, Gabby Leon and Terri Jay, were honored by the Los Angeles Blade in 2023 as the most committed activists for their work with Indigenous Pride LA, which “honors, and acknowledges all indigenous peoples’ plight, especially those who are Two Spirit and/or identified with the contemporary labels and terms of cisgender and transgender lesbian, gay, bisexual, queer, asexual, and intersex.”
