= Otto and Verdell Rutherford House =

- Rutherford House
- U.S. National Register of Historic Places
- Portland Historic Landmark
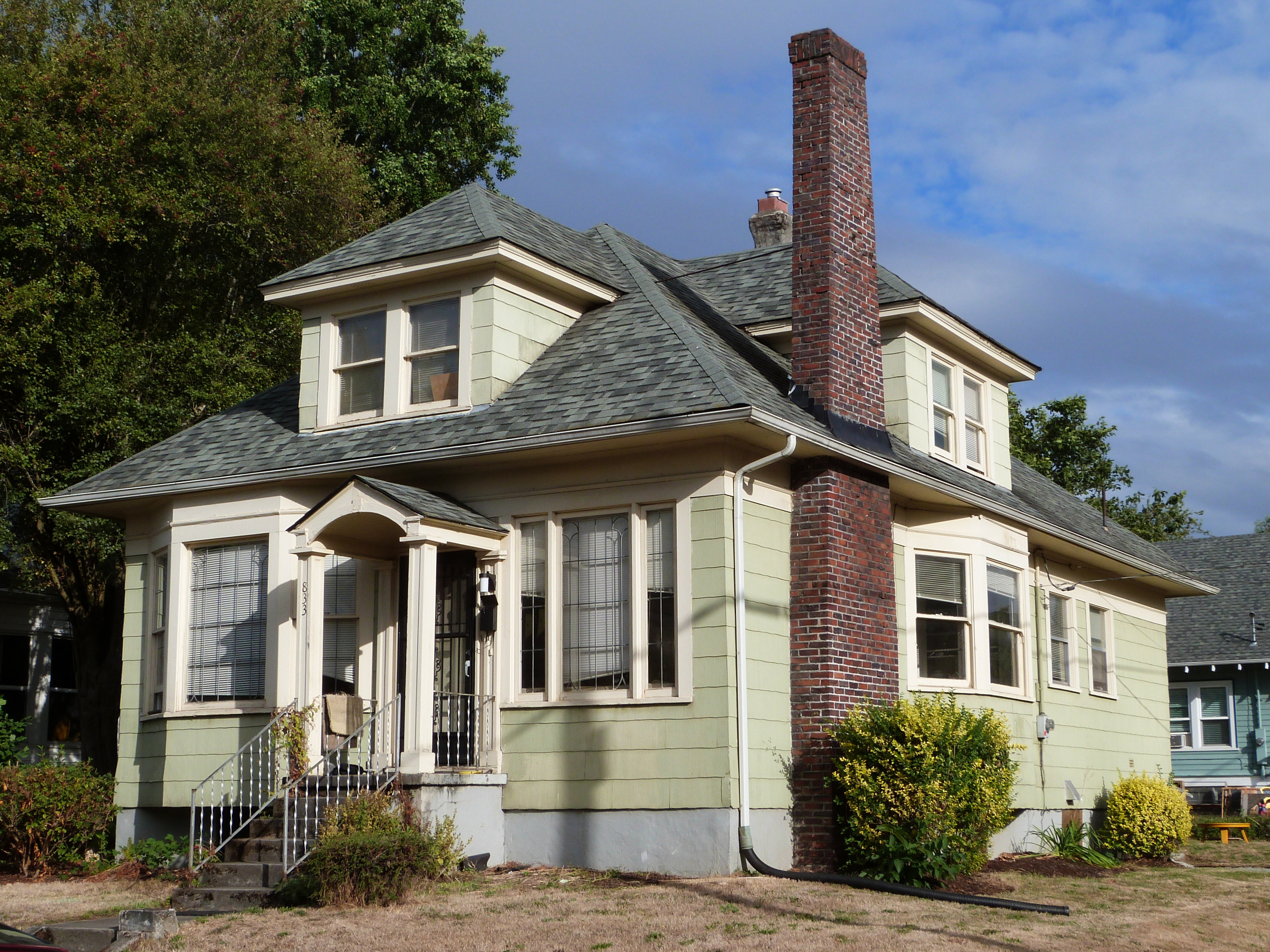
- The house in 2014

- Location within the United States Location within Oregon Location within Portland, Oregon
- Location: 833 NE Shaver Street; Portland, Oregon
- Coordinates: 45°33′08″N 122°39′25″W
- Built: c. 1905
- Architectural style: Craftsman bungalow
- NRHP reference No.: 14001076
- Added to NRHP: August 5, 2015

The Otto and Verdell Rutherford House is a historic building in Portland, Oregon, United States. Otto Rutherford (1911–2000) and Verdell Burdine Rutherford (1913–2001) were leaders in the civil rights movement in Oregon, importantly as president (Otto, from 1952 to 1954) and secretary (Verdell, from the late 1940s through 1962) of the NAACP Portland branch. Their house became a center of meeting, organization, planning, and publishing in support of the African American community's struggle for equal rights. A notable success came with passage of the 1953 Oregon Public Accommodations Act, attributable in large measure to the Rutherfords' work.

The house, built around 1905, was bought in 1923 by William H. and Lottie Rutherford, Otto's parents. It was located in the Albina district, the only place in Portland where the elder Rutherfords could purchase due to exclusionary redlining. Otto and Verdell Rutherford married and moved into the house in 1936. It was entered on the National Register of Historic Places in 2015.

== See also ==
- National Register of Historic Places listings in Northeast Portland, Oregon
- Fair-Rutherford and Rutherford Houses, homes in the extended Rutherford family in Columbia, South Carolina
