= Robert Matson =

American politician

Member of the Kentucky House of Representatives
- In office 1832–1836

Personal details
- Born: January 1796 Bourbon County, Kentucky, U.S.
- Died: January 26, 1859 (aged 62–63)
- Resting place: Matson Family Cemetery; Fulton County, Kentucky, U.S.
- Spouse: Mary Ann Corbin (m. 1848)
- Children: 6
- Occupation: Plantation owner

Military service
- Allegiance: United States
- Branch/service: United States Army
- Rank: Lieutenant
- Battles/wars: War of 1812

Robert Matson (January 1796 – January 26, 1859) was a plantation owner in Kentucky who also owned a farm in Illinois. He was a veteran of the War of 1812 and a slave owner. He was also a two term legislator in the Kentucky legislature. In Illinois in 1847 he was represented by Abraham Lincoln, then a lawyer, in the Matson Trial, a freedom suit legal dispute over ownership of slaves (a mother and her daughters) in the free soil state of Illinois.

Matson was the son of James Matson and Mary Peyton of Virginia. He married Mary Ann Corbin of Virginia on 23 November 23, 1848 in Gallatin County, Illinois. She was born in Virginia on May 4, 1821. They had six children.

Matson was a Lieutenant in Robert Pogue's 4th Regiment of volunteers from Kentucky during the War of 1812. He later served the Kentucky Militia where it is said, although not confirmed, that he was appointed as a General. He served in the Kentucky House of Representatives representing Bourbon County during the 1832 and 1834 sessions.

The two judges deciding the case of whether his slaves were in transit in Illinois or were free based on state law concluded they were free. The family moved to Liberia months later and Matson returned with his new wife to Kentucky.

Matson is buried at the Matson Family Cemetery near Hickman, Kentucky.

== See also ==
- History of slavery in Illinois
