= Ohio Country =

Historical region in North America

Coordinates: 40.5°N 82.5°W

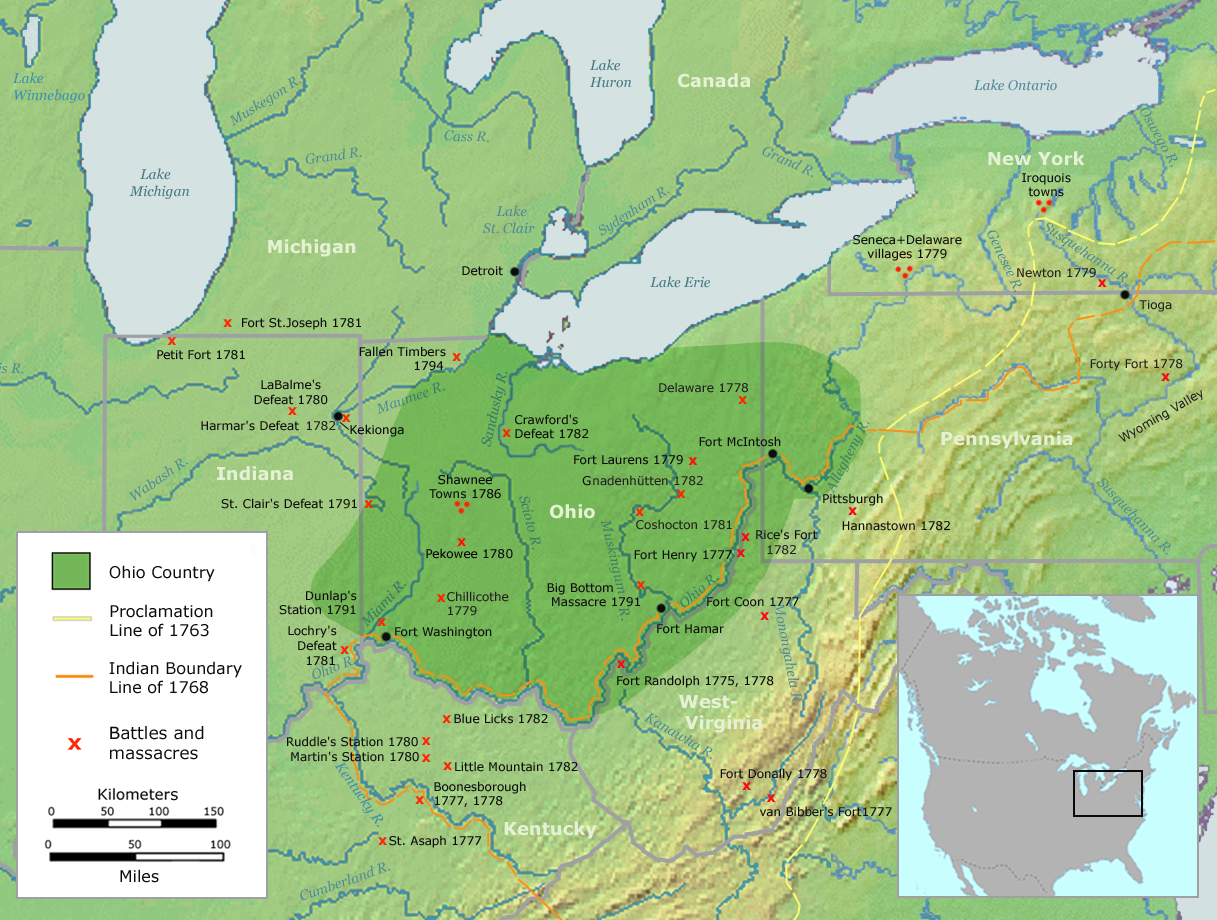
Map of Ohio Country showing battles in the area between 1775 and 1794

The Ohio Country (Ohio Territory, (Note: 'Ohio Territory' is a misnomer, since it was never an organized territory of the United States or of any other nation.) Ohio Valley (Note: The French referred to the area as the Ohio Valley.)) was a loosely defined region of colonial North America west of the Appalachian Mountains and south of Lake Erie.

Control of the territory and the region's fur trade was disputed in the 17th century by the Haudenosaunee, Wyandot (Huron), Algonquian, other Native American tribes, and France. New France claimed this area as part of the administrative district of La Louisiane. France and Britain fought the French and Indian War over this area in the mid-18th century as the North American front of their Seven Years' War (1756–1763). Following the British victory, France ceded its territory east of the Mississippi River to the British Empire in the 1763 Treaty of Paris.

During the following decades, several minor frontier wars, including Pontiac's Rebellion and Lord Dunmore's War, were fought in the territory. In 1783, the Ohio Country became unorganized U.S. territory under the Treaty of Paris that officially ended the American Revolutionary War and became one of the first American frontier regions of the United States. Several of the original U.S. states had overlapping claims to portions of it, based on historical royal and colonial charters. The states' claims were largely extinguished after negotiations with the federal government by 1787, and it became part of the larger, organized Territory Northwest of the River Ohio. Most of the former areas north-west of the Ohio River were eventually organized as the state of Ohio, admitted to the Union in 1803.

== History ==
=== Pre-colonial period ===
Ohio Country areas impacted by the 17th century Beaver Wars

In the 17th century, the area north of the Ohio River was occupied by the Algonquian-speaking Shawnee and some Siouan language-speaking tribes, such as the Omaha and Ponca. Around 1660, during a conflict known as the Beaver Wars, the Haudenosaunee and their allies seized control of the Ohio Country, driving out the Shawnee and Siouan peoples. Those tribes mostly moved further northwest and west, with several eventually settling west of the Mississippi River. (Note: The Omaha, Ponca, and some Shawnee eventually migrated even further west, crossing into territory west of the Missouri River.) In the east, the Haudenosaunee (Iroquois) conquered and absorbed the Erie (who also spoke an Iroquoian language) during this time. The Ohio Country, however, remained largely uninhabited for decades, used primarily as a hunting ground by the Haudenosaunee.

In the 1720s, a number of Native American groups began to migrate into the Ohio Country from the east, driven by pressure from encroaching European colonists. By 1724, Delaware Indians had established the village of Kittanning on the Allegheny River in present-day western Pennsylvania. With them came those Shawnee who had historically expanded further to the east. Other eastern bands of the scattered Shawnee tribe began to return to the Ohio Country in the decades that followed. A number of Seneca and other Haudenosaunee peoples also migrated to the Ohio Country, moving away from the Anglo-French rivalries and warfare south of Lake Ontario. The Seneca were the westernmost of the original Five Nations of the Haudenosaunee centered in western New York. In 1722, the Tuscarora, an Iroquoian-speaking tribe from the Carolinas, completed a migration to the area and were allowed to settle near the lands of the Oneida. They were considered cousins to the Haudenosaunee and became the sixth nation in the confederacy.

=== Colonial period ===
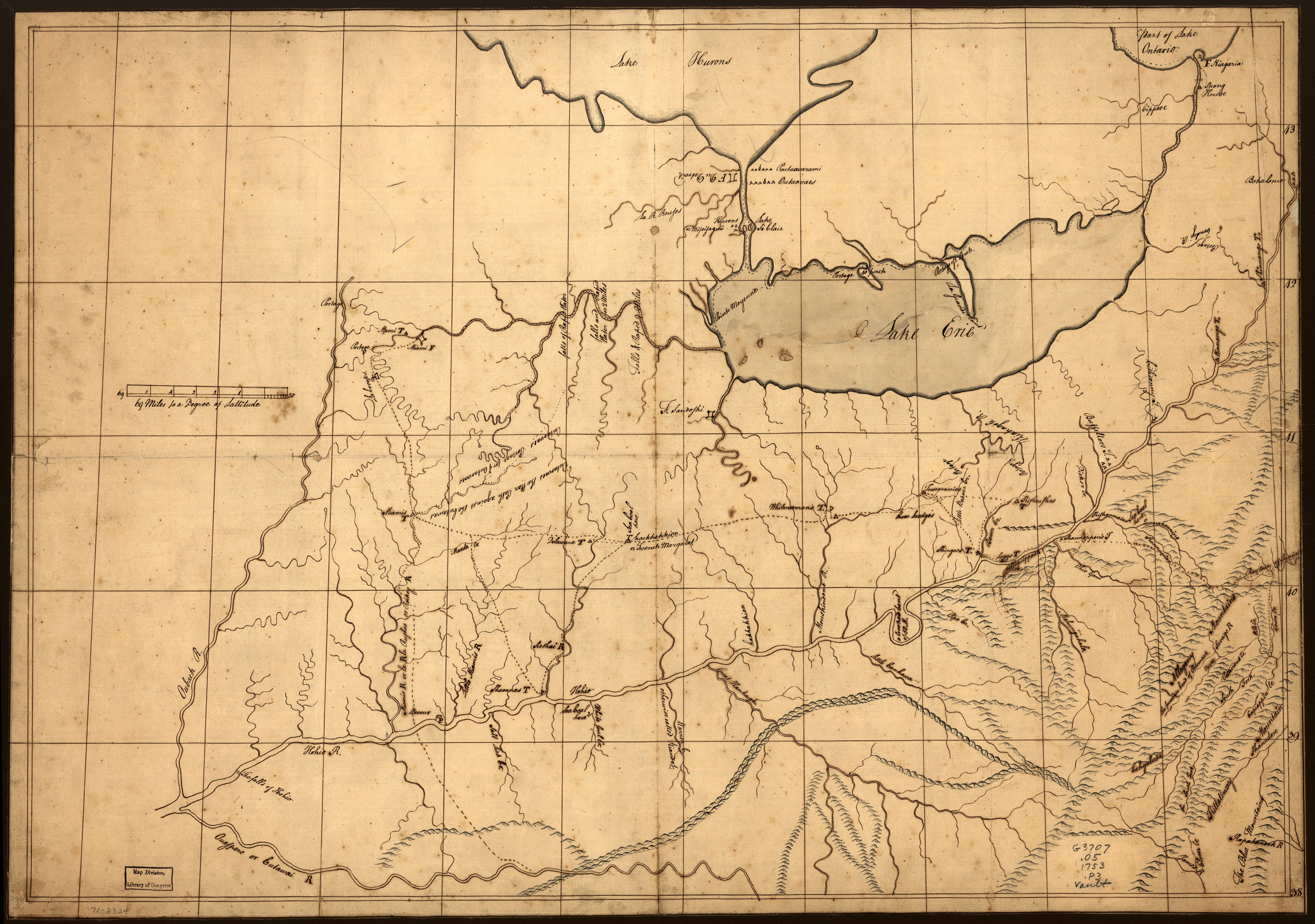
1752 trader's map by John Patten indicating that the borders of the Ohio Country were the Wabash River to the west, the Cumberland River to the south, Lake Erie to the north and the Thirteen Colonies to the east.

Map of Canada (New France) after 1713. At its fullest extent, Canada extended from south of the Great Lakes to the Gulf of St. Lawrence.

In the late 1740s and the second half of the 18th century, the British and French angled for control of the territory. The English intended to gain control of the area by sheer number of settlers on the ground. In 1749, The Crown through the government of the Colony of Virginia granted the Ohio Company a beneficial deal on this territory on the condition that it be settled by colonists from the Thirteen Colonies.

==== French and Indian War ====
With the arrival of Europeans to America, both Great Britain and France had claimed the territory and sent fur traders into the area to do business with the Ohio Country Indians. The Haudenosaunee League also claimed the region by right of conquest. The rivalry among the two European nations, the Haudenosaunee nations, and the Ohio valley Indian tribes for control of the region played an important part in the French and Indian War that lasted from 1754 through 1760. Having initially remained neutral, eventually the Ohio Country Indians largely sided with the French who were more interested in hunting in the region and were not actively settling the area as was their British colonial rivals. Armed with supplies and guns from the French, the Indians launched raids against their enemies via the Kittanning Path east of the Alleghenies. After they destroyed Fort Granville in the summer of 1756, Pennsylvania's Proprietary Governor John Penn ordered Captain John Armstrong to destroy the Shawnee villages west of the Alleghenies, hoping to put an end to their raiding activities. Meanwhile, other British and colonial forces drove the French from Fort Duquesne. They built Fort Pitt at the confluence of the Allegheny and Monongahela rivers that form the Ohio River. (Note: The Ft. Pitt settlement later developed into the city of Pittsburgh, Pennsylvania.) After being defeated by Britain, France ceded their claims to the entire Ohio Country in the 1763 Treaty of Paris. They had done so, however, without consulting their Native American allies who—in many cases—continued the fight against the colonial frontiersmen.

The Proclamation line of 1763 preserved the western lands for exclusive use by Native American peoples

Colonies such as Pennsylvania, Virginia, New York, and Connecticut claimed some of the westward lands as had been granted by their original charters. The area, however, was officially closed to European settlement by the Royal Proclamation of 1763, an attempt to preserve the western lands as territory exclusively set aside for use by Native American peoples. By enacting the treaty, the British Crown no longer recognized prior claims that the colonies made on this territory. On June 22, 1774, Parliament in England passed the Quebec Act, which annexed the region to the Province of Quebec. Colonists in the Thirteen Colonies considered this one of the Intolerable Acts that contributed to the call for American Revolution the following year, which began in earnest the following year, in 1775.

=== American Revolution and afterward ===
Despite the Crown's actions limiting westward expansion, frontiersmen from the Virginia and Pennsylvania colonies had migrated across the Allegheny Mountains for over a decade since the Proclamation. This eventually led them into conflict with the Shawnee tribes that claimed the area as their hunting grounds. The Shawnee, who referred to the settlers as the 'long knives', viewed the colonists as competitors to their resources and a threat to their way of life. Because of this, the Shawnee and other Indian tribes of the Ohio Country, chose to side with the British against the American colonists during the American Revolutionary War. They hoped to expel the colonists permanently from their lands.

In 1778, after several Patriot military victories in the region by an expeditionary force led by General George Rogers Clark, the Virginia legislature organized a nominal civil government over the area. They called this first official territory Illinois County, Virginia. It encompassed all of the lands lying west and north of the Ohio River to which Virginia had previously laid claim.

The high water mark of the Native American struggle to retain control of the region was in 1782, when the Ohio Valley Indian Nations met with the British in a war council at Chalawgatha, a Shawnee village located along the Little Miami River, where they planned what was to become a successful rout of the Americans two weeks later at the Battle of Blue Licks. In 1783, following the Treaty of Paris in which America had gained its independence, Britain ceded its claims over the area to the new United States. The new federal government immediately opened this area to settlement by American pioneers, considering it unorganized territory. The Ohio Country quickly became one of the most desirable locations for Trans-Appalachian settlements, in particular among veterans of the Revolutionary War, who were often granted land in lieu of pay for their military service during the war.

In the treaties of Fort Stanwix (late 1784) and Fort McIntosh (early 1785), the United States fixed boundaries between territory open to settlement and the native tribal lands. The Shawnee and other tribes, however, continued to resist American encroachment into their historic hunting grounds. This resistance eventually led to the Northwest Indian War.

== States' claims ==
The respective claims of the original 13 states to western lands.

Considered highly desirable, the area was subject to the overlapping and conflicting territorial ambitions of several eastern states:

- Connecticut claimed a strip of land across the northern part of the region, delineated by the westward extension of its northern and southern state boundaries, called the Connecticut Western Reserve.
- New York claimed an elastic part of the region based on its perceived sovereignty over the Haudenosaunee, though the majority of the four tribes, allies of the British, resettled in Upper Quebec and Ontario).
- Pennsylvania claimed land as a westward extension of its colonial boundaries.
- Virginia, claimed the entire region and more, originally based on the charter of the Virginia Colony. It later claimed Illinois County by right of conquest.

== Incorporation of the Northwest Territory ==
After negotiation with the federal government, these states ceded their claims to the United States between 1780 and 1786. In July 1787, most of Ohio Country, the southern peninsula of what is today the state of Michigan, and eastern Illinois Country were incorporated as the Territory Northwest of the River Ohio. In 1803, most of what was formerly Ohio Country north and west of the Ohio River was admitted to the union as the state of Ohio.

== See also ==
- Gnadenhutten massacre
- Illinois County, Virginia which encompassed Ohio Country and part of Illinois Country
- Nanfan Treaty
