= Autry Museum of the American West =

Museum in California, United States

Autry National Center of the American West
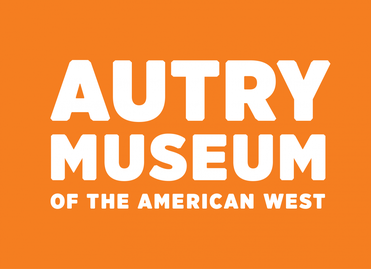

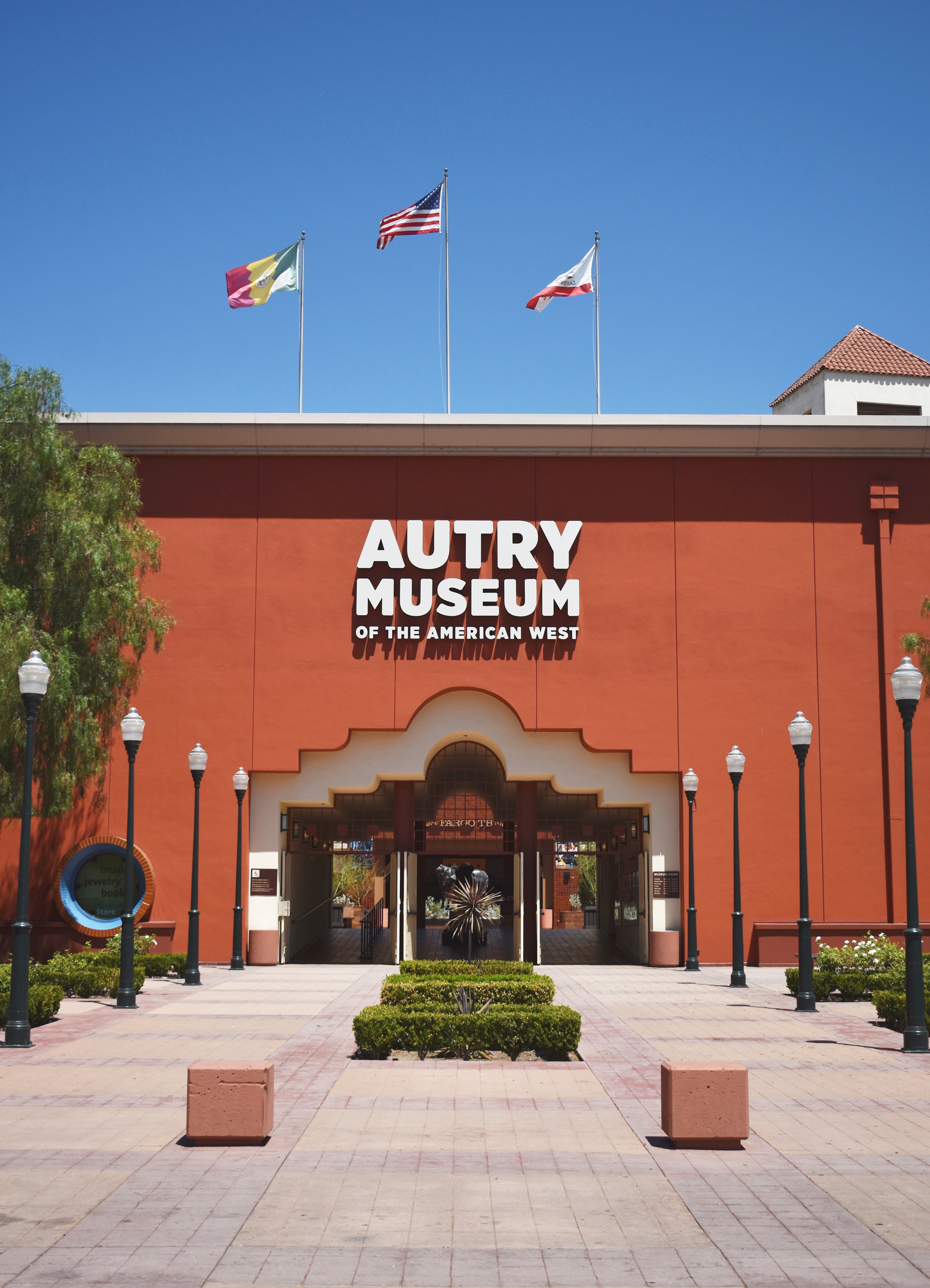
- Former name: Autry National Center
- Established: 2003
- Location: 4700 Western Heritage Way, Griffith Park; Los Angeles, California
- Coordinates: 34.1487°N 118.2813°W
- Type: Western and American Indian
- Presidents: Stephen Aron, President and CEO
- Website: www.theautry.org

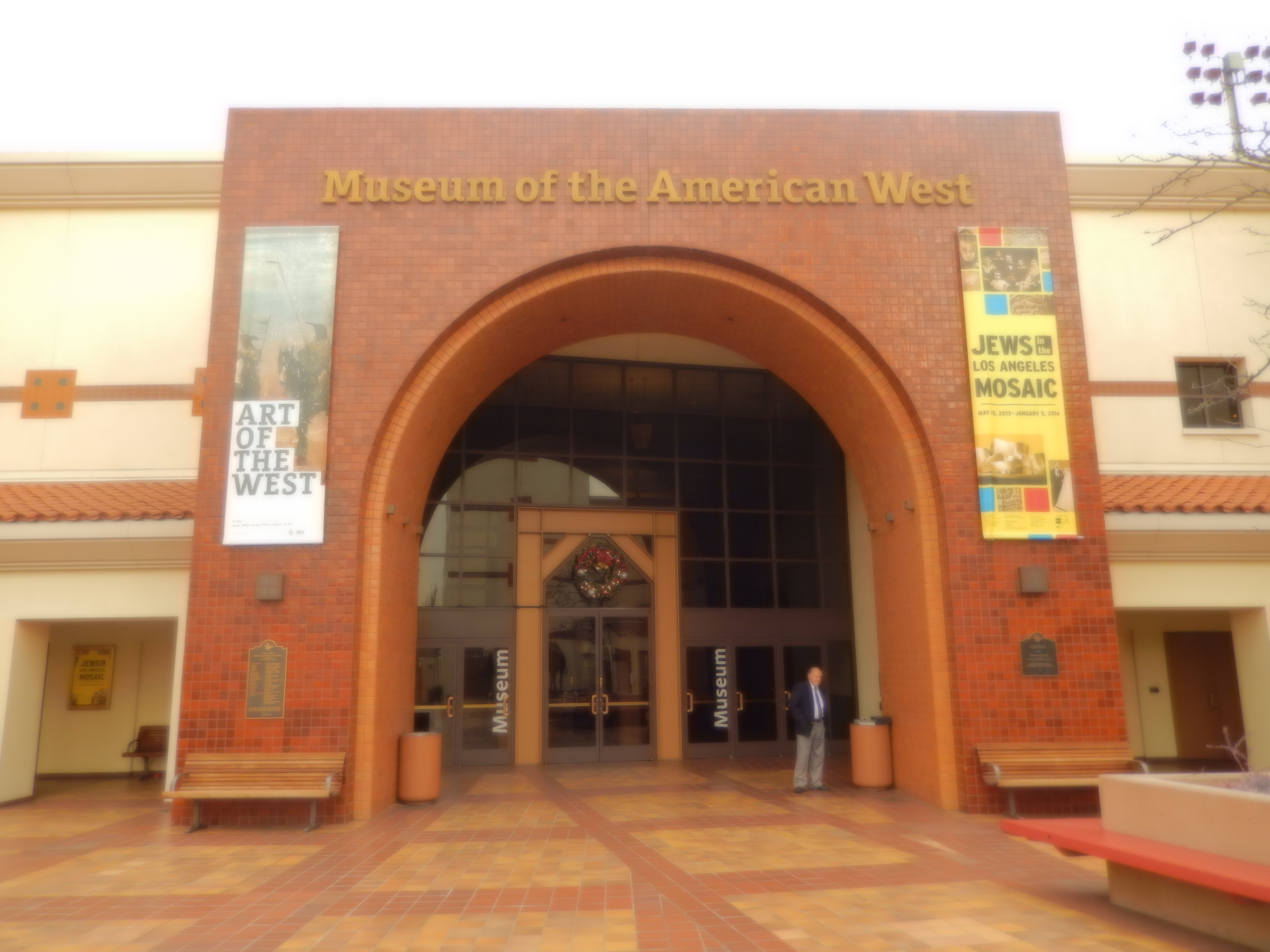
Entrance to museum section

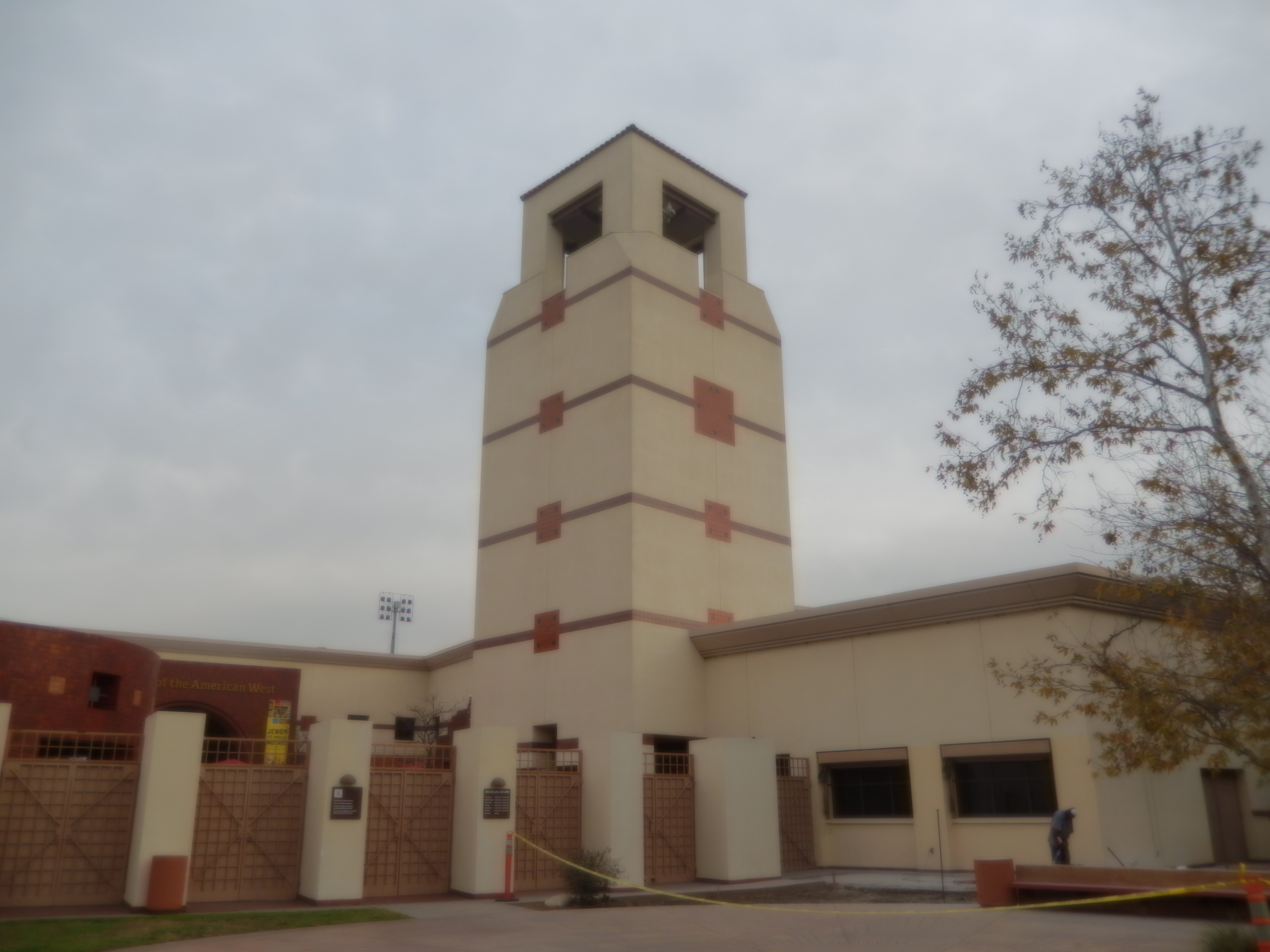
Tower at Autry Museum

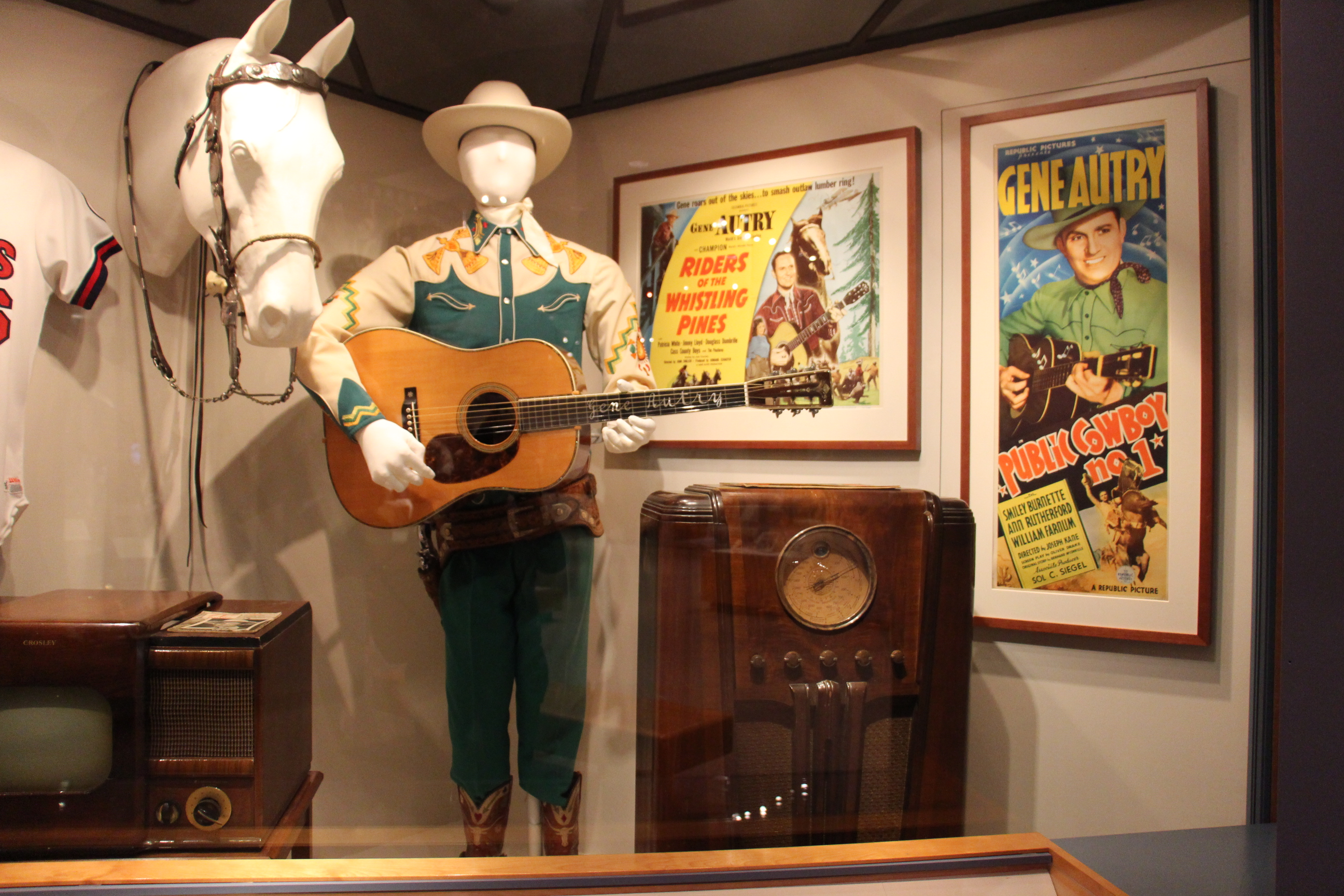
Display of Gene Autry memorabilia, including his iconic Martin D-45 guitar, the first one made

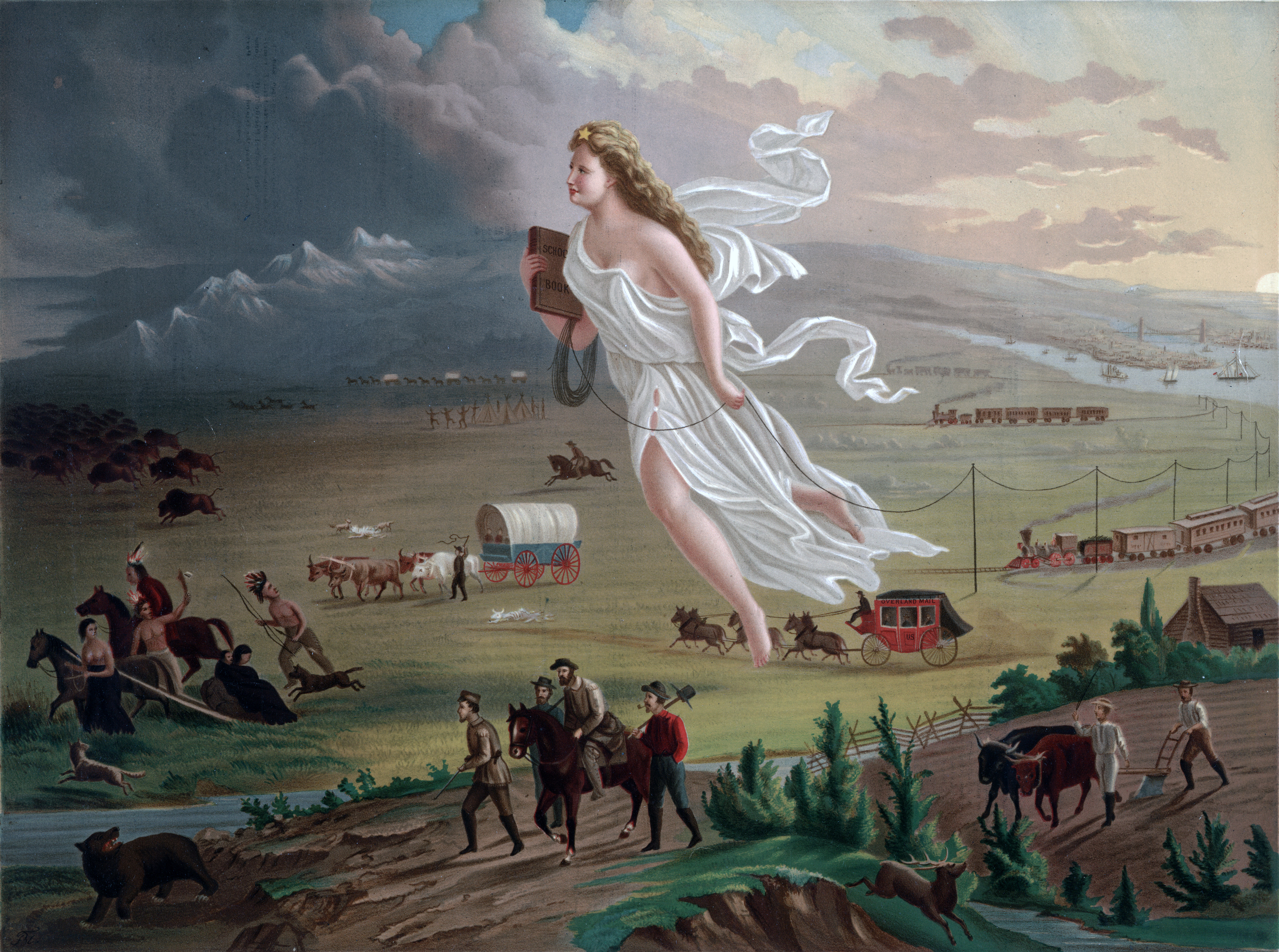
The museum owns the iconic painting American Progress (1872), by artist John Gast

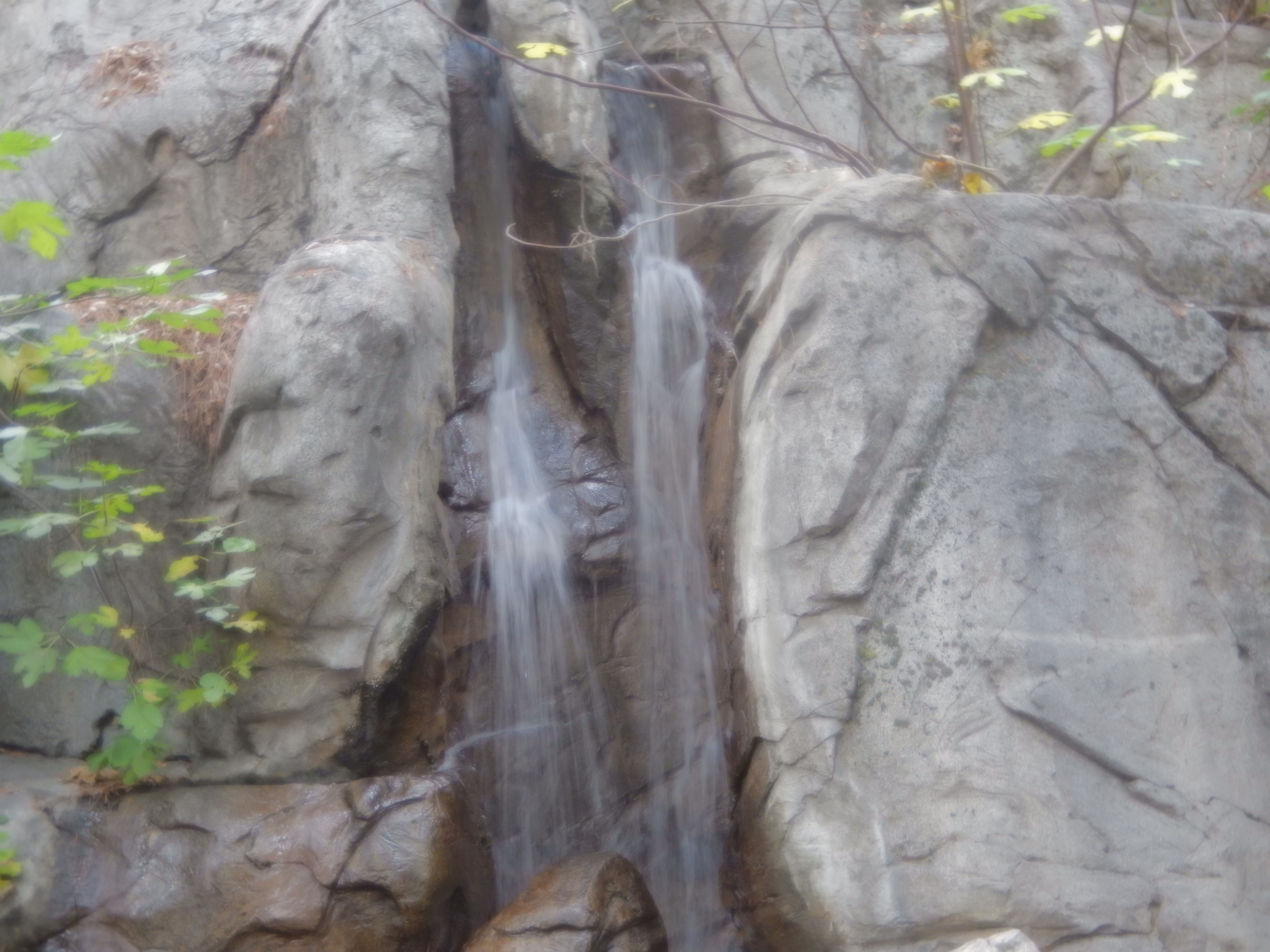
Exterior cascade exhibit at Autry Museum

The Autry Museum of the American West (Autry National Center) is a museum in Los Angeles, California, dedicated to exploring an inclusive history of the American West. Founded in 1988, the museum presents a wide range of exhibitions and public programs, including lectures, film, theater, festivals, family events, and music, and performs scholarship, research, and educational outreach. It attracts about 150,000 visitors annually.

In 2013, it extensively redesigned and renovated the Irene Helen Jones Parks Gallery of Art and the Gamble Firearms Gallery in its main building. In its related opening exhibit for the Parks Gallery, Art of the West, the new organization enabled material to be presented in relation to themes rather than chronology, and paintings were shown next to crafts, photography, video and other elements in new relationships.

== Locations ==
The Autry Museum of the American West has two sites, about 8 miles (13 km) apart:

- Griffith Park – 4700 Western Heritage Way, Los Angeles, California, 90027
- Resources Center – 210 South Victory Blvd, Burbank, California 91502 (Storage facility with a ritual space for indigenous people to use items in the collection in ceremonies)

== History ==
The Autry was established in 1988 by actor and businessman Gene Autry as "Gene Autry Western Heritage Museum," dedicated to exploring and sharing the comprehensive story of the American West and its multiple cultures, as well as further interpreting the West's significance. Its Griffith Park collection includes 21,000 paintings, sculptures, costumes, textiles, firearms, tools, toys, musical instruments, and other objects. The museum contains contemporary and historical exhibitions, year-round programs for children, intellectual forums, and the Native Voices at the Autry performing arts series.

In 2003, the Autry acquired the Southwest Museum of the American Indian.*

In 2010, the Autry Museum received the International Gay Rodeo Association archives, thereby becoming the leading repository of gay rodeo items.

The museum is located in Griffith Park directly across from the Los Angeles Zoo. The 4,000-square foot Parks Gallery was renovated in 2013 and has been organized into three theme areas: Religion and Ritual, Land and Landscape, Migration and Movement. The main location also contains two mini galleries with revolving exhibits.

The Gamble Firearms Gallery also was renovated in 2013. It now shows more of the context and place of firearms in the Old West; curators grouped firearms by themes: "hunting and trapping, the impact of technology on firearms, the conservation movement and the West in popular culture." The Firearms Gallery is part of the larger Western Frontiers: Stories of Fact and Fiction Gallery.

From 2004 to 2015, it was known as the Autry National Center of the American West. However, in October 2015, the museum began using the name "Autry Museum of the American West" to emphasize its "principal activities as a museum."

Since 2019, the Autry Museum has hosted several of Indigenous Pride LA LGBT+ Pride events.

The museum's founding director was Joanne Hale, who served from the museum's founding in 1988 until her retirement in 1998. Under her leadership, the museum went from concept to a 148,000 square foot building with seven galleries and 45,000 piece collection. Under her tenure, more than 50 special exhibitions were presented and the museum received accredidation from the American Association of Museums. John Gray was president and CEO from 1999 to 2012 and led the museum through its expansion into the Autry National Center and the mergers with the Southwest Museum of American Indian and the Women of the West Museums. W. Richard West Jr. was president and CEO from 2012 to 2021. He is Cheyenne and Arapaho Indian and was previously the founding director of the Smithsonian National Museum of the American Indian. Under his leadership, the Autry did more Native-led interpretation and engaged in a more complex understanding of Western History. Since 2021, UCLA historian Stephen Aron has been the president and CEO. Previously, he led the Autry Institute's Institute for the Study of the American West.

== Collection ==
The Autry's Southwest Museum of the American Indian Collection of Native American art is one of the most significant collections dedicated to Native culture in the United States, second only to the Smithsonian Institution National Museum of the American Indian. The 238,000-piece collection includes 14,000 baskets, 10,000 ceramic items, 6,300 textiles and weavings, and more than 1,100 pieces of jewelry. It represents work by indigenous peoples from Alaska to South America, with an emphasis on cultures of California and the Southwestern United States.

The Library and Archives of the Autry includes the collections of the Braun Research Library and the Autry Library. It is a research enterprise that supports scholarly work in Western history and the arts. In 2002, the Women of the West Museum of Colorado merged with the Autry Museum. This has broadened the scholarly and educational emphasis to include gender issues and women's experiences in the American West.

== Programs ==
Since 1995, Native Voices at the Autry has been the only existing equity theater solely focused on producing new works by Native American, Alaska Native, and First Nation playwrights. Randy Reinholz, a member of Oklahoma's Choctaw Nation, and his wife Jean Bruce Scott have run the program for 20 years. Native Voices has produced over 34 full productions, gone on over 20 tours, with 23 new play festivals and 13 Native playwrights. This program is a crucial part of the Autry's mission to promote art history and cultures of the American West.
