= The Trans-Appalachian Frontier: People, Societies, and Institutions, 1775–1850 =

1978 non-fiction book

- Title page for The Trans-Appalachian Frontier: People, Societies, and Institutions, 1775–1850 (1978)
- Author: Malcolm J. Rohrbough
- Language: English
- Subject: American frontier
- Genre: History, Non-fiction
- Publisher: Oxford University Press (first edition), Indiana University Press (third edition)
- Publication date: 1978 (first edition), 2008 (third edition)
- Pages: 460
- ISBN: 978-0195022094 978-0195022094 is the first edition; The ISBN of the current (third) edition is 978-0253219329
- Website: Indiana University Press (third edition)

The Trans-Appalachian Frontier: People, Societies, and Institutions, 1775–1850 is a book written by Malcolm J. Rohrbough and published by Oxford University Press in 1978 (first edition) and Indiana University Press (third edition) in 2008. The work covers the history of European and American migration, settlement, and community development in the Trans-Appalachian Frontier (Note: Roughly the area west of the Proclamation Line of 1763 and east of the Mississippi River) from before United States independence in 1775 until the Compromise of 1850.

== Structure ==
The book (Note: Refers to the third edition) contains an introduction and normal front material. The body of the work is divided in six parts which are divided into 16 chapters, and ends with notes, an extensive bibliography and an index.

- Part 1: Across the mountains. Covers "The search for security" (chapter 1), "The search for stability" (chapter 2) and "Security and stability in the territory Northwest of the Ohio".
- Part 2: The Widening Frontier (1795–1815). Covers "The reach of government and the authority of law spread across the western county" (chapter 4), "Diverse economies moving towards commercial ends" (chapter 5), and "Many varied societies emerge across the western country" (chapter 6).
- Part 3: The first great migration (1815–1830). Covers "Across the old northwest and into Missouri" (chapter 7) and "The flowering of the cotton frontier" (chapter 8).
- Part 4: The enduring frontier. Covers "Michigan: The Great Lakes frontier" (chapter 9), "Florida: A sectional frontier" (chapter 10), and "Arkansas: A frontier more West than South" (chapter 11).
- Part 5: The Second Great Migration (1830–1850), Covers "The new counties of Alabama and Mississippi: A frontier more South than West" (chapter 12) and "The last frontier of the Old Northwest: Illinois, Iowa, and Wisconsin" (chapter 13).
- Part 6: The Transappalacian West and the Nation. Covers "Villiages, Towns, and Cities spread across the western country" (chapter 14), "Changing political patterns across three generations" (chapter 15), and "The Transappalacian West and the Natio" (chapter 16).

== Academic reviews ==
- Rundell, Walter (1979). "Reviewed work: The Trans-Appalachian Frontier: People, Societies, and Institutions, 1775-1850, Malcolm J. Rohrbough". The American Historical Review. 84 (4): 1150–1151. doi:10.2307/1904793. JSTOR 1904793.
- Brogan, Hugh (1981). "Reviewed work: The Trans-Appalachian Frontier: People, Societies, and Institutions 1775-1850, Malcom J. Rohrbough". Social History. 6 (2): 271. JSTOR 4285095.
- Burchell, R. A. (1980). "Reviewed work: The Trans-Appalachian Frontier: People, Societies and Institutions, 1775-1850, Malcolm J. Rohrbough". Journal of American Studies. 14 (2): 288. doi:10.1017/S0021875800002115. JSTOR 27553841.
- Green, Michael D. (1979). "Reviewed work: The Trans-Appalachian Frontier: People, Societies, and Institutions 1775-1850, Malcolm J. Rohrbough". The Georgia Historical Quarterly. 63 (2): 312–313. JSTOR 40580522.
- Shapiro, Henry D. (1980). "Reviewed work: The Trans-Appalachian Frontier: People, Societies, and Institutions, 1775-1850, Malcolm J. Rohrbough". Indiana Magazine of History. 76 (2): 130–132. JSTOR 27790435.
- White, Lonnie J. (1979). "Reviewed work: The Trans-Appalachian Frontier: People, Societies, and Institutions, 1775-1850, Malcolm J. Rohrbough". The Journal of Southern History. 45 (3): 427–428. doi:10.2307/2208208. JSTOR 2208208.
- Davis, James E. (1979). "Reviewed work: The Trans-Appalachian Frontier: People, Societies, and Institutions, 1775-1850, Malcolm J. Rohrbough". The Journal of American History. 66 (2): 393–394. doi:10.2307/1900921. JSTOR 1900921.
- Goodstein, Anita S. (1979). "Reviewed work: The Trans-Appalachian Frontier: People, Societies and Institutions, 1775-1850, Malcolm J. Rohrbough". Tennessee Historical Quarterly. 38 (2): 245–247. JSTOR 42625971.
- Current, Richard N. (1979). "Reviewed work: The Trans-Appalachian Frontier: People, Societies, and Institutions, 1775-1850, Malcolm J. Rohrbough". The Wisconsin Magazine of History. 62 (3): 257–258. JSTOR 4635343.
- Wells, Charlotte W. (1979). "Reviewed work: The Trans-Appalachian Frontier: People, Societies, and Institutions, 1775- 1850, Malcolm J. Rohrbough". The Journal of Economic History. 39 (3): 811–812. doi:10.1017/S0022050700093505. JSTOR 2119741. S2CID 154449987.
- Guice, John D. W. (1980). "Reviewed work: The Trans-Appalachian Frontier: People, Societies, and Institutions, 1775-1850, Malcolm J. Rohrbough". Journal of Forest History. 24 (2): 104–105. doi:10.2307/4004508. JSTOR 4004508.
- Hine, Robert V. (1979). "Reviewed work: The Trans-Appalachian Frontier: People, Societies, and Institutions, 1775-1850, Malcolm J. Rohrbough". Agricultural History. 53 (4): 818–819. JSTOR 3742697.

== Citation ==
- Rohrbough, M. J. (1978). The Trans-Appalachian Frontier: People, Societies, and Institutions, 1775-1850. Oxford University Press. ISBN 978-0-19-502209-4.

== About the author ==
Malcolm J. Rohrbough is a historian and Professor Emeritus of History at the University of Iowa. They are the author of numerous works on the American west and frontier.

== Similar or related works ==
- Days of Gold: The California Gold Rush and the American Nation
- Aspen: The History of a Silver-Mining Town, 1879–1893
- Kentucke's Frontiers

== See also ==
- Territorial evolution of the United States
- Old Southwest
- Southwest Territory
- Northwest Territory
- Northwest Ordinance
