= Stephen Aron =

American historian and museum director

- Born: Queens, New York, U.S.
- Occupations: Historian and museum director

Academic background
- Education: Amherst College (BA); University of California, Berkeley (MA, PhD)

Academic work
- Discipline: History of the United States
- Sub-discipline: American frontier, borderlands, and the American West
- Institutions: Princeton University; University of California, Los Angeles; Autry Museum of the American West
- Notable works: How the West Was Lost; American Confluence; The American West: A Very Short Introduction; Peace and Friendship

Stephen Aron (born February 23, 1960) is an American historian and museum director specializing in the history of frontiers, borderlands, and the American West. He is the Calvin and Marilyn Gross Director, president, and chief executive officer of the Autry Museum of the American West in Los Angeles and a professor emeritus of history at the University of California, Los Angeles (UCLA).

Aron became president and chief executive officer of the Autry on July 1, 2021, succeeding W. Richard West Jr. Before assuming that position, he taught at UCLA for 25 years and held several academic and public-history leadership positions, including chair of UCLA's history department and founding executive director of the Autry's Institute for the Study of the American West.

== Early life and education ==
Aron was born and raised in Queens, New York. He initially planned to study colonial America and the early history of the United States but developed an interest in the history of the American West after he was assigned to teach a course on the subject at Princeton University.

He received a Bachelor of Arts degree from Amherst College in 1982. He subsequently attended the University of California, Berkeley, where he earned a master's degree in 1986 and a doctorate in history in 1990.

== Academic career ==
After completing his doctorate, Aron joined the faculty of Princeton University. He moved to UCLA in 1996, becoming a professor in the university's Department of History. His research and teaching have focused on the American frontier, intercultural relations, colonial North America, borderlands, and the place of the American West in global history.

At UCLA, Aron served as the Robert N. Burr Department Chair of History. He also served as president of the Western History Association.

Aron has described his academic and museum work as an effort to bridge the divide between academic history and public history by making historical scholarship accessible to broader audiences.

== Autry Museum of the American West ==
Aron's formal association with the Autry began in 2002, when he divided his professional appointment between UCLA and the museum. He became the founding executive director of the Autry's Institute for the Study of the American West, which was established as a research arm associated with the Autry and the Southwest Museum of the American Indian. He later served as chair of the institute.

In September 2020, the Autry announced that Aron would succeed W. Richard West Jr. as president and chief executive officer following West's retirement. Aron formally assumed the position on July 1, 2021, upon retiring from UCLA.

During Aron's tenure, the museum completed the transfer of approximately 400,000 Native American objects and related archival materials from the historic Southwest Museum campus to the Autry's Resources Center in Burbank. Aron said that one of the center's challenges was to make the collections more accessible, including by facilitating access for researchers and Native communities.

== Scholarship ==
Aron's scholarship examines how migration, trade, cultural exchange, settlement, and conflict shaped the North American frontier and the American West. His first book, How the West Was Lost: The Transformation of Kentucky from Daniel Boone to Henry Clay, examined the transition of Kentucky from a frontier society to a more hierarchical economic and political order.

In American Confluence: The Missouri Frontier from Borderland to Border State, Aron studied the area surrounding the junction of the Mississippi, Missouri, and Ohio rivers. The book traced the region's transformation from a multilingual and multicultural borderland into a state increasingly incorporated into the United States.

Aron's 2015 book, The American West: A Very Short Introduction, presented an overview of Western American history that emphasized interactions among Indigenous peoples, European empires, the United States, Mexico, migrants, and settlers.

In Peace and Friendship: An Alternative History of the American West, published in 2022, Aron examined periods of cooperation and peaceful coexistence among groups whose relationships have more commonly been presented through narratives of conquest and violence. He argued that these episodes, although often temporary, demonstrate that violent outcomes were not historically inevitable.

== Selected works ==
=== Books ===
- Aron, Stephen (1996). How the West Was Lost: The Transformation of Kentucky from Daniel Boone to Henry Clay. Baltimore: Johns Hopkins University Press. ISBN 9780801852961.
- Aron, Stephen (2006). American Confluence: The Missouri Frontier from Borderland to Border State. Bloomington: Indiana University Press. ISBN 9780253346919.
- Aron, Stephen (2015). The American West: A Very Short Introduction. New York: Oxford University Press. ISBN 9780199858934.
- Aron, Stephen (2022). Peace and Friendship: An Alternative History of the American West. New York: Oxford University Press. ISBN 9780197622780.

Aron is also a co-author of Worlds Together, Worlds Apart: A History of the World from the Beginnings of Humankind to the Present, a world-history textbook published in multiple editions by W. W. Norton & Company.
