= Tennessee Frontiers: Three Regions in Transition =

2001 book by John R. Finger

- Author: John R. Finger
- Language: English
- Subject: History of the United States, History of Tennessee
- Genre: History
- Publisher: Indiana University Press
- Publication date: 2001
- Pages: 382
- ISBN: 978-0253339850
- Website: Indiana University Press

Tennessee Frontiers: Three Regions in Transition is a book by John R. Finger published in 2001 by Indiana University Press. The work is part of the A History of the Trans-Appalachian Frontier series edited by Malcolm J. Rohrbough and Walter Nugent.

== Contents ==
The work looks at the Tennessee frontier from early European contact with Native Americans to the ethnic cleansing of Native Americans from the region in 1830. It addresses issues such as the development and expansion of the market economy, land hunger, speculation, political and military interactions with regional tribes, and the search for stability and security.

=== Structure ===
The work contains normal front material and begins with a foreword by the series editors and an introduction by the author, followed by eleven chapters:

1 Land, People, and Early Frontiers
2 Trade, Acculturation, and Empire: 1700-1775
3 The Revolutionary Frontier: 1775-1780
4 Expansion Amid Revolution: 1779-1783
5 Speculation, Turmoil, and Intrigue: 1780-1789
6 The Southwest Territory: 1790-1796
7 The Social Fabric
8 The Frontier Economy
9 Statehood to Nationalism: 1796-1815
10 The Western District: 1795-1840
11 Hegemony and Cherokee Removal: 1791-1840

It finishes with a conclusion and essay on sources by the author.

== Academic journal reviews ==
- Akridge, Scott (2003). "Reviewed work: Tennessee Frontiers: Three Regions in Transition, John R. Finger". The Arkansas Historical Quarterly. 62 (1): 96–98. doi:10.2307/40023309. JSTOR 40023309.
- Hofstra, Warren R. (2002). "Reviewed work: Tennessee Frontiers: Three Regions in Transition, John R. Finger". The Georgia Historical Quarterly. 86 (3): 457–460. JSTOR 40584575.
- O'Brien, Greg (2003). "Reviewed work: Tennessee Frontiers: Three Regions in Transition, John R. Finger". Indiana Magazine of History. 99 (1): 63–64. JSTOR 27792447.
- Ray, Kristofer (2003). "Reviewed work: Tennessee Frontiers: Three Regions in Transition, John R. Finger". Tennessee Historical Quarterly. 62 (3): 282–284. JSTOR 42627776.
- Waller, Altina L. (2003). "Reviews of Books:Tennessee Frontiers: Three Regions in Transition John R. Finger". The American Historical Review. 108: 185–186. doi:10.1086/533090.

== Publication details ==
Tennessee Frontiers: Three Regions in Transition, by John R. Finger was published by Indiana University Press in Hardback in 2001. John R. Finger is an emeritus professor of history at the University of Tennessee, Knoxville.

== Similar or related works ==
- Kentucke's Frontiers
- The Ohio Frontier: Crucible of the Old Northwest, 1720–1830
- The Trans-Appalachian Frontier: People, Societies, and Institutions, 1775-1850

== See also ==
- Territorial evolution of the United States
- American frontier
- History of Tennessee
- Southwest Territory
