= History of slavery in Illinois =

Illinois slavery

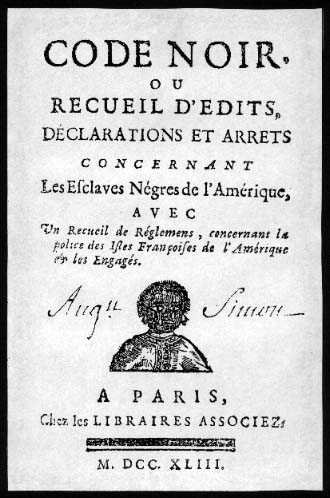
The Code Noir, an earlier version of the later Illinois Black codes regulated behavior and treatment of slaves and of free people of color in the French colonial empire, including the Illinois Country of New France from 1685 to 1763

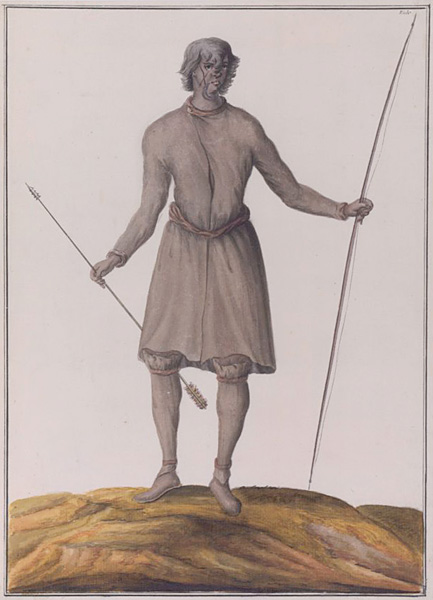
Indian slave of the Meskwaki tribe either in the Illinois Country or the Nipissing tribe in upper colonial French Canada, circa 1732

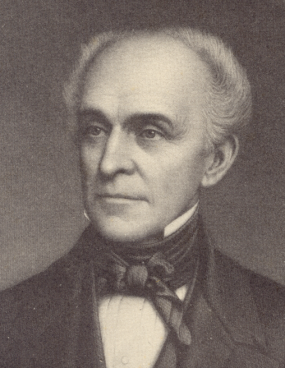
The second Governor of Illinois, Edward Coles brought his slaves from his home state of Virginia to give them their freedom when they arrived in Illinois.

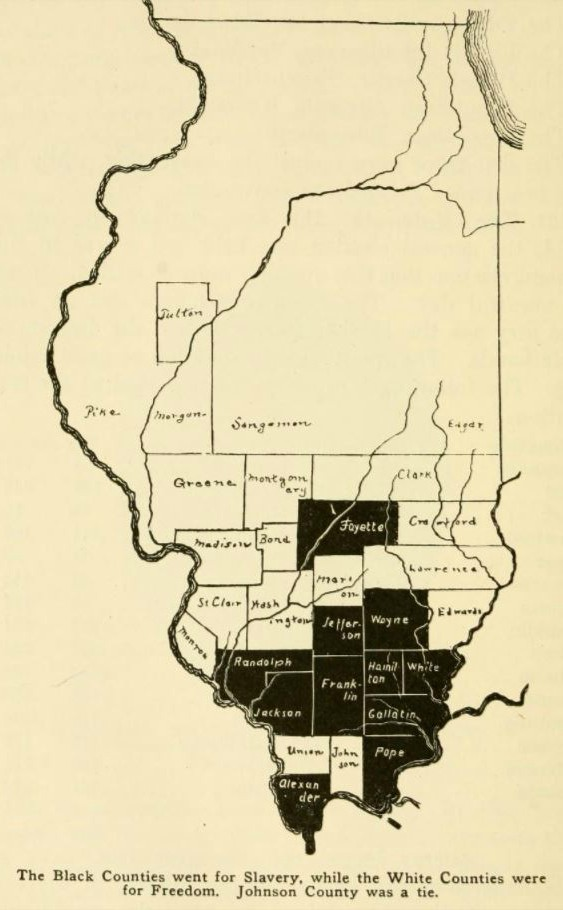
The majority of Illinois voters in 1824 rejected a proposal for a new constitutional convention that could have made slavery legal outright. A map of Illinois free and slave counties in 1824 showing shaded counties that were favorable to legalizing slavery in Illinois.

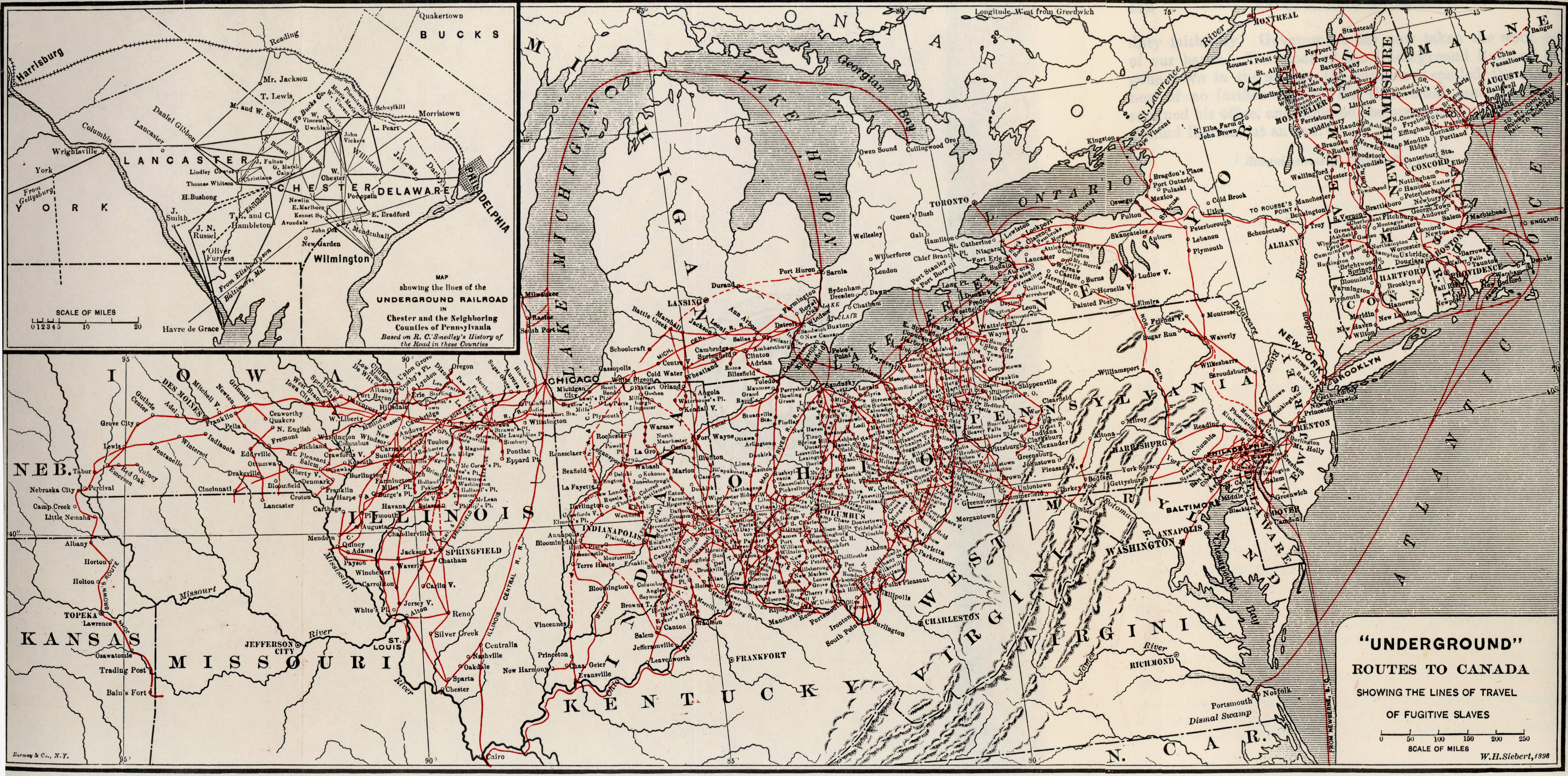
Map of the Underground Railroad from 1830 to 1865 including escape routes that went through Illinois

Slavery (chattel slavery) in what became the U.S. state of Illinois existed for more than a century. Illinois did not become a state until 1818, but earlier regional systems of government had already established slavery. France introduced African slavery to the Illinois Country in the early eighteenth century. French and other inhabitants of Illinois continued the practice of owning slaves throughout the Illinois Country's period of British rule (1763–1783), as well as after its transfer to the new United States in 1783 as Illinois County, Virginia. The Northwest Ordinance (1787) banned slavery in Illinois and the rest of the Northwest Territory. Nonetheless, slavery remained a contentious issue, through the period when Illinois was part of the Indiana Territory and the Illinois Territory and some slaves remained in bondage after statehood until their gradual emancipation by the Illinois Supreme Court. Thus the history of slavery in Illinois covers several sometimes overlapping periods: French (c. 1660s–1764); British (c. 1763–1783); Virginia (c. 1778–1785); United States Northwest Territory (1787–1800), Indiana Territory (1800–1809), Illinois Territory (1809–1818) and the State of Illinois (after 1818).

The geography of the state meant that its southern tip extended into the Upper South and was surrounded by territories that would eventually become the slave states of Kentucky and Missouri, meaning that southern Illinois would be more pro-slavery than the north of the state. Illinois residents expected newspaper arguments to appeal to republican principles, rather than material interests, reflecting the values of the time. When Illinois became a state, its constitution forbade the expansion of slavery, but allowed its existence under certain conditions, such as keeping already existing slavery (which was primarily in the south) intact, and tolerated brief visits from out-of-state slaves and their masters. Nevertheless, during the early decades of statehood, the number of slaves in Illinois dwindled, as the Illinois Supreme Court largely ruled against maintaining legacy slavery.

In the decade just before the American Civil War, an anti-Black law was adopted in the state, which made it difficult for new Black emigrants to enter or live in Illinois. This law led to organizing among the relatively small community of free blacks in Illinois and the state's first convention for black civil rights. Near the close of the civil war, Illinois repealed the anti-Black law and became the first state to ratify the Thirteenth Amendment to the Constitution of the United States, which abolished chattel slavery nationally.

== Colonial period ==
During the French colonial period of Illinois, Illinois was a part of the region known as the "Illinois Country", which also loosely encompassed lands that would become the future U.S. states of Indiana, Wisconsin, and Missouri. The Illinois Country was part of New France and was governed by its slavery laws. French settlers first brought African slaves into the Illinois Country from Saint-Domingue (present-day Haiti) around 1720 under the terms of the Code Noir, which defined the legal conditions of slavery in the French Empire and restricted the activities of free Negro people. Although older accounts claim that Philip François Renault imported five hundred Negro slaves to the Illinois Country in 1721, it is likely that he imported far fewer. A document "from 1720 describes the Jesuits as owning sixteen to eighteen slaves, 'Negroes and Savages.'" After an unsuccessful attempt at lead mining, Renault founded St. Philippe, Illinois, in 1723, and used his enslaved people for agricultural purposes to produce crops.

The institution of slavery continued after Britain acquired the eastern Illinois Country in 1763 following the French and Indian War. At the time, nine hundred slaves lived in the territory, although some of the French would take at least three hundred with them as they left the future state of Illinois for lands west of the Mississippi River (in future Missouri).

== United States territory ==
Slavery continued following the American Revolutionary War, when the territory was ceded to the United States. The first legislation against slavery was the Northwest Ordinance of 1787, which forbade slavery in the Northwest Territory. However, territorial laws and practices allowed human bondage to continue in various forms. Territorial governors Arthur St. Clair and Charles Willing Byrd supported slavery and did not enforce the ordinance. When the Indiana Territory (which included the future State of Illinois) was split from the Northwest Territory in 1800, territorial residents petitioned the United States Senate to allow slaves. A proposal offered emancipation to Illinois-born male slaves at age thirty-one and female slaves at age twenty-eight. Southern-born slaves were to be slaves for life. No response to the proposal was ever issued.

The Illinois Territory, created in 1809, kept the Indiana Territory's Black Code, which restricted free blacks and required them to carry documents to prove their freedom. Slaveowners could keep their workers in bondage by forcing them to sign indentures of very long length (40 to 99 years), threatening them with sale elsewhere if they refused. The age of majority to become enslaved was 28 for women and 31 for men. As a result, slave owners secured lifelong, uncompensated servitude contracts and sold black people in public venues and across states.^{[17]} Slaves also recorded deeds such as contracts, which had to be done at the local courthouse. Slaves had to consent voluntarily so they could be categorized as property. Some slaves even had to work in the state’s transportation and mining industries, but they played a significant role in the economy, including transportation, mining, and agriculture.^{[17]} Furthermore, free black people could be kidnapped and sold in St. Louis or states where such sales were legal. The Illinois Salines, a U.S. government-run salt works near Shawneetown was one of the largest businesses in the Illinois Territory; it exploited between 1,000 and 2,000 slaves hired out from masters in slave states (primarily Kentucky) to keep the salt brine kettles continuously boiling. Slaves and indentured servants attempted to challenge the system by demanding shorter sentences, more pay, or freedom.^{[17]} Some got freedom or some pay, but most failed and died before getting any pay, even if it was promised. Sometimes, enslaved people even tried turning to the local courts to try to negotiate their contracts.^{[17]} Freedom was rarely granted in court due to the power slave owners had. Slaveowners often relied on public support for slavery to legitimize their labor practices and maintain their power over black people. One example is slave owners often advertised enslaved African Americans in the newspaper so they could reinforce the idea of slavery.^{[17]} Prominent slave owners often bought and sold slaves for different needs.^{[17]}

== Slavery during statehood ==
While Illinois' first state constitution in 1818 stated that slavery shall not be "thereafter introduced", slavery was still tolerated in the early years of Illinois statehood, and the constitution did not have a clause forbidding an amendment to allow slavery. So, no new slavery could be introduced, but existing slaves had to stay as slaves. This caused a power fight between slave masters and slaves.^{[18]} However, due to the efforts of a coalition of religious leaders (Morris Birkbeck, Peter Cartwright, James Lemen, and John Mason Peck), publisher Hooper Warren and politicians (especially Edward Coles, Daniel Pope Cook and Risdon Moore), Illinois voters in 1824 rejected a proposal for a new constitutional convention that could have made slavery legal outright. Nicholas Hansen, a legislator at the time, was the deciding vote and voted against having slavery legal, even though he had been pro-slavery many times. This angered the pro-slavery side as they already saw the current governor, Andrew Cole's (who was anti-slavery) proposals as a threat. The night it was decided, pro-slavery people of all ages and sizes protested, and it later turned violent. The pro-slavery side even burned a statue of Nicolas Hansen and tried to remove him from office forcibly. These events caused a divide between the pro and anti-slavery sides, and writers took to the papers to share their opinions as Illinois voters were also divided. The pro-slavery side argued that they had the people’s support and benefits like media influence and economic wealth. The anti-slavery side opposed slavery socially, economically, and morally. Morris Birbeck, an anti-slavery writer, argued that introducing slavery was driven by pure self-interest, basically arguing that introducing slavery only benefited the masters while not thinking of the greater good. Veritas, a pro-slavery writer, argued that the anti-slavery side never explained their reasoning. This slavery divide caused Illinois residents to expect the papers/press to appear to the Republican principle.^{[18]} The constitution also had a time limited exception to 1825, in which the Illinois Salines (salt works) could continue the use of slave labor, as it had for decades under prior governments, provided the slaves used were only imported temporarily from outside the state (primarily from nearby Kentucky).

Slavecatchers from Missouri would travel to Illinois either to recapture escaped slaves, or kidnap free blacks for sale into slavery, particularly since Illinois' legislature tightened the Black Code to state that recaptured escaped slaves would have time added to their indentures. The following year a law barred blacks from being witnesses in court cases against whites, then two years later barred blacks from suing for their freedom. In Phoebe v Jay, Judge Samuel D. Lockwood, previously Coles' anti-convention and abolitionist ally, held that the 40-year indenture of Phoebe (entered into in 1814) could be transferred to Joseph Jay's heir, his son William Jay, arguing that the new state's Constitution superseded the anti-slavery provisions of the Northwest Ordinance.

Despite these laws tolerating de facto slavery, in a series of decisions beginning with Cornelius v. Cohen in 1825, the Illinois Supreme Court developed a jurisprudence to gradually emancipate the enslaved people of Illinois. In that first case, the justices decided that in order for a contract of servitude to be valid, both parties must agree to it and sign it. In Choisser v. Hargrave, the court decided that indentures would not be enforced unless they complied with all provisions of Illinois law, including that they be registered within 30 days of entering the state. In 1836, the court in Boon v. Juliet held that children of registered slaves brought into the state were free and could themselves be indentured only until the age of 18 or 21 years (depending on their sex) according to the state's constitution. In Sarah v. Borders (1843), the court held that, if any fraud occurred in the signing of an indenture contract, the contract was void. Finally, in the 1845 decision, Jarrot v. Jarrot, the court ended tolerance of slavery even for descendants of former French slaves, holding that descendants of slaves born after the 1787 Northwest Ordinance were born free.

In one of the predecessors of the Dred Scott decision, Moore v. People, 55 U.S. 13 (1852), the Supreme Court of the United States upheld a conviction for harboring a fugitive slave from Missouri, as had the Illinois Supreme Court a few years earlier. Illinois residents participated in the Underground Railroad for fugitive slaves seeking freedom, with major routes beginning in the Mississippi River towns of Chester, Alton and Quincy, to Chicago, and lesser routes from Cairo to Springfield, Illinois or up the banks of the Wabash River.

The Illinois' Constitution of 1848 banned slavery, section 16 of its Declaration of Rights specifying, "There shall be neither slavery nor involuntary servitude in the State, except as a punishment for crime whereof the party shall have been duly convicted." Subsequent legislation, however, led to one of the most restrictive Black Code systems in the nation until the American Civil War. The Illinois Black Code of 1853 (officially, "An Act to Prevent the Immigration of Free Negros into this State") prohibited any Black persons from outside of the state from staying in the state for more than ten days, subjecting Black emigrants who remain beyond the ten days to arrest, detention, a $50 (~$1,935 in 2025) fine, potential debt labor for those who could not pay, or deportation. The law led to increased political organizing within Illinois's black community, with the holding of the first statewide "Colored Convention" in October 1853 to protest the law. The Black Code was repealed in early 1865, the same year that the Civil War ended. At that time, Illinois also became the first state to ratify the Thirteenth Amendment to the United States Constitution, which abolished slavery nationally.

== See also ==
- Frontier Illinois
- Illinois in the American Civil War
- Slavery in the United States
