= Matson Trial =

1847 US trial involving Abraham Lincoln

The Matson Trial (1847), officially Matson v. Ashmore et al. for the use of Bryant, was a freedom suit by former slave Anthony Bryant on behalf of his family in Coles County, Illinois. It is noted for the unusual circumstance where Abraham Lincoln, the future emancipator of slaves, defended a slave-owner against a slave. The case pitted Lincoln and former Illinois Attorney General Usher F. Linder against former US Representative Orlando B. Ficklin. Ficklin's representation proved successful, and Bryant's family was emancipated based on free soil doctrine. A free soil doctrine, Lincoln had in an earlier case used successfully to gain freedom for a purported slave (Bailey v. Cromwell (1841)), so Lincoln was here constrained to argue that the 'transit exception' to the free soil doctrine applied. The court found that the transit exception (temporary presence on free soil) was not supported by the facts of Bryant's case, so Bryant was free.

== Background ==
Kentucky native Robert Matson purchased land in Coles County, Illinois in 1836. Matson skirted the state laws that banned slavery by bringing slaves for only a year, returning them to Kentucky, and then replacing them with new slaves. Matson emancipated one of his slaves, Anthony Bryant, who acted as his foreman. Bryant's family joined him in Coles County in 1845. Two years later, there was an altercation between Bryant's wife, Jane, and one of Matson's white housekeepers. After the housekeeper threatened Bryant's family, Matson sent one of Bryant's children back to Kentucky.

Concerned about his family, Bryant and his family sought refuge with two local abolitionists, Hiram Rutherford and Gideon Ashmore. Since the rest of his family was still enslaved, this violated state fugitive slave laws. Matson sought to recover the family and enlisted the help of former Illinois Attorney General Usher F. Linder. Linder had recently joined the Whig Party, where he befriended fellow lawyer Abraham Lincoln. Like Lincoln, Linder opposed slavery. He was able to convince a local justice of the peace to imprison the Bryant family in the fall.

== Trial ==
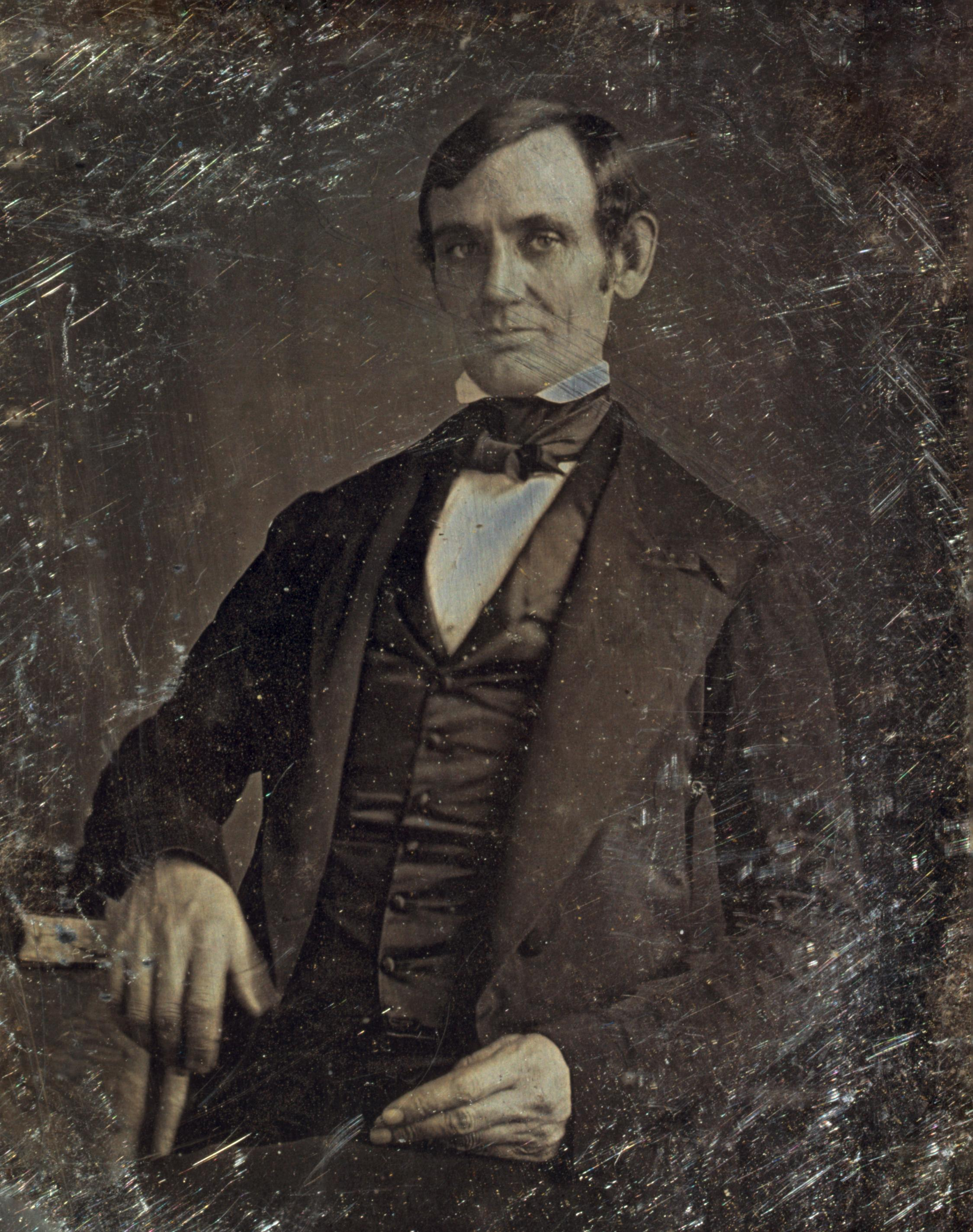
Abraham Lincoln c. 1846, around the time of the trial

The ensuing court case, in re Bryant, opened in October 1847. Ashmore and Rutherford requested the legal assistance of Lincoln, but found that Lincoln had already agreed to work with Linder to defend Matson. After learning about the request, Linder gave Lincoln permission to instead represent the abolitionists, but Rutherford refused. The abolitionists, on behalf of Bryant, instead enlisted the help of former US Representative Orlando B. Ficklin against Linder and Lincoln. Lincoln had previously won a freedom suit (Bailey v. Cromwell (1841)) on behalf of an alleged slave, Nance, and her children, successfully getting the Illinois Supreme Court to declare, "the presumption [is] ... every person was free, without regard to race ... the sale of a free person is illegal."

During the Matson proceedings, Lincoln conceded that slaves were free, when brought to settle permanently in Illinois but argued that Matson intended to house the Bryants temporarily and thus they were covered by an exception for slaves in transit. He also provided evidence supporting the character of Matson. Ficklin defended the Bryants by arguing that any man in a free state becomes free. The Coles County judge sided with Ficklin noting that the Bryants' two-year tenure in Illinois exceeded any possible transit exception, and the case ended with the Bryants' freedom.

=== Aftermath ===
Matson left Illinois, refusing to pay his lawyers. The Bryants later resettled in Liberia. Similar arguments to Lincoln's were used by Chief Justice Roger B. Taney in the Dred Scott v. Sandford decision. The case remains a controversial event in the development of Lincoln's views on slavery.

Lincoln may have taken the case because of recent financial troubles. He may also have defended Matson knowing that he could not win, or perhaps because he did believe that Matson's legal rights were being violated. Michael Burlingame writes, "Lincoln's agreement to represent Matson has been called 'one of the greatest enigmas of his career.'" He speculates that Lincoln may have believed that a lawyer "who refuses his professional assistance because in his judgment the case is unjust and indefensible, usurps the functions of both judge and jury." Burlingame continues, "In 1844, the eminent jurist David Dudley Field observed that in the United States it was assumed that 'a lawyer is not at liberty to refuse any one his services.'"

== See also ==
- History of slavery in Illinois
