= Old Southwest =

Historic region of the United States

The "Old Southwest" is an informal name for the southwestern frontier territories of the United States from the American Revolutionary War c. 1780, through the early 1800s, at which point the US had acquired the Louisiana Territory, pushing the southwestern frontier toward what is today known as the Southwest.

After numerous wars and an ethnic cleansing campaign, this region was eventually divided among six states that joined the union as Kentucky, Tennessee, Mississippi, Alabama, West Virginia and Florida. The portions of Georgia furthest from South Carolina and the Atlantic are usually considered part of this region. Conversely, the Florida peninsula (i.e. not including the Florida Panhandle) and the Appalachian portions of Tennessee and Kentucky are not always considered part of this region.

== Geography ==
Historians usually describe the Old Southwest as bounded by the Mississippi River to the west, the Ohio, its tributary, to the north, the body of water these rivers flow into—the Gulf of Mexico—to the south, and to the east, the western boundaries of Virginia, North Carolina, and Georgia. Much of northern, western, and southern Georgia is part of the Old Southwest, as the state did not grow into its modern boundaries until 1827.

Historians usually include West Florida in the Old Southwest, but the peninsula of Florida, or East Florida, is often excluded. The Apalachicola River was the boundary between West Florida and East Florida until 1820. The Florida Parishes of Louisiana, lying east of the Mississippi, are part of the Old Southwest.

== History ==
The Old Southwest includes the homelands of numerous American Indian nations, including the five so-called "Five Civilized Tribes," the Cherokee, Chickasaw, Choctaw, Creek, Seminole as well as the Shawnee. The European empires of Spain, France, and Great Britain competed with one another for monopolies on resource extraction and the allegiance of Native leaders in this region. In 1763, following the French and Indian War, France made peace with Great Britain and surrendered all its territorial claims east of the Mississippi River. That same year, the Royal Proclamation of 1763 set the western border of the American colonies at the Appalachian mountains, but many settlers defied the order and occupied parts of the territory.

After the American Revolutionary War, in the Treaty of Paris of 1783, Britain ceded most of its North American territory to the United States, while Spain, a U.S. ally, took over in West and East Florida. In 1787 the United States Congress organized the Northwest Territory and established rules for founding new states, but the Old Southwest proved more difficult to manage. As was the case with the Northwest Territory, the states to the east each claimed overlapping territory extending to the Mississippi River.

Settler colonialists in Virginia's western territory separated in 1790 and entered the union as the Commonwealth of Kentucky in 1792. Settlers in portions of North Carolina's western claims briefly attempted to organize as the state of Franklin in the 1780s. In 1790, all of North Carolina west of the Appalachians was organized as the Southwest Territory, and in 1796 this territory joined the union as the state of Tennessee. In the same decade, Georgia politicians conspired to sell off western land in the Yazoo land scandal. After this, the state relinquished its western claims to the federal government in 1802, in exchange for a promise to acquire all property belonging to Indians in Georgia. The federal government organized this acquisition as the Mississippi Territory, which was eventually divided and joined the union as Mississippi in 1817 and Alabama in 1819.

The Spanish province of West Florida extended along the Gulf Coast from the Mississippi River to the Apalachicola River. American incursions between 1811 and 1818 gradually absorbed most of West Florida. American troops annexed the port of Mobile in 1813, then occupied Pensacola. In 1819 Spain ceded all its Florida land to the United States.

Despite the Proclamation of 1763 prohibiting Anglo-American settlement in this region until the Treaty of Paris in 1783, by the 1790 census there were over 100,000 American settler-colonists in Kentucky and Tennessee alone, and by the 1800 census there were about 400,000 Americans in this region (including enslaved people). Members of Indigenous Nations were not US citizens until the Indian Citizenship Act of 1924 and thus were not counted in the census. The US waged several wars of extermination against the Indigenous people of this region, including the Cherokee wars, the Creek War, and the Seminole Wars. Following the Indian Removal Act of 1830, the American Indian Nations of this region were all but annihilated, surviving mainly in isolated rural pockets of land that were often unsuitable for agriculture and thus of little value to American settler-colonists. The only federally recognized American Indian groups in this region in the 21st century are the Mississippi Choctaw, the Poarch Band Creek in Alabama, and the Seminoles and Miccosukee in Florida. Their combined population was approximately 18,000 in 2020—over 11,000 of which were Mississippi Choctaw.

Following the 1803 Louisiana Purchase, this region and the Old South gradually came to be collectively known as the Southeast, although the northeast portion of the Old South is sometimes instead considered part of the US Atlantic Midland. By the late 1840s, following the Mexican–American War, the term American Southwest referred mainly to the southern portion of the Mexican Cession.

== Economy ==
The economy of the Old Southwest was predicated on the labor of enslaved Black Americans. The region's climate and soils favored commodity agriculture over industrial development, and after the invention of the cotton gin, exporting cotton grown on plantations worked by enslaved people became particularly lucrative. The 1803 Louisiana Purchase provided the fledgling United States with an enormous territory connected by the Mississippi and its tributaries, as well as a large seaport—New Orleans—that would facilitate global trade. By the 1840s, the Old Southwest states of Alabama and Mississippi had become wealthy by using slave labor and land acquired via ethnic cleansing to grow and export cotton.

== See also ==
- Indian barrier state
- Indian removal
- Indian Reserve (1763)
- Kentucke's Frontiers by Craig Thompson Friend
- Overmountain Men
- Royal Proclamation of 1763
- Southwest Territory
