= Trans-Appalachia =

Area in United States west of the Appalachian mountains

Trans-Appalachia is an area in the United States bounded to the east by the Appalachian Mountains and extending west roughly to the Mississippi River. It spans from the Midwest to the Upper South. The term is used most frequently when referring to the area as a frontier in the 17th, 18th and 19th century. During this period, the region gained its own identity, defined by its isolation and separation from the rest of the United States to the east. It included much of Ohio Country and at least the northern and eastern parts of the Old Southwest. It was never an organized territory or other political unit. Most of what was referred to by this name became the states of western Pennsylvania, Ohio, West Virginia, Kentucky, Tennessee and western Virginia. It is still a vague and little used place name today.

Trans-Appalachia can be divided into four sub regions: 1) the Old Northwest Territory that encompasses the current states of Ohio, Indiana, Illinois, Michigan, Wisconsin and Minnesota, 2) the Old Southwest Territory represented by the present states of Kentucky, Tennessee, Alabama, Mississippi, 3) Florida, and 4) the territory of upstate New York and southeast Canada.

A similar name, trans-Allegheny, has much the same usage (usually as an adjective) and refers to the Allegheny Mountains, the northern portion of the Appalachians.

== History ==
Beginning in the 18th century, as open land east of the Appalachian Mountains became increasingly scarce, the region started to receive significant numbers of migrants. The Appalachian mountains were bypassed for Trans-Appalachia's better farmland and access to waterways.

Much of 18th century Trans-Appalachia, especially the Ohio River Valley, was defined by conflict over territory between the British, French, and Native Americans. Although the Proclamation of 1763 after the Seven Years War prohibited further settlement, significant migration to the region continued throughout the 1760s and 1770s. This caused further conflict with Native Americans, such as Pontiac's War from 1763 to 1764. After the Revolutionary War, America formally acquired the land of Trans-Appalachia through peace treaties. This spurred a new wave of migration that would catapult the region to increasing prominence.

== Migration ==
=== First Anglo-American Migrants ===
Starting in the mid-18th century, Americans who wanted to find a better life in the wilderness traveled several main roads over the Appalachians. Those from New England followed the Mohawk Trail into western New York. The travelers from Philadelphia took Forbes' Road to Pittsburgh, where they could travel west on the Ohio River. From Baltimore, they went to Pittsburgh on Braddock's Road. Middle Atlantic settlers used Cumberland Road (the National Road). Southerners used either the Great Valley Road or the Richmond Road through the mountains to the Cumberland Gap. From there they could take the Wilderness Road northward into present day Kentucky and the Ohio Valley. Daniel Boone was hired by the Transylvania Company to cut the Wilderness Road.

=== Increasing trans-Appalachian populations ===
Between 1790 and 1810, around 98,000 slaves, along with their owners, moved west into the region south of the Ohio River (the Northwest Ordinance of 1787 had forbidden slavery in states north of the Ohio).

- By 1795, in Kentucky, 75,000
- By 1830, hundreds of thousands of settlers were in the region, which at that time consisted of Michigan Territory, and the new states of
  - Ohio, with 1,000,000 inhabitants,
  - Indiana, with almost 350,000 inhabitants, and
  - Illinois, with more than 150,000 inhabitants.

== See also ==
- Trans-Mississippi, everything west of the Mississippi River, i.e. west of trans-Appalachia
- State of Franklin
- Illinois County, Virginia
- Kentucke's Frontiers by Craig Thompson Friend
- Kentucky County, Virginia
- Northwest Territory
- Ohio Country
- Overhill Cherokee
- Overmountain Men
- Southwest Territory
- Tennessee County, North Carolina
- Transylvania Colony
- Vandalia (colony)
- Washington County, North Carolina
- Watauga Association
- Wilderness Road
