= Fair-Rutherford and Rutherford Houses =

Historic houses in South Carolina, United States

- U.S. National Register of Historic Places
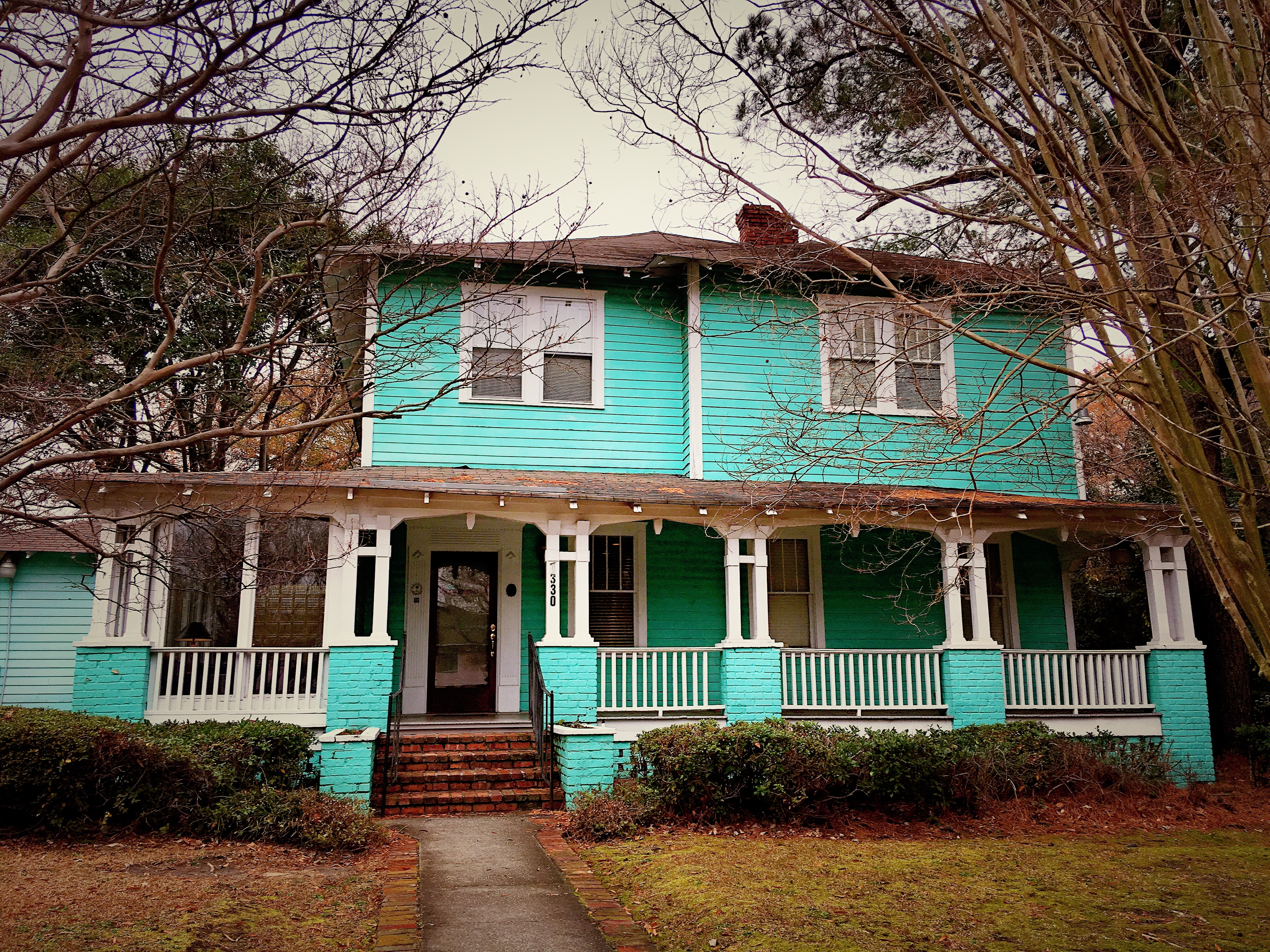

- Location within South Carolina Location within the United States
- Location: 1326 and 1330 Gregg St., Columbia, South Carolina
- Coordinates: 34°0′25″N 81°1′24″W
- Area: 0.3 acres (0.12 ha)
- Built: c. 1850, 1924-1925
- NRHP reference No.: 84002093
- Added to NRHP: April 5, 1984

Fair-Rutherford and Rutherford Houses, refers to a set of two historic homes located at Columbia, South Carolina. The Fair-Rutherford House was built about 1850, and underwent three alterations during the following century (c. 1879, c. 1905, and c. 1950). It was demolished in 2004. The two-story Rutherford House was built in 1924–25. They are associated with they prominent African American Rutherford family of Columbia. The Rutherford House presently serves as an office for Palmetto Dental Services. It was added to the National Register of Historic Places in 1984.
