= Illinois County, Virginia =

Region of Virginia from 1778 to 1787

Coordinates: 39°N 89°W

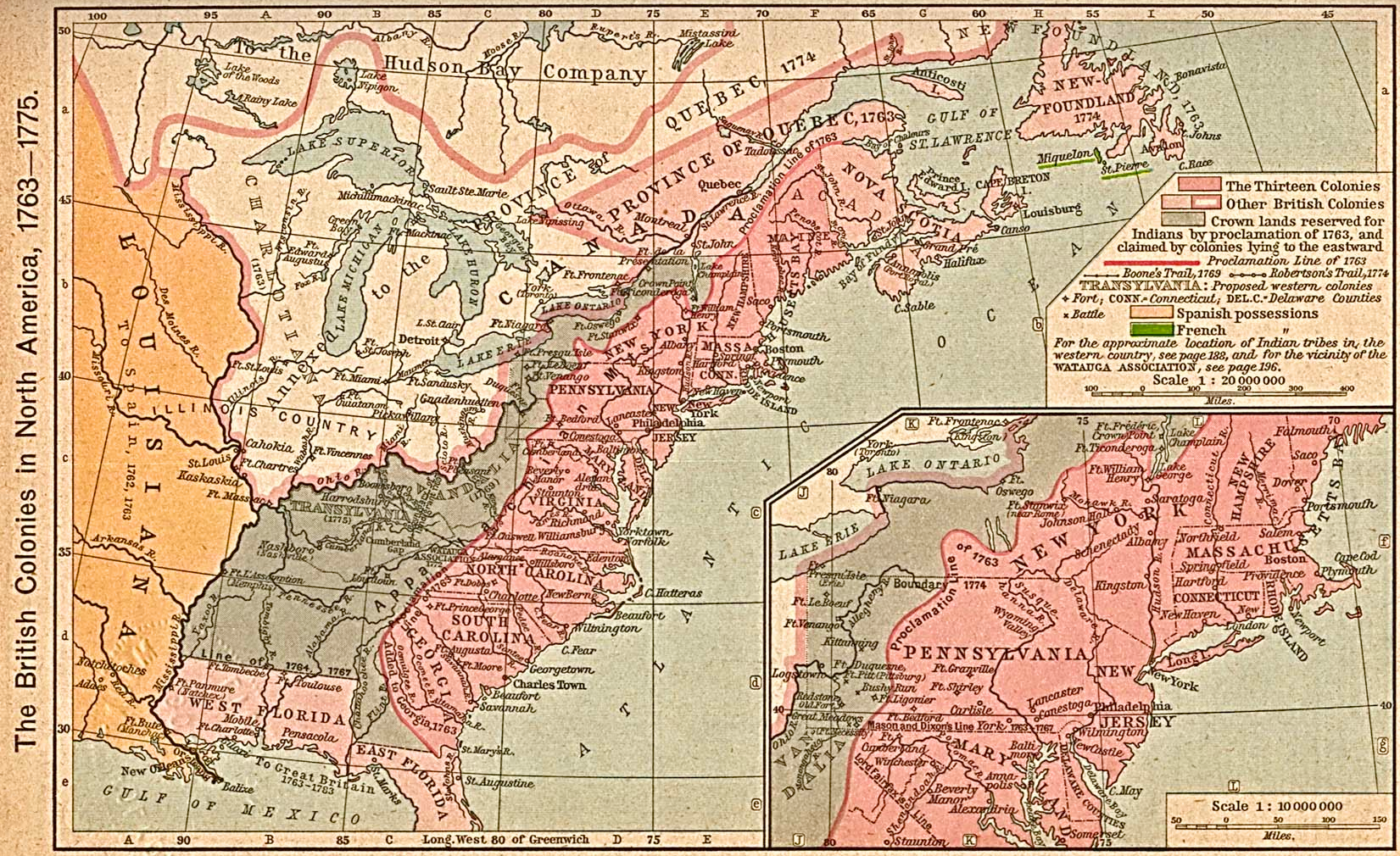
The large area claimed by Clark and Virginia arising from the Illinois Campaign is part of British America's Province of Quebec below the Great Lakes, and outlined in pink under the British Parliament's Quebec Act. The old French Illinois Country is center left.

Illinois County, Virginia, was a political and geographic region, part of the British Province of Quebec, claimed during the American Revolutionary War on July 4, 1778, by George Rogers Clark of the Virginia Militia as a result of the Illinois Campaign. Though part or all of the area was also claimed by Connecticut and Massachusetts, it was formally organized by the Commonwealth of Virginia later that year. The County was accorded official governmental existence, including legally defined boundaries and a formal governmental structure under the laws of the Commonwealth. The county seat was the old Illinois Country French village of Kaskaskia. John Todd was appointed by Governor Patrick Henry to head the county's government. The county was abolished in January 1782, and Virginia ceded the land to the new United States Confederation government in 1784. The area later became the Northwest Territory by an Act of Congress in 1787.

Geographically, the county was bordered to the southeast by the Ohio River, in the west by the Mississippi River, and in the north by the Great Lakes at the time of its existence. It included all of what were known as eastern Illinois Country under French sovereignty and Ohio Country. Politically, its effective reach extended only to the old French settlements of Vincennes, Cahokia, and Kaskaskia.

== See also ==
- Former counties, cities, and towns of Virginia
