= Kentucke's Frontiers =

2010 book about the history of the Trans-Appalachian Frontier in Kentucky

- Author: Craig Thompson Friend
- Language: English
- Subject: Early American history
- Genre: Non-fiction, history
- Publisher: Indiana University Press
- Publication date: 2010
- Pages: 400
- ISBN: 978-0253355195
- Website: IUP Page

Kentucke's Frontiers is a book by Craig Thompson Friend published in 2010 by Indiana University Press. Starting from the 1720s to the conclusion of the War of 1812, Kentucke's Frontiers explores the political, military, and social history of the Kentucky frontier and how these came together to shape the public memory of frontier Kentucky.

The work is part of the A History of the Trans-Appalachian Frontier series edited by Malcolm J. Rohrbough.

== Structure ==
The work contains normal front material, including a foreword by Walter Nugent and Malcolm J. Rohrbough, followed by a preface by the author and eight chapters:

1. The Indians' Frontiers
2. Colonial Kentucke
3. Revolutions
4. Peopling Kentucke
5. Seeking Security and Stability
6. From Kentucke to Kentucky
7. An Old South Frontier
8. Remembering

The work concludes with an epilogue and an Essays on Sources.

== Academic journal reviews ==
- Barksdale, Kevin T. (2011). "Reviewed work: Kentucke's Frontiers, Craig Thompson Friend". The Journal of American History. 98 (2): 503–504. doi:10.1093/jahist/jar194. JSTOR 41509979.
- Campney, Brent M. S. (2013). "Reviewed work: KENTUCke's FRONTIERS, Craig Thompson Friend". American Studies. 52 (2): 150–151. doi:10.1353/ams.2013.0053. JSTOR 41809754. S2CID 143583816.
- Fitzpatrick, Benjamin (2011). "Reviewed work: Kentucke's Frontiers, Craig Thompson Friend". Journal of the Early Republic. 31 (3): 515–517. doi:10.1353/jer.2011.0042. JSTOR 41261638. S2CID 144882270.
- Gruenwald, Kim M. (2012). "Reviewed work: Kentucke's Frontiers. A History of the Trans-Appalachian Frontier, Craig Thompson Friend". The Journal of Southern History. 78 (2): 432–433. JSTOR 23248063.
- O'Malley, Nancy (2012). "Reviewed work: Kentucke's Frontiers, Craig Thompson Friend". The American Historical Review. 117 (1): 192. doi:10.1086/ahr.117.1.192. JSTOR 23309928.
- Salafia, Matthew (2012). "Here Comes the Fear—Again". Reviews in American History. 40 (1): 73–82. doi:10.1353/rah.2012.0008. JSTOR 41348949. S2CID 144091621.
- Smith, John David (2011). "Reviewed work: Kentucke's Frontiers, Craig Thompson Friend". The North Carolina Historical Review. 88 (4): 436–437. JSTOR 23523605.
- Stearns, Susan Gaunt (2012). "Reviewed work: Kentucke's Frontiers, Craig T. Friend". Tennessee Historical Quarterly. 71 (1): 75–76. JSTOR 42628240.

== About the author ==
Craig Thompson Friend is the author of numerous works on Kentucky and southern United States history. In addition to Kentucke’s Frontiers, they are the author of Along the Maysville Road: The Early Republic in the Trans-Appalachian West, and coauthor of the second edition of A New History of Kentucky. He is a professor of history at North Carolina State University.

== Similar or related works ==
- The Trans-Appalachian Frontier: People, Societies, and Institutions, 1775-1850 by Malcolm J. Rohrbough
- Along the Maysville Road: The Early Republic in the Trans-Appalachian West
- A New History of Kentucky
- Tennessee Frontiers: Three Regions in Transition

== See also ==
- History of Kentucky
- Kentucky County, Virginia
- Trans-Appalachia
