= Indian Reserve (1763) =

Brtish North American territory

Coordinates: 38°N 85°W

- Territory of British America
- 1763–1783
- Flag

- Indian Reserve west of Alleghenies in 1775, after Quebec was extended to the Ohio River. Map does not reflect border as most recently adjusted by Treaty of Camp Charlotte (1774) and Henderson Purchase (1775) that opened West Virginia, most of Kentucky, and parts of Tennessee to white settlement.
- History
  - Royal Proclamation: 7 October 1763
  - Treaty of Fort Stanwix: 5 November 1768
  - Vandalia (colony): 27 December 1769
  - Quebec Act: 22 June 1774
  - Transylvania (colony): 14 March 1775
  - Treaty of Paris: 3 September 1783
Preceded by	Succeeded by
Illinois Country	United States
- Today part of: Canada; United States

"Indian Reserve" is a historical term for the largely uncolonized land in North America that was claimed by France, ceded to Great Britain through the Treaty of Paris (1763) at the end of the Seven Years' War—also known as the French and Indian War—and set aside for the First Nations in the Royal Proclamation of 1763. The British government had contemplated establishing an Indian barrier state in a portion of the reserve west of the Appalachian Mountains, bounded by the Ohio and Mississippi rivers and the Great Lakes. British officials aspired to establish such a state even after the region was assigned to the United States in the Treaty of Paris (1783) ending the American Revolutionary War, but abandoned their efforts in 1814 after losing military control of the region during the War of 1812.

In the modern United States, it consisted of all the territory north of Florida and New Orleans that was east of the Mississippi River and west of the Eastern Continental Divide in the Appalachian Mountains, and that formerly comprised the eastern half of Louisiana (New France). In modern Canada, it consisted of all the land immediately north of the Great Lakes and south of Rupert's Land of the Hudson's Bay Company, and also a buffer between the Province of Quebec and Rupert's Land stretching from Lake Nipissing to Newfoundland.

The Royal Proclamation of 1763 organized much of the new territorial cessions in North America to Britain into three colonies: East Florida, West Florida, and Quebec. The remainder of the new British territory was left to Native Americans. The delineation of the Eastern Divide, following the Allegheny Ridge of the Appalachians, confirmed the limit to British settlement established by the Treaty of Easton of 1758, before Pontiac's War. Additionally, all European settlers in the territory, who were mostly French, were supposed to quit the territory or obtain official permission to remain. Many of the settlers moved to New Orleans and the French land on the west side of the Mississippi, especially St. Louis, which in turn had been ceded secretly to Spain to become Louisiana (New Spain). However, many of the settlers remained and the British did not actively attempt to evict them.

In 1768, lands west of the Alleghenies and south of the Ohio River were ceded to the colonies by the Cherokee with the Treaty of Hard Labour and by the Haudenosaunee Confederacy with the Treaty of Fort Stanwix. However, several other aboriginal nations, especially the Shawnee and Mingo, continued to inhabit and claim their lands that other tribes had sold to the British. This conflict caused Dunmore's War in 1774, which was ended by the Treaty of Camp Charlotte, in which these nations agreed to accept the Ohio River as the new boundary.

Restrictions on settlement were to become a flash point in the American Revolutionary War, following the Henderson Purchase of much of Kentucky from the Cherokee in 1775. The renegade Cherokee chief Dragging Canoe did not agree to the sale, nor did the British government in London, which forbade settlement in the region. As an act of revolution in defiance of the British Crown, white pioneer settlers began pouring into Kentucky in 1776, opposed by Dragging Canoe in the Cherokee–American Wars, which continued until 1794.

== Timeline ==
=== Early settlements ===
- 1675 – Jacques Marquette founded a mission post at Grand Village of the Illinois, near modern Utica, Illinois
- 1680 – Iroquois massacred Grand Village
- 1680 – Fort Crevecoeur was established at Peoria, Illinois
- 1696 – Cahokia, Illinois founded
- 1703 – Kaskaskia, Illinois founded
- 1717 – Illinois Country generally transferred from the jurisdiction of French Canada to French Louisiana
- 1720 – Fort de Chartres established on the Mississippi River near Prairie du Rocher, Illinois
- 1753 – Fort Presque Isle erected near Erie, Pennsylvania
- 1754 – Fort Duquesne founded at Pittsburgh, Pennsylvania

=== French and Indian War ===
- 1754 – A French unit under Joseph Coulon de Jumonville had a letter for George Washington to leave French territory at Uniontown, Pennsylvania. Washington's militia ambushed the French unit, and one account related that Jumonville was killed by Seneca nation chief Tanacharison while in custody of Washington, igniting the French and Indian War.
- 1754 – Washington surrendered to Jumonville's half-brother Louis Coulon de Villiers in the Battle of the Great Meadows in Fayette County, Pennsylvania. It was the only time Washington ever surrendered in battle. He signed a document taking responsibility for the assassination of Jumonville and was released. The document was used to widen the war into the global Seven Years' War.
- 1762 – Following massive French defeats, the French secretly ceded Louisiana on the west side of the Mississippi River to its ally Spain in the Treaty of Fontainebleau (1762).
- 1763 – France ceded all lands in modern Canada and all lands east of the Mississippi in the Treaty of Paris (1763). Terms required religious tolerance in Quebec and unrestricted emigration from French Canada for 18 months.
- 1763 – King George III issued the Royal Proclamation instituting the Indian Reserve, ordering all settlers to leave the Reserve, and declaring that the Crown, rather than individual colonies, had the right to negotiate settlement in the Reserve.

=== Effort to settle the Reserve ===
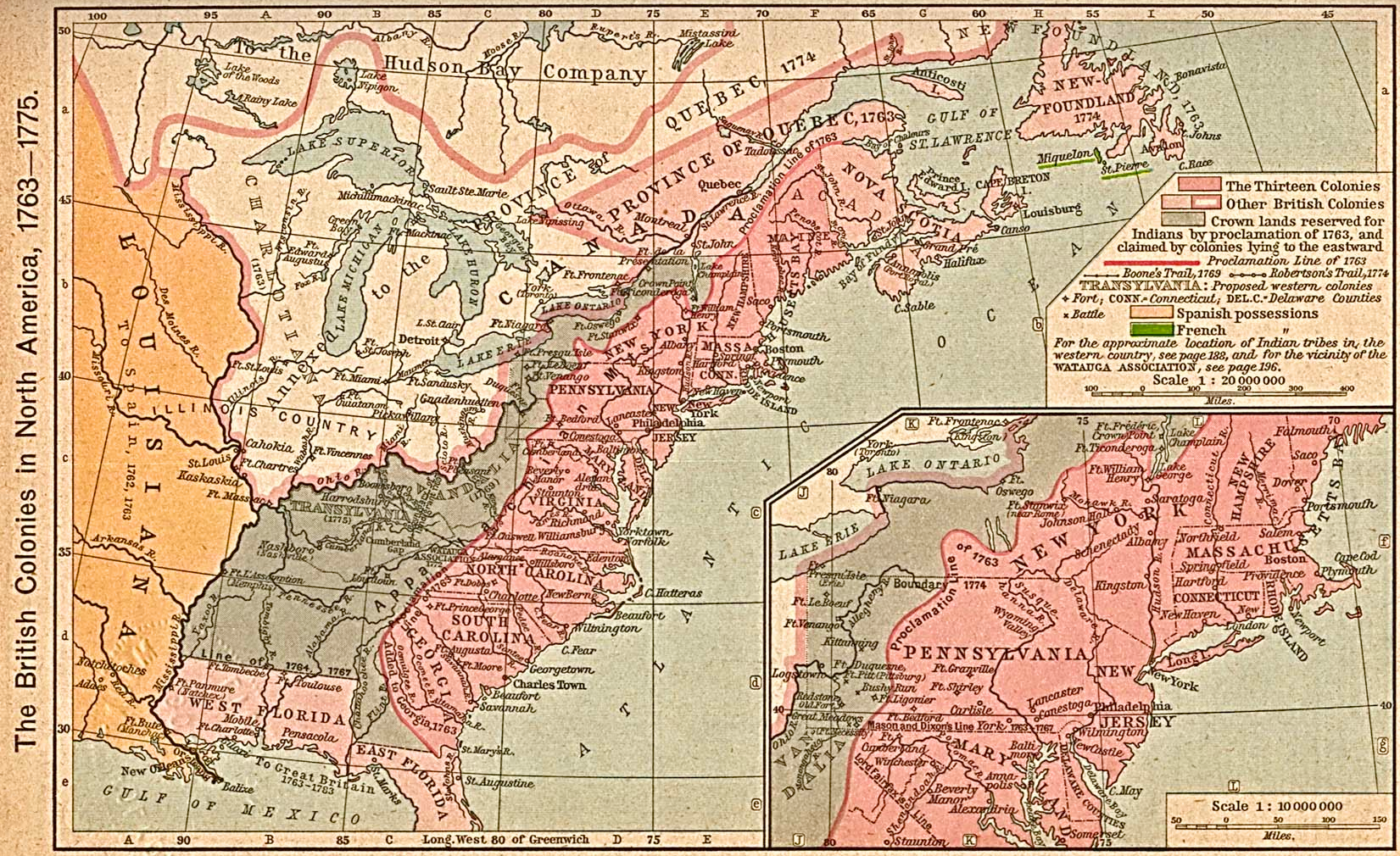
The British colonies in North America from 1763 to 1775, at the outbreak of the American Revolutionary War, including the locations of the proposed colonies of Charlotiana, Transylvania, and Vandalia

- 1764 – It was announced that Spain had acquired the west bank of the Mississippi River in Louisiana (New Spain).
- 1768 – Treaty of Fort Stanwix creates the Line of Property and Purchase Line in which the Iroquois cede much of Kentucky, West Virginia, and sections of western Pennsylvania and New York.
- 1772 – The Grand Ohio Company gets charter to settle the Vandalia colony south of the Ohio River much of which is now West Virginia.
- 1774 – Quebec Act expands the borders of the Province of Quebec to take all the Indian land in Canada in the buffer with Rupert's Land as well as all the land in territory north of the Ohio River including Illinois, Indiana, Michigan, Ohio, Wisconsin and a section of Minnesota. The act is considered one of the Intolerable Acts that contributed to the American Revolutionary War.
- 1775 – Transylvania (colony) founded in what is now Kentucky by Richard Henderson. Daniel Boone blazes Wilderness Trail through Cumberland Gap and founds Boonesborough.
- 1775 – Most of the Thirteen Colonies lay formal claim to the land extending the borders in straight lines west to the Mississippi.

=== American Revolutionary War ===
- 1778 – Larger conflicts in the Western theater of the American Revolutionary War begin with the Siege of Boonesborough in which Daniel Boone is initially captured and "adopted" by the Shawnee but eventually escapes to lead a successful American defense of Boonesborough.
- 1779 – American victories in the Illinois Campaign, Fort Laurens, Battle of Saint Louis (only battle west of the Mississippi in Spanish-held Louisiana).
- 1780 – British reassert control over the territory in Bird's invasion of Kentucky.
- 1781 – British victories in Lochry's Defeat and Long Run Massacre.
- 1781 – Spain completes rout of Britain in Florida in the Battle of Pensacola (1781).
- 1782 – British victory in the Battle of Blue Licks: ten months after Charles Cornwallis, 1st Marquess Cornwallis surrender in Siege of Yorktown.
- 1782 – American victory in the Ohio Valley at the Siege of Fort Henry; denying Britain control of the region.
- 1783 – Treaty of Paris (1783) ends the war and the British cede the territory south of modern-day Canada to the United States and Florida to Spain.
- 1795 – Boundaries between British North America and the United States are defined in the Jay Treaty, ending British occupation south of the Great Lakes following hostilities in the Northwest Indian War.

== Dissolution ==
The area of the Indian Reserve in what is now the United States, after coming under firm control of the new country, was gradually settled by European Americans, and divided into territories and states, starting with the Northwest Territory. Most (but not all) Indians in the area of the former Reserve were relocated further west under policies of Indian Removal. After the Louisiana Purchase, the Indian Intercourse Act of 1834 created an Indian Territory west of the Mississippi River as a destination, until it too was divided into territories and states for European American settlement, leaving only modern Indian Reservations inside the boundaries of U.S. states.

== See also ==
- Indian barrier state
- Northwest Territory
- Old Southwest
- Southwest Territory
- Section Twenty-five of the Canadian Charter of Rights and Freedoms, which mentions the 1763 Royal Proclamation
- Aboriginal title statutes in the Thirteen Colonies
- Ohio Country
- Overhill Cherokee
- Overmountain Men
- Trans-Appalachia
- Wilderness Road
