= Transylvania Colony =

Short-lived extra-legal colony in frontier Kentucky

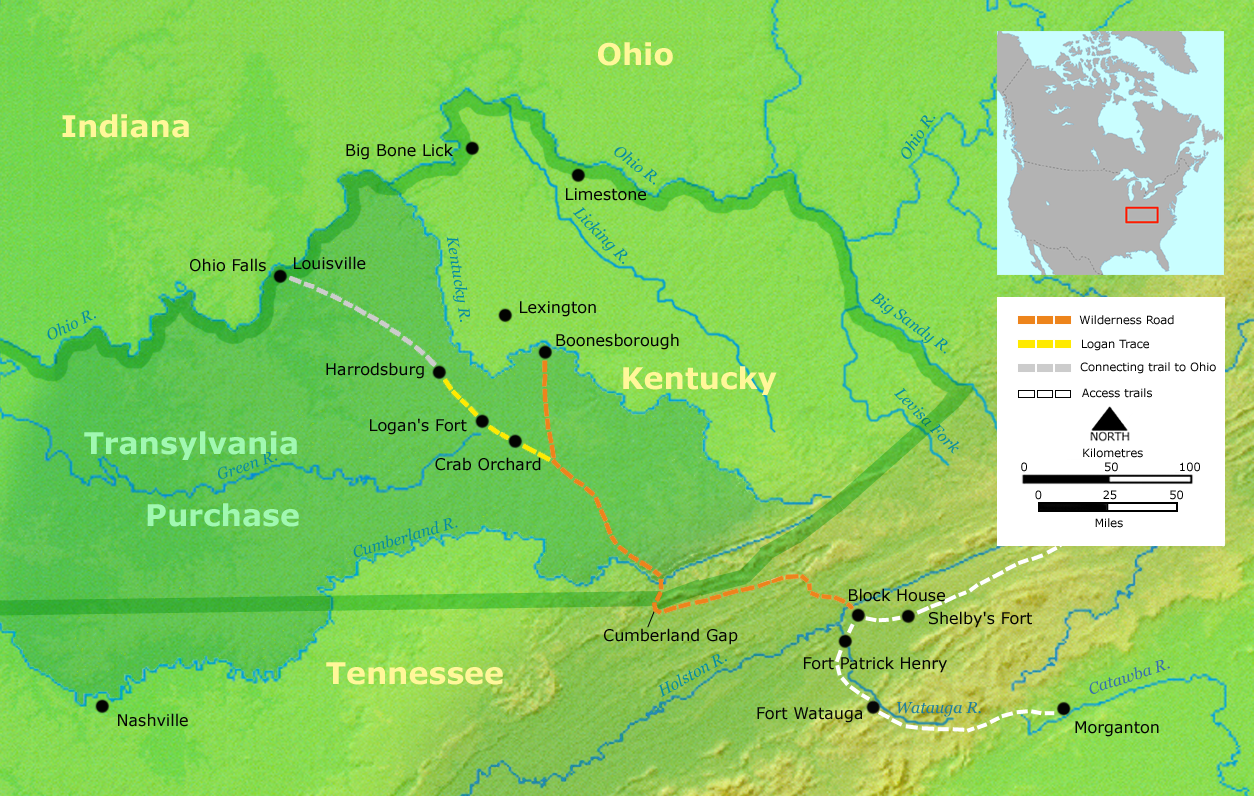
The Transylvania Purchase and the Wilderness Road corridor from Sycamore Shoals

The Transylvania Colony, also referred to as the Transylvania Purchase or the Henderson Purchase, was a short-lived, extra-legal colony founded in early 1775 by North Carolina land speculator Richard Henderson, who formed and controlled the Transylvania Company. Henderson and his investors had reached an agreement to purchase a vast tract of Cherokee lands west of the southern and central Appalachian Mountains through the acceptance of the Treaty of Sycamore Shoals with most leading Cherokee chieftains then controlling these lands. In exchange for the land the tribes received goods worth, according to the estimates of some scholars, about 10,000 British pounds (just over $2 million U.S. in 2026). To further complicate matters, this frontier land was also claimed by the Virginia Colony (particularly following Lord Dunmore's War) and a southern portion by Province of North Carolina.

The Transylvania Colony was located in what is now the central and western parts of Kentucky, and a chunk of north central Tennessee. The American pioneer and frontier explorer Daniel Boone was hired by Henderson to establish the Wilderness Road going through the Cumberland Gap and into southeastern Kentucky to facilitate settlement. A governmental compact was concluded by the settlers in May 1775. Most settlement was forestalled by the Revolutionary War, except around established towns. Henderson's Transylvania claim in Kentucky was invalidated by the Virginia General Assembly in 1778, and the remaining Tennessee portion was invalidated by North Carolina in 1783. Henderson was compensated with a land grant along the Ohio River in western Kentucky and the current town of Henderson was founded there.

== Background ==
The Royal Proclamation of 1763 that ended the French and Indian War declared lands west of the Appalachians as "Indian Territory" forbidden to colonial settlement. Continued provocations by colonial explorers, traders and trappers necessitated some concessions by the Indians to concede lands for settlement in exchange for peace. In the 1768 Treaty of Fort Stanwix, the Haudenosaunee ceded their claims on lands south of the Ohio River to the British Empire. Although they claimed sovereignty over much of what is now Kentucky, the Haudenosaunee did not actually reside there, as did their nominal vassal, the Shawnee. In addition, the Cherokee to the south and southeast used much of the area as their historical hunting grounds. Neither of these peoples had been consulted regarding the Stanwix treaty, although a series of borders was worked out with the Cherokee at the Treaty of Hard Labour (1768), the Treaty of Lochaber (1770), and once more in 1771 when they agreed to extend the Lochaber cession into present-day northeast Kentucky. The Shawnee, however, had not conducted a boundary agreement with the colonies since 1758 at the Treaty of Easton, giving them a claim to everything west of the Alleghenies. Consequently, they began to attack frontier settlers moving into the region. This led to Lord Dunmore's War, fought in 1774, primarily between the Shawnee and Virginia Colony. The Shawnee lost this brief war and their chief Cornstalk ceded all their claims south of the Ohio River, including Kentucky.

Also, through much of the second half of the 17th century, a state of war had existed between the "northern tribes" (particularly the Haudenosaunee, and the Lenape and Shawnee who were then tributary to them) and the "southern tribes" of the Cherokee and Catawba, the shared hunting grounds of Kentucky remained a contentious neutral zone.

== The Transylvania Company ==
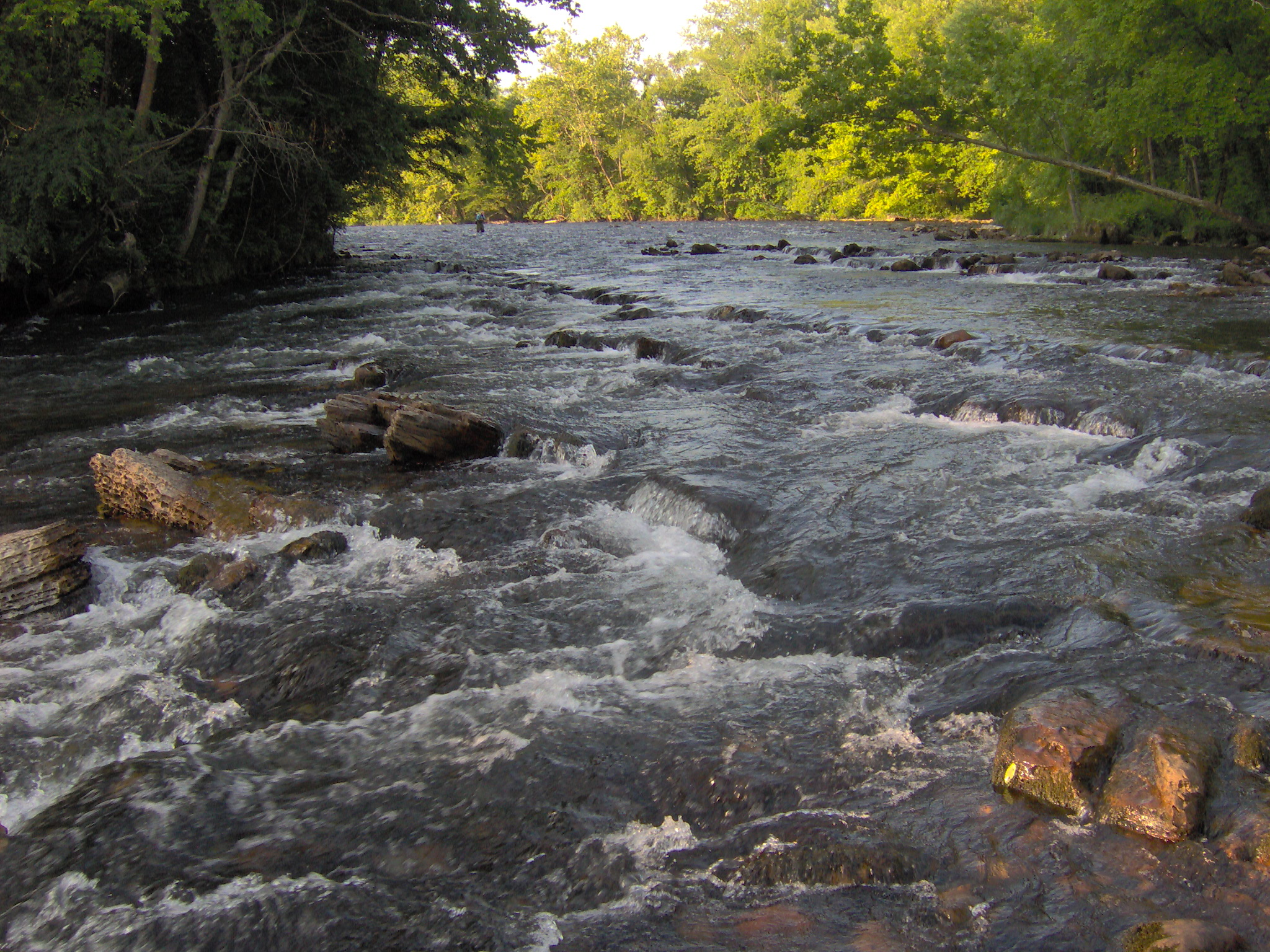
Sycamore Shoals at Elizabethton, Tennessee.

On 27 August 1774, Richard Henderson, a judge from North Carolina, organized a land speculation company with a number of other prominent North Carolinians. Originally called Richard Henderson and Company, the company name was first changed to the Louisa Company, and finally to the Transylvania Company on January 6, 1775. The Transylvania Company investors hoped to establish a British proprietary colony by purchasing the Kentucky lands from the Cherokee who had earlier settled much of the south and southeastern Kentucky areas and still claimed hunting rights in the abandoned Shawnee lands.

=== Treaty of Sycamore Shoals (a.k.a. Watauga Treaties) ===
In March 1775, Richard Henderson and Daniel Boone met with more than 1,200 Cherokee at Sycamore Shoals (present day Elizabethton in northeastern Tennessee). Present were Cherokee leaders such as Attakullakulla and Oconostota. With five grant deeds that constituted the Treaty of Sycamore Shoals, Henderson purchased all the land lying between the Cumberland River, the Cumberland Mountains, and the Kentucky River, and situated south of the Ohio River on March 14, 1775. Some adjacent land to the southeast, in Virginia and North Carolina, was also purchased. The land thus delineated, 20 million acres (81,000 km^{2}), encompassed an area half the size of present-day Kentucky.

Henderson and his partners probably believed that a recent British legal opinion, the Pratt–Yorke opinion, had made such purchases legal. In fact, the Transylvania Company's purchase was in violation of both Virginia and North Carolina law, as well as the Royal Proclamation of 1763, which prohibited private purchase of American Indian land and the establishment of any non-Crown sanctioned colony.

The treaty was disavowed by some of the chiefs. A dissident Cherokee chief, Dragging Canoe, refused to sign, endorse, or obey the Treaty of Sycamore Shoals, declaring that "it is bloody ground, and will be dark and difficult to settle". It would prove to be prophetic, and subsequently Kentucky came to be referred to by the sardonic phrase, dark and bloody ground. Dragging Canoe left the Sycamore Shoals treaty grounds and took those who were loyal to him and his way of thinking into southeastern Tennessee, near present-day Chattanooga. This group came to be called the "Chickamauga" after the nearby creek of the same name. Dragging Canoe and this group went on to become the chief protagonists of the Cherokee-American wars.

== Settlement ==
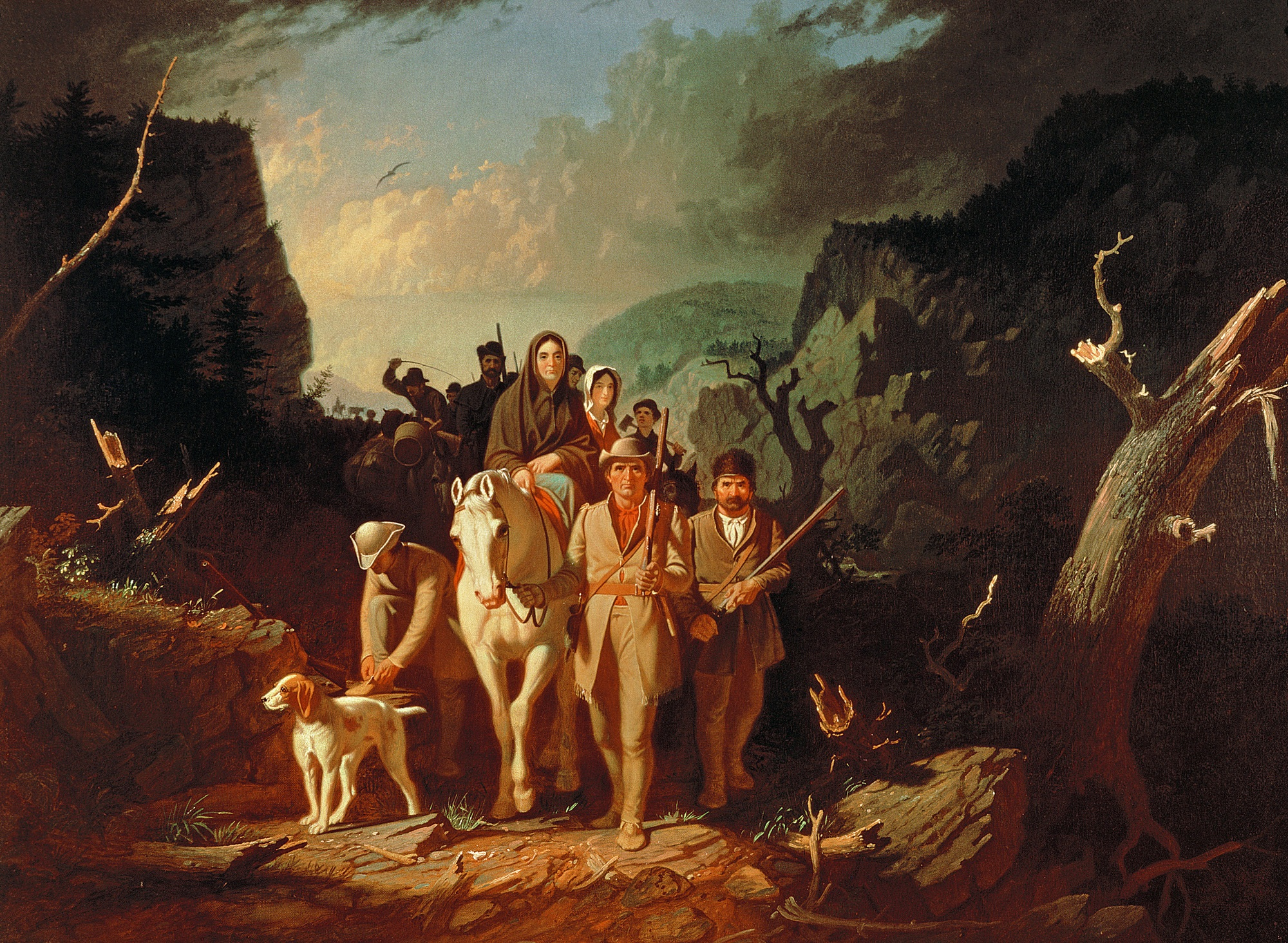
Daniel Boone Escorting Settlers through the Cumberland Gap (George Caleb Bingham, oil on canvas, 1851–52).

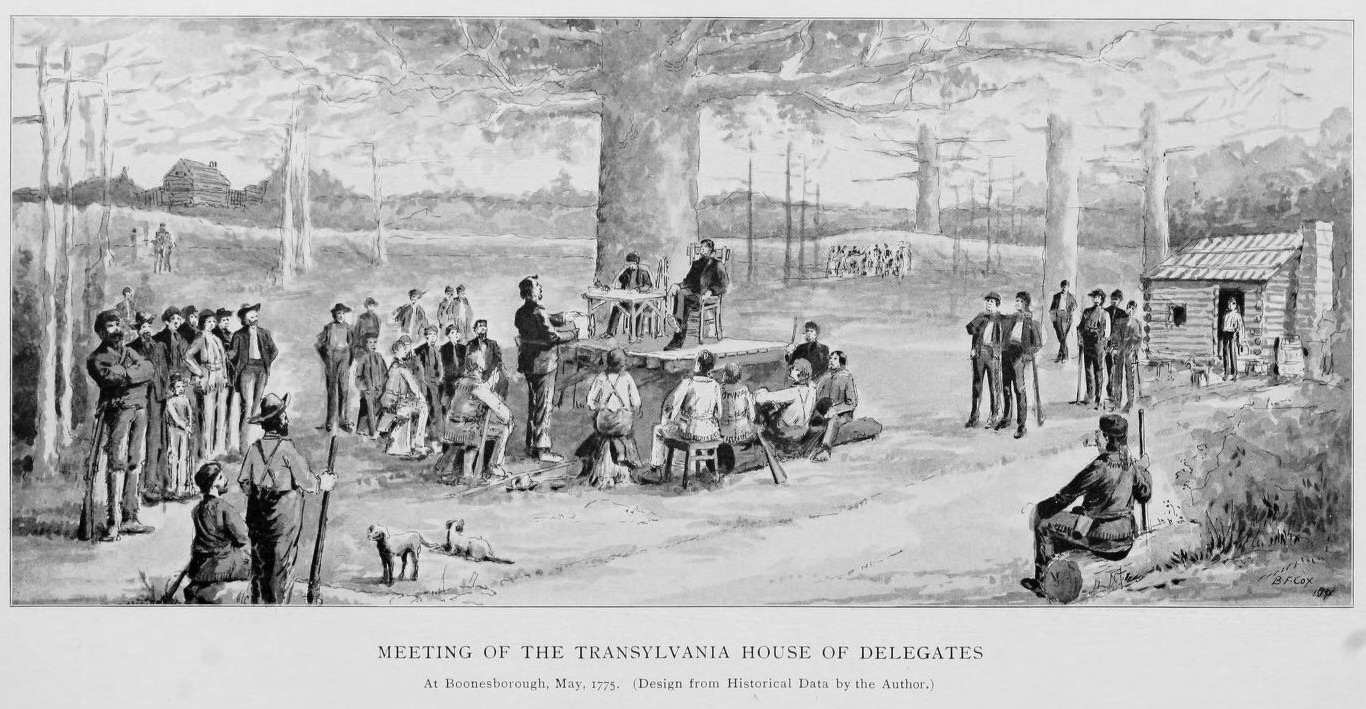
Meeting of the Transylvania House of Delegates. Anonymous sketch of the constitutional convention meeting "under the shade of a huge elm tree (the limbs of which extended at least a hundred feet wide)", convened by Richard Henderson.

Prior to the signing of the Sycamore Shoals Treaty, Henderson had hired Daniel Boone, an experienced hunter, to travel to the Cherokee towns and to inform them of the upcoming negotiations. Boone had been in southeast Kentucky long before the founding of any Kentucky settlements. Afterward, Boone was hired to blaze what became known as the Wilderness Road, which went from southwestern Virginia north through the Cumberland Gap and into central Kentucky. During this trail-blazing expedition, Boone and his party suffered several Indian attacks. Along with a party of about thirty workers, Boone cleared a path from the Cumberland Gap to the Kentucky River, where he established Boone's Station (today Boonesborough) which was intended to be the capital of Transylvania. Unknown to Boone, Henderson led another expedition following in Boone's tracks, widening the path so travellers could bring through wagons. In addition to Boone's Station, other settlements, including Harrod's Town, Logan's Fort (formerly St. Asaph), Lexington and Kenton's Station (also called Limestone) were established at this time. Many of these settlers had come to Kentucky on their own initiative, and some of them refused to recognize Transylvania's authority.

When Henderson arrived at Boonesborough fewer than a hundred people resided there. This population and a few other settlements in the area constituted the sparse concentration of white settlers in the isolated western wilderness. The settlers recognized their precarious situation. They not only faced significant Indian hostilities, but lacked adequate supplies and shelter. Notwithstanding these circumstances, Henderson urged settlers in the area to hold a constitutional convention.

Henderson's plan involved the various settlements scattered across Transylvania sending delegates to Boonesborough, acting in the name of the people they represented and whose consent would justify the convention. Representatives from Harrod's Town, Boiling Spring (adjacent to Harrod's Town), Logan's Fort and Boone's Station attended. In May 1775, under the shade of a huge elm tree, a three-day convention met. In addition to passing nine bills dealing with immediate matters of governance, delegates drafted a compact that organized a frame of government, known as the Transylvania Compact. This plan included executive, legislative, and judicial branches.

== Demise ==
After concluding the compact, Henderson returned to North Carolina. On behalf of his fellow investors in the land scheme, he petitioned the Continental Congress, seeking to make Transylvania a legally recognized colony. Despite those efforts, the Congress declined to act without the consent of Virginia and North Carolina, both of whom claimed jurisdiction over the region in question. In June 1776 the Virginia General Assembly prohibited the Transylvania Land Company from making any demands on settlers in the region. In December 1778, Virginia's Assembly finally declared the Transylvania claim void. In compensation, Henderson and his partners received a grant of 200,000 acres (312 square miles) on the Ohio River below the mouth of Green River. An early settlement there was named Red Banks, and became the city of Henderson in 1797.

Henderson pressed on with his remaining modest claim in Tennessee, and it was finally invalidated by North Carolina in 1783. Henderson was similarly compensated there with a land grant of 200,000 acres in Powell Valley.

== See also ==
- Vandalia Colony, which would have abutted Transylvania along the Kentucky River
- Isaac Shelby, surveyor for the Transylvania Company and future KY governor
- Transylvania University namesake, but unrelated to the Transylvania Purchase
- Henderson County, Kentucky, the namesake county whose seat was Henderson
