= Aboriginal title statutes in the Thirteen Colonies =

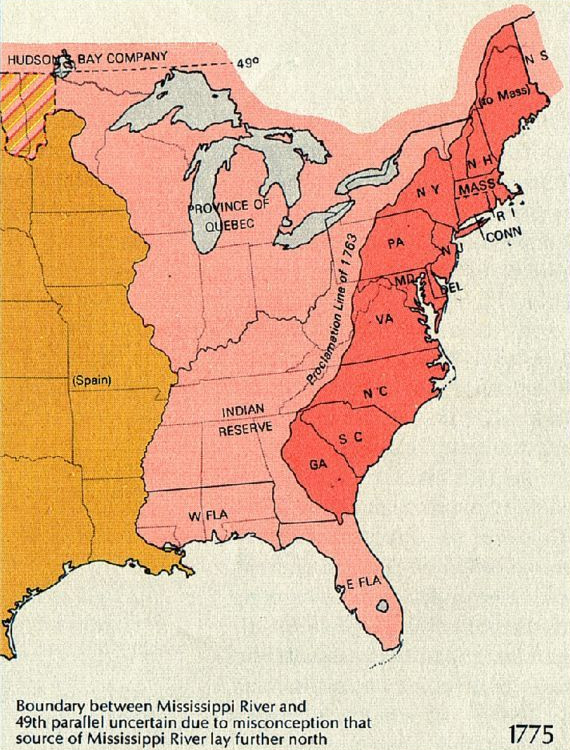
A map of British North America, as affected by the Royal Proclamation of 1763

Aboriginal title statutes in the Thirteen Colonies were one of the principal subjects of legislation by the colonial assemblies in the Thirteen Colonies. With the exception of Delaware, every colony codified a general prohibition on private purchases of Native American lands without the consent of the government. Disputes were generally resolved by special interest legislation or war. Mohegan Indians v. Connecticut (1705–73), a lawsuit that proceeded for 70 years under special royal enabling acts only to be dismissed on non-substantive grounds, was the first and only judicial test of indigenous tenure.

Aboriginal title remained a central political and economic issue and was listed as one of the enumerated grievances in the Declaration of Independence. Regardless, colonial land law relating to indigenous peoples became the foundation for aboriginal title in the United States during the Articles of Confederation-era and after the ratification of the United States Constitution. The colonial-law prohibition was codified at the federal level by the Confederation Congress Proclamation of 1783 and the Nonintercourse Acts of 1790, 1793, 1796, 1799, 1802, and 1834.

Pre-Revolutionary land transactions remained the subject of political and legal disputes well after Independence. However, in sharp contrast to post-1790 transactions, no Indian tribe has yet succeeded in litigating or receiving compensation for a pre-1790 transaction. The prevailing view remains that the colonial governments, and the state governments that succeeded them during the Confederation era, had the power to authorize the alienation of indigenous lands within their borders.

== British law ==
The British monarchy made two attempts to regulate aboriginal land transactions in British North America by Royal Proclamation: first, the Royal Proclamation of 1622; second, the Royal Proclamation of 1763.

== Statutes by colony ==
=== Connecticut ===
The Connecticut Colony (est. 1636) and the New Haven Colony (est. 1637) merged in 1662.

==== Connecticut Colony ====
In 1637, the Connecticut Colony authorized a military expedition to Pequot lands to "maynteine our right that God by Conquest hath given to us." Soon after, the colony decided to hold sachem's liable for the trespass of any Indian. The conquered Pequot land's were "dispose[d] . . . with lest prejudice to others that may hereafter succeed them."

The first prohibitions on transactions prohibited leases, either to or from Indians. The first prohibition on taking Indian property did not arise until 1660. This was explicitly extended to land acquisitions in 1663. The prohibition was strengthened in 1680. The penalties were increased again in 1687.

"Gold Hill" was the first Indian reservation in the colony, established in 1659 and confirmed in 1678. Indians were also explicitly permitted to use public lands for hunting. In other instances, the colony resolved land disputes between competing Indians. Other reservations were established for the Mohegans in New London in 1718 and others in 1726 (which were exempted from the application of adverse possession), including the Pequot's before 1731.

The power to purchase Indian lands was delegated to townships in 1702. In 1706, the colony offered amnesty for those who had purchased in violation of previous prohibitions as long as they provided a "true account." In 1717, the colony declared "all lands in this government are holden of the King of Great Britain as the lord of the fee," barred the introduction of private purchases as evidence, and established a committee to "settle this whole affair." Noting that the prohibition was among the most "ancient laws" of the colony, the fine was increased in 1722, and treble damages were imposed. No compensation was provided in the case of eminent domain.

==== New Haven ====
Prior to merging with the Connecticut Colony, the New Haven Colony also prohibited private purchases of Indian lands unless "in the name and for the use of the whole plantation."

=== Delaware ===
Delaware appears to have passed no laws concerning Indian lands.

=== Georgia ===
In 1758, Georgia passed a prohibition of private purchases of Indian lands:

[I]f any person or persons whosoever shall attempt to purchase or contract for, or cause to be purchased or contracted for, or shall take or acept of a grant or conveyance of any lands or tracts of lands from any Indian, or body of Indians, upon any prtence whatsoever, (except for the use of the crown and that by permission for this purpose first had and obtained from his majesty, his heirs or successors, or his or their governor or commander in chief of the said province for the time being) every such purchase, grant, contract and conveyance, shall be, and is and are hereby declared to be null and void, to all intentts an purposes whatsoever . . . .

=== Maryland ===
In 1639 Maryland codified separate prohibitions on land purchases from Indians and non-English Europeans, set to expire at the end of the next session of the general assembly; the latter provided:

Neither Shall [a subject of the King] obteine procure or accept of any Land within this Province from any Indian to his own or the use of any other than the Lord Proprietarie or his heirs[,] nor shall hold or possess and land . . . and upon pain that every person offending . . . Shall forfeit and lose to the Lord Proprietarie and his heirs all Such Lands so accepted or held without Grant of the Lord Proprietarie under him.

This forfeiture provision was renewed in 1649. Indian reservations were established in 1666. Their boundaries were modified in 1698, and enlarged in 1711. Indian reservation boundaries were re-surveyed in 1721. The Nanticoke reservation was extinguished in 1768.

Unlike many colonies, Maryland provided limited legal remedies for the violation of Indian property rights. In 1704, the colony provided that non-Indians who took timber from Indian lands would be "lyable to Action or Actions of trespass[,] And the persons grieved shall and may recover their Damages accordingly." It later authorized specific proceedings for "Indian-English" disputes; in the third such authorization, jurisdiction was extended to "punishing Trespasses committed on their Lands," claims arising from the renting of Indian lands, and "Trespasses and Wastes on such of the said Indian Lands, which have not been granted to any of the Inhabitants of this Province."

=== Massachusetts ===
The Plymouth Colony (est. 1620) and the Massachusetts Bay Colony (est. 1628) merged in 1691. After the combination of the two colonies, in 1701, a new prohibition was codified:

[A]ll deeds of bargain, sale, lease, release, or quitclaim, titles and conveyances whatsoever, of any lands . . . within this province . . . had, made, gotten, procured or obtained from any Indian or Indians by any person or persons whatsoever at any time [since 1633] without the license or approbation of the respective general courts of the said late colonys [or the current colony for purchases after 1701] shall be deemed and adjuded in the law to be null, void and of none effect.

The law validated all titles in Martha's Vineyard and the Island of Nantuckett and all other titles preceded by a grant from the colony. Henceforth, any violator would be subject to a fine of twice the value of the land and 6 months in prison. In 1719, the Mashpee's lands were exempted, and their sale was authorized in 1777.

In 1723, the Hassanimscoe were exempted from property tax. In 1736, they were granted a 6 miles square reservation, whose borders were amended several times in 1737 and 1739. Indian lands within the township of Edgartown on Chappaquiddick were protected for 3 years in 1774.

==== Plymouth ====
A 1643 Plymouth statute acknowledged the "constant custome from our first beginning That no person or persons have or ever did purchase Rent or hire any lands . . . of the Natives but by the Majestrates consent" and proscribed:

[I]f any person or persons do hereafter purchase or rent or hyre and lands . . . of any of the Natives in any place within this government with the consent and assent of the Court Every such person or persons shall forfait [fives times the value plus five pounds for every acre].

In 1652, the colony legislated an exception to this prohibition, for those who had failed to satisfy the conditions of their land grants resulting in the lands being re-granted to other non-Indians. The exception was only to last for 14 months from the end of the Court session, but was extended until June 1656. The colony later retroactively validated some purchases made in violation of this prohibition. In 1660, the prohibition was interpreted to apply to gifts of land. In 1663, the prohibition was extended to mere use. In 1668, the prohibition was extended to "mount hope or Cawsumsett necke or any other neckes or tracts of land as there is a body of Indians upon"; as amended, the lands would be forfeited to the colony if the purchaser could not afford the fine.

In 1674, the colony established a one-year statute of limitations "concerning Indian claims that are or shalbe made to any lands within this Government; which are now orderly possessed by the English those which doe lay claime to them shall orderly comence and prosecute theire claime as farr as hee or they are able; wihtine one yeare after they be of age; and noe longer and that care be taken that the Indians have notice of it."

==== Massachusetts Bay ====
The Massachusetts Bay colony codified its first prohibition on private purchases of Indian lands in 1634: "[N]oe person whatsoever shall buy any land of any Indean without leave from the Court." The first land recording law, instructed Steven Winthrope to record, inter alia, "all the purchases of the natives."

The Code of 1648 codified the prohibition such: "It is ordered by Authoritie of this Court; that no person whatsoever shall henceforth buy land of any Indian, without licence first had and obtained of the General Court: and if any shall offend heerin, such land so bought shall be forfeited to the Countrie." A 10-pounds-per-acre forfeiture was ordered in 1687.

In 1652, the colony acknowledged aboriginal title, in a statute that made reference to several biblical verses:

[W]hat lande any of the Indians, within this jurissdiction, have by possession or improvement, by subdueing of the same, they have just right thereunto, according to that Gen: 1: 28, chap: 9: 1, Psa.: 115, 16. And... if any of the Indians shalbe brought to civillitie... such Indians shall have allotments... according to the custome of the English in the like case.

Only if the Indians were evicted from "planting groundes or fishing places," were the Indians to "have reliefe in any of the Courts of justice amongst the English, as the English have."

In 1681, the Dedham Indians were confined to the towns of Nanticke, Punkapauge. and Wamesti. In 1685, the colony confirmed 5,800 acres of land to Indians in Marlborough and voided all deeds to the contrary.

=== New Hampshire ===
New Hampshire codified a rather weak prohibition against private purchases in 1641: "[W]hoever buys the Indian Ground by way of purchase is to tender it first to the town [of Exeter] before they are to make proper use of it in particular to themselves." In 1677, the colony ordered the resettlement of the Piscataqua Indians. The colony's instructions to Edmund Andros in 1686 included instructions to purchase Indian lands.

New Hampshire codified a more serious prohibition in 1687:

[H]enceforth noe person or persons whatsoever Doe presume to tamper or treat with any Indian or Indians about the purchase sale or Confirmation of any Land or Lands whatseover within this his Majesties Territory and Dominion of the New England NOR from them or any of them take or receive any Deed or Sale Gift Mortgage Conveyance Lease Contract or Confirmation whatsoever without Leave or Lycense first had and obteyned from the Governour for the tyme being under his hand and Seale On peanlty of Forfeiture of [20 pounds per acre] AND that all such... shall be utterly void and null.

In 1719, penalties were added, retroactive to violations from 1700: forfeiture, a fine of the value of the land, and 6 months in prison.

=== New Jersey ===
In May 1683, the colony authorized a Commissioner to buy lands from Indians and resell the lands in plots not to exceed 5000 acres each. In September 1683, the colony codified a prohibition against private purchases:

[N]o Person or Persons, shall presume to buy any Tract or Tracts of Land, of, or from the Indians within this Province, without special Order and Authority to him and them given by the Governor and Commissioners, or the major Part of them for the time being.

Any purchase to the contrary would be "null and void" and subject to a fine of 5 shillings per acre. The prohibition was included in the colony's instructions to Lord Cornbury. In 1703, the prohibition was made more specific, to include "Gift of Purchase in Fee, take a Mortuage or Lease for Life or number of Years"; the authorization method was changed to "Certificate, under the hand of the Proprietors Recorder"; the fine was raised to 40 shillings per acre; and the forfeiture provision was applied to "Purchasers, their Heirs and Assigns shall forever hereafter be incapable to hold Plea for the said Land in any Court of Common Law or Equity."

In 1758, the colony appropriated for the Commissions "such Sum and Sums of Money, as they may find necessary to purchase the Right and Claim of all or any of the Indian Natives of this Colony, to and for the Use of the Freeholders in this Colony, their Heirs and Assigns, for ever"; the maximum appropriation was to be 1600 pounds, no more than half of which was to go to the Delawares near Cranbury. As recounted by later, unrelated, judicial opinion:

In 1758 the State of New Jersey purchased the Indian title to lands in that State, and as a consideration for the purchase, bought a tract of land as a residence for the Indians, having previously passed an act declaring that such lands should not be subject thereafter to any tax by the State, any law or usage, or law then existing, to the contrary notwithstanding. The Indians, from the time of purchase, lived upon the land until the year 1801, when they were authorized, by an act of the Legislature, to sell the land.

=== New York ===
The Director and Council of New Netherland passed a law holding citizens liable for damages to Indian crops in 1640. In 1652, the colony legislated to ""hereby dissolve, annul and make void all claimed or occupied purchases, sales, patents and deeds signed." Previous purchases were confirmed in 1670.

The General Assembly of New York codified a prohibition on private purchases of Indian lands in 1684:

[H]enceforward noe Purchase of Lands from the Indians shall bee esteemed a good Title without Leave first had and obtained from the Governour signed by a Warrant under his hand and Seale and entered on Record in the the [sic] Secretaries office att New Yorke and Satisfaction for the Purchase acknowliged by the Indians from whome the Purchase was made which is to bee Recorded likewise with purchase soe made and prosecuted and entered on Record in the office aforesaid shall from that time be Vallid to all intents and purposes.

=== North Carolina ===
North Carolina defined its boundaries with the Meherrin Indians in 1729. In 1748, the colony passed a prohibition on private purchases which applied only to Tuscarora lands, and imposed a fine of 10 pounds for every 100 acres:

[N]o Person, for any Consideration whatsoever, shall purchase or buy any Tract or Parcle of Land, claimed, or in Possession of any Indian or Indians, but all such Bargains and Sales shall be, and are hereby declared to be null and void, and of none Effect.

The colony authorized the leases of Tuscarora lands in 1766.

=== Pennsylvania ===
The colony passed its first prohibition on private purchases of Indian lands in 1683:

[I]f anie person shall presume to buy any Land of the Natives in the Limits of this Province or territories thereof, without Leave from the Proprietary and Governor therof, or his desputy, Such person shall Lose the said Land, and pay [fine of 10 shilings per 100 acres].

The statute was abrogated by the crown in 1683, but re-enacted the same year. A similar law was passed in 1700 and supplemented in 1730 by more specific legislation (and exempted from any statute of limitations).

The colony passed legislation to clear title to all land grants from the colony in 1712; the act declared such grants "free and clear, and freely and clearly acquitted and discharged, or otherwise well and sufficiently saved harmless and indemnified by the said proprietary, his heirs and assigns, of and from all Indian claims, and all other [claims of non-Indians]."

In 1768, the colony proscribed violations of the Royal Proclamation of 1763; the punishment was to be "death without the benefit of clergy." In 1769, the punishment was set at a 500-pound fine, 1 year in prison without bail or mainprise, plus a moiety paid to the poor.

=== Rhode Island ===
Early Rhode Island laws restricted Indians from certain areas. Later laws were also passed in this vein.

In 1651, the colony passed its prohibition on private purchases of Indian lands:

[N]o purchase shall be made of any Land of the natives for a plantation without the consent of this State, except it bee for the clearinge of the Indians from some particular planatations already sett down upon; and if any shall so purchase, they shall forfeit the Land so purchased to the Collonie . . . .

A 20-pound fine was added in 1658. The wording of the prohibition was broadened and a 100-pound fine was added in 1727. The colony repealed its prohibition on private purchases of Indian lands in 1759. Certain sachems were prohibited from selling land in 1763.

A 1663 law purported to commemorate the "surrender of [the Narragansetts], their subjects and their lands" to the protection of the King. The colony authorized the acquisition of certain Narragansett lands in 1672. In 1696 and 1713, laws were passed to void the purchases of various Narragansett lands. Leases were permitted in 1718 and extended in 1738.

=== South Carolina ===
The colony established the Palawanee Island as a reservation for the "Cusaboe" Indians in 1712. In contrast, the colony appropriated Yamasee lands in 1716.

In 1739, the colony passed its prohibition on private purchases of Indian lands:

[N]o person or persons whatever shall buy, bargain or treat for, or by any way or means whatever, procure, hold, obtain, or get any lands . . . from any Indian or Indians whatever.

=== Virginia ===
Early colonial laws removed or permitted settlers on Indian lands on an ad hoc basis. The first Indian reservations were established in 1649. A Totopotomoi reservation was confirmed in 1653; a "Wiccomocco" reservation in 1659; an "Accomack" reservation in 1660; a "Chickaominy" reservation in 1661 and 1662.

Prohibitions on private purchases of Indian lands were passed in 1649, 1652, and 1656. A new prohibition was passed in 1752. The right of pre-emption was delegated to Northampton County in 1654.

Title clearing acts were passed in 1660 and 1676. Reservation boundaries were tightened in 1705. Various sales ad leases were authorized or retroactively confirmed in the 1720s through 1770s.

== See also ==
- Indian barrier state
- Indian Reserve (1763)
