= Wicomico =

The name Wicomico may refer to the following:

- The Wicocomico or Wicomico people, an Algonquian-speaking Native American tribe, part of whom lived in the Tidewater region of Virginia
- Wicomico River (disambiguation), several rivers tributary to the Chesapeake Bay watershed
- Wicomico County, Maryland
- USS Wicomico (YT-26), formerly USS Choctaw, a yard tug in the United States Navy
- Wicomico High School
