= Line of Property =

Line established in 1768 to separate native and British colonial lands in North America

The Line of Property is the name commonly given to the line dividing Indian lands from those of the Thirteen Colonies, which were established in the 1768 Treaty of Fort Stanwix between British officials and the Iroquois tribes. In western Pennsylvania, it is referred to as the Purchase line.

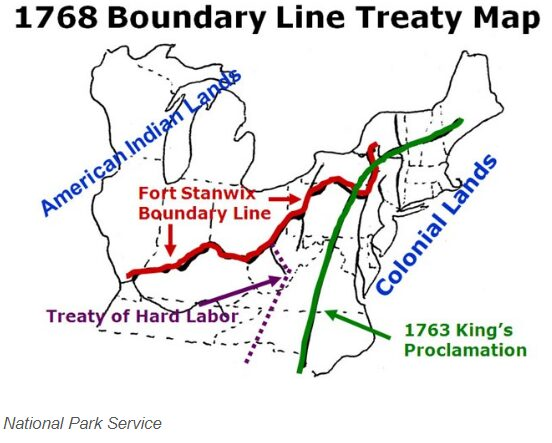
Boundary line map 1768 agreed to by Indians at the Treaty of Fort Stanwix; the new red line replaced the green line of 1763

== Treaty description of the line ==
As written with original spellings and place names; (modern names in parentheses):

- "Beginning at the Mouth of the Cherokee or Hogohee River" (Tennessee River) "where it empties into the River Ohio" (at Paducah, Kentucky)
- "& running from thence upwards along the South side of said River to Kittanning, which is above Fort Pitt" (Pittsburgh, Pennsylvania)
- "from thence a direct Line to the nearest Fork of the west branch of Susquehanna
- "thence through the Allegany Mountains along the south side of the said West Branch until it comes opposite to the mouth of a creek called Tiadaghton" (Pine Creek just west of Jersey Shore, Pennsylvania)
- "thence across the West Branch along the South Side of that Creek"
- "and along the North Side of Burnetts Hills to a Creek called Awandae" (Towanda Creek)
- "thence down the same to the East Branch of Sasquehanna" (at Towanda, Pennsylvania)
- "& across the same and up the East side of that River to Oswegy" (Owego, New York)
- "from thence East to Delawar River" (Delaware River)
- "and up that River to opposite where Tianaderha" (Unadilla River) "falls into Sasquehanna" (Susquehanna River)
- "thence to Tianaderha" (New Berlin, New York?) "and up the West side of the West branch" (Beaver Creek) "to the head thereof"
- "& thence by a direct Line to Canada Creek, where it empties into the Wood Creek at the West of the Carrying Place beyond Fort Stanwix" (Rome, New York).

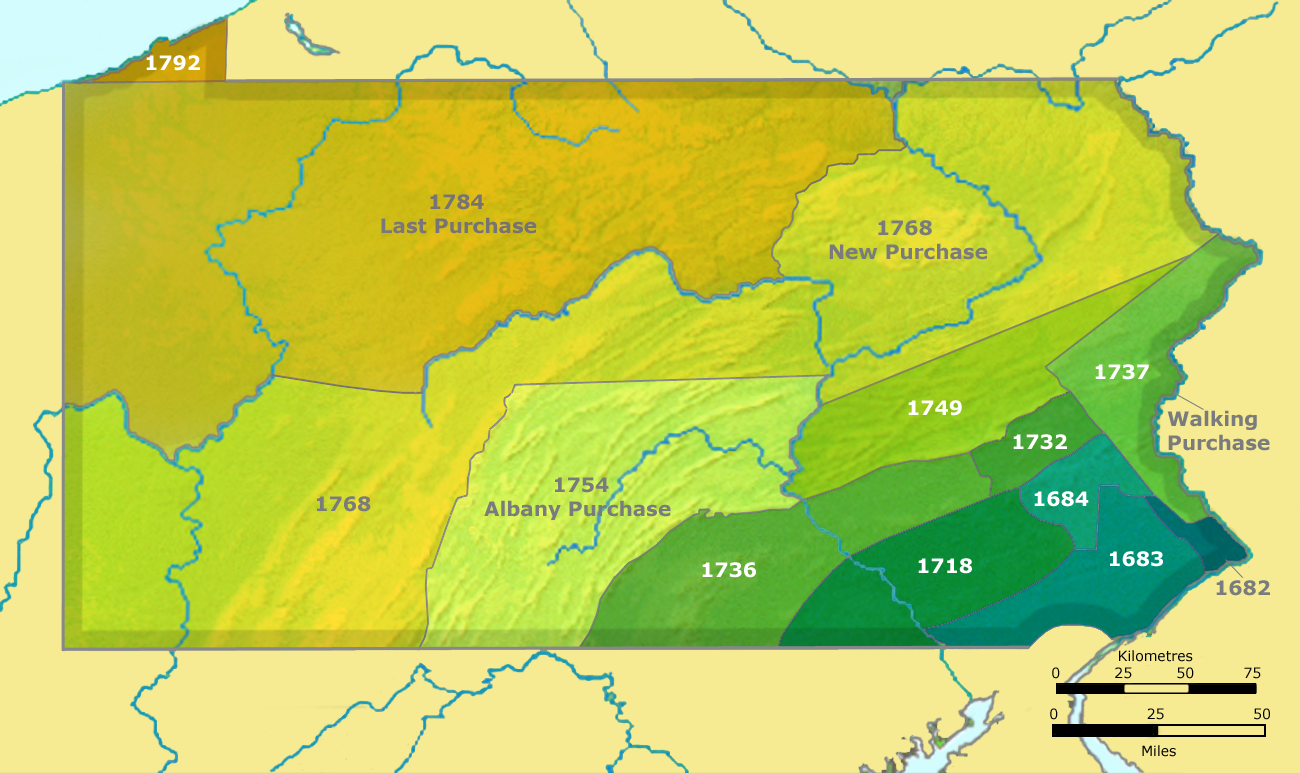
Map showing Pennsylvania and the territory involved in the purchase of 1768.

== Actual line ==
The starting point is the confluence of the Tennessee River with the Ohio River at Paducah, Kentucky. The line follows the south bank of the Ohio almost the entire length of Kentucky and all of West Virginia to Pittsburgh where the Allegheny River joins the Monongahela River to form the Ohio. It then follows the Allegheny River north.

For the line from Kittanning, Pennsylvania, to the "nearest fork" of the west branch of the Susquehanna River at Cherry Tree, Pennsylvania, see the article on the Purchase line.

From Cherry Tree the line followed the West Branch on its sinuous course due north and then northeast to Clearfield, Pennsylvania, and then meandered through the deep gorges of the Alleghenies past Renovo, Pennsylvania, exiting the mountains into Bald Eagle Valley at Lock Haven, Pennsylvania, and then east-northeast to the confluence with Pine Creek at Jersey Shore, Pennsylvania.

The next section of the line is difficult to fix, since the "Burnetts Hills" of the treaty never been positively identified. Also, the distance to follow Pine Creek, let alone which of the forks of that Creek to follow, is not specified.

The only part of this section that can be definitely established is the lowest (easternmost) portion of Towanda Creek from Monroeton, Pennsylvania to Towanda, Pennsylvania.

From Jersey Shore to this point there are two competing interpretations.

The first interpretation is that the line was intended to follow the principal (west) branch of Towanda Creek which runs eastward along the base of the very prominent north face of Barclay Mountain (which forms the northernmost range of the Endless Mountains) from Canton, Pennsylvania to Towanda.

Then the question is how the line was intended to run from Jersey Shore to Towanda Creek. This creek rises a few miles south of Canton at the watershed divide that marks the tri-point between Tioga County, Pennsylvania, Bradford County, Pennsylvania, and Lycoming County, Pennsylvania. Most likely, the line was intended to reach the Towanda Creek headwaters along the headwaters of Lycoming Creek, which flows southwest along the base of Barclay Mountain to Roaring Branch, Pennsylvania, where it is joined by Roaring Branch which itself follows the base of Laurel Hill upstream in the same direction from a watershed divide at Jackson Corners on US 15. This is then the headwaters of Blockhouse Creek which flows in the same direction into Little Pine Creek, which flows into Pine Creek at Waterville; from there Pine Creek flows down to the West Branch at Jersey Shore, Pennsylvania.

A second interpretation is based primarily on the existence of a Burnett's Ridge in Lycoming County on the east of PA14 beginning at Bodines south of Ralston, Pennsylvania and running east into Sullivan County, Pennsylvania; on its plateau are the headwaters of Schrader Creek, a major tributary of Towanda Creek which flows to the south of Barclay Mountain. The line would presumably follow Pleasant Stream upstream from Lycoming Creek at Marsh Hill, Pennsylvania to the watershed divide near Wheelerville in Sullivan County and then down Schrader Creek; this is the route later taken by the Susquehanna and New York Railroad and is the easiest and most direct footpath between the two branches of the Susquehanna River.

The difficulty with the second interpretation is that it would require the line to follow Lycoming Creek which flows into the West Branch just west of Williamsport, Pennsylvania, not Pine Creek. This would require the identification of "Tiadaghton" with the Lycoming, which is contrary to many other documented uses of the "Tiadaghton" name. The line would then have continued some miles down the Susquehanna from Pine Creek before turning into the hills.

The sketch map of 1768 is ambiguous and its geometry is very poor, but it seems to favor the second interpretation. It seems to show a section of the West Branch between what is labeled the Tiadaghton (Pine Creek) and the stream actually followed by the line somewhat to the east; this would appear to be Lycoming Creek.

The second interpretation would have been in favor of the Indians, adding the valley lands from Jersey Shore to Williamsport and a large hunting area at the headwaters of Pine Creek to their portion.

An extensive discussion of this issue, with strong evidence in favor of the second interpretation, is presented in "The Fair Play Settlers of the West Branch Valley, 1769-1785: A Study of Frontier Ethnography" by Wolf, G. D. (1969). This interpretation led to the settlers on the north bank of the Susquehanna between Pine and Lycoming Creeks to be outside the authority of Pennsylvania, until further treaties were signed.

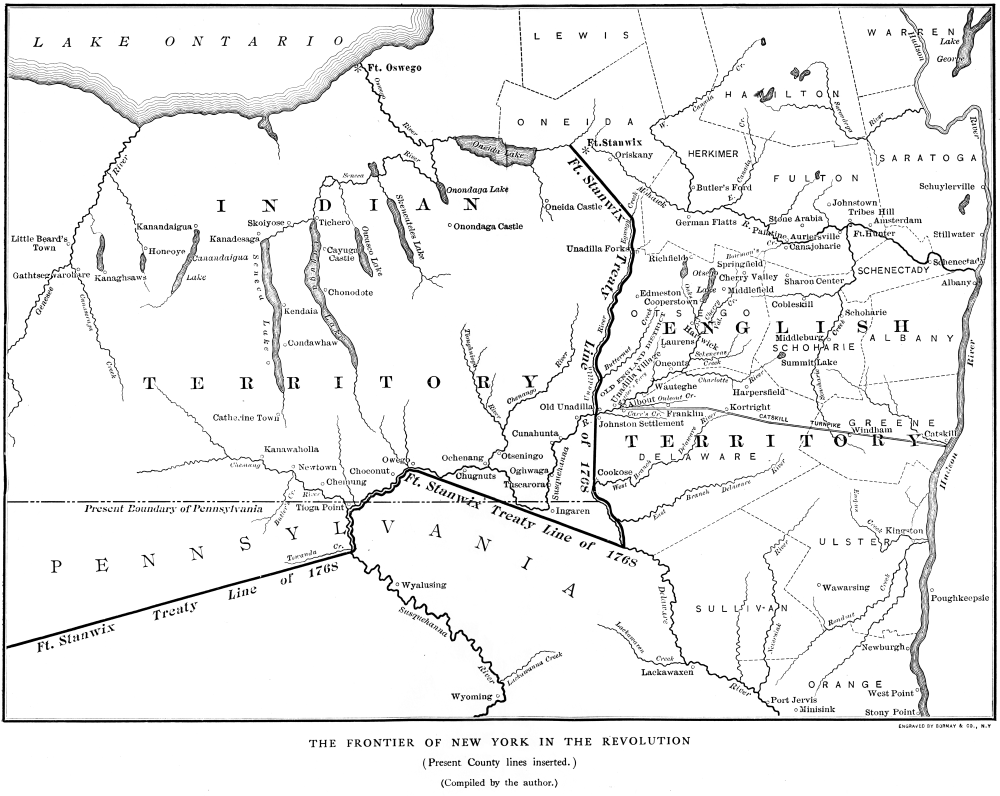
Map from The Old New York Frontier by Francis W. Halsey (1901) showing the author's interpretation of the 1768 Fort Stanwix Treaty line

From Towanda, the Pennsylvania line followed the East Branch of the Susquehanna River upstream past Tioga Point (present day Athens, Pennsylvania) and then east to Owego, New York.

The section of the line east from Owego is also troublesome, because of the faulty geographic references of the negotiators. The line was to follow a straight line from Owego east to the Delaware River and upriver to a point due south of the confluence of the Unadilla River and east branch of the Susquehanna River just west of Sidney, New York. Apparently the surveys of the day were too poor to realize that a line due east from Owego at the Owego Creek/Susquehanna confluence (at 42° 05' 41"N) would not have intersected the Delaware River before reaching the line directly south from the mouth of the Unadilla. The sketch map of 1768 places the Delaware much too far north, and shows the projected east-west line intersecting it below the confluence of the East Branch at Hancock, which is actually considerably to the south of the latitude of Owego. Thus at some point the line was adjusted to the Oquaga Creek/Delaware River confluence (at 42° 03' 27"N) at Deposit, New York, which forms a natural corner point at the big bend in the West Branch of the Delaware. It is probable that this portion of the line was never surveyed before the Revolution, but instead a north-south line (present-day boundary between the towns of Tioga and Owego in Tioga County, New York) was dropped from Owego to the New York–Pennsylvania border near the 42nd parallel north sometime after this border was surveyed in 1786, and the Delaware River was followed a few miles upstream (north) from the initial monument of this border near the 42nd parallel north to reach Deposit.

The line to the mouth of the Unadilla was then drawn straight from Deposit, a bit east of north. This is the modern-day boundary between Broome County, New York and Chenango County, New York (west or Indian side) and Delaware County, New York (east or Colonial side).

The Unadilla River then forms the modern-day boundary between Chenango County, New York (west) and Otsego County, New York (east); the "west branch of the Tianaderha" referred to is not the modern West Branch of the Unadilla that rises near Bridgewater, New York, but rather Beaver Creek a few miles to the west that flows through Brookfield, New York to join the Unadilla near New Berlin, New York; Beaver Creek rises at approximately 42° 55' 11" N, 75° 19' 01" W) near Hobin Corners on US 20.

The line then strikes out in a NW direction towards the named confluence (43° 13' 33" N, 75° 32' 39" W) west of present-day Rome, New York, near East Verona, New York. This is a few miles west of Rome, so that Fort Stanwix fell in lands assigned to the Colonials. The line as finally surveyed went through the Hamilton College campus on College Hill just west of Clinton, New York where there are two stone markers.

== Consequences ==
The first clause effectively cedes most of modern-day Kentucky and West Virginia to the Virginia colony.

This line substantially enlarged the Colonial area designated in the Royal Proclamation of 1763, especially in Pennsylvania. It also included a slice of New York State east of the Unadilla and west of the previous line of settlement near Cherry Valley. Thus the Iroquois ceded only a small area in New York state, a larger area in Pennsylvania, and a huge tract that was in fact south of their area of control.

== Maps ==
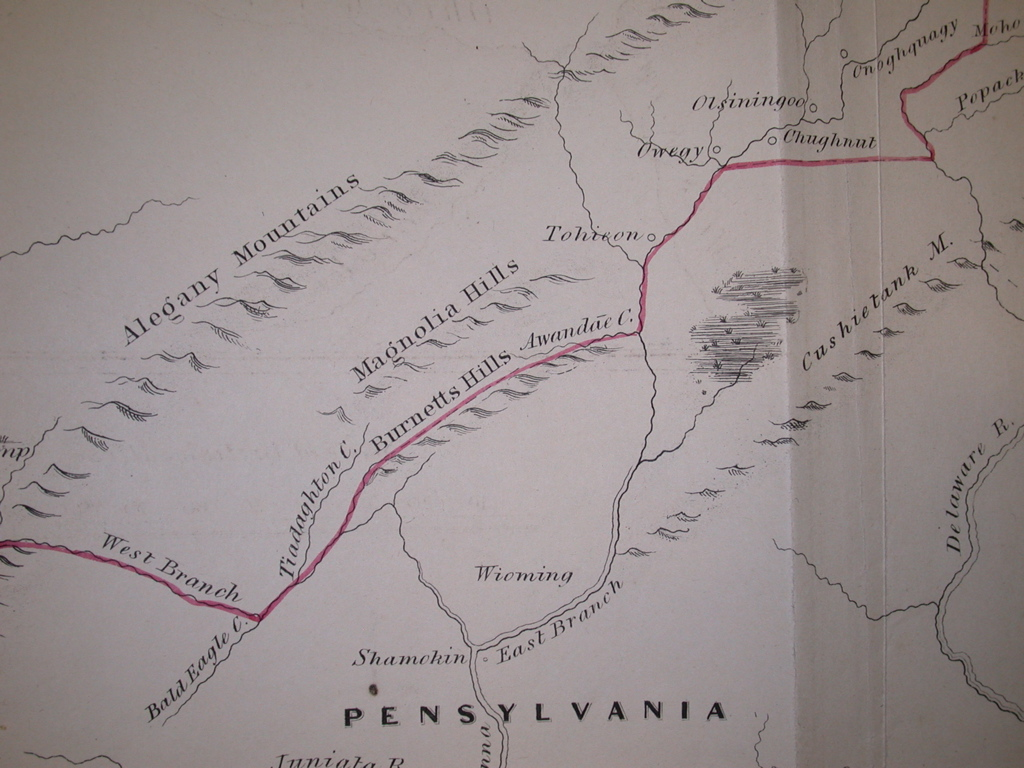
Fragment of Guy Johnson's map of the Line of Property 1768; section centered at Burnetts Hills

Fragment of Guy Johnson's map of the Line of Property 1768; section centered at Owego

Title block of Guy Johnson's map of the Line of Property 1768

== See also ==
- Treaty of Hard Labour (1768)
