= Indian barrier state =

Native American sovereignty proposal

The Indian barrier state was an unrealised British proposal to establish a Native American buffer state in the Great Lakes region of North America. It was intended to consist of territory west of the Appalachian Mountains and bounded by the Ohio and Mississippi rivers along with the Great Lakes. British officials first conceived of establishing such a state in 1755 during the French and Indian War, and the idea grew in importance after the war ended and Native dissatisfaction with the British resulted in Pontiac's War.

After the Great Lakes region was ceded to the United States in the 1783 Treaty of Paris that ended the American Revolutionary War, British officials and Native chiefs pursued efforts to organize the various tribes within it into the Northwestern Confederacy, which would form the basis of an Indian state independent of the United States and under British protection. Their goal was to protect the British component of the North American fur trade from American merchants and to block the westward expansion of American colonizers.

Among the plan's most ardent proponents were Mohawk leader Joseph Brant and Lieutenant-Governor John Graves Simcoe. In 1814, the British government abandoned efforts to bring such a state into being with the signing of the Treaty of Ghent with the United States, which ended the War of 1812.

== Proclamation of 1763 ==
The British first proposed a barrier state in discussions with France in 1755. In 1763, Britain took control of all of the land east of the Mississippi River, and so negotiations with France became irrelevant. Instead, the British Crown issued the Proclamation of 1763, which was designed to keep Anglo-American settlers east of the Appalachian Mountains and physically separate from the main Indian settlements. The proclamation left the west under British control but alienated the Thirteen Colonies, which claimed legal rights to most of the land involved. Furthermore, various colonial governments had awarded large tracts of land in lieu of salaries to Anglo-American soldiers who fought in the conflict, such as Colonel George Washington, who unsuccessfully pressed for and fellow veterans from Virginia received their promised rewards. There was great legal confusion for the next decade.

== American Revolution ==
Through the Quebec Act of 1774, the British made the western lands part of the Province of Quebec, denying American settlers the opportunity to colonize it. This was one of the Intolerable Acts that eventually led to the American Revolutionary War. The western lands were heatedly disputed during the Revolution with American Patriot forces first gaining control before the British defeated them in 1780–1782.

At the Paris treaty negotiations of 1782, the French floated a proposal that would give the British control north of the Ohio River, with the lands south of the Ohio River and east of the Mississippi River divided into two Indian states. The state to the southeast would be under American supervision. The state to the southwest would be under Spanish supervision. The Americans rejected the plan. The final Treaty of Paris gave the western lands to the United States, with the British-controlled Canadas to the north, Spanish Florida to the south, and Spanish Louisiana to the west.

The British largely abandoned their Indian allies in the Northwest. They were not a party to the treaty and did not recognize it until they were defeated militarily by the United States. The British continued to support their Indian allies, however, and sold them guns and supplies and until 1796, maintained forts in American territory.

The long-term British goals were to maintain friendly relations with the Indians, support the valuable fur trade based in Montreal, and prevent encroachment by American settlers. The Confederation Congress of the United States organized the entire region north of the Ohio into the Northwest Territory in 1787, with a mechanism to create new states once an area had gained sufficient population. Two years earlier, Congress had passed the Land Ordinance of 1785, which provided a means for the rapid surveying and sale of public lands in the region, thus encouraging organized settlement.

== 1790s ==
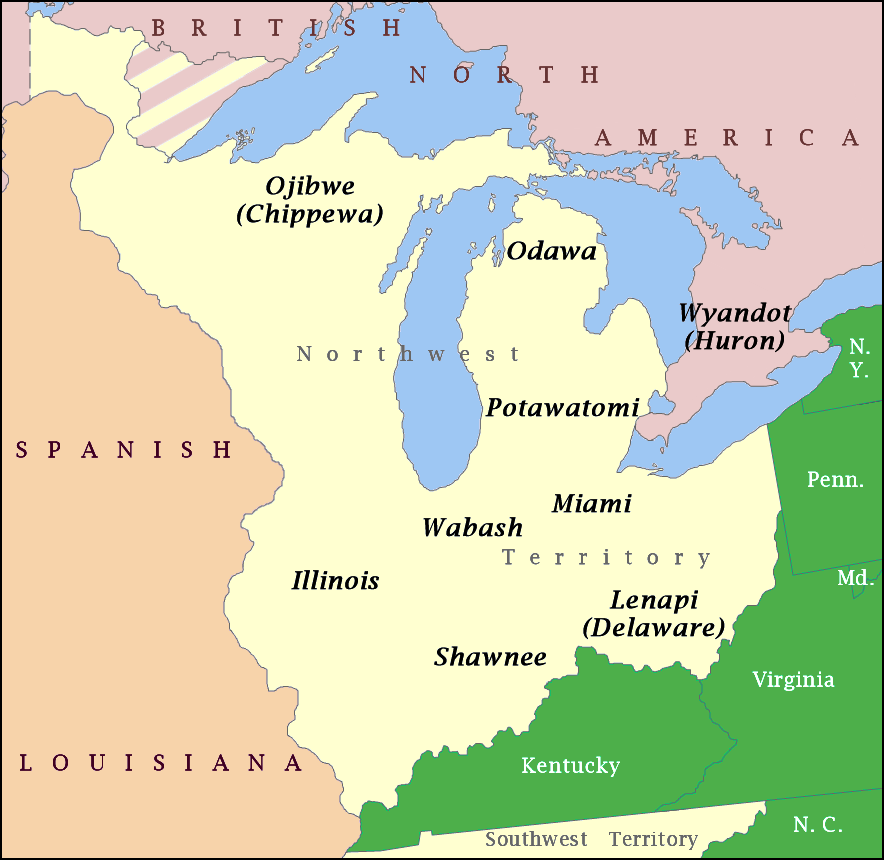
A map showing the general distribution of Native American tribes in the Northwest Territory in the early 1790s

In the early 1790s, British officials in Canada made an aggressive effort to organize the various tribes into a sort of confederation that would form the basis of an Indian state. An important impetus was the success of the Indians in destroying one-quarter of the entire United States Army at St. Clair's defeat, also known as the Battle of the Wabash, in November 1791. The British were surprised and delighted at the success of the Indians whom they had been supporting and arming for years. By 1794, using their base at Detroit, theoretically in American territory, they distributed supplies and munitions to numerous Indian tribes throughout the region.

The British plans were developed in Canada. In 1794 the government in London reversed course and decided it was necessary to gain American favor, since a major war had broken out with France. London put the barrier state idea on hold and opened friendly negotiations with the Americans that led to the Jay Treaty of 1794. One provision was that British acceded to American demands to remove their forts from American territory in Michigan and Wisconsin. Michigan was a province of upper Canada until 1796. The British, from their forts in Upper Canada, continued to supply munitions to the Indians resisting the expansion of the United States.

== War of 1812 ==
The War of 1812 in the Mississippi River theater was fought for control of the would-be barrier state. The British made major gains in 1812. A 2,000-strong American force surrendered Detroit and the Indian allies took control of parts of Ohio, Indiana and Illinois, as well as all of Michigan and Wisconsin and points west. In 1813, the Americans pushed back, and the Indian forces left the southern districts in order to support Tecumseh and the British. The Americans won control of Lake Erie, defeated an Anglo-Native force at the Battle of the Thames in Upper Canada, and killed Tecumseh. Most of his alliance broke up.

By 1814, the Americans controlled all of Ohio, all of Indiana, Illinois south of Peoria, and the Detroit region of Michigan. The British and their Indian allies controlled the rest of Michigan and all of Wisconsin. With the Americans in control of Lake Erie and southwestern Upper Canada, the British were largely cut off from their units in Michigan and Wisconsin. Reinforcing them and supplying guns and gunpowder was quite difficult.

The American negotiators at Ghent in 1814 refused to entertain proposals for a buffer state. They insisted on abiding by the terms of the Paris Peace Treaty and the Jay Treaty, which assigned the United States full control over Michigan, Wisconsin, and points south. Henry Goulburn, a British negotiator who took part in the Treaty of Ghent negotiations, remarked after meeting with American negotiators that "I had, till I came here, had no idea of the fixed determination which prevails in the breast of every American to extirpate the Indians and appropriate their territory."

In 1814, the British leadership in London realized that peaceful trade with the United States, as desired by British merchants, far outweighed in value the fur trade that was the economic basis of the barrier state. All three British invasions of the United States had ultimately ended in failure at the battles of Plattsburgh, Baltimore, and New Orleans. They therefore dropped their demands for a barrier state and for military control over the Great Lakes. The Treaty of Ghent provided for a restoration of prewar boundaries, which determine most of the eastern stretch of the modern Canada–United States border. The treaty also guaranteed rights to the Indians living in the United States. After the war, the United States negotiated, often forcibly, a series of treaties with the Indians in which their land claims were purchased, and the Indians were either assigned to reservations near their original homes or forced to move to reservations further west.

== See also ==
- Aboriginal title statutes in the Thirteen Colonies
- Indian removal
- Indian Reserve (1763)
- Origins of the War of 1812
- Overhill Cherokee
- Overmountain Men
- Tecumseh's Confederacy
- Trans-Appalachia
- Western Confederacy
- Western theater of the American Revolutionary War
- Wilderness Road
