= Wicomico River =

Wicomico River is the name of two rivers in Maryland in the United States:

- Wicomico River (Maryland eastern shore), in Wicomico County, Maryland, on the eastern shore of the Chesapeake Bay
- Wicomico River (Potomac River), a tributary of the Potomac River in south central Maryland

== See also ==
- Great Wicomico River, a tributary of Chesapeake Bay in eastern Virginia
- Little Wicomico River, a tributary of Chesapeake Bay in eastern Virginia
