= Purchase line =

The Purchase Line is the name commonly given to the line dividing Indian from British Colonial lands established in the Treaty of Fort Stanwix of 1768 in western Pennsylvania. In New York State documents, it is referred to as the Line of Property. That article contains the treaty text and other sections.

== History ==
The relevant section of the treaty reads:

- "from thence" (Kittanning) "a direct Line to the nearest Fork of the west branch of Susquehanna"

This line was not clearly defined until in a meeting between Indian and Pennsylvania representatives in 1773 at the well-known "Canoe Place" or upper limit of canoe navigation on the Susquehanna at its confluence with Cush Cushion Creek at present-day Cherry Tree, Pennsylvania. This was agreed to as the "nearest point" of the treaty. This became the tri-point between present-day Clearfield, Cambria, and Indiana counties, although the borough of Cherry Tree, Pennsylvania was later included entirely in Indiana for convenience.

The line is still a boundary through most of its length: in Armstrong County running ESE from Kittanning it separates the townships of Rayburn and Valley (north) from Manor and Kittanning (south). There is gap through the town of Cowanshannock, but at the knick point of the boundary between Armstrong County and Indiana County the line begins again, separating the Indiana County townships of South Mahoning, East Mahoning, Grant and Montgomery (north) from Washington, Rayne and Green (south). The hamlet of Purchase Line is on PA 286 in Green township just south of the actual line.

== Maps ==
Fragment of Guy Johnson's map of the Line of Property 1768; showing the portion in Pennsylvania; Purchase Line between the Allegheny and Susquehanna rivers on the west side of map

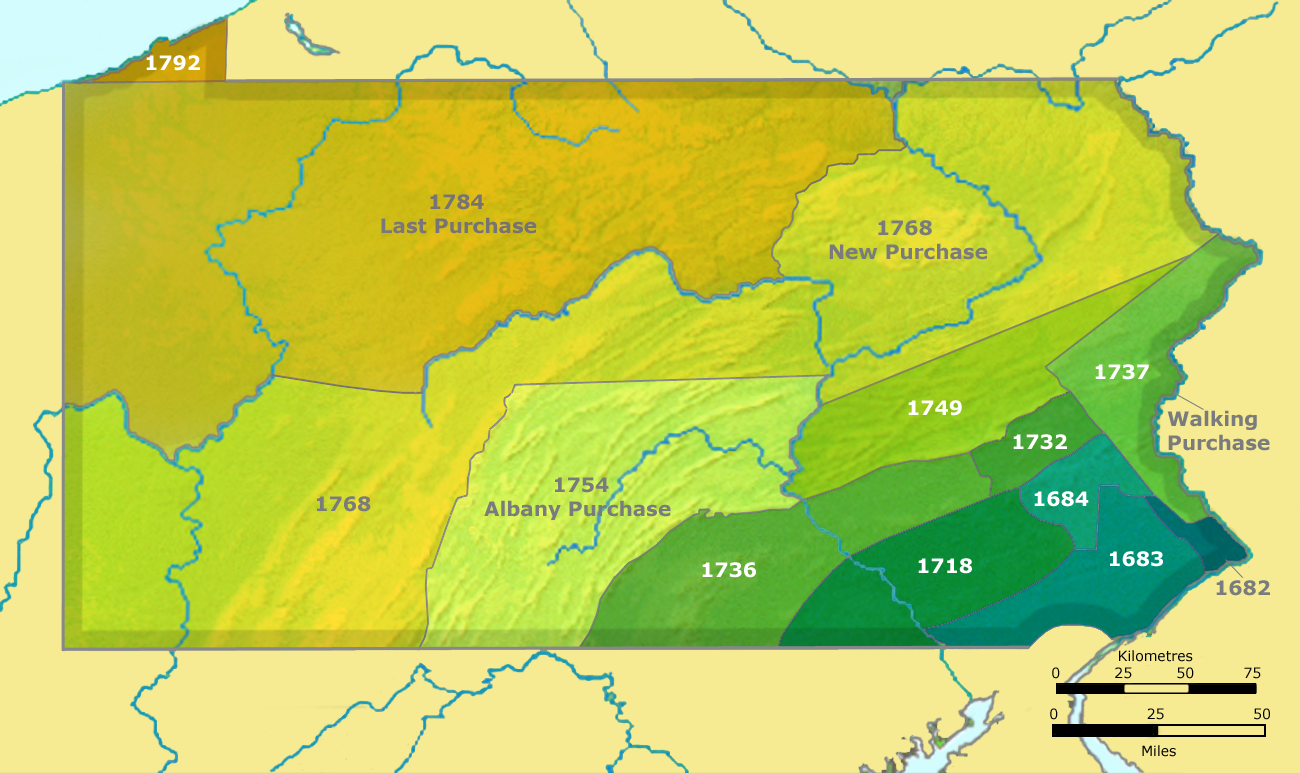
Map showing Pennsylvania and the territory involved in the purchase of 1768.
