= Wicocomico =

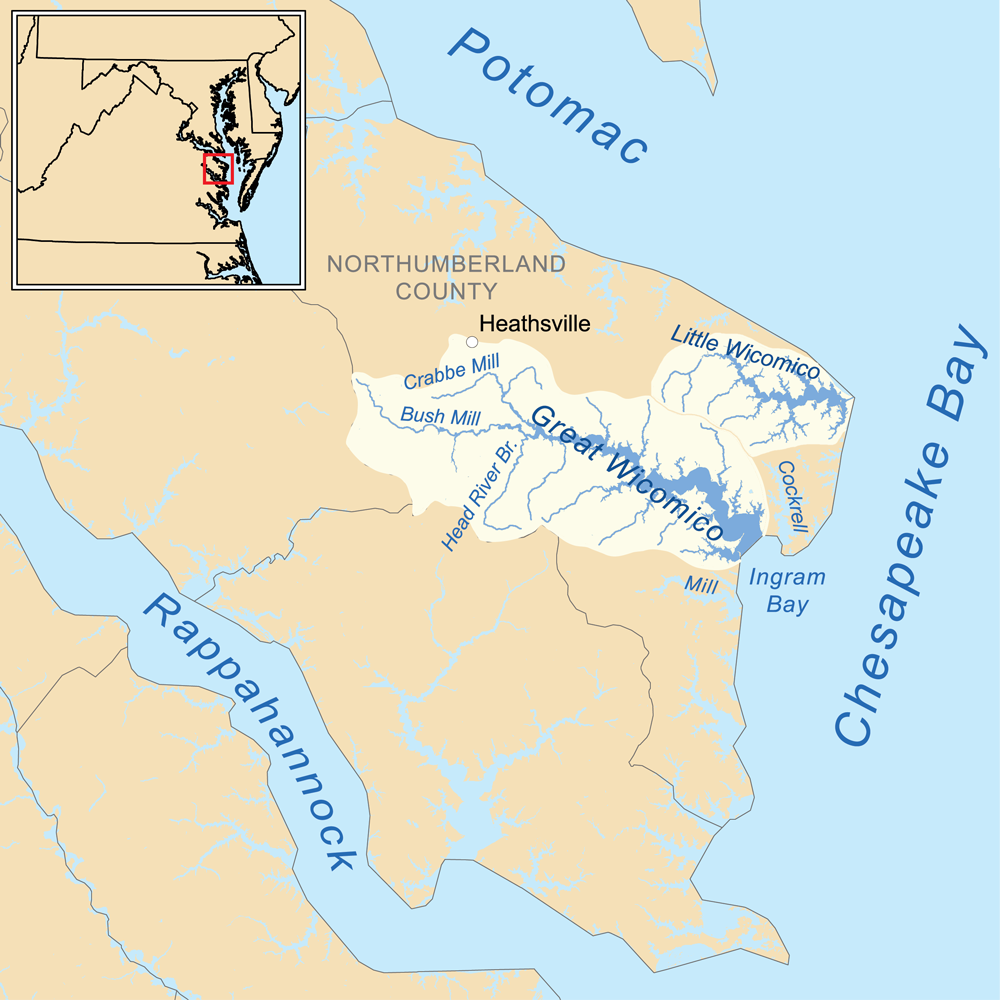
- General region where the Wicocomico lived, at the headwaters and north of the Little Wicomico River

Total population
- Extinct(1719), Modern Revival

Regions with significant populations
- Northumberland County, Virginia

Languages
- English, formerly Virginia Algonquian (Powhatan)

Religion
- Christianity, Native religion

Related ethnic groups
- Nanticoke people, Pocomoke people

The Wicocomico /waɪkɛ'kɑːməkɛ/ also spelled Wicomico or Wicacoan, were an Algonquian-speaking tribe who lived in Northumberland County, Virginia, at the head and slightly north of the Little Wicomico River.

According to John R. Swanton they were a subdivision of the Nanticoke.

They were the first Native people on the mainland to encounter Captain John Smith, before his famous interaction with Pamunkey and Pocahontas of the Powhatan people. Due to constant encroachment and manipulation by settlers, opportunists, and Captain Smith, as well as internal conflict regarding how to respond to these, the tribe splintered. The colonial court of Virginia ordered them to merge with a smaller tribe and renamed the Wicocomico. The English colonists assigned them a flag and a reservation of 4,400 acres (18 km^{2}) near Dividing Creek, south of the Great Wicomico River.

The grandson of Machywap (later called Machywap Taptico, once a friend of John Smith) was forced to sell the last remaining piece of Wicacoan-owned land following the Battle of the Wilderness fought there, because the ground was so littered with bodies. Being a massive "burial" site, the ground could no longer be cultivated. Some of the splintered tribe joined the Powhatan Confederacy, the rest integrated. They were rendered functionally extinct and soon disappeared from the historical record.

== Name ==
Wicocomico is also written Wiccocomoco, Wighcocomoco, Wicomico, Wicomoco (by James Mooney), Wicocomoco (by John Reed Swanton), and Wicacoan. Originally just the name of a single band, the Wicocomico became an umbrella term for survivors of related bands in the 1650s.

== History ==
=== 17th century ===
The Wicocomico people were encountered by Captain John Smith in 1608 as he explored Virginia. He notes a village of about 130 men on the South side of the mouth of the Patawomeke (Potomac) River.

The Northumberland County Court began manipulating and interfering in the governance of the local tribes by the mid-17th century. Sometime between 1652 and 1655, the Court directed the Wicocomico and Chicacoan (or Sekakawons) tribes to merge and relocate slightly south of the Great Wicomico River. They were given 50 acres per fighting man, for a total of 4,400 acres (18 km^{2}) near Dividing Creek. The Lower Cuttatawomen probably merged with them between 1656 and 1659. The merged tribes' adopted the name "Wicocomico" since that group was the most numerous. The court appointed Machywap (formerly the leader of the Chicacoan) as the weroance of the combined tribes, as he had an English wife, was therefore considered a friend of the Smith and his fellow colonists and "easy to manage (manipulate)". By 1659, the frustrations over encroachment from English colonists boiled over, resulting in the combined majority of the tribes of the Wicocomico to depose Machywap, possibly by force, and replace him with Pekwem (a Powhatan confederacy sympathizer without ties to the English colonists) as their weroance.

Colonists' encroachment on their lands created constant problems. From 1660 to 1673, the Wicocomico frequently challenged colonists in court over land disputes. Although most disputes were settled in favor of the Wicocomico, by 1719 they retained only 1,700 acres (6.9 km^{2}) of their original 4,400-acre (18 km^{2}) reservation. In 1705, Robert Beverley, Jr. wrote "In Northumberland, Wiccocomoco, has but three men living, which yet keep up their Kingdom, and retain their Fashion; they live by themselves, separate from all other Indians, and from the English."

=== 18th century ===
After June 1719 and the death of William Taptico, the last Wicocomico weroance, the colonial government confiscated the lands by force. The remnants of the Wicocomico dispersed, and the tribe has been considered extinct. In 1730, the Tobacco Inspection Act of 1730 declared that one of the public tobacco warehouses should be "At Wiccocomico, at Robert Jones's; and at Coan, at the warehouses in Northumberland, under one inspection."

== Cultural heritage group ==
An organization that self-identifies as a Native American tribe, the Wicocomico Indian Nation claims descent from the Wicocomico petitioned for federal recognition in 2000. The organization is not federally recognized nor state-recognized as a Native American tribe.
