= Little Wicomico River =

River in the United States

Coordinates: 37.89013°N 76.23633°W

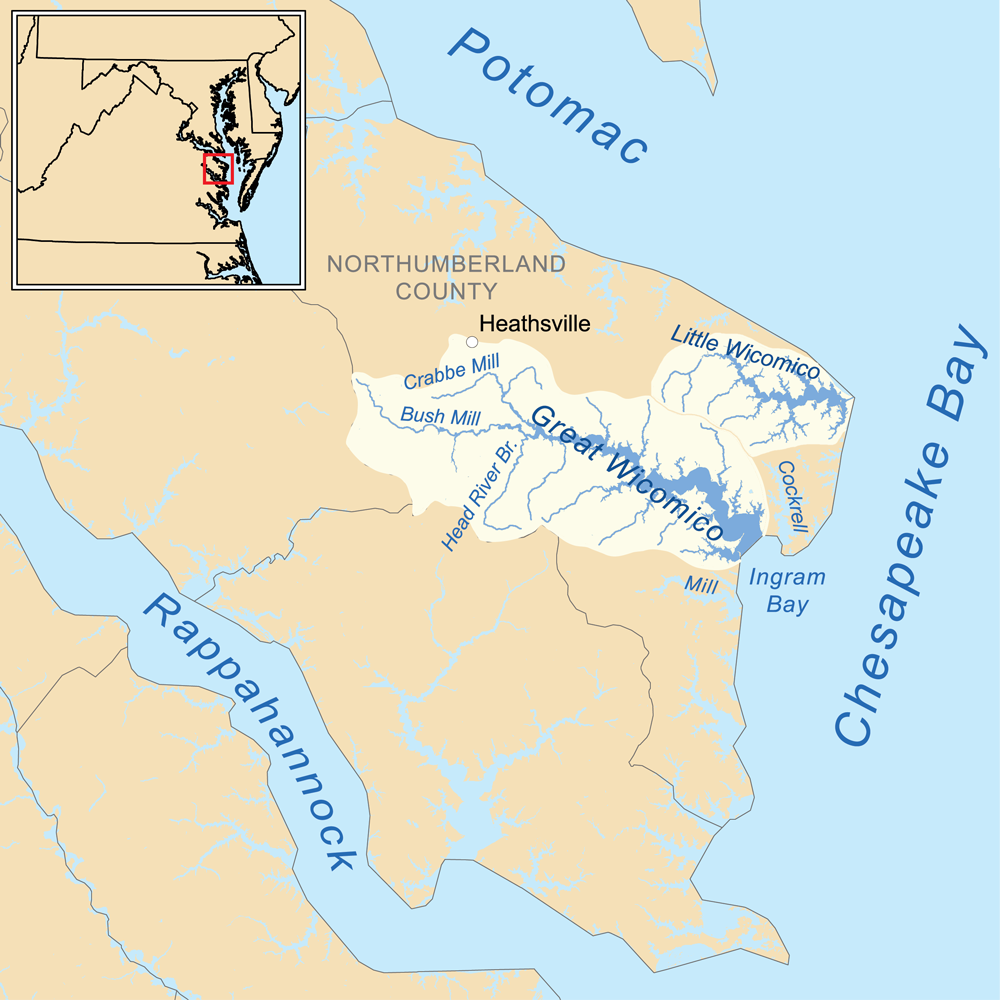

Location
- Country: United States

Physical characteristics
- Source
  - location: Virginia

The Little Wicomico River is a 9-mile-long (14 km) river in the United States state of Virginia. The river, mostly tidal, flows into the Chesapeake Bay at the junction of the south shore of the Potomac River, which is also the Maryland-Virginia boundary, with the Chesapeake Bay.

== See also ==
- List of rivers of Virginia
