= Treaty of Lochaber =

1770 treaty between Great Britain and the Cherokee

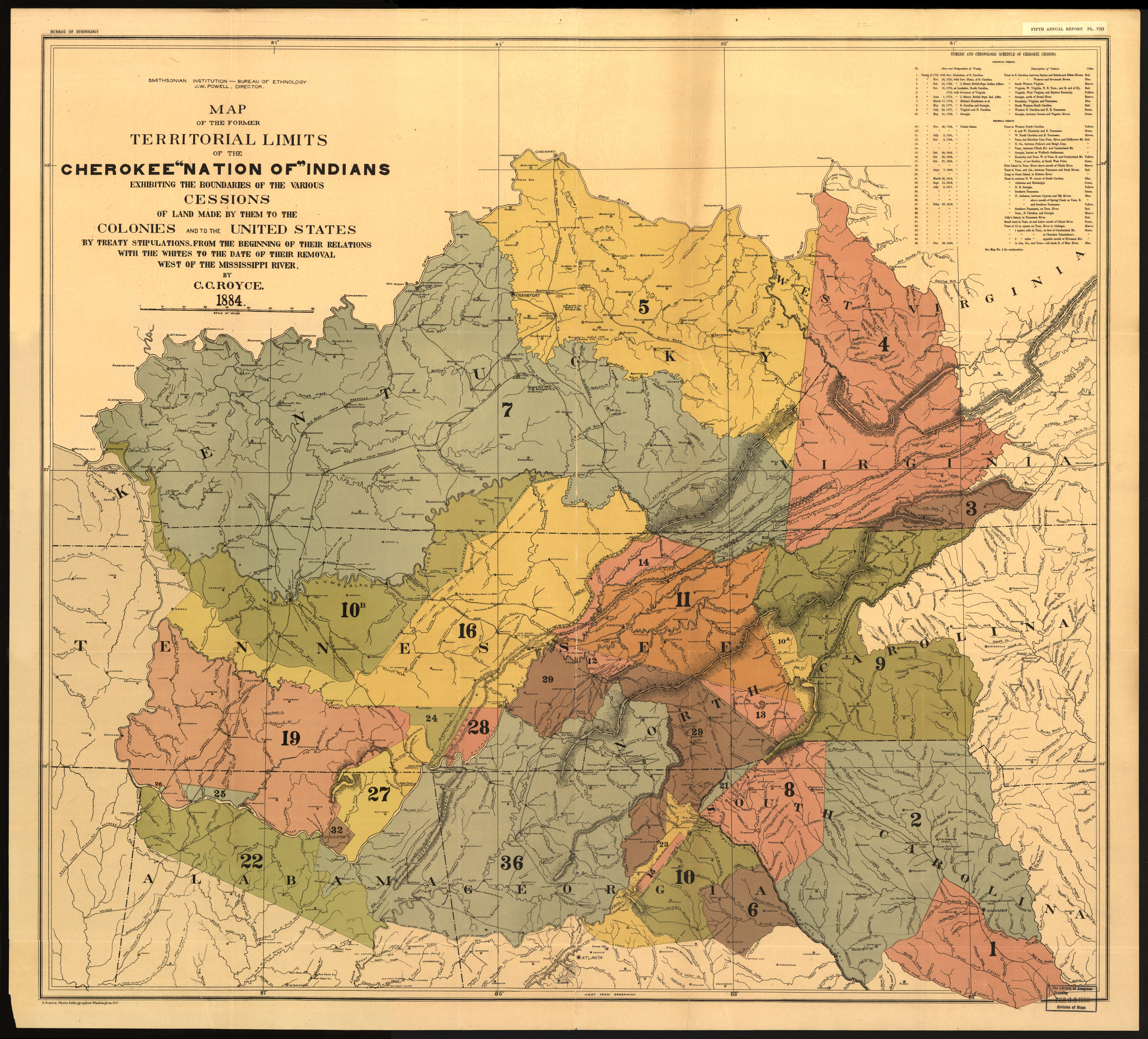
Land cession of 1770 (№4)

The Treaty of Lochaber was signed in the Province of South Carolina on 18 October 1770 by the British Indian Department official John Stuart and the Cherokee, fixing the boundary for the western limit of the frontier settlements of the British colonies of Virginia and North Carolina.

Southern Secretary Lord Shelburne was determined to settle disputes along the western frontier in order to avoid more conflict between Anglo-American colonists and Native Americans. Although he lost his office as Southern Secretary in October 1768, negotiations progressed with tribal chiefs (usually representing towns in their decentralized society) regarding the North American colonial frontier. The Treaty of Fort Stanwix in November 1768 fixed the boundary lines between tribes and colonists to the north of Virginia. The border variances from the Treaty of Hard Labour led to negotiations where 1000 Cherokee leaders were hosted by Alexander Cameron (d. 1781) at Lochabar Plantation in Ninety-Six District, South Carolina.

Based on the terms of the accord, the Cherokee relinquished all claims to land from the previous North Carolina and Virginia border to a point six miles east of Long Island of the Holston River in present-day Kingsport, Tennessee, to the mouth of the Kanawha River at present-day Point Pleasant, West Virginia, in Mason County. The North Carolina-Virginia border at this time was along the 36° 30' parallel in present-day Tennessee, because both colonies believed their charters extended to the west. In this treaty, the Cherokee surrendered their rights to most land in present-day southern West Virginia not included in the Treaty of Hard Labour in October 1768.

== Donelson's Indian Line ==
A subsequent survey of the Treaty line by John Donelson of Virginia in 1771 placed the northern terminus of the line at the mouth of the Kentucky River, substantially west of the Kanawha River, cleaving what is today extreme western Virginia, a wedge of western Virginia and a large part of northeastern Kentucky to Virginia colony, which lands were then part of newly organized trans-Appalachian Virginia's Botetourt County extending to the Mississippi River. The survey also moved the southern line from the North Carolina (today Tennessee) boundary south to the Holston River because settlers didn't know how to locate the North Carolina boundary without landmarks. This left three settlements, at Watauga, Nolichucky and Carter's Valley south of the surveyed line, hence in Cherokee land and not authorized by either the Crown or the Cherokee. These would later become separate purchases from the Cherokee and land grants from North Carolina during the organization of the Transylvania Colony in 1775.
