= Treaty of Fort Stanwix (1768) =

Treaty between Great Britain and the Haudenosaunee people

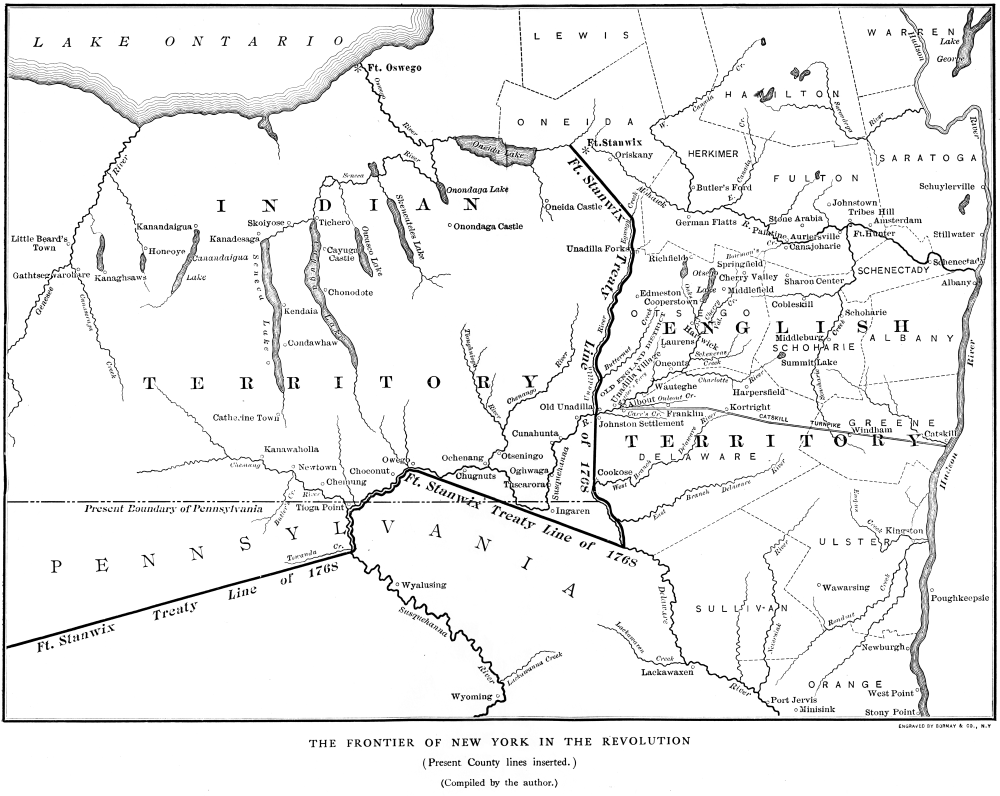
- A portion of the 1768 Fort Stanwix Treaty line, showing the boundary in New York
- Type: Land boundaries
- Signed: 5 November 1768
- Location: near modern-day Rome, New York
- Signatories: Sir William Johnson
- Parties: Great Britain: New Jersey; Virginia; Pennsylvania Haudenosaunee
- Language: English

The Treaty of Fort Stanwix was a treaty signed between representatives from the Haudenosaunee and Great Britain (accompanied by negotiators from New Jersey, Virginia and Pennsylvania) in 1768 at Fort Stanwix. It was negotiated between Sir William Johnson, his deputy George Croghan, and representatives of the Haudenosaunee.

The treaty established a Line of Property following the Ohio River that ceded the Kentucky portion of the Virginia Colony to the British Crown, as well as most of what is now West Virginia. The treaty also settled land claims between the Haudenosaunee and the Penn family; the lands acquired by American colonists in Pennsylvania were known as the New Purchase.

== Treaty ==
The purpose of the conference was to adjust the boundary line between Indian lands and the Thirteen Colonies outlined in the Royal Proclamation of 1763. The British government hoped a new boundary line might bring an end to the rampant frontier violence between Native Americans and American colonists. Native Americans hoped a new, permanent line might prevent further encroachment of their lands from the colonists.

The final treaty was signed on November 5 with one signatory for each of the Six Nations and in the presence of representatives from the colonies of New Jersey, Virginia and Pennsylvania as well as Johnson. The Native American nations present received gifts and cash totaling £10,460 7s. 3d. sterling, the highest payment ever made from the British Crown to Native Americans. The treaty established a Line of Property which extended the earlier proclamation line of the Alleghenies (the divide between the Ohio and coastal watersheds), much farther to the west. The line ran near Fort Pitt and followed the Ohio River as far as the Tennessee River, effectively ceding the Kentucky portion of the Virginia Colony to the Crown, as well as most of what is now West Virginia. The British government had recently confirmed ownership of the lands south and west of the Kanawha to the Cherokee by the Treaty of Hard Labour. During the Fort Stanwix proceedings, the British negotiators were astonished to learn that the Six Nations still maintained a nominal claim over much of Kentucky, which they wanted added into consideration. In addition, the Shawnee did not agree to this treaty, contesting colonial Virginian settlements between the Alleghenies and Ohio until the 1774 Treaty of Camp Charlotte.

Although the Six Nations of New York had previously recognized colonial rights southeast of the Ohio River at the 1752 Treaty of Logstown, they continued to claim ownership (by conquest) over all land as far south as the Tennessee River. They had reserved this territory for decades as a hunting ground. They still considered Tennessee their boundary with the Cherokee and other "Southern" tribes. Although representatives of the Indian nations who occupied these lands, primarily the Shawnee and Lenape, were present at the negotiations in 1768, they were not signatories. They had no fundamental role in the Haudenosaunee's sale of their homeland. The Haudenosaunee hoped that they could take pressure off their home territories in the New York and Pennsylvania areas by releasing Ohio lands. Rather than secure peace, the Fort Stanwix treaty helped set the stage for the next round of hostilities between Native Americans and American colonists along the Ohio River, which would culminate in Dunmore's War.

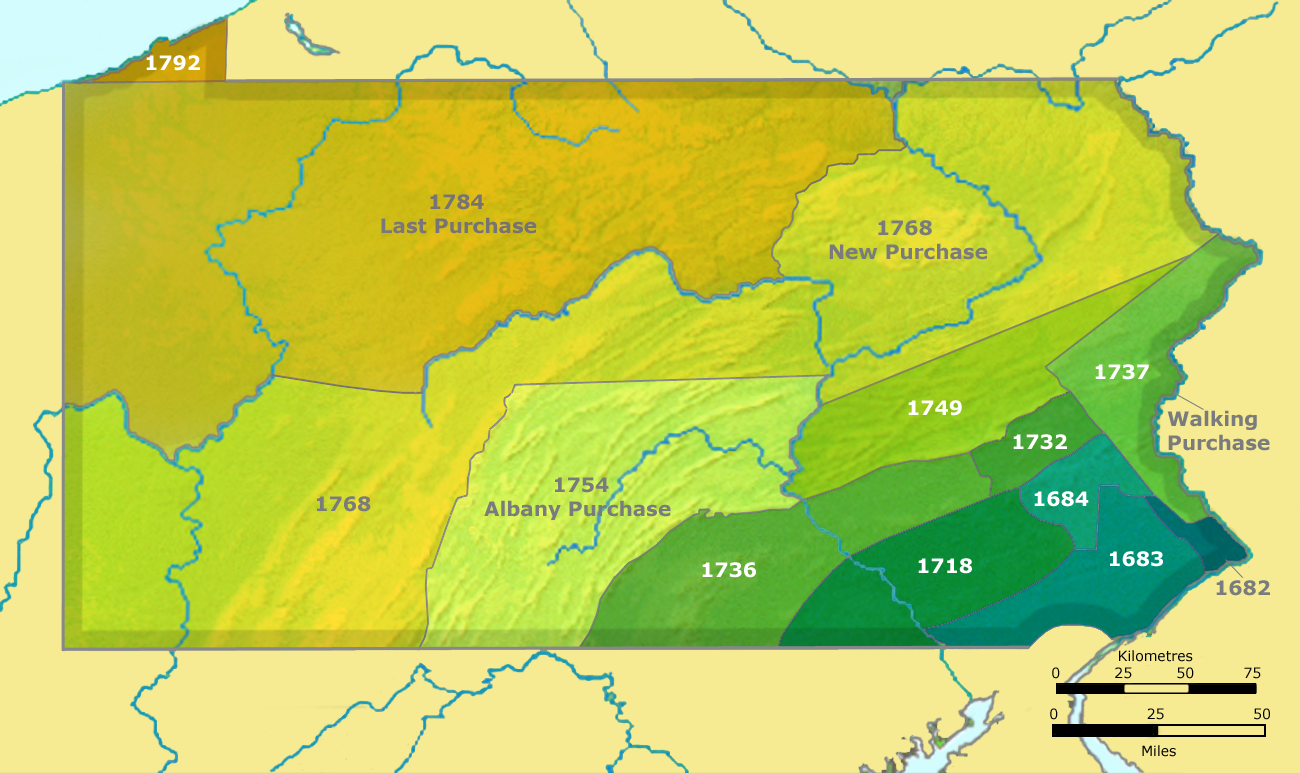
A map showing the "New Purchase" of 1768 in Pennsylvania

The treaty also settled land claims between the Six Nations and the Penn family, the proprietors of Pennsylvania, where the lands acquired in 1768 were referred to as the "New Purchase". Due to disputes about the physical boundaries of the settlement, however, the final treaty line would not be fully agreed upon for another five years. The final portion of the Line of Property in Pennsylvania, called the Purchase line in the State, was fixed in 1773 by representatives from the Six Nations and Pennsylvania who met at a spot called Canoe Place at the confluence of West Branch of the Susquehanna River and Cush Cushion Creek in what is now Cherry Tree, Pennsylvania.

American settlers pushing westward and opportunities for economic development turned the attention of investors and land speculators to the area west of the Appalachians. In response to demands by settlers and speculators, colonial authorities sought further land cessions from the Haudenosaunee and Cherokee. The Treaty of Lochaber with the Cherokee followed in 1770, adjusting boundaries established in the Treaty of Hard Labour, whereby the Cherokee withdrew their claim to parts of the same country, encompassing the south part of present-day West Virginia.

== See also ==
- Vandalia (colony)
