= Royal Proclamation of 1763 =

British declaration outlining government for North American colonies

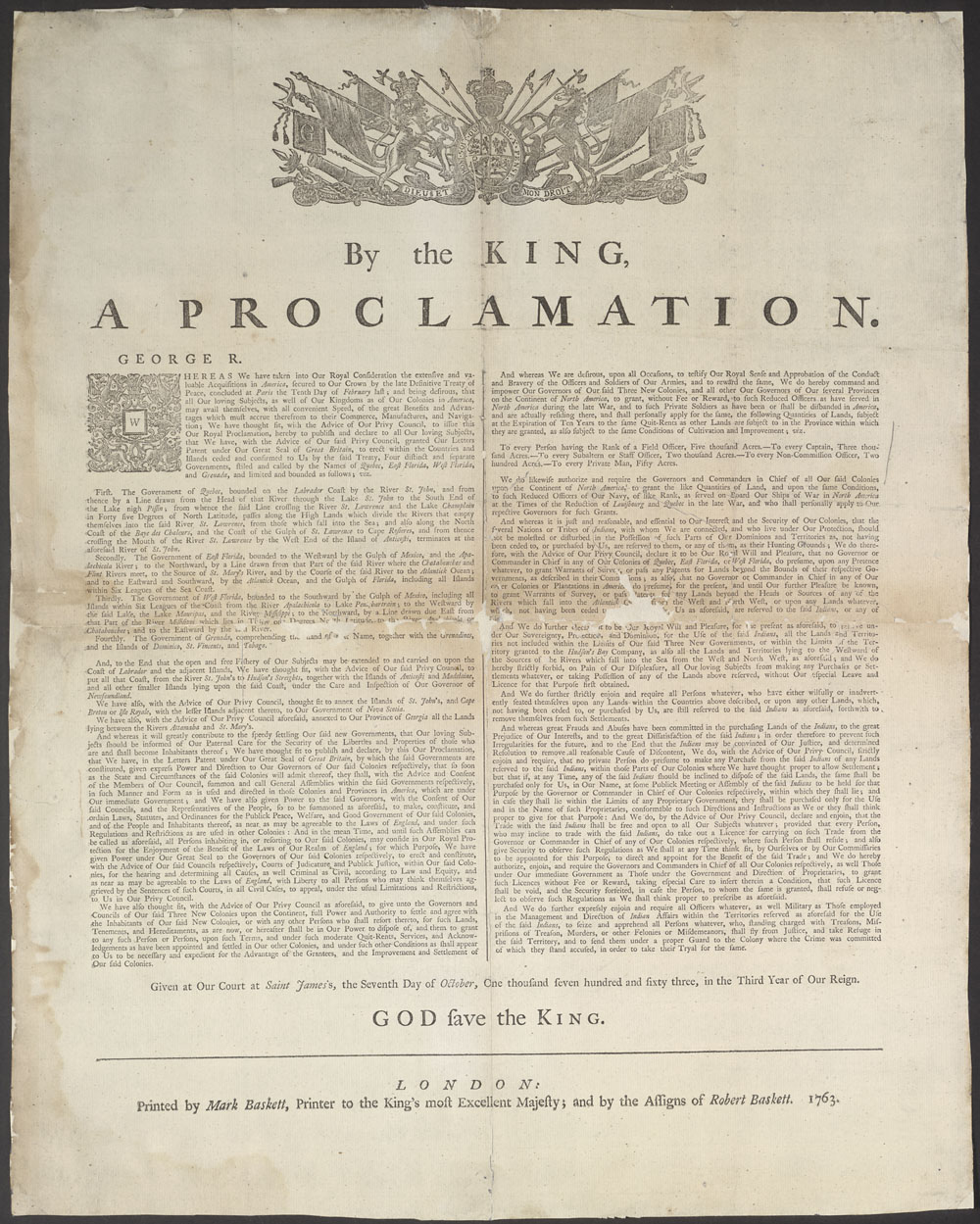
The Royal Proclamation of 1763, Library and Archives Canada

A portion of eastern North America; the 1763 "proclamation line" is the border between the red and the pink areas

The Royal Proclamation of 1763 was issued by King George III of Great Britain on 7 October 1763. It followed the Treaty of Paris (1763), which formally ended the Seven Years' War and transferred French territory in North America to Great Britain. The proclamation at least temporarily forbade all new settlements west of a line drawn along the Appalachian Mountains, which was delineated as an Indian Reserve.

Exclusion from the vast region of Trans-Appalachia created discontent between Britain and colonial land speculators and potential settlers. The proclamation and access to western lands was one of the first significant areas of dispute between Britain and the Thirteen Colonies and became a contributing factor leading to the American Revolution.

The 1763 proclamation line is more or less similar to the Eastern Continental Divide, extending from Georgia in the south to the divide's northern terminus near the middle of the north border of Pennsylvania, where it intersects the northeasterly St. Lawrence Divide, and extends further through New England.

The Royal Proclamation continues to be of legal importance to First Nations in Canada, being the first legal recognition of aboriginal title, rights and freedoms. It is recognized in the Constitution Act, 1982, partly due to direct action by Indigenous peoples of Canada, known as the Constitution Express movement of 1980–1982.

== Background: Treaty of Paris ==
The Seven Years' War and its North American theater, the French and Indian War, ended with the 1763 Treaty of Paris. Under the treaty, all French colonial territory west of the Mississippi River was ceded to Spain. In contrast, all French colonial territory east of the Mississippi River and south of Rupert's Land (save Saint Pierre and Miquelon, which France kept) was ceded to Great Britain. Both Spain and Britain received some French islands in the Caribbean, while France kept Haiti and Guadeloupe.

== Provisions ==
=== New colonies ===
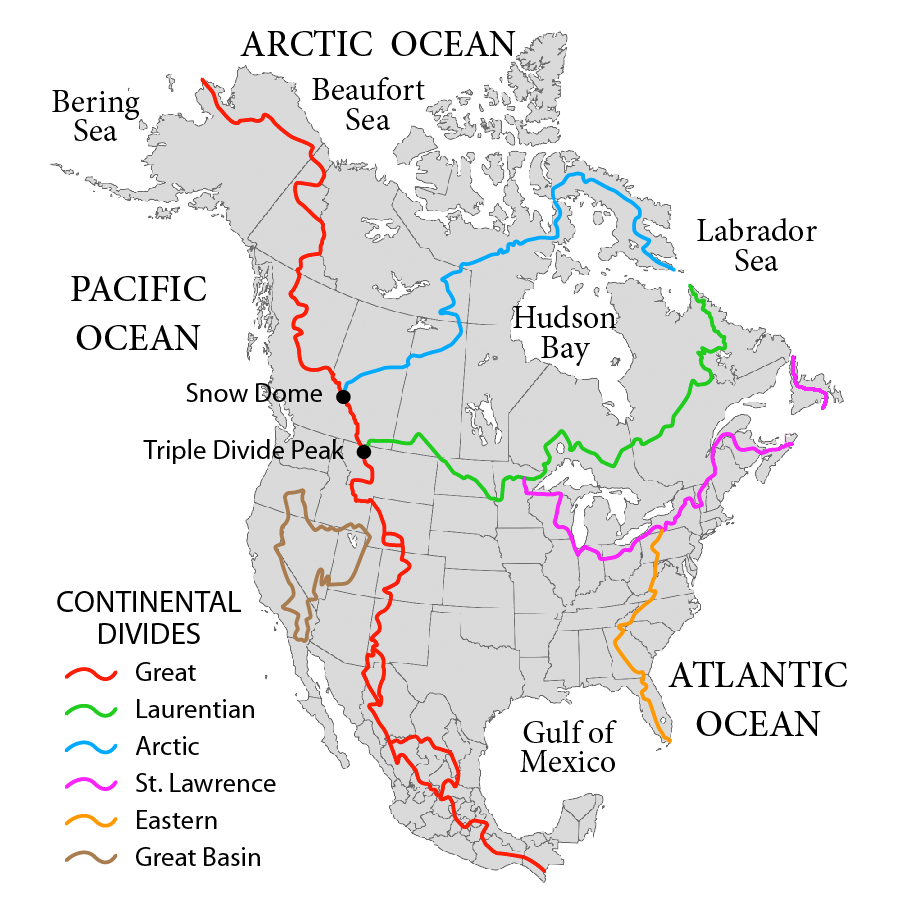
The Eastern watershed boundary in the southern areas (orange line) and the St. Lawrence watershed boundary in the northern regions (magenta line) of this map more or less defined the Royal Proclamation's western boundaries

The Proclamation of 1763 dealt with managing former French territories in North America that Britain acquired following its victory over France in the French and Indian War and regulating colonial settlers' expansion. It established new governments for several areas: the province of Quebec, the new colonies of West Florida and East Florida, and a group of Caribbean islands, Grenada, Tobago, Saint Vincent, and Dominica, collectively referred to as the British Ceded Islands.

== Proclamation line ==
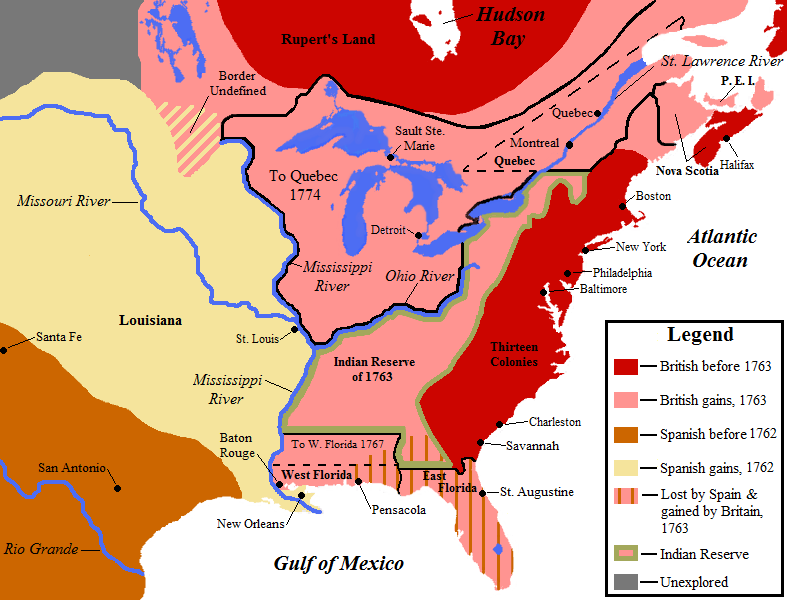
New borders drawn by the Royal Proclamation of 1763

At the outset, the Royal Proclamation of 1763 defined the jurisdictional limits of the British territories of North America, limiting British colonial expansion on the continent. What remained of the Royal Province of New France east of the Great Lakes and the Ottawa River, and south of Rupert's Land, was revised under the name "Quebec". The territory northeast of the St. John River on the Labrador coast was reassigned to the Newfoundland Colony. The lands west of Quebec and west of a line running along the crest of the Allegheny Mountains became (British) Indian Territory, barred to settlement from colonies east of the line.

The proclamation line was not intended to be a permanent boundary between the colonists and Native American lands but rather a temporary boundary that could be extended further west in an orderly, lawful manner. It was also not designed as an uncrossable boundary; people could cross the line, but not settle past it. Its contour was defined by the headwaters that formed the watershed along the Appalachians. All land with rivers that flowed into the Atlantic was designated for the colonial entities. In contrast, all the land with rivers that flowed into the Mississippi was reserved for the Native American populations. The proclamation outlawed the private purchase of Native American land, which had often created problems. Instead, all future land purchases were to be made by Crown officials "at some public Meeting or Assembly of the said Indians". British colonials were forbidden to settle on native lands, and colonial officials were forbidden to grant ground or lands without royal approval. Organized land companies asked for land grants, but were denied by King George III.

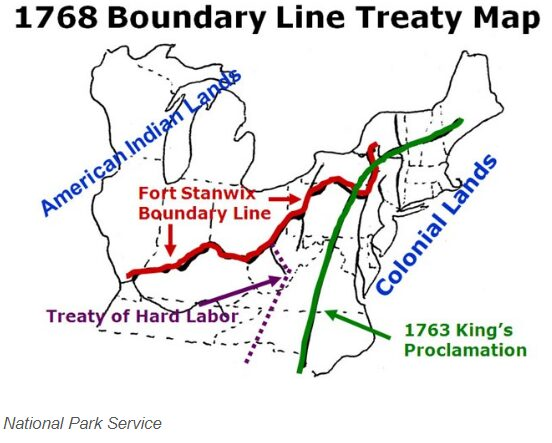
The Boundary Line Map of 1768 moved the boundary west

British colonists and land speculators objected to the proclamation boundary since the British government had already assigned land grants to them. This included the wealthy owners of the Ohio Company, who protested the line to the governor of Virginia, as they had plans to settle the land to grow their business. Many settlements already existed beyond the proclamation line, some of which had been temporarily evacuated during Pontiac's War, and there were many already granted land claims yet to be settled. For example, George Washington and his Virginia soldiers had been granted lands past the boundary. Prominent American colonials joined with the land speculators in Britain to lobby the government to move the line further west.

The colonists' demands were met and the boundary line was adjusted in a series of treaties with the Native Americans. The first two of these treaties were completed in 1768; the Treaty of Fort Stanwix adjusted the border with the Iroquois Confederacy in the Ohio Country and the Treaty of Hard Labour adjusted the border with the Cherokee in the Carolinas. The Treaty of Hard Labour was followed by the Treaty of Lochaber in 1770, adjusting the border between Virginia and the Cherokee. These agreements opened much of what is now Kentucky and West Virginia to British settlement. The land granted by the Virginian and North Carolinian government heavily favored the land companies, seeing as they had more wealthy backers than the poorer settlers who wanted to settle west in hopes of gaining a fortune.

== Response from colonists ==
Many colonists disregarded the proclamation line and settled west, which created tension between them and the Native Americans. Pontiac's Rebellion (1763–1766) was a war involving Native American tribes, primarily from the Great Lakes region, the Illinois Country and the Ohio Country, who were dissatisfied with British postwar policies in the Great Lakes region after the end of the Seven Years' War. They took over a large number of the forts which commanded the waterways involved in trade within the region and export to Great Britain. The proclamation line had been conceived before the onset of Pontiac's Rebellion, but the outbreak of this conflict hastened the process of making it law. Despite efforts to restrict westward expansion colonists continued to cross the boundary. In 1769 Daniel Boone crossed the Appalachian boundary line to hunt and explore deep into Kentucky. Similarly, in 1774, James Harrod led an unauthorized group of 31 frontiersmen to found Harrodstown (now Harrodsburg), establishing the first permanent Anglo-American settlement west of the Alleghenies.

== Legacy ==
=== Indigenous peoples ===
The Royal Proclamation continued to govern the cession of Indigenous land in British North America, especially Upper Canada and Rupert's Land. Upper Canada created a platform for treaty-making based on the Royal Proclamation. After loyalists moved into land after Britain's defeat in the American Revolution, the first impetus was created out of necessity.

According to historian Colin Calloway, "scholars disagree on whether the proclamation recognized or undermined tribal sovereignty".

Some see the Royal Proclamation of 1763 as a "fundamental document" for First Nations land claims and self-government. It is "the first legal recognition by the British Crown of Aboriginal rights" and imposes a fiduciary duty of care on the Crown. The intent and promises made to the natives in the proclamation have been argued to be temporary, only meant to appease the Native peoples who were becoming increasingly resentful of "settler encroachments on their lands" and were capable of becoming a serious threat to British colonial settlement. Advice given by a Sir William Johnson, superintendent of Indian Affairs in North America, to the Board of Trade on 30 August 1764, expressed that:

The Indians all know we cannot be a Match for them in the midst of an extensive woody Country ... from whence I infer that if we are determined to possess Our Posts, Trade & ca securely, it cannot be done for a Century by any other means than that of purchasing the favour of the numerous Indian inhabitants.

Anishinaabe jurist John Borrows has written that "the Proclamation illustrates the British government's attempt to exercise sovereignty over First Nations while simultaneously trying to convince First Nations that they would remain separate from European settlers and have their jurisdiction preserved." Borrows further writes that the Royal Proclamation along with the subsequent Treaty of Niagara, provide for an argument that "discredits the claims of the Crown to exercise sovereignty over First Nations" and affirms Aboriginal "powers of self-determination in, among other things, allocating lands".

==== Australian indigenous land tenure ====
Australian jurisprudence on indigenous land tenure has been influenced by the proclamation. The landmark Mabo v Queensland (No 2) decision noted the proclamation as an early precedent acknowledging the sanctity of treaties with indigenous peoples.

=== Johnson v. McIntosh ===
The functional content of the proclamation was reintroduced into American law by the decision of the U.S. Supreme Court in Johnson v. McIntosh (1823).

=== 250th anniversary celebrations ===
In October 2013, the 250th anniversary of the Royal Proclamation was celebrated in Ottawa with a meeting of Indigenous leaders and Governor-General David Johnston. The Aboriginal movement Idle No More held birthday parties for the document at various locations across Canada.

== United States ==
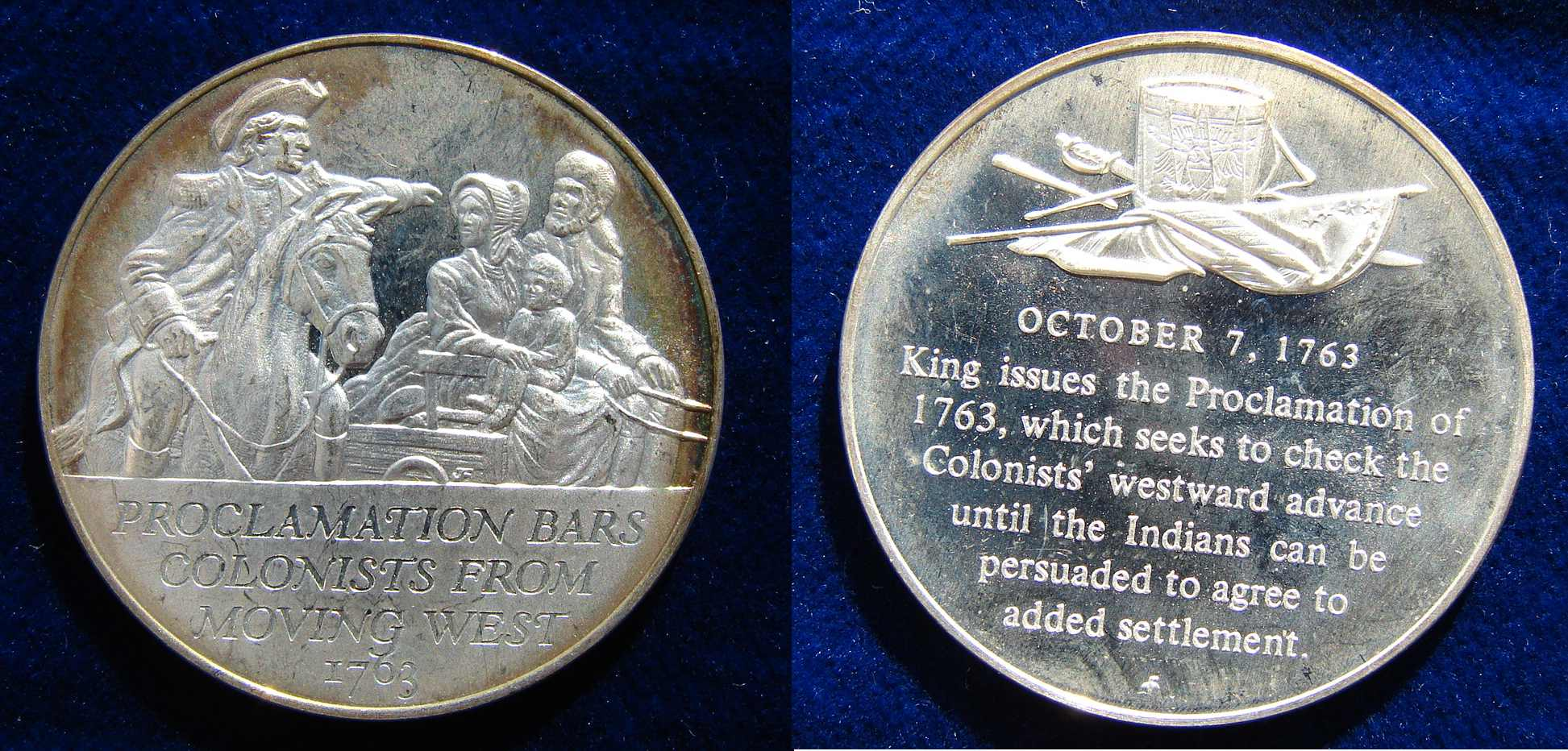
USA Proclamation of 1763 Silver Medal: Franklin Mint Issue 1970

The influence of the Royal Proclamation of 1763 on the coming of the American Revolution has been variously interpreted. Many historians argue that the proclamation ceased to be a significant source of tension after 1768 since the aforementioned later treaties opened up extensive lands for settlement. Others have argued that colonial resentment of the proclamation contributed to the growing divide between the colonies and the mother country. Some historians say that even though the boundary was pushed west in subsequent treaties, the British government refused to permit new colonial settlements for fear of instigating a war with Native Americans, which angered colonial land speculators. Others argue that the Royal Proclamation imposed a fiduciary duty of care on the Crown.

George Washington was given 20,000 acres (81 km^{2}) of land in the Ohio region for his services in the French and Indian War. In a 1767 letter to surveyor William Crawford he openly “look[ed] upon that Proclamation in any other light … than as a temporary expedient to quiet the minds of the Indians.” In 1770, Washington took the lead in securing the rights of himself and his old soldiers in the French War, advancing money to pay expenses for the common cause and using his influence in the proper quarters. In August 1770, it was decided that Washington should personally make a trip to the western region, where he located and surveyed tracts for himself and military comrades. After some dispute, he was eventually granted a patent letter for tracts of land there. The lands involved were open to Virginians under terms of the Treaty of Lochaber of 1770, except for the lands located two miles (3.2 km) south of Fort Pitt, now known as Pittsburgh.

In the United States, the Royal Proclamation of 1763 ended with the American Revolutionary War because Great Britain ceded the land in question to the United States in the Treaty of Paris (1783). Afterward, the U.S. government faced difficulties preventing frontier violence and eventually adopted policies similar to the Royal Proclamation. The first in a series of Indian Intercourse Acts was passed in 1790, prohibiting unregulated trade and travel in Native American lands. In 1823, the U.S. Supreme Court case Johnson v. McIntosh established that only the U.S. government, and not private individuals, could purchase land from Native Americans.

== See also ==
- Halifax Treaties
- Indian removal
- Indian barrier state
- Indian Reserve (1763)
- Northwest Territory
- Territorial evolution of the Caribbean

== General and cited sources ==
- Abernethy, Thomas Perkins (1959) [1937]. Western Lands and the American Revolution. New York: Russell & Russell.
- Borrows, John (1997). "Wampum at Niagara: The Royal Proclamation, Canadian Legal History, and Self-Government" (PDF). In Michael Asch (ed.). Aboriginal and Treaty Rights in Canada. Vancouver: UBC Press. ISBN 0-7748-0580-3. Archived from the original (PDF) on 23 May 2011. – Also Aboriginal and Treaty Rights in Canada, p. 155, at Google Books
- Calloway, Colin G. (2007). The Scratch of a Pen: 1763 and the Transformation of North America. Oxford University Press. ISBN 978-0-19-533127-1.
- Holton, Woody (1999). "Land Speculators versus Indians and the Privy Council". Forced Founders: Indians, Debtors, Slaves, and the Making of the American Revolution in Virginia. UNC Press Books. pp. 3–38. ISBN 978-0-8078-9986-1.
