= Treaty of Hard Labour =

1768 treaty between Great Britain and the Cherokee

Treaty of Hard Labour is one of the two treaties signed by the British representative John Stuart with the Cherokee tribe. In an effort to resolve concerns of settlers and land speculators following the western boundary established by the Royal Proclamation of 1763 by King George III, it was desired to move the boundary farther west to encompass more settlers who were outside of the boundary. The two treaties that resulted to address this issue were the Treaty of Hard Labour and the Treaty of Fort Stanwix. On October 17, 1768, British representative John Stuart signed the Treaty of Hard Labour with the Cherokee tribe, relinquishing all Cherokee claims to the land west of the Allegheny Mountains and east of the Ohio River, comprising all of present-day West Virginia except the extreme southwestern part of the state. The resulting boundary line ran from the confluence of the Ohio and Kanawha Rivers, to the headwaters of the Kanawha River, then south to East Florida. The treaty is named after Hard Labor, South Carolina, where it was signed.

The following month, the Treaty of Fort Stanwix was signed with the Iroquois which resulted in a different boundary line that followed the Ohio River to its confluence with the Tennessee River. This conflicted with the line set by the Treaty of Hard Labour by moving the Cherokees' bounds further west. In 1770, the Treaty of Lochaber redrew the line originally set by the Treaty of Hard Labour.
