= List of Airwolf episodes =

The cover of the first season DVD boxset released by Universal Studios; the characters featured are Michael Coldsmith-Briggs III ("Archangel") (left), Dominic Santini (middle) and Stringfellow Hawke (right)

Airwolf, an action-espionage television series created by Donald P. Bellisario, premiered on January 22, 1984 on CBS in the United States and ended on August 8, 1987. The show spans four seasons and 80 episodes in total. The original pilot is two hours long (split into two episodes for syndication), while the episodes that followed are approximately 45 minutes long. An enhanced version of the first episode was released as a motion picture in several countries as well as on home video. The show aired for three seasons on CBS; it was later picked up by USA Network for a final season, made on a much smaller budget.

Three seasons of Airwolf were released on DVD in United States between 2005 and 2007, respectively. The fourth season was released in 2011. The original series was canceled due to declining ratings; the resurrected fourth season was not renewed due to poor viewing figures as well as being generally poorly received.

Airwolf follows Stringfellow Hawke, a pilot who has to retrieve the helicopter named Airwolf from the hands of its creator Dr. Moffet with the help from his friends, while going through a series of adventures. The original series starred Jan-Michael Vincent as Hawke, Ernest Borgnine as Dominic Santini, Alex Cord as Archangel and Jean Bruce Scott as Caitlin O’Shannessy. The cast of season four consisted of Barry Van Dyke as St. John Hawke, Michele Scarabelli as Jo Santini, Geraint Wyn Davies as Mike Rivers, and Anthony Sherwood as Jason Locke.

== Series overview ==
Season	Episodes	Originally released		
Season	Episodes	First released	Last released	Network
1	12	January 22, 1984	April 14, 1984	CBS
2	22	September 22, 1984	April 13, 1985	CBS
3	22	September 28, 1985	March 29, 1986	CBS
4	24	January 23, 1987	August 7, 1987	USA

== Episodes ==
=== Season 1 (1984) ===
The series premiered after Super Bowl XVIII on January 22, 1984 with a two-hour pilot episode, and concluded on April 14, 1984, with 11 episodes aired. It began with Stringfellow Hawke hunting down Dr. Moffet and bringing Airwolf back into his protection, which Hawke would then use to go on flying missions of national importance for the F.I.R.M., the company that has the task of recovering Hawke's brother St. John Hawke.

No. overall	No. in season	Title	Directed by	Written by	Original release date	Prod. code
1	1	"Shadow of the Hawke"	Donald P. Bellisario	Donald P. Bellisario	January 22, 1984	58275
2	2	"Shadow of the Hawke"	Donald P. Bellisario	Donald P. Bellisario	January 22, 1984	58276
The brilliant, yet sociopathic engineer Dr. Moffet (David Hemmings), builds the advanced attack helicopter Airwolf for the F.I.R.M., a covert agency of American intelligence, pronounced in informal conversation as The Firm. During the initial test flight, Moffet attacks the testing facility, Red Star Control, steals his creation and takes it to Libya having deleted the blueprints from the F.I.R.M. computers. To get it back, F.I.R.M. operative Archangel, who was injured during the attack, tries to recruit ace helicopter pilot Stringfellow Hawke, who now lives as a recluse in a log cabin after the disappearance of his brother St. John in Vietnam. Hawke falls for Gabrielle Ademaur (Belinda Bauer), one of Archangel's associates, who encourages him to take the mission. Hawke accepts, but only if The F.I.R.M. hands over their classified information on the whereabouts of his missing brother. Hawke and his close friend and mentor, Dominic Santini, run the mission to take back Airwolf, discovering Moffet has used it to destroy American targets for the Libyans, and they will not give up their new toy so easily. Eventually they secure the helicopter and Hawke fulfills his part of the deal, but The F.I.R.M. is not forthcoming with his brother's information. Unsatisfied, Hawke hides Airwolf in an extinct desert volcano and becomes custodian of the aircraft, vowing not to hand it over until The F.I.R.M. finds his brother.: Note: Originally shown as a feature-length pilot TV movie, which was later cut into two separate episodes for syndication.
3	3	"Daddy's Gone a Hunt'n"	Virgil Vogel	Burton Armus	January 28, 1984	58208
Hawke is given the assignment of finding a test pilot who is about to steal a fighter aircraft to fly it to Russia. Hawke discovers the pilot is an old Vietnam War buddy who would steal the plane as exchange for the return of his half-Vietnamese son (Chad Allen). After the war the boy grew up on the streets of Saigon. He was captured and was being held as a bargaining chip for the plane. James Whitmore, Jr. guest stars as Major Sam Roper.: Original airing of the episode included an alternate music track used for the aerial battle before being replaced by an orchestral score. This music track is available for listening on Airwolf Extended Theme 2-CD Album, Track 04.
4	4	"Bite of the Jackal"	Alan J. Levi	Nicholas Corea	February 4, 1984	58205
While on a job assignment to Acapulco, Mexico (and unknowingly carrying a young stowaway portrayed by a young Shannen Doherty), Santini's helicopter is sabotaged and crashes in a desolate mountain area. Archangel discovers the man behind the bombing is a rival agent who wants to topple Archangel's position at The F.I.R.M. and is using Santini as bait to capture Airwolf.
5	5	"Proof Through the Night"	Harvey Laidman	Clyde Ware	February 11, 1984	58207
Archangel sends Hawke and Santini to help a F.I.R.M. double-agent escape the Soviet Union. The agent is in possession of a neurotoxin developed by Russian scientists that is valuable to the F.I.R.M. The mission is complicated by the fact that the agent has refused to leave without his wife and daughter. Airwolf 's fuel consumption rates mean that she cannot cover the requisite distance with the "extra weight" of three passengers, so Hawke and Santini must make up the difference by removing the weapons systems, leaving the helicopter unarmed as it flies through hostile territory.
6	6	"One Way Express"	Alan J. Levi	Burton Armus	February 18, 1984	58209
Santini is hired by a movie producer to fly as a helicopter stunt pilot for a gold heist scene. Concerned for his friend's safety, Hawke tries to stop him from performing the dangerous stunt. Archangel looks behind the scenes of the movie producer discovering the stunt is actually a cover-up for a real gold robbery arranged by a criminal mastermind.
7	7	"Echos From the Past"	Harvey Laidman	C.R. O'Christopher	March 3, 1984	58211
Hawke receives a photo showing the location of his missing brother. While flying back home, he suddenly falls unconscious and crashes his helicopter. He wakes up in a hospital from a coma and is told he's been out for one year. He is also told Archangel and Santini were killed after their own attempt to get St. John had failed. Hawke soon realizes nothing is as it seems and discovers that everything is an elaborate ruse by foreign spies to get their hands on Airwolf, when an innocent nurse incidentally stumbles in the room Hawke is being held.
8	8	"Fight Like a Dove"	Stephen Dollinger	Burton Armus	March 10, 1984	58218
A woman named Sarah LeBow seeks out Hawke and Santini to help avenge the murder of her father, by a former Nazi named Kruger. Sarah wants to use Airwolf to penetrate Kruger's fortress in Paraguay. Archangel informs Hawke that The F.I.R.M. has their own interests in Kruger and he must not be interfered with. Hawke discovers that their interest lies in the fact that Kruger is also a weapons dealer in possession of an advanced artillery system known as "Thor". In this episode, Airwolf reaches an altitude of 86,500 feet during a test flight by Hawke and Santini.
9	9	"Mad Over Miami"	David Hemmings	Joseph Gunn	March 24, 1984	58216
Santini goes on a mission to deliver $2 million raised by Cuban exiles as payment to free comrades who are being held by a Cuban colonel. He is later forced down and kidnapped by a group of mercenaries who also nab the money. A F.I.R.M. listening post confirms Santini's disappearance and Archangel secretly informs Hawke about the incident. Hawke quickly sets out to find his friend while the exiles accuse Santini of stealing the money for himself. Hawke later uncovers The F.I.R.M.'s involvement in hiring the mercenaries for the benefit of the colonel who they are actually in league with.
10	10	"And They Are Us"	Nicholas Corea	Nicholas Corea	March 31, 1984	58217
Archangel sends Hawke and Santini to a small African nation to protect their president during a military coup. Hawke discovers the leader behind the coup is a rogue colonel his brother St. John served with in Vietnam. Hawke goes against Archangel's orders to stay with the president and plans to capture and extract information from the colonel but first he must get past a fleet of helicopter gunships.
11	11	"Mind of the Machine"	Ivan Dixon	T.S. Cook	April 7, 1984	58221
Archangel asks Hawke and Santini to test fly an Airwolf simulator designed by Dr. Robert Winchester (David Carradine) who worked with Dr. Moffet on the design of the real Airwolf. Involved in the test is an attractive assistant who unbeknown to all is really an undercover KGB agent with orders to steal the schematics for Airwolf so the Russians can build their own.
12	12	"To Snare a Wolf"	Alan J. Levi	Louis F. Vipperman	April 14, 1984	58210
Archangel informs Hawke and Santini that a high-ranking government official (Lance LeGault) will be using a newly launched satellite to find the hiding spot for Airwolf. Hawke and Santini plan to hide Airwolf somewhere else until the satellite flies over. On the way to the hiding spot, they discover a female pilot who is stranded in the desert, but suspicions arise that she may be a spy working for the government official who wants Airwolf found. Other notable guest stars include Kathleen Lloyd as Antonia "Toni" Donatelli and Jeff MacKay as Sergeant Willie Nash.

=== Season 2 (1984–85) ===
The second season premiered on September 22, 1984, and ran for 22 episodes until April 13, 1985. In order to have the series move away from its quite dark and moody tales of international espionage into a more domestic and straight action-oriented affair, the show hired Jean Bruce Scott to play the role of a feisty Caitlin O'Shannessy. The moves by CBS ultimately proved unsuccessful, however, and while production cost over-runs remained high, creator Donald P. Bellisario left both the studio and the series after Season 2.

Sylvester Levay who composed and performed the music for season 1, composed 14 episodes of season 2. The remaining episodes were composed by Udi Harpaz (credited as UDI) (6), and Ian Freebairn-Smith (2).

No. overall	No. in season	Title	Directed by	Written by	Original release date	Prod. code
13	1	"Sweet Britches"	Alan J. Levi	Donald P. Bellisario	September 22, 1984	58801
Hawke learns a Vietnam war buddy of his has been gunned down in the Texas desert by a corrupt and sociopathic Sheriff (Lance LeGault) after the man supposedly escaped from jail. Hawke and Santini fly Airwolf there to investigate the incident and find the conditions of the killing are suspicious. There, Hawke meets and takes interest in a female highway patrol deputy named Caitlin O'Shannessy, who is quite aware of the Sheriff's strange dealings and corruption. After catching Hawke snooping around, the Sheriff has him arrested and taken to a game reserve where ruthless sportsmen pay big money to hunt down people and Hawke is used as prey. Other notable guest stars include Jeff MacKay as Buddy, David Graf as Billie, and James Whitmore, Jr. as Sam Houston.
14	2	"Firestorm"	Ray Austin	Calvin Clements, Jr.	September 29, 1984	58803
An old pilot friend of Santini (Eugene Roche), who lost his nerve to fly after a crash had killed his passengers, has become a drunken recluse living in a trailer in the middle of the desert. The man suddenly comes to Santini with a wild story of seeing strange lights in the sky at night. Everyone dismisses the drunken rant until Santini witnesses the lights himself. He and his friend investigate but disappear. Hawke arrives in Airwolf to search for them and uncovers a secret missile base run by fanatical militants who plan to launch their own nuclear missile against Russia.
15	3	"Moffett's Ghost"	Donald A. Baer	T.S. Cook	October 6, 1984	58805
Airwolf's systems begin to act erratically when a strange virus infects the on-board computer which periodically seizes auto pilot control and turns the helicopter into a flying terror. Hawke and Santini discover the virus is a trap, a logic bomb, originally planted by Airwolf's designer, Dr. Moffet, and programmed to unleash itself at a specific time unless the proper override code is entered. Hawke and Santini must make the decision to allow the F.I.R.M.'s engineers access to fix the helicopter and risk them trying to seize the aircraft, or deal with the virus themselves. This is the second episode wherein Airwolf, with Moffet jamming its controls, climbs to an altitude of at least 85,000 feet (the first time this was accomplished was in the season one episode "Fight Like a Dove" during a test flight by Hawke and Santini).
16	4	"The Truth About Holly"	Alan J. Levi	Phil Combest	October 13, 1984	58802
Hawke and Santini rescue Santini's niece Holly from a compound ran by a Mexican crimelord. Once she is safe, Santini keeps an eye on her at his airport, but strange things begin to occur around Santini Air. Hawke and Santini believe the gangsters may be trying to scare Holly, but the sabotage incidents become worse after Hawke turns down Holly's passionate advances and when former Texas Highway Patrol Deputy, Caitlin O'Shannessy, arrives to work for Santini. Caitlin's relationship with Hawke sparks a jealous rage in the troubled Holly leading to suspicions she is behind the sabotage.
17	5	"The Hunted"	Sutton Roley	Chester Krumholz	October 20, 1984	58810
An industrial millionaire, Carter Anderson III (Joseph Chapman) offers a big paying contract to Hawke and Santini, requesting they use Airwolf to protect and transport him around whenever the need arises. Santini is excited by the offer, but Hawke is skeptical, wondering why the man requires such protection. Unbeknown to them is the fact that Caitlin's new boyfriend is really an assassin who has been hired to kill the millionaire. Matters become worse when Airwolf experiences sudden erratic engine malfunctions.
18	6	"Sins of the Past"	Donald A. Baer	Westbrook Claridge	October 27, 1984	58811
Santini is stunned at the news that his daughter Sally Ann has been found dead on a beach on the Caribbean Island of San Remo, apparently from a drug overdose. Hawke is stunned as well because Santini never told him he had a daughter. Both men divert from a F.I.R.M. mission and fly to San Remo to attend the funeral which ends in a bitter argument between Santini and his ex-wife Lila. Upon returning, Santini learns that Lila has been murdered, and he is promptly arrested by police as the prime suspect. Santini is taken back to San Remo and Hawke follows to conduct his own investigation despite objections from Archangel to finish the F.I.R.M. mission. Hawke discovers that Lila and Sally have a connection to a ruthless casino owner who has been trying to take over the island and he is determined to expose the man as the real killer.
19	7	"Fallen Angel"	Sutton Roley	Deborah Pratt	November 3, 1984	58804
Both Hawke and Santini are injured after a botched stunt in a biplane. Hawke injures his arm but Santini fares worse, injuring his back and is bed-ridden. At the hospital, Hawke is informed that Archangel has been taken prisoner by the criminal ex-Nazi Karl Kruger and is being held in an East-German compound. Mounting a rescue operation, Hawke must add Caitlin to the Airwolf crew to temporarily replace Santini. In a rush to train her, Caitlin does not perform well and nearly blows up Airwolf. Hawke realizes he cannot perform the rescue without Santini's experience, so he and Caitlin spring him against authority, from the hospital, and head to East Germany to save Archangel. Aiding them in the rescue is a female foreign spy also a former love interest of Archangel, but can she be trusted? (Note: Jan-Michael Vincent's arm was really broken in this episode due to a drunken argument with his then-wife, Joanne. In the previous episode, some shots show Jan's arm is severely swollen)
20	8	"HX 1"	Gerald Mayer	Steve Hayes	November 10, 1984	58807
The advanced helicopter, "HX1", is stolen by a group of mercenaries and Hawke learns that the tactics used in the theft are similar to those used by the special forces unit his brother St. John worked with. Believing the mercenaries may have connections with his missing brother, Hawke takes Airwolf out to track down the stolen helicopter. Hawke's suspicions are confirmed when one of the men turns out to be a war buddy of St. John's who Hawke thought was dead. The incident causes him to have flashbacks and he thinks he sees his brother momentarily. The rogue mercenaries have no intention of returning the HX1 and decide to try out their new toy against Airwolf. During the combat, Hawke's feelings get in his way, and he must fight his emotions if he wants to survive. PJ Soles guest stars as Ellie.
21	9	"Flight #093 is Missing"	Bernard L. Kowalski	Chester Krumholz & Calvin Clements, Jr.	November 17, 1984	58816
Flight #093 has been hijacked and crash landed into the ocean. The terrorists claim the hostages are still alive and threaten to finish them off unless paid $50 million. The incident becomes personal once Hawke and Santini learn that Caitlin was on the flight and mount a search and rescue operation to find the downed plane. Upon finding it, they discover the terrorists are using a fishing ship armed with rockets to thwart any rescue attempt and depth charges to destroy the plane. Time is running out for the passengers as the plane is filling with water and running out of air. Footage from the movie Airport '77 was used to portray the sunken Boeing 747.. Seemingly a response to the September 11, 2001 terrorists attacks, during which United flight 93 was hijacked and crashed into a field in Pennsylvania, the episode title was changed to 'Undertow' and appears with the updated title on streaming outlets that air the series.
22	10	"Once a Hero"	Leslie H. Martinson	Alfonse M. Ruggiero, Jr.	November 24, 1984	58819
Hawke is presented with an outdated surveillance photo of a POW camp located deep inside the jungles of Laos where the F.I.R.M. believe his brother St. John is being held prisoner. Hawke mounts a rescue attempt, rounding up members of his old Vietnam War strike team to go in and find him. His strike team is wary of the mission but reconsider once they learn Airwolf will be supplying air support. The team meets up in Bangkok and begins their trek behind enemy lines to locate the camp. Upon arrival, Hawke and his team find the camp abandoned and his brother has been moved elsewhere.
23	11	"Random Target"	Virgil W. Vogel	Story by : Herman Groves; Teleplay by : Paul Savage and Chester Krumholz & Westbrook Claridge	December 8, 1984	58813
Hawke and Santini go on a job to film some desert terrain footage for Santini's fellow airport business partner Sam Kowal. After completing the job the film is given to Kowal, who later turns up dead after being killed by thugs in a mob hit. The police cannot find any connections Kowal may have had to the mob and determine the hit to be random, but Hawke is not satisfied and begins his own investigation which begins to conflict with the police detective's (Anne Lockhart) investigation. Hawke soon finds out that he and Santini may have filmed something in the desert that the mob boss did not want to be seen.
24	12	"Condemned"	Tom Blank	Douglas Steinberg	January 5, 1985	58818
The F.I.R.M. assigns Hawke to investigate a remote facility in Alaska where scientists have been working on an experimental vaccine to counteract the deadly effects of Russian bio-weapon virus set loose in Afghanistan. The F.I.R.M. had already sent a four-man commando team in but they failed to report back. With Santini on vacation, Hawke and Caitlin take the assignment and fly Airwolf to the facility. Upon arrival, they find everyone dead and it looks as if they have all killed each other. Suspicions arise however once Hawke detects a Russian submarine is lurking in nearby waters.
25	13	"The American Dream"	Virgil W. Vogel	Dennis R. Foley	January 12, 1985	58817
Hawke helps out a troubled Vietnamese man he fought alongside in Vietnam whose crops are being sabotaged by a rival Vietnamese landowner known as "The Spider". When the sabotage turns to murder, Hawke takes matters into his own hands and is determined to bring the Spider to justice.
26	14	"Inn at the End of the Road"	Ray Austin	Westbrook Claridge & Alfonse M. Ruggiero, Jr.	January 26, 1985	58823
When a prototype weapon guidance computer called "LOKI" is stolen by terrorists, Archangel assigns Hawke and Santini to recover the device before it falls into enemy hands. They track the terrorists to a remote mountain lake where the criminals become lost and cannot find their contact. They find a cabin and take the owners hostage, discovering one of them is a pilot, and force him to fly them out. Airwolf gives chase, but during the pursuit has damaged Airwolf and injured Hawke. Time is running out for the hostages who are holed up in a frozen meat locker, and the terrorists have installed the LOKI device in a helicopter gunship and plan to assassinate a visiting foreign dignitary.
27	15	"Santini's Millions"	Sutton Roley	Michael Halperin	February 2, 1985	58824
Santini is piloting Airwolf on a mercy mission to deliver a transplant heart to a dying boy in Chicago. Along the way he comes upon a downed aircraft piloted by a millionaire named Carl Barron and comes to his aid. The millionaire is desperate to make a business meeting in L.A. and offers Santini $50,000 to divert from the heart delivery and take him straight there, but Santini refuses and continues on to Chicago. With the heart delivered, Santini takes Barron to L.A. in record time, but very late for the meeting. Later that evening, for no apparent reason, Barron commits suicide but leaves behind a will that gives half riches to his niece and the other half to Santini, "the most honest man he ever met". Both Santini and Barron's selfish business partner are stunned by the act, but the partner denies the will and refuses to hand any money over to Santini. Santini clearly does not want to be involved in the first place but quickly finds himself in over his head and his life possibly in danger.
28	16	"Prisoner of Yesterday"	Georg Fenady	Chester Krumholz & T.S. Cook	February 9, 1985	58825
Hawke is on a relaxing fishing trip with a doctor friend named Jason Gifford, but the tranquil setting is disturbed when two South American rebels show up and kidnap Dr. Gifford at gun-point and disable Hawke's Jeep so he cannot follow. Determined to get his friend back, Hawke learns that Gifford had been treating a South American President with antibiotics but the man is suffering from radiation poisoning which had been traced back to Gifford's drugs. The plot thickens when upon arrival in the country, Hawke learns a rebel leader is plotting an attack on the American Embassy and to overthrow the President covertly by slowly killing him off, and win political support by framing Gifford (and American involvement) for the death.
29	17	"Natural Born"	Virgil W. Vogel	Alfonse M. Ruggiero, Jr. & Westbrook Claridge	February 23, 1985	58830
Stringfellow Hawke and Caitlin talk Dominic into hiring a young hotshot pilot, Kevin Hansen, but do not realize that the kid has more in mind than his employer would suspect. Kevin is after the men who killed his beloved Uncle Chester Hansen (Noble Willingham). He taught Kevin how to fly helicopters and was admired and loved by his nephew. When Chester Hansen refused to join some of his business associates in airborne drug-running, he was killed. Whilst performing aerial stunts for Santini Air he spots the dealer's unusual black helicopter and gives chase. Hawke and Santini have no idea what the boy is doing and decide to ground him since he will not tell them about the murder. Secretly, Kevin plans to hunt down the killers and bring them to justice. Production note: Stuntman Reid Rondell was killed during the filming of this episode in the crash of a Bell 205 used in the production.
30	18	"Out of the Sky"	Bruce Seth Green	Gregory Harris & Charles Winston	March 2, 1985	58827
Hawke and Santini film aerial footage for a music video by country star Roxanne Marvel (Misty Rowe). Unknown to everyone, Roxanne's corrupt manager and ex-husband is plotting her murder to boost record sales, and replaces her with a body double. Unfortunately for him, the double is not on par to the singing talent of the original and the dupe is revealed, however it is too late since the real Roxanne has already been kidnapped by the manager's thugs. Hawke and Santini mount a rescue in Airwolf and have to recover the star before her big concert appearance.
31	19	"Dambreakers"	Virgil W. Vogel	Story by : Westbrook Claridge & Alfonse M. Ruggiero, Jr. & Douglas Steinberg; Teleplay by : Westbrook Claridge & Alfonse M. Ruggiero, Jr.	March 9, 1985	58832
Hawke is hired to fly a news reporter to interview a group of religious puritans who have an isolated commune near a hydro-electrical dam. Hawke and the reporter discover the villagers have been taken hostage by a group of terrorists who disable Hawke's helicopter and prevent them from leaving. They are then held as hostages where the leader gives the reporter the news story of her career; his plan is to blow up the Tidewater Dam if fellow extremist members are not released from American prisons. Hawke manages to escape and gets a message through to Santini. He and Caitlin come looking for him with Airwolf, but they will have to contend with the terrorist's B-25 bomber which will be used to destroy the dam.
32	20	"Severance Pay"	Sidney Hayers	Chester Krumholz	March 16, 1985	58806
Hawke is assigned to find Larry Mason (Arte Johnson), a disgruntled former F.I.R.M. agent, who has been shafted on his retirement benefits. As a result, Mason begins to reveal classified information to the press about his previous employer and it begins to jeopardize foreign relations and national security. One of the secrets threatening to be leaked is the existence of Airwolf and the whole story behind it. When specific information is leaked about a mission that Mason was never involved with, Hawke becomes suspicious and believes there has to be another mole lurking inside the F.I.R.M. Martin Milner guest stars as Arthur Barnes.
33	21	"Eruption"	Tom Blank	Story by : Kevin Hartigan; Teleplay by : Kevin Hartigan & T.S. Cook	April 6, 1985	58829
Hawke and Santini are on a job to take atmospheric samples around Mt. Catherine, a dormant volcano that is showing signs of "waking up". They collect their data just in time to witness Catherine "blow her top" and escape the blast. The eruption shock destroys a town in a nearby valley and Hawke and Santini set down to render aid. They find some of the survivors holed up in an abandoned mine where another quake from Catherine nearly kills Hawke as he tries to guide them out. Hawke soon discovers the real danger is not the volcano, but a rival community leader (Mills Watson) with murderous plans to eliminate the town mayor and make it look like an accident. A grown-up Angela Cartwright (Penny Robinson from Lost in Space) guest appears as Mrs. Krannovitch.
34	22	"Short Walk to Freedom"	Virgil W. Vogel	Robert Blees & Dorothy Robinson	April 13, 1985	58831
Caitlin is hired to fly a group of archeology students and their teacher to Mayan ruins in South America. In reality, the teacher is really a mastermind thief and is using the trip as cover to steal whatever priceless artifacts he can find. The trip goes astray however, when a group of guerilla fighters block the road and hijack the bus. The F.I.R.M. learns of the hostage crisis through their South American contacts and Archangel informs Hawke of the situation. He and Santini quickly mount a rescue in Airwolf to find Caitlin and the students. Once the guerilla fighters see Airwolf arrive they plan to capture the high-tech chopper for themselves and fire a missile to bring her down.

=== Season 3 (1985–86) ===
The third season premiered on September 28, 1985, and concluded on March 29, 1986, with 22 episodes aired. Following the departure of series creator Donald P. Bellisario, Bernard Kowalski stepped in as executive producer for a third season, but after ratings remained low, the series was canceled by CBS.

No. overall	No. in season	Title	Directed by	Written by	Original release date	Prod. code
35	1	"The Horn of Plenty"	Sutton Roley	Sutton Roley	September 28, 1985	61108
Hawke flies a woman named Angelica (Catherine Hickland) to an Arizona resort where she carries a suitcase full of priceless gems for a buyer named John Bradford Horn (Richard Lynch). A sudden change in plans sends Hawke and Angelica to Horn's private compound in Texas, but upon landing, they are surrounded by armed men and taken prisoner. A videotape is sent to Santini where Hawke explains he is being held captive and tells Santini to deliver Airwolf to Horn's compound by a certain time or he'll be executed. Santini informs Archangel of the situation, who devises a plan. He tells Santini to deliver Airwolf as requested, but he will provide a platoon of soldiers who will storm the compound once Hawke is safe. The plan backfires when Hawke shoots Santini with a tranquilizer gun as soon as he sets Airwolf down.
36	2	"Airwolf II"	Don Medford	Story by : Louie Elias; Teleplay by : Al Martinez	October 5, 1985	61113
Hawke is interrupted during a friend's ceremony when Archangel arrives to inform him that Hawke is suspected in a train robbery where the thieves used a Santini Air helicopter and a weapon similar to one Airwolf carries, to stop the train. Hawke, Santini and Caitlin are baffled when the FBI finds the getaway chopper, complete with several bullet holes, parked at Santini's hangar as further evidence. Archangel uses his perks to help Hawke as much as he can but then he is dismissed from the F.I.R.M. under suspicions that he may have also been involved in the robbery. Investigating further, Archangel discovers the F.I.R.M. has built a second Airwolf, dubbed Redwolf, and the designer, Harlen Jenkins (Wings Hauser), who is still loyal to the notorious Dr. Moffet, has a personal vendetta against Hawke. Jenkins reveals to be one responsible for the set up by hijacking Redwolf and kidnapping Caitlin. It is a deadly showdown begins with Hawke in Airwolf against Jenkins in Airwolf II to see which wolf can outmatch the other.
37	3	"And a Child Shall Lead"	Allen Reisner	Stephen A. Miller	October 12, 1985	61110
A leading aircraft designer, Robert Phelps, is abducted by foreign agents to the horror of his mentally challenged son, Bobby. Hawke takes the assignment to find Phelps, obtaining leads from Bobby, whose autism gives him the ability to draw detailed clues from memory. While in the agent's custody, Phelps has a sudden heart-attack and is rendered useless to them. Learning that his latest design plans could be accurately reproduced by Bobby, the agents attempt to kidnap him, but Hawke and Airwolf get in their way. Larry Linville guest stars as Clinton Maxwell.
38	4	"Fortune Teller"	Sutton Roley	Story by : James L. Novack & Rick Kelbaugh; Teleplay by : Rick Kelbaugh	October 19, 1985	61105
Archangel fails to meet Hawke and Santini at a secret rendezvous point, and the F.I.R.M. learns he has been kidnapped and being tortured by a criminal military hardware dealer named Stoner. They give Hawke 48 hours to find him, or the F.I.R.M. will send in their group of assassins known as "Zebra Squad" to take him out themselves. Stoner wants information about a device called "The Fortune Teller" which allows a pilot to fly his aircraft through mental commands. Hawke and his companions with the aid of a psychic medium race to save Archangel before the Zebra Squad can be activated.
39	5	"Crossover"	Don Medford	Elliot West	October 26, 1985	61106
Hawke is working covertly for the F.I.R.M. in Baja, Mexico to meet defecting Czech laser-scientists Victor Janek (John van Dreelen), and his daughter, Inge. Hawke soon learns that a Soviet bounty-hunter (Albert Paulsen) is hot on the duo's trail with orders to eliminate them. The hunter manages to kill Victor, but Hawke and Inge get away and make a run into the desert. Santini and Caitlin become dismayed when Archangel refuses to help them since Hawke has crossed over from the F.I.R.M.'s strict mission stipulations, and has already been written off. Santini and Caitlin go out in Airwolf to rescue them on their own. A determined government agent wants custody of Inge, but Archangel refuses. When the agent tries tracking Archangel's movements to find her, Inge recommends a known ally she and her father trust. However when she is in his custody nobody knows that the man has ties to the Soviets.
40	6	"Kingdom Come"	Harvey S. Laidman	Story by : Michael Halperin; Teleplay by : Rick Kelbaugh & Michael Halperin	November 2, 1985	61107
A stockpile of nuclear detonators, (which can detonate any large amount of radioactive material and turn into a deadly bomb), are stolen from a government facility. The mastermind behind the robbery is the facility chief of security and gets close to Caitlin to kidnap her. The robber wants to smuggle the detonators out of the country using Hawke and Santini to fly Airwolf, whose stealth technology will provide perfect cover. Adding to the complication the robber attaches explosive devices to Caitlin and inside Airwolf in case Hawke and Santini deviate or pursue.
41	7	"Eagles"	Virgil W. Vogel	Edward J. Lakso	November 9, 1985	61109
An advanced airplane built by Stappleford Industries, the "X-400", is to be handed over to the U.S. Air Force who are interested in the craft's performance. The X-400's main test pilot, Roane Carver, knows the plane has potentially deadly flaws and interferes with the final sale knowing her company is selling a dangerous lemon and steals the schematics. Hawke gets involved in helping Roane fight her greedy employer, who goes as far as attempted murder to shut her up and get the plans back.
42	8	"Annie Oakley"	Daniel Haller	Story by : Carleton Eastlake; Teleplay by : Harold Stone & Rick Kelbaugh	November 16, 1985	61102
An advanced laser device called "The Mongoose", is stolen from a F.I.R.M. transport while it was on its way to a testing ground. The thief, Karl Stern, is expected to sell the laser on the black market to an East German buyer, but when his partner, Slade, realizes he is being shafted on his cut of the sale money, he threatens to go to the F.I.R.M. for a reward. Stern refuses to give in so Slade carries out his threat and makes the call. Hawke and Santini are ordered to pick up Slade at a wild west rodeo, but Slade is killed in a mysterious accident. It is now up to them to find and secure the weapon before Stern can smuggle it to Cuba. Tia Carrere makes a brief guest appearance as Kiki Tanabi.
43	9	"Jennie"	Bernard L. Kowalski	Katharyn Michaelian Powers	November 23, 1985	61115
Hawke and Caitlin go to a war-torn South American country, meeting up with a legendary soldier named "El Gato", and work to find an imprisoned scientist. Hawke learns that in the year the scientist was held, he developed a robotic tank called the "ALV" (Automated Land Vehicle) which can be piloted remotely and it is now in the possession of the rebel forces. The group springs the scientist, during which El Gato is killed. Outnumbered, the group hides out in remote village where they meet an American woman who is teaching deaf children. The rebel army sends the ALV into the village to wipe it out and the only hope lies in Airwolf to destroy the tank first.
44	10	"The Deadly Circle"	Harvey S. Laidman	Robert Specht	November 30, 1985	61111
The families of three of Hawke's Vietnamese friends have been kidnapped and taken to an isolated compound in the California desert. He discovers the kidnappers are survivors of "Village #108" which was a target destroyed in an air strike led by Hawke and his three friends after intelligence said it was a Viet-Cong hide out. Archangel reveals the original intelligence was wrong and Hawke's men had destroyed an innocent village by mistake. Now the two survivors from that village seek revenge and plan to execute the families in a similar airstrike of the compound where they are being held.
45	11	"Where Have All the Children Gone?"	Daniel Haller	Story by : Alan Godfrey; Teleplay by : Al Martinez	December 14, 1985	61114
A Vietnam War buddy of Hawke's named John Fargo has died and been laid to rest. Hawke takes Fargo's coffin flag and war medals to a small town to give them to Fargo's only relative, his estranged brother Billy, who did not show at the funeral. Billy however, is nowhere to be found, and a young girl at his residence informs Hawke he does not live there anymore. Hawke tries to locate the local Sheriff but finds Billy running the town which is populated by hippy youths who look upon Billy as their "father figure". Hawke's snooping lands him in jail until Santini comes looking for him. Santini springs him out and the two discover the militia trained youths have stolen a nuclear missile called "Spaceguard" from a nearby aerospace facility and plan to target Washington D.C. in the ultimate "anti-war" message. Hawke and Santini must press Airwolf to her limits and stop the missile before it hits its target. This is the episode wherein Airwolf pushed its altitude limit from 85,000 to 100,000 feet (upper limit of the atmosphere) and its speed to Mach 2.
46	12	"Half-Pint"	Bernard McEveety	Robert Janes	December 21, 1985	61117
Hawke discovers that his brother St. John has a half-Vietnamese son named Le Van, nick-named "Half-Pint", who is living with an adopted family. The adopted father Darren McBride tells Hawke that he was part of St. John's strike team where he personally saw his brother go down during a raid on a Viet Cong chemical weapons facility and believes he was killed. Hawke does not believe the story and checks on McBride's war record which is a clean slate. Hawke then takes his nephew for a weekend trip to his cabin and spends time getting to know his new nephew. Hawke gets emotional when he has to return Le Van to the McBride family but later gets involved when he learns Le Van has run away from home. Hawke, McBride and his friend Glen Carson search for him, finding the boy being harassed by street thugs. Hawke gets suspicious when he learns Carson is somehow involved with the thugs and finds out he and McBride are running a mercy operation to retrieve dead American soldiers still being found in Vietnam. The coffin operation turns out to be a cover for Carson's cocaine smuggling business.
47	13	"Wildfire"	Vincent McEveety	David Westheimer	January 11, 1986	61116
Santini gets to spend time with an old oil-drilling friend named "Big Cec" (Ken Curtis) and his son "Lil' Cec" (Ken Olandt). Santini is shocked to learn the son was thrown out of college for marijuana possession and their "father-son relationship" has been falling apart since Cec's wife died. Big Cec hopes things will go better for his son now that he was given a promising job at the oil company, but trouble really begins when it is revealed that Lil' Cec job has been smuggling drugs out of Mexico for the company's shady owners. Lance LeGault makes his third and final appearance on Airwolf as Noble Flowers. Gregory Sierra, who played Julio Fuentes on Sanford and Son, guest stars as Ochoa.
48	14	"Discovery"	Alan Cooke	Story by : Del Reisman; Teleplay by : Stephen A. Miller	January 18, 1986	61118
The criminal mastermind, John Bradford Horn (John Vernon) (credited as John R. Vernon) returns, and has sent his henchmen to execute a woman, Grace Harrison, and her boyfriend out in the desert. Grace is shot but manages to get away, crawling into a cave which happens to be the hiding spot of Airwolf. Hawke and Santini rush out in response to a security alarm and find Grace unconscious and near death. The two take her to a hospital run by the F.I.R.M. She is treated, and Archangel decides to let her go, but puts a tail on her. Grace is captured again by Horn but she reveals the location of Airwolf in exchange for her life.
49	15	"Day of Jeopardy"	Georg Fenady	Story by : Everett Chambers; Teleplay by : Rick Kelbaugh	January 25, 1986	61119
Tess Dixon (Anne Lockhart), the wife of the infamous crimelord Cullen Dixon (Clu Gulager), and an old flame of Hawke's, escapes her husband's bodyguards and Archangel contacts Hawke to deliver her to a safehouse. She plans to testify against her husband's involvement in a plot to assassinate several top-ranking Washington officials, but Hawke's previous involvement with Tess makes it difficult for him. He must set his feelings aside once Tess comes under attack by Cullen's thugs and a mole within the F.I.R.M. who will make sure Tess does not live to testify. G. Gordon Liddy guest stars as Barkley Kase.
50	16	"Little Wolf"	Bernard McEveety	Robert Specht	February 1, 1986	61122
Hawke is visiting a former Vietnam War pal named Greg Stewart and finds him in the midst of a child custody battle between him and his ex-wife, Rainey. The battle becomes more complicated when Greg's rich mother Martha, gets involved and refuses to release the child from her custody at her ranch. Rainey hides the child in Santini's car, and he and Hawke quickly find themselves accused of kidnapping. The baby was played by twins Max and John Kenworthy.
51	17	"Desperate Monday"	Gregory Prange	Story by : Robert Janes; Teleplay by : Rick Kelbaugh & J.L. D'Angeles	February 8, 1986	61120
Caitlin is attending a Kappa Lambda Chi sorority homecoming on the Queen Mary luxury liner. Unbeknown to her, one of her friends, Barbara Scarelli, the daughter of a rich businessman, is about to be kidnapped in an extortion attempt set up by her shady boyfriend Robert (Bryan Cranston). The kidnap attempt backfires when one of the kidnappers kills one of Barbara's bodyguards and sets off alarms. In a panic, the three thugs take the whole gathering hostage and make demands for a helicopter to the SWAT team that stands by. The F.I.R.M. sends in Airwolf to trap and take the criminals out.
52	18	"Hawke's Run"	Richard Irving	B.W. Sandefur	February 15, 1986	61127
An old Vietnam War buddy invites Hawke to join his mercenary squad, but Hawke turns down the offer. The friend then invites Hawke to an art showing, but before he can respond to that request, an assassination squad appears. Hawke is shot, but manages to escape. He is helped by a passerby who gets him to the hospital under an assumed name. Hawke tries to contact Archangel for help, but Zeus intervenes and believes Hawke has been compromised and calls in the Zebra Squad to finish him off. Hawke now finds himself running from assassins on both fronts. The leader of the assassin is a supposed dead F.I.R.M. operative. it's also revealed his friend is a spy for the F.I.R.M. and has sensitive intel that the operative is eager to acquire.
53	19	"Break-In at Santa Paula"	Dennis Donnelly	Edward J. Lakso	February 22, 1986	61131
Hawke helps a friend get her wrongly convicted son Terry, out of a brutal Mexican prison. Apparently her business is perfect for potential illegal activities; although she refuses, the conspirator put her son in prison as leverage if she doesn't reconsider. Hawke goes to get a layout of the prison and poses as Terry's uncle to get close to him. The rescue attempt fails when Terry refuses to leave a fellow inmate behind and Hawke's cover is blown. He finds himself thrown into the same prison until Santini and Caitlin mount a rescue. Jane Merrow guest stars.
54	20	"The Girl Who Fell From the Sky"	Don Chaffey	B.W. Sandefur	March 15, 1986	61132
During a night-time fishing trip, Hawke spots a helicopter fly down and dump a body into the lake. He fishes the body out of the lake finding it to be a young woman who is barely alive and takes her to a hospital. The girl recovers but has lost all memory as a result of being injected with medication that erases her memory. Hawke uncovers her identity as a high class prostitute, but the fact that people are still after her indicates there is more to her identity than anticipated. Eventually it's revealed that a politician is involved in an arms deal and the woman is the only witness to the existence of the deal.
55	21	"Tracks"	Ron Stein	Rick Kelbaugh	March 22, 1986	61124
Hawke takes a group of vets who use wheelchairs on an outdoor trip into the mountains, but the group runs across a deranged woodsman known as "The Cat" who has been terrorizing and murdering anyone who trespasses on "his mountain". Santini and Caitlin learn Hawke and the men are in trouble and mount a rescue attempt, racing against time to find the team first before the killer does.
56	22	"Birds of Paradise"	Bernard L. Kowalski	Robert Janes	March 29, 1986	61129
Hawke's nephew "Half-Pint" shows up at Santini Air begging for help to find his stepmother, Minh Van McBride, who has been missing for weeks. With Archangel's help, Hawke and Santini track Minh Van's last whereabouts to a swanky nightclub. They learn she has been abducted by Nick Kincaid (Eric Braeden), a "white slaver" who kidnaps foreign women and sells them as sex-slaves. Hawke also learns that Kincaid is a drug trafficker, currently looking for a reputable pilot to smuggle shipments for him. Hawke poses as an interested pilot to get inside Kincaid's operation and locate Minh Van.

=== Season 4 (1987) ===
For season four, CBS wanted to make the show into a more family-friendly, action-oriented program. Bernard L. Kowalski abandoned the project a year after series creator Bellisario had decided to leave as well. USA Network picked up distribution of the show, but with the remaining principal cast being too expensive to hire, an entirely new cast was created.

Season four aired from January to August 1987, and was produced on a comparatively shoe-string budget. Atlantis Production's contract did not provide the producers with the flying Bell 222 helicopter used for Airwolf, and recycled aerial footage and poorly produced special effects failed to match the quality of the prior seasons. The full-sized mock-up of Airwolf from prior seasons was used for static shots.

In the first episode of this new version, "Blackjack", Hawke's missing brother St. John was suddenly found, creating contradictions to the character's already-varied history. He took over as pilot of Airwolf with its new crew. "The F.I.R.M." was now suddenly referred to as "The Company", and gone were its famous white suits. Filming of the fourth season was completed in six months.

No. overall	No. in season	Title	Directed by	Written by	Original release date	Prod. code
57	1	"Blackjack"	Alan Simmonds	Michael Mercer, Jana Veverka	January 23, 1987	0906
Hawke and Santini's niece Jo are testing a helicopter control device, and after landing they find an audio tape that someone secretly placed into the helicopter. The tape reveals evidence that Hawke's lost brother St. John is still alive and being held prisoner somewhere in South East Asia by a rebel mercenary group. Hawke takes the tape to the F.I.R.M. where he finds Archangel has been suddenly reassigned to the Middle-East and replaced by Jason Locke. Locke determines the tape proves nothing and refuses to get involved. Later, Hawke receives a mysterious package containing St. John's ring, further proof that his brother may still be alive and trying to send a message. Suddenly, Santini is killed when the helicopter he was about to fly explodes. The blast seriously injures Hawke and he slips into unconsciousness at the hospital. Meanwhile, Locke assigns pilot Major Michael Rivers to find Airwolf and return it to the F.I.R.M. (which has been renamed "The Company"). Jo Santini discovers what is going on and intercepts Rivers convincing him to help her find St. John. Rivers goes against orders and flies Airwolf to Asia to rescue St. John and bring him back home. St. John is found alive and returns to the United States just in time to be with Hawke; whose fate is left unknown.
58	2	"Escape"	Patrick Corbett	Patrick Kennedy	January 30, 1987	0901
Jo is in Istanbul awaiting her contact who has smuggled top secret papers out of Bulgaria. The papers contain the locations of Soviet missile installations and are brought to a Stockholm peace conference as evidence that the Soviets are violating treaty stipulations. Her contact fails to show so she goes looking for him and finds him shot. Before he dies he reveals his hiding place for the papers and Jo retrieves them. She gets on her plane for Stockholm but the flight is forced down by Bulgarian fighter jets. Jo is arrested as a spy and taken to a prison. Now St. John and Rivers must rescue her in time for the conference.
59	3	"A Town for Hire"	Patrick Corbett	Gwen Tulpa, Jordan Nicht	February 6, 1987	0904
Jo is testing a new navigation computer in her Jet Ranger helicopter, as St. John follows in his plane. Suddenly, both aircraft are fired upon by a laser weapon. Jo crashes in the wilderness but St. John manages to make an emergency landing at a nearby airport. He is injured and taken to the small town of San Maria's hospital, but is furious that no one is looking for Jo's downed helicopter. Once he recovers his strength, he forces a local deputy to go looking for Jo but they can find no trace of the helicopter. The plot thickens as the whole town seems to be under the control of the nearby company, Lundhal Industries. Once the company is revealed to be a secret weapons testing facility, and Jo has stumbled on their operation, St. John fetches Airwolf to conduct a rescue, but soon Airwolf becomes the laser's next target.
60	4	"Salvage"	Ken Jubenvill	A.P. Liddell	February 13, 1987	0903
St. John and Rivers go to the remote town of Devil's Peak to meet a former F.I.R.M. employee and check on her story of strange sounds and lights coming from a nearby Indian burial ground. Investigating, the two stumble upon a secret base where an advanced military helicopter called the Scorpion is being tested and ready to be handed over to the KGB.
61	5	"Windows"	Ken Jubenvill	Leslie McBride	February 20, 1987	0905
The Company sends the Airwolf crew to tail a KGB agent who has stolen computer boards belonging to a new government spy satellite. The team must recover the boards before they are handed off to his Soviet comrades. They manage to kill the agent and secure one of the boards but the other has already been handed off to a second operative. The crew must get it back before the second agent can escape the country.
62	6	"A Piece of Cake"	Bruce Pittman	Anthony Robertson	February 27, 1987	0907
Jo catches a teenage boy hiding at the Santini Air hangar who has run away from a nearby wilderness youth camp. The boy seems afraid of being returned to his abusive grandfather, but Jo and Rivers bring him back to the camp and decide to help make sure nothing happens to the boy. The boy's hostile grandfather shows up threatening to kill everyone with a rifle and a bomb unless his grandson his handed over. In a scuffle, the man kidnaps Jo and takes her to a nearby dam. St. John arrives to help in Airwolf and he and Rivers try to get Jo back before the madman carries out his threat to kill her if his grandson is not returned.
63	7	"Deathtrain"	Patrick Corbett	Jordan Nicht, Gwen Tulpa	February 27, 1987	0902
Airwolf is on a mission to guard a train carrying a deadly nerve gas on its way for disposal, but a rebel mercenary group sets up a trap ahead of the train at a mountain tunnel. The train enters the tunnel and the Airwolf's crew temporarily lose sight of it until it reemerges at the other end. Soon, they realize they have been duped and are following a decoy train that was hidden in the tunnel while the real one has been stopped and diverted elsewhere. The mercenaries take the gas canisters off the train and hand them over to their fanatical leader who has his own dubious plans for the deadly chemical. The situation intensifies when Locke and a Russian commander who were on the train to supervise the disposal, are captured and held as hostages.
64	8	"Code of Silence"	Allan Simmonds	Bartholomew S. Spellman	March 13, 1987	0910
Airwolf is supporting a group of military helicopters who are returning a kidnapped U.S. Ambassador who has just been set free by friendly ground forces. The mission is being led by Colonel Combs, a man who St. John once served under and is not on good terms with. During the flight home, one of the helicopters piloted by an Army General's son, is shot down and crashes. Now Colonel Combs is being held responsible for the pilot's death. St. John is stunned when Combs chooses his former enemy, St. John, to help in his defense at the court martial.
65	9	"Stavograd (Part 1)" "The Stavograd Incident (Part 1)"	Ken Jubenvill	Sydney Burrows	March 20, 1987	0911
On a covert surveillance mission, Airwolf's scanners detect a large plume of radioactive gas being vented from the nuclear power plant at Stavograd, Russia. A new component at the power plant has failed and the engineers cannot stop the dangerous gas leak which is threatening the lives of millions. Disobeying Company orders to not get involved, St. John offers the Russians assistance but they refuse the help and warn not to enter their airspace. St. John pilots Airwolf into Soviet airspace anyway and is quickly fired upon. Although Airwolf avoids their missile strike, she is eventually surrounded by Migs and forced to land where the crew are captured. Learning Airwolf has been compromised, The Company simply writes them off and denies involvement.
66	10	"Stavograd (Part 2)" "The Stavograd Incident (Part 2)"	Ken Jubenvill	Sydney Burrows	March 27, 1987	0909
The story continues as the Airwolf crew are being held as spies and "The Lady" is in the hands of the enemy. Locke is furious about his employer's decision to abandon them and decides to enter Russia on his own under a bogus passport, posing as an international athlete. Arriving at Stavograd, Locke attempt to get the crew out of lock up, but his cover is blown and he finds himself in jail with them. Once St. John learns of the commanding officer, General Kirov's plan to fire a missile into the Stavograd reactor to seal the leak, St. John indicates that only Airwolf's laser can fire so accurately. When one of Kirov's fighters tries the maneuver and fails, Kirov turns to St. John's plan, but St. John negotiates to do the job only if they release his companions. Kirov reluctantly agrees, and as promised, St. John flies Airwolf to the reactor to seal the leak.
67	11	"Mime Troupe"	Bruce Pittman	Lyal Brown, Barbara Brown	April 3, 1987	0908
The Airwolf crew go to France to protect Anna LeBlanc, the star of a mime troupe and whose father is dedicated to fighting terrorism. The Company believes she may be the target of a retaliation after her father receives a threat letter. St. John and Locke try to uncover who is plotting her demise, while Jo and Rivers stay close to the girl, but she does not believe her life is in danger once the agents reveal who they are.
68	12	"X-Virus"	Ken Jubenvill	Lyal Brown, Barbara Brown	April 10, 1987	0912
St. John investigates the murder of a Japanese businessman who was injected with a deadly experimental virus. St. John learns that if the virus were released it could kill millions of people. Now he must uncover the madman behind its creation and avert his deadly attack.
69	13	"Rogue Warrior"	Brad Turner	R.B. Carney	April 24, 1987	0914
Once again the Company tries to take possession of Airwolf after Rivers and Locke ignore orders not to proceed into Soviet airspace and retrieve information from a double agent. On their return home, The Company fires Locke, along with the rest of the Airwolf crew and they demand "The Lady" be handed over immediately.
70	14	"Ground Zero"	Alan Simmonds	Michael Mercer	May 1, 1987	0915
Jo is kidnapped by a Japanese businessman and forced to fly him to a nuclear power plant. St. John discovers that the man was a Japanese pilot, shot down in World War II by his father, and he seeks revenge.
71	15	"Flowers of the Mountain"	Randy Bradshaw	Stephen Ainsworth	May 8, 1987	0913
St. John is testing a new military aircraft called the "Viper", but something goes wrong with the plane and bails out before it crashes. After it is revealed that the company who engineered the plane has made a lemon and just wants a quick military sale, St. John tries to expose their scheme but quickly finds himself on the run after the company sends hit men after him.
72	16	"The Key"	J. Barry	Rick Drew	May 15, 1987	0916
Anti-nuclear protestors seize nuclear missiles in both the U.S. and the U.S.S.R. The group threatens to detonate them unless both countries destroy their nuclear stockpiles. At the same time Airwolf is off the shore of a Scottish island, while Mike infiltrates the group's headquarters to get a code that can stop the plan. Mike gets caught and the protest group's leader is killed by his partner. The partner drugs Mike to get him to give up Airwolf's location. Hawke frees Mike before he talks.
73	17	"On the Double"	Ken Jubenvill	Frank Kniest	May 22, 1987	0917
Mike's near twin, an East German pilot, will appear at a European air show and Mike has to replace him, while he is debriefed. Things get complicated, with a schedule change, and Mike has to rush his mission training. At the air show the Airwolf team find that the East Germans are on to the agent and have imprisoned his wife until he completes his part in the air show.
74	18	"Storm Warning"	Brad Turner	Michael Mercer	May 29, 1987	0918
In a war-torn South American country, Airwolf must rescue Hawke's friend, Jack, from a local General. Hawke and Mike break in, while Locke uses Airwolf to provide cover. Unfortunately, Jack is already dead, leaving the mystery of where some smuggled money might have gone unsolved.
75	19	"The Golden One"	George Erschbamer	Ray Hoagan	July 3, 1987	0919
An Afghan rebel wants military weapons and Jo Santini. Meanwhile Hawke and Jo are testing Airwolf when Jo gets a message. A former boyfriend wants to see her, and asks her to visit him in Afghanistan. She does go, unknowingly walking into a trap.
76	20	"The Puppet Master"	Zale Dalen	Jordan Nicht, Gwen Tulpa	July 10, 1987	0921
Locke falls for a beautiful woman, who works for the Ridgemont Institute. The Institute is run by a former employee of the F.I.R.M. who was a mind control expert. When Kate shows Locke her workplace, he is captured and an implant is used to gain control of him. He is then sent home, unaware of the control in an attempt to get Airwolf.
77	21	"Malduke"	Ken Jubenvill	Michael Mercer	July 17, 1987	0923
Hawke and Mike find out via television that a madman (Dick Van Dyke) wants all diseased people quarantined so they can no longer contaminate the world. Airwolf is sent to investigate. The madman finds out about Airwolf and threatens to poison the Pacific if it is used against him.
78	22	"Poppy Chain"	Ken Jubenvill	Chris Haddock	July 24, 1987	0920
In Laos, Mike tries to capture one of the world's largest opium suppliers. After he fails, Hawke, Jo, and Mike are sent on separate missions to stop portions of the drug lords operation.
79	23	"Flying Home"	Brad Turner	Rick Drew, Chris Haddock, Jana Veverka	July 31, 1987	0922
Hawke and Mike investigate stolen plutonium, while Jo's dad lets her know that he is dying. The guys find out that an employee was blackmailed into the theft by neo-Nazis who want a nuclear weapon.
80	24	"Welcome to Paradise"	J. Barry	James S. Hughs	August 7, 1987	0924
Hawke ends up helping an old friend, who owns an aircraft charter service, at the friend's wife request. They find him shot dead. They go after the man responsible, who wants the land for his lumber scheme.
