= Off the Rails =

Off the Rails may refer to:

== Film ==
- Off the Rails (1921 film), a German silent drama film
- Off the Rails (2016 film), an American documentary film about Darius McCollum
- Off the Rails (2021 film), a British comedy-drama film

== Music ==
- Off the Rails (song), a 2025 single by Benee
- Off the Rails, a song by Brantley Gilbert from Tattoos

== Television ==
- Off the Rails (TV series), an Irish fashion magazine show
- Off the Rails: A Love Story, a New Zealand railway documentary and travelogue series
- "Off the Rails" (Star Wars: Young Jedi Adventures), an episode of Star Wars: Young Jedi Adventures

== Other uses ==
- Off the Rails, a Railway Series book about Gordon the Big Engine
- Thrillville: Off the Rails, a theme park simulation video game
- Off the Rails (play), an adaptation of Shakespeare's Measure for Measure from a Native American perspective by Randy Reinholz
