= Reinholz =

Reinholz is a German surname. Notable people with the surname include:

- Art Reinholz (1903–1980), American baseball player
- Randy Reinholz (born 1961), Native American director, playwright, and professor

== See also ==
- Reinhold
