= Airwolf =

American action military drama television series (1984–1987)

- Genre: Action; Military drama
- Created by: Donald P. Bellisario
- Starring: Jan-Michael Vincent; Ernest Borgnine; Alex Cord; Jean Bruce Scott
- Theme music composer: Sylvester Levay
- Composers: Sylvester Levay (S1–3); Udi Harpaz (S2–3)
- Countries of origin: United States; Canada (S4)
- Original language: English
- No. of seasons: 4
- No. of episodes: 79 (first-run); 80 (syndication); (list of episodes)

Production
- Running time: 48 minutes (CBS episodes); 45 minutes (USA Network episodes)
- Production companies: Belisarius Productions; Universal Television; Atlantis Communications (1987); MCA TV (1987)

Original release
- Network: CBS (1984–1986); USA (1987)
- Release: January 22, 1984 – August 7, 1987

Airwolf is an American action military drama television series. It centers on a high-technology attack helicopter, code-named Airwolf, and its crew. They undertake various exotic missions, many involving espionage, with a Cold War theme. It was created by Donald P. Bellisario, who initially explored the concept through a Magnum, P.I. backdoor pilot, and ran four seasons from January 22, 1984, until August 7, 1987.

The main cast for the first three seasons is Jan-Michael Vincent, Ernest Borgnine, Alex Cord, Deborah Pratt (who departed after season two when her husband Bellisario left the series), and Jean Bruce Scott (who became a regular in seasons two and three). The program originally aired on CBS and was cancelled after the third season. USA Network picked up the show for a fourth season that was completely recast, with Jan-Michael Vincent having only a minor role in the first episode. The fourth season was filmed in Canada, with the aerial scenes relying heavily on stock footage or repeated footage from the first three seasons.

The musical score was composed and conducted mainly by Sylvester Levay.

== Plot ==
The fictional Airwolf is an advanced prototype supersonic helicopter with stealth capabilities and a formidable arsenal. Airwolf was designed by Charles Henry Moffet (David Hemmings)—a genius with a psychopathic taste for torturing and killing women—and built by the Firm, a division of the Central Intelligence Agency (a play on the term "the Company", a nickname for the CIA). Moffet and his crew steal Airwolf during a live-fire weapons test. During the theft, Moffet opens fire on the Firm's bunker, killing a United States senator and seriously injuring Firm deputy director Michael Coldsmith-Briggs III (codenamed Archangel). Moffet takes Airwolf to Libya, for acts of aggression such as sinking an American destroyer, as a service for Muammar Gaddafi, in exchange for giving Moffet sanctuary on Libyan soil.

Archangel recruits the reclusive Stringfellow Hawke (Vincent), a former test pilot during the development of Airwolf, to recover the gunship. Archangel leaves his assistant Gabrielle Ademaur (Belinda Bauer)—who becomes Hawke's love interest—at Hawke's cabin to brief him for his mission. One week later, after an undercover operative in Libya is killed in the line of duty, Gabrielle is sent in undercover and Hawke is sent in sooner than originally planned. With the assistance of pilot and father figure Dominic Santini (Borgnine), Hawke finds and recovers Airwolf, but Gabrielle is tortured in the desert and is left to die by Moffet. Hawke obliterates Moffet with a hail of missiles from Airwolf before returning to the US. Instead of returning the gunship, Hawke and Santini claim to Archangel that they have booby-trapped Airwolf and have hidden it from the Firm in a secret location known as "the Lair", a large natural cave in the remote "Valley of the Gods", actually filmed in visually similar Monument Valley. Hawke refuses to return Airwolf until the Firm can find and recover his brother, St. John (Christopher Connelly), who has been missing in action since the Vietnam War. To obtain access to Airwolf, Archangel offers Hawke protection from other government agencies which might try to recover Airwolf; in return, Hawke and Santini must fly missions of national importance for the Firm.

The Firm, during the first three seasons, serves as both ally and enemy for Hawke and Santini; when an opportunity to seize Airwolf arises, Firm operatives often take it. The first season of the series is dark, arc-driven, and quite reflective of the contemporary Cold War, with the Firm personnel distinctly dressed in white, implicitly boasting that "wearing white hats" distinguished them as good instead of evil. Hawke remains unconvinced, and Santini is skeptical. Early episodes detail the efforts of the US government to recover Airwolf from Hawke, who is officially charged with having stolen it. Because CBS wanted to make the series more family-oriented, the program was transformed during season two into a more lighthearted show, with Hawke and Santini portrayed as cooperative partners with the Firm. This persisted into the fourth season with the newly introduced "Company" and the new crew of Airwolf.

== Episodes ==
| Season | Episodes | Originally released | | |
| Season | Episodes | First released | Last released | Network |
|---|---|---|---|---|
| 1 | 12 | January 22, 1984 | April 14, 1984 | CBS |
| 2 | 22 | September 22, 1984 | April 13, 1985 | CBS |
| 3 | 22 | September 28, 1985 | March 29, 1986 | CBS |
| 4 | 24 | January 23, 1987 | August 7, 1987 | USA |

== Production ==
The series ran for 55 episodes on CBS in the United States in 1984 through 1986, and an additional 24 episodes, with a new cast and production company, aired on the USA Network in 1987, for a total of 79 episodes. A reedited version (produced in Germany) of the first episode was also released on home video in the UK and several other countries; it received a theatrical release in Indonesia. The show was broadcast in several international markets. Parts of the series were filmed in Monument Valley, Utah.

=== Magnum, P.I. connection ===
Creator Donald P. Bellisario first toyed with the idea of the adventures of an ace combat pilot in a third-season episode of Magnum, P.I. titled "Two Birds of a Feather" (1983), starring William Lucking, which, in turn, was inspired by several episodes of Bellisario's Tales of the Gold Monkey—"Legends Are Forever" and "Honor Thy Brother" (1982)—in which Lucking had played a similar character. The Magnum episode was intended as a backdoor pilot, but a series was not commissioned. Bellisario heavily reworked the idea, and the final result was Airwolf.

=== Season 1 ===
Airwolf premiered on CBS January 22, 1984, as the lead-out from Super Bowl XVIII. It was a late-season replacement with a pilot episode completed but not yet aired. A decision was made to order an initial eight episodes. Airwolf ranked in the top 60 of TV shows towards the bottom while sitcom shows such as The Golden Girls, The Cosby Show, Cheers and Family Ties all remained at the top of ratings. Despite this, the ratings were good enough to extend the season with a 'back nine' order to bring season one up to twelve episodes in total, with the pilot making up two of those episodes. Much footage shot for the pilot episode was re-used by editors throughout the show which helped reduce production costs for aerial footage and special effects (a process which would become integral to the production of season four).

The two pilot episodes were later edited into a theatrical-style movie for home video release titled Airwolf: The Movie, and included a number of differences such as later-style music from the show, shorter scenes and dialogue changes for an older audience. It has since been released on DVD and Blu-ray as a stand-alone title separate to the TV series.

=== Season 2 ===
Season two was commissioned for thirteen episodes initially with a later 'back nine' order for the remaining nine episodes to complete the season.

To improve ratings, the studio wanted to add a regular female character and jettison the dark and moody tales of international espionage. This was accomplished at the start of the second season with the addition of Caitlin O'Shannessy (Jean Bruce Scott) and new stories that were domestic and more action oriented. These changes proved unsuccessful, however, and while production costs remained high, creator Bellisario left both the studio and the series after Season 2. Bellisario's then-wife, Deborah Pratt, also left at that time (she was nearly three months pregnant with their daughter, Troian, as Season 2 drew to a close). Series star Jan-Michael Vincent's problems with alcoholism also contributed to the show's problems.

=== Season 3 ===
Season three was produced in the same manner as season two (13 episodes, then an additional 9). Bernard Kowalski stepped in as executive producer for the third season, replacing the departed Bellisario. The show's loss of original production staff, ratings decline, escalating problems behind the scenes, and significant increases in production costs led to CBS selling off the show to the new USA Cable Network.

=== Season 4 ===
The USA Network funded a fourth season in 1987, to be produced in Canada by Atlantis and The Arthur Company (owned by Arthur L. Annecharico) in association with MCA. This was intended to increase the number of episodes to make the show eligible for broadcast syndication so that a return could be generated against the series' overall production costs. The original cast was written out of the fourth season: Jan-Michael Vincent appears in a first transitional episode; a body double for Ernest Borgnine seen only from the back represented Santini, who was killed off in an explosion; Archangel was said to have suddenly been assigned overseas. "The Firm" was replaced by "the Company"; no mention was made of Caitlin. Stringfellow's brother St. John Hawke, (now played by Barry Van Dyke), was suddenly revealed to be alive, having been working for many years as a deep undercover agent for American intelligence, contradicting characterizations in the previous three seasons. St. John replaced Stringfellow as the central character. Production moved to Vancouver, British Columbia, Canada on a reduced budget that was less than one-third of the original CBS budget. The production crew no longer had access to the original Airwolf helicopter, and all in-flight shots were recycled from earlier seasons; the original full-size studio mockup was re-dressed and used for all interior shots. Actress Michele Scarabelli, who played Jo Santini, said in a Starlog magazine interview that all 24 scripts were in place before the cast arrived, leaving the actors little room to develop their characters.

== Cast ==
Season 1 (CBS, 1984) – two-hour pilot and ten additional episodes.

- Jan-Michael Vincent – Stringfellow Hawke (Captain, U.S. Army) (noted as 34 years of age in the 5th episode)
- Ernest Borgnine – Dominic Santini (the owner of Santini Air)
- Alex Cord – Michael Coldsmith Briggs III (deputy director of CIA division named "The Firm;" code name: Archangel)
- Deborah Pratt – Marella, Archangel's assistant

Seasons 2–3 (CBS, 1984–1986) – two seasons of 22 episodes each.

- Vincent, Borgnine, Cord, Pratt (semi-regular, not season three), and
- Jean Bruce Scott – Caitlin O'Shannessy (former helicopter pilot of the Texas Highway Patrol)

Season 4 (USA Network, mid-1987) – 24 episodes, bringing the total hours to 80.

- Barry Van Dyke – St. John Hawke (reserve Major, U.S. Army)
- Michele Scarabelli – Jo Santini (inherited Santini Air from her uncle Dominic Santini after his death)
- Geraint Wyn Davies – Mike Rivers (Major, U.S. Air Force)
- Anthony Sherwood – Jason Locke (a core agent in the government agency called "The Company")
- William B. Davis – Newman (Locke's supervisor in the company; Newman was played by Ernie Prentice just in the first episode, "Blackjack")

== Airwolf helicopter ==
Airwolf (fictional info)
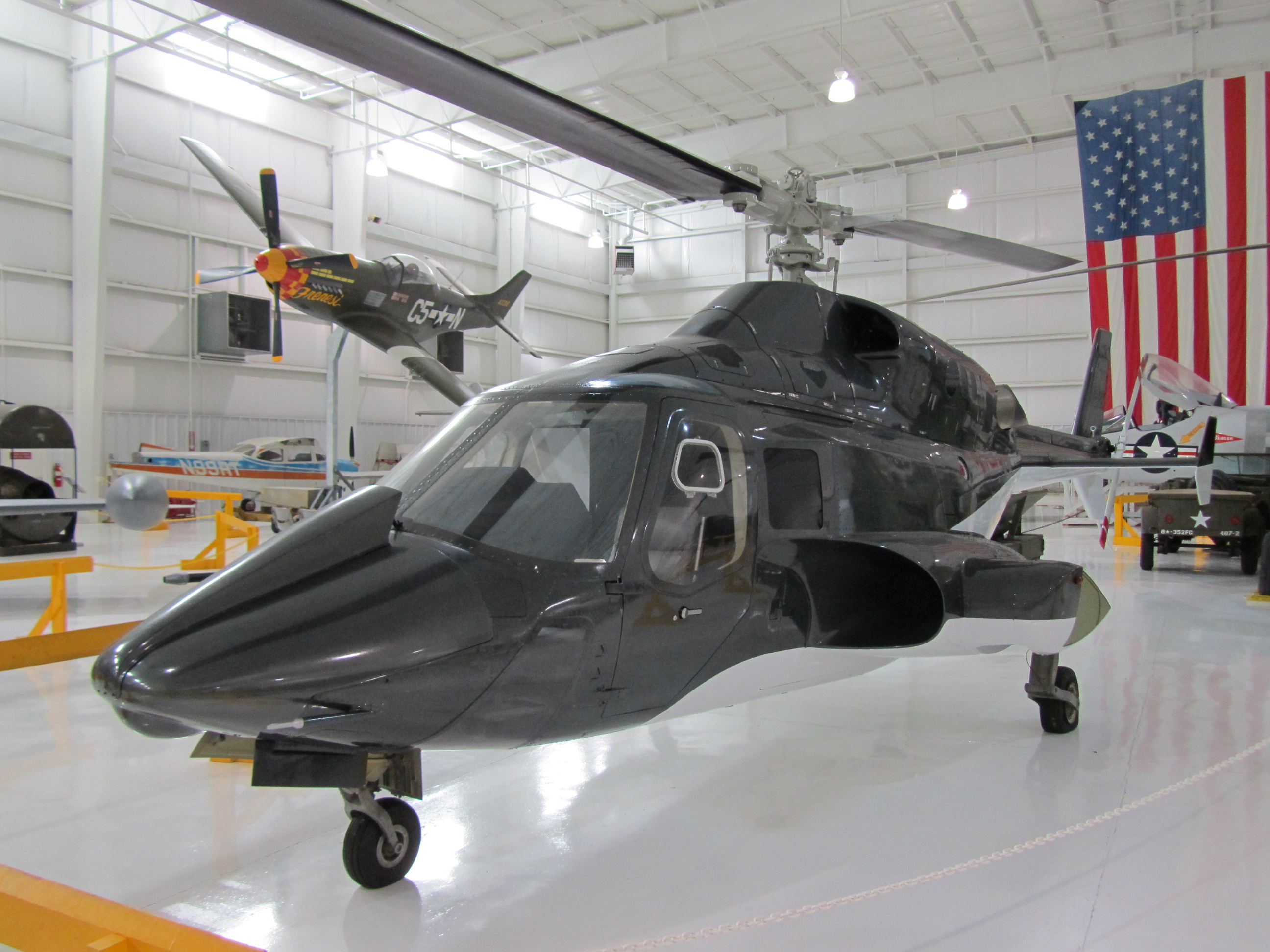
- Full-size replica of Airwolf at the Tennessee Museum of Aviation in Sevierville, Tennessee

General information
- Type: Disguised military helicopter
- Manufacturer: "The Firm"
- Designer: Dr. Charles Henry Moffet
- Primary user: Stringfellow Hawke
- Number built: 1

History
- First flight: 1983
- Developed from: Bell 222

The flight-capable Airwolf helicopter was a cosmetically modified Bell 222, serial number 47085 and tail number N3176S, sometimes unofficially called a Bell 222A. During filming of the series, the helicopter was owned by Jetcopters, Inc. of Van Nuys, California. Andrew Probert designed the Airwolf uniform insignia patch worn by the flight crew members, a snarling bat-winged wolf's head wearing a sheepskin.

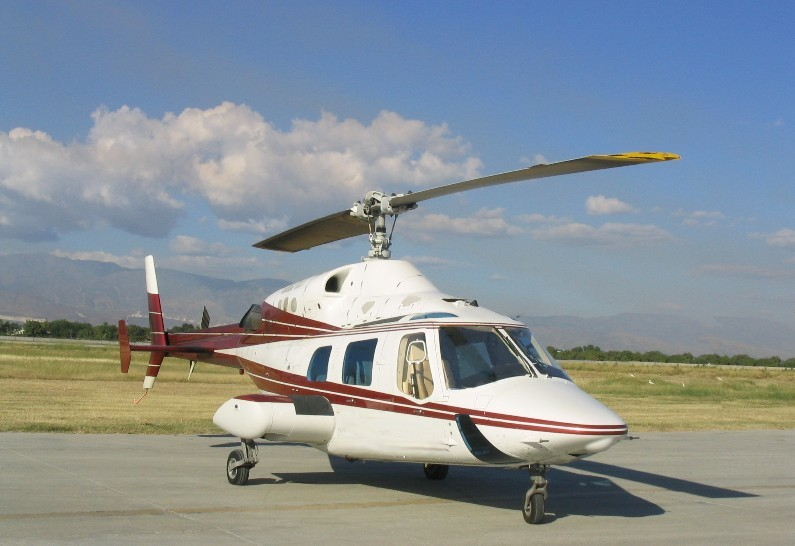
A Bell 222

After the show was canceled, the modifications were removed from the aircraft and are now owned by a private collector.

The helicopter was repainted and eventually sold to the German helicopter charter company, Hubschrauber-Sonder-Dienst (aka HSD Luftrettung and Blue Helicopter Alliance), and given the registration number D-HHSD. While operating as an air ambulance, the helicopter crashed into a mountain in fog on June 6, 1992, killing all three occupants.

A new, full-size replica of the Airwolf helicopter was created by Steven W. Stull for display in the short-lived Helicopter Headquarters museum in Pigeon Forge, Tennessee that opened in August 2006, using a non-flying Bell 222 with molds taken directly from the originals used in the show. The museum was unsuccessful, and offered the replica for sale through eBay. The replica was housed between 2007 and 2015 in the Tennessee Museum of Aviation in Sevierville, Tennessee. It was then sold to a private collector in California, having been further modified at West Coast Customs during September 2015. The replica was then placed on top of a mansion in Bel Air, California.

=== Appearance ===
Airwolf was painted "Phantom Gray Metallic" (DuPont Imron 5031X) on top, and a custom pearl-gray (almost white) on the bottom, in a countershaded pattern. The craft was also fitted with various prop modifications, such as "turbojet" engines and intakes, an in-air refueling nozzle and blister cowling on the nose, retractable machine guns at the wingtips, and a retractable rocket launcher, known as the "ADF Pod" (ADF standing for All Directional Firing, as the pod could rotate 180 degrees to fire at targets at the sides—90 degrees to the left, forward, or 90 degrees to the right) on its belly.

The look of the modifications was designed by Andrew Probert, and they were first applied to the non-flying mock-up (built from the body of the very first Bell 222, serial number 47001). From this mock-up molds were made so that parts could be made to FAA specifications before they were added to the flying helicopter. After the maiden flight with the modifications, primary pilot David Jones told the producer that "It flies better now than before!"

The machine guns mounted on the side of the landing gear sponsons were mock-ups that used spark plugs and fuel to simulate gun firing. Other modifications were implied with Foley and sets; the interior sets were of a fantastical high-tech nature, and there were implied "stealth" noise-reducing capabilities with creative use of sound effects. On the show, the deployment of the weapons systems was usually shown via close-ups of the action; in reality, these close-ups were produced on props off-site, while the non-moving prop components were attached to the aircraft by a technician in the field or at the JetCopters hangar.

The concept behind Airwolf was a super-fast and armed helicopter that could "blend in" by appearing to be civilian and non-military in origin, a "wolf in sheep's clothing". Airwolf's insignia patch (also designed by Probert) as worn by the flight crew was a snarling wolf's head with gossamer wings that appears to be wearing a sheepskin complete with the head of a lamb over the wolf's forehead. Airwolf is sometimes referred to in-show as "The Lady" by Santini and Hawke.

=== Specifications ===
Airwolf's "Design Specifications"
| Range | 950 miles (1,530 km) (armed crew of 3); Midair refuel capable 1,450 miles (2,330 km) long range (crew of 2) |
| Flight Ceiling | 11,000 feet (3,400 m) unpressurized 89,000 feet (27,000 m) pressurized Third season: 100,000 feet (30,000 m) pressurized |
| Speed | 300 kn (560 km/h; 350 mph) (conventional); Mach 1+ (turbo thrusters); Mach 2 Maximum speed |
| Wing guns | 30 mm cannon (×2).50 BMG Chain guns (×4); Firing up to 40 rounds per sec. |
| Missiles and 'Heavy weapons' | First season: AGM-12 Bullpup missiles AIM-9 Sidewinder missiles AIM-95 Agile missiles AGM-45 Nuclear Shrike missiles AGM-114 Hellfire missiles Paveway bombs Second and Third seasons: (ADF Pod launched); M712 Copperhead shells (×6); FIM-43 Redeye missiles (×12); AGM-114 Hellfire missiles (×6) (Auxiliary bay launched); AIM-4 Falcon missiles (x4); Fourth season: Red Laser |
| Defensive systems | Sunburst anti-missile Flares; Chaff (radar countermeasure) anti-missile decoys Bullet-proof armored fuselage Learning flight/combat computer Radar/Radio Jammer; 90% Radar absorbent skin IR suppressor (IRCM) |

Airwolf vs. Bell 222
| | Bell 222 | Airwolf |
|---|---|---|
| Crew | 2 (pilot & copilot) | 2–3 (pilot(s) & weapons technician) |
| Passengers | 5–6 | 1–2 (non-crew may use the copilot seat and/or a seat behind the technician's seat) |
| Length | 49.54 ft (15.10 m) | |
| Height | 11.68 ft (3.56 m) | |
| Weight | 4,555 lb (2,066 kg) | unspecified |
| Speed | 149 mph (240 km/h) | 345 mph (555 km/h) conventional, Mach 1+ with turbo thrusters |
| Range | 373 mi (600 km) | 950–1,450 mi (1,530–2,330 km) |
| Ceiling | 12,800 ft (3,900 m) | 11,000 ft (3,400 m) unpressurized 100,000 ft (30,000 m) pressurized |
| Power (×2) | 618 hp (461 kW) | 45,000 lb-ft (turbo thrusters) |

=== Models ===
==== Static-display models ====
Over the years a number of licensed Airwolf models have been available.

- Ertl 5" (~1:100 scale) die-cast toy model (1984) – available carded (alone) and boxed (with a Santini Air helicopter and jeep)
- Ertl 14" (~1:36 scale) die-cast toy model (1984) – available boxed
- AMT/Ertl 1:48 scale plastic model kit (1984) – many knock-offs are also available
- Charawheels (Hot Wheels in Japan) 94 mm (1:160) scale die-cast toy model (2004)
- Aoshima 1:48 scale die-cast collector's model (2005–2007) – available in cobalt blue ("normal"), black ("Limited"), weathered (2006), and matte black (2007)
- Aoshima 1:48 scale plastic kit (2009) – superior in moulding and detail to earlier ERTL/AMT models.
- Hot Wheels "Pop Culture" series die-cast toy model (2025), about 3" long, claimed 1:64 scale

==== Flyable models ====
- Airwolf 1:19 scale Fuselage kit (unknown) – designed to fit the T-Rex RC helicopter
- Cox gas-engined Airwolf (1988). Non-RC. Engine powered a small rotor which lifted the model up; a larger free-wheeling rotor auto-rotated the model down when the fuel ran out. Location of touchdown at the mercy of prevailing winds.
- Different fuselage kits by German RC helicopters manufacturer Vario with optional functional retractable machine guns (firing blanks).

== Music ==
The theme music for the show's opening titles was composed by Sylvester Levay, who also scored most of the music in the show's early episodes. Udi Harpaz, Ian Freebairn-Smith and Bernardo Segáll contributed scores to later episodes.

== Books ==
During the original series run, two books were published. Both were written by Ron Renauld and are titled Airwolf and Trouble From Within, respectively. A graphic novel was published in August 2015, titled Airwolf Airstrikes, which recasts Archangel as a woman, and Dominic Santini's son, who is black.

== Merchandise ==
- Airwolf Themes: 2CD Special Limited Edition (arrangements closely based on the original TV soundtrack - officially licensed)
- Airwolf Extended Themes: 2CD Special Limited Edition (arrangements closely based on the original TV soundtrack - officially licensed)
- Airwolf: The Wonderweapon (German CD soundtrack)
- Airwolf Replica Helmet (fully functioning)
- Models of the Airwolf helicopter

A series of tie-in novels was printed by Star, adapted from the scripts of various episodes, and coloring books for children (printed in the UK by World Publishing), and a UK annual, which, though produced in 1985 (to cover 1986), was based around the first season. For several years, the children's TV comic magazine Look-In ran an Airwolf comic strip to tie in with the original UK broadcast of the series.

=== Video games ===
- Airwolf (Commodore 64, Commodore 16), published by Elite. There were unrealized plans to rename the European-produced Airwolf C64 game as Fort Apocalypse 2.
- Airwolf (Amstrad CPC), published by Elite, popular in Europe.
- Airwolf (ZX Spectrum), published by Elite, popular in the UK and Europe.
- Airwolf (BBC Micro and Atari 8-bit computers) by Elite, adapted from Blue Thunder by Richard Wilcox Software
- Airwolf (Arcade), by Kyugo Boueki.
- Airwolf (Family Computer), by Kyugo Boueki, released in Japan only
- Airwolf (Nintendo Entertainment System), by Acclaim.
- Airwolf II (ZX Spectrum, Commodore 64, Commodore 16, Amstrad CPC and BBC Micro), published by Elite.
- Super Airwolf (Mega Drive/Genesis), by Kyugo Boueki, released in the U.S. as Cross Fire

== Home media ==
Universal Studios has released the first 3 seasons of Airwolf on DVD in regions 1, 2, and 4. Earlier releases consisted of single episodes on VHS (double episodes in the UK and some countries, edited together into "movie" format; later in the UK, a selection of first and second season episodes were released by Playback on both VHS and DVD), including a United Kingdom 18 certificate cut of the pilot episode, presented as a standalone film (reshuffling and reworking many scenes, and removing much of the continuity ties with the following series, as well as incorporating footage from the first-season episode "Mad Over Miami", and with profanity that was not present in the aired version).

Season 4 was released in Region 1 on February 1, 2011.

On September 6, 2011, Shout! Factory released Airwolf: The Movie on DVD in Region 1 for the first time. This single-disc set features the two-hour pilot tele-film fully restored and uncensored. It also contains special features including a new interview with Ernest Borgnine.

On March 8, 2016, it was announced that Mill Creek Entertainment had acquired the rights to the series and would release Airwolf - The Complete Series on DVD and Blu-ray for the first time on May 3, 2016. They also re-released the first season on DVD on the same day.

Fabulous Films have released an all-new, High Definition Series 1–3 Blu-ray (Region B) box-set for the UK market during April 2014. The new HD transfers were created by Universal Studios.

Fabulous Films have since released single season Blu-ray (Region B) box sets, plus the equivalent DVD (Region 2) season box sets including, for the first time, a Canadian Airwolf II Season 4 set from the newly restored prints.

== See also ==
- Blue Thunder (helicopter)
- Blue Thunder (film)
- Blue Thunder (TV series)
