= Off the Rails (play) =

Off the Rails is a stage adaptation of William Shakespeare's Measure for Measure by Randy Reinholz, a Choctaw Native American playwright. The play was written in 2015, and inspired by Reinholz's wife and co-founder of the Native Voices theatre company at the Autry Museum of the American West, Jean Bruce Scott.

Although Off the Rails follows the plot of Measure for Measure, infamous for being one of Shakespeare's problem plays, the power struggles between the characters help rather than hurt the play's ability to send a powerful message by accentuating the racist treatment of Native Americans. Reinholz utilizes specific projection images and traditional Native American tribal songs and language in the script of the play in order to make a political statement about the horrors of Indian boarding schools.

== Synopsis ==
=== Prologue ===
Set in the mid 1880s, the play opens with an active main street featuring an Indian boarding school/jail, Stewed Prunes Saloon, and brothel. Momaday, a love-struck 16 year–old Pawnee Native American, and Grandfather, also Pawnee, introduce their story of removal from their homeland Kit Tuk Creek to Genoa, Nebraska. This scene leads into the love story between Momaday and Caitlin, a 16-year-old Irish orphan. They secretly meet in the street to talk, occasionally in the forbidden Pawnee language. It is revealed that Caitlin is pregnant with Momaday’s child and the couple have been married in ‘Pawnee way’, rather than Christian ceremony, thereby casting their intercourse as an unlawful act in Genoa.

=== Act I ===
Act I, Scene I begins with Lady Overdone’s Saloon filled with raucous people polishing their routines for the upcoming auditions for Buffalo Bill’s Wild West Show. In juxtaposition, we see the mayor or Genoa, General Gatt, and his right-hand man, McDonald, in the boarding school office. General Gatt claims that he will be hunting the totonka and will therefore resign his position to Angelo, a captain in the Army.

Under Angelo’s instruction, Momaday has been sentenced to death for fornicating with Caitlin before any Christian marriage. Reacting to this news, Alexie, a tribal chairman’s son, and Caitlin search for hope in Momaday’s “chaste and pure” sister, Isabel. Upon Alexie’s visit to Isabel, he shares the bad news of Momaday’s sentence, prompting a discussion of the worth of the Native Indian in Genoa. The Pawnee woman within Isabel agrees to plea with Angelo, hoping that her Christian way of life will persuade him to free Momaday. After Isabel begs for her brother’s release proves unsuccessful, Angelo speaks to the audience about his lustful thoughts towards Isabel.

Back at the Saloon, Overdone’s auditions are also proving unsuccessful until Mariana is encouraged to sing her song “Whoa Willie, Take Your Time.” Caitlin then visits the Saloon in search of a place to stay until her beloved Momaday is safe.

Upon Isabel’s second visit to Angelo, a proposition is made: Angelo informs Isabel that her brother will be set free in exchange for her virginity. Isabel refuses immediately. Meanwhile, trapped in a prison cell, Momaday speaks and sings to Grandfather, asking for guidance. Isabel soon visits her grief-stricken brother and explains Angelo’s twisted proposal. Overdone enters, and out of disgust, proposes a plan to save both Momaday’s life and his sister’s chastity: Isabel will agree to Angelo’s deal, however, unbeknownst to Angelo, Overdone will switch Isabel with Angelo’s former fiancé Mariana.

=== Act II ===
The second act opens with a messy and disorganised rehearsal of musicians and saloon folk. A disguised General Gatt and McDonald are hidden in a secret room rehearsing a speech regarding a new railroad. McDonald expresses the urgency of the apparently missing Kiowa boys and Potowatomi girls that have escaped the ghastly boarding school and its terrible conditions, to which General Gatt responds with more railroad excitement. That evening, Mariana, Isabel, and Overdone exchange keys to the garden in which the plan will unfold.

Meanwhile, the Sheriff searches for a successful hangman for Momaday’s upcoming execution. Pryor and B’stard claim they are suitable for the job and begin to work together in preparation, while Overdone pleas for the execution to be delayed.

After reading Angelo’s ledger book, McDonald discovers him stealing from the boarding schools. Angelo has also gone back on his word and, despite believing he has taken Isabel’s virginity, continues with Momaday’s execution. Overdone then carries out a new plot against Angelo by seeking a corpse’s head at the prison to fool him into believing Momaday has already been beheaded.

Upon General Gatt’s return to Genoa, Overdone rallies the people to confront the General with Angelo’s crimes. Angelo of course denies these accusations but is proven guilty and sentenced to death. In response, Isabel and Mariana plea for Angelo’s life, and he is instead required to marry Mariana as was previously arranged. To Isabel and Caitlin’s delight, Momaday is then uncovered and shown to be alive, invoking confusion and celebration amongst Genoa. General Gatt reveals to the town the exciting news of the upcoming railroad, as well as promising improvements to the destructive boarding school. The play ends with Buffalo Bill entering the scene and taking a photo with the cast. There is then a closing a musical number and tribal song.

== Production history ==
=== Los Angeles ===
The original production held previews February 25 – 26, 2015. The production directed by Chris Anthony opened at the Wells Fargo Theater at the Autry National Center of the American West in Los Angeles and ran from February 27 – March 15, 2015.

=== Oregon Shakespeare Festival ===
A new production directed by Bill Rauch ran at the Oregon Shakespeare Festival from July 27 through October 28, 2017.

== Characters ==
=== Major characters ===
- Grandfather – of Pawnee descent; Traditional keeper of the stories
- Momaday – of Pawnee descent; 16 year-old who marries Caitlin through Pawnee ceremony and gets her pregnant; is sentenced to death because of this
- Caitlin – of Irish descent; 16 year-old Irish orphan who lost her father in the Indian wars and her mother in childbirth; attends the same boarding school as Momaday, where she falls in love with him
- Madame Overdone – of Lakota and French descent; owns the saloon/brothel
- Alexie – of Creek descent; smooth talking son of a tribal chairman
- Pryor – bartender for Overdone’s saloon
- Cowboy – “campy cowboy”
- Mariana – Angelo’s jilted fiancée who lost her family in Indian wars; dancehall girl at Overdone’s saloon
- General Gatt – Mayor of Genoa
- James McDonald – of Choctaw descent; counselor to General Gatt
- Angelo – army captain who rules Genoa while General Gatt is away
- Sheriff – of African American descent; “good hearted person in a bad job”
- Isabel – of Pawnee descent; Momaday’s older sister who goes away to become a teacher
- Musician/Buffalo Bill Cody

=== Minor characters ===
- Musicians
- Traditional Dancer
- Saloon Girls
- Powwow Drummers
