= Airwolf (video game) =

1987 video game

- NES box art
- Developers: Kyugo (Arcade, Genesis); Beam Software (NES)
- Publishers: Kyugo (Arcade, Japan, Genesis, Japan/US); United Artists Theatre Amusements (Arcade, US); Acclaim (NES)
- Platforms: Arcade, Amstrad CPC, Atari 8-bit, BBC Micro, Commodore 16, Commodore 64, Famicom, NES, Genesis, ZX Spectrum
- Release: Arcade; September 1987; Famicom: JP: December 24, 1988; NES: PAL: August 1988; NA: June 1989; Genesis: JP: March 29, 1991; NA: 1991
- Genre: Scrolling shooter
- Mode: Single-player
- Arcade system: Kyugo

Airwolf is a series of shooter video games based on the TV series of the same name. The first game based on the series was released for the ZX Spectrum by Elite Systems in 1984. The game also was released on the BBC Micro, Commodore 16, Commodore 64, Amstrad CPC, and Atari 8-bit computers. A sequel, Airwolf II, was released in 1986.

An arcade game based on the series was developed by Kyugo and released in 1987. A Famicom port of this game was released in 1988. Kyugo also developed a Sega Genesis game based on the series, called Super Airwolf. In the US, this game was released as CrossFire without the Airwolf license or theme song. This was not the first CrossFire game from Kyugo. They had previously developed a CrossFire game for the Famicom, which was an action platformer. This game was going to be released in the US, but the release was cancelled.

The NES version was not a port of the arcade game, but was instead developed by Beam Software and released by Acclaim in 1988. The game places the player in the cockpit of the Airwolf helicopter attempting to shoot down enemy aircraft and rescue prisoners.

== Gameplay ==
=== NES ===
The game contains twenty missions, each with the objective being to rescue prisoners being held captive in enemy bases. The layout of each level changes as the player progresses. There are three types of bases:

- Home base - the player can refuel the Airwolf and repair damage it may have taken.
- Enemy airfield - this is where many of the enemy craft take off from. The base can be destroyed, which lessens the number of enemy aircraft pursuing the player.
- Prisoner base - this is where the prisoners are being held. To rescue them, the player must successfully land Airwolf and rescue the prisoner.

Airwolf is equipped with missiles and a machine gun in order to fend off enemy craft and their weapons. In order to successfully complete a mission, the player must rescue all prisoners and reach the border of the level without losing all of their lives.

== Reception ==
Reception

Award
Publication	Award
Crash	Crash Smash

In Japan, Game Machine listed Airwolf on their November 1, 1987 issue as being the fourteenth most-successful table arcade unit of the month. Classic Home Video Games 1985-1988 praised the musical score of the NES version, but described the gameplay as "dull".
