= Randy Reinholz =

Choctaw Native American director, playwright and professor (born 1961)

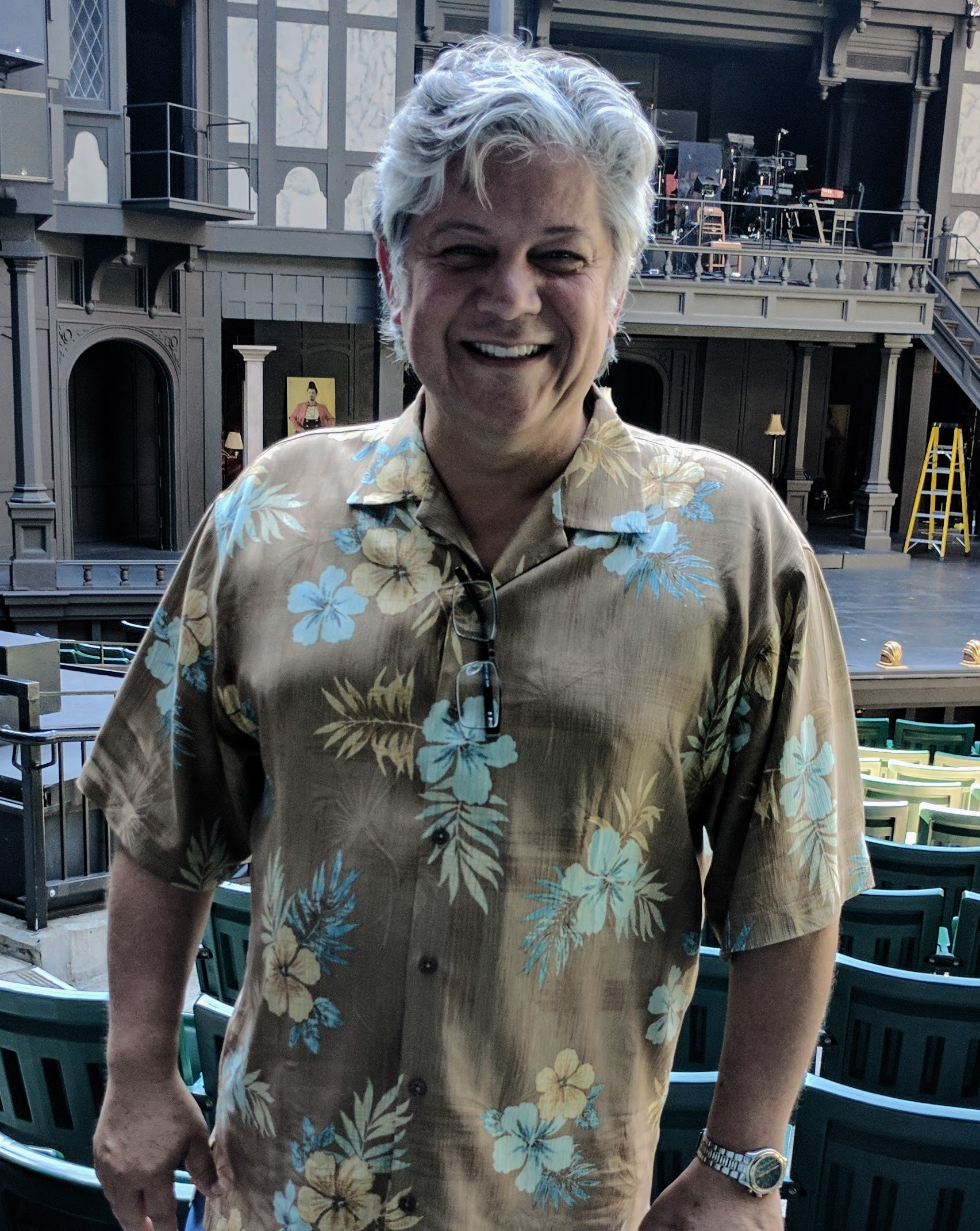
- Randy Reinholz at the Oregon Shakespeare Festival, July 29, 2017
- Born: December 11, 1961 (age 64); St. Louis, Missouri, U.S.
- Education: William Jewell College (BA); Cornell University (MFA)
- Occupations: Professor, director, playwright

Randy Reinholz (born December 11, 1961) is a Choctaw Native American director, playwright, and professor.

He is the co-creator of Native Voices, a Los Angeles-based theater company that produces new work by indigenous playwrights.

Reinholz is the director of the School of Theatre, Television, and Film at San Diego State University, located in San Diego, California.

== Early life and education ==
He was born December 11, 1961, in St. Louis, Missouri.

Reinholz received a Bachelor of Arts degree from William Jewell College, located in Liberty, Missouri; and a Master of Fine Arts degree in theatre from Cornell University, located in Ithaca, New York.

He is an enrolled member of the Choctaw Nation. His grandmother was also a member of the Choctaw nation and asked for his enrollment. He learned about his ancestry from his visits with his grandparents who lived in Durant, Oklahoma. Reinholz himself, lived in several small midwest town growing up in Missouri, North Dakota, and Texas.

== Career ==
In 1989, Reinholz played Adam Scott on the NBC soap opera Days of Our Lives.

Reinholz has directed more than seventy-five productions across the U.S., Australia, and Canada.

In 1993, he and his wife, Jean Bruce Scott, co-founded Native Voices, a theatre company at the Autry Museum of the American West dedicated to producing new work by indigenous playwrights.

For a decade, he led the acting program at San Diego State University's School of Theatre, Television, and Film, becoming its director in 2007. In 2012, he was appointed Director of Community Engagement and Innovative Programs for the College of Professional Studies and Fine Arts at SDSU.

Reinholz's play Off the Rails, an adaptation of Shakespeare's Measure for Measure from a Nativeź-American perspective, was produced by Native Voices in 2015. In 2017, it became the first play by a native writer to be presented by the Oregon Shakespeare Festival.
