= Jean Bruce Scott =

American actress

- Occupation: Actress
- Years active: 1981–2003, 2012
- Spouses: Robert Colman (m. 1980; div. 198?); Randy Reinholz (m. 1989)

Jean Bruce Scott is a retired American actress, best known for her role as former Texas Highway Patrol helicopter pilot Caitlin O'Shannessy in the 1984-1987 CBS action thriller television series Airwolf. She had a recurring role as Lieutenant, later Lieutenant Commander, Maggie Poole in seasons 3-8 of Magnum, P.I..

== Early years ==
Scott is the daughter of Ray and Nancy Scott, and she has a sister. Her father was an Army officer and worked for Alyeska Pipeline Service Company. When she was 13 years old she entered a "Girl of the Year" contest sponsored by Teen magazine. Although someone else won the contest, the magazine used her photograph on its cover and featured her in a swimsuit layout. She attended Cal State-Fullerton.

== Career ==
Scott began working as an actor and as a model when she was 14 years old. Her self-described "very commercial look" led to her making commercials for clients that included RCA Communications, Band Aid, Dixie Cups, Pillsbury, and Head and Shoulders.

On television she portrayed Roberta Sloane on St. Elsewhere, Navy Lieutenant Maggie Poole on Magnum, P. I. and Jessica on Days of Our Lives.

In 2007, she worked as the executive director and producer of Native Voices at the Autry, a program devoted to developing and producing new works for the stage by Native American playwrights, and is affiliated with the Autry National Center.

== Personal life ==
Scott married TV writer Robert Colman in 1980 and Randy Reinholz in 1989.

== Filmography ==
=== Television ===
Year	Title	Role	Notes
1980–1982, 2012	Days of Our Lives	Jessica Blake	326 episodes
1983	Knight Rider	Jobina Bruce	Episode: "A Nice, Indecent Little Town"
1982–1988	Magnum, P.I.	LT/LCDR Maggie Poole USN (Naval Intelligence)	11 episodes
1983	Wishman	Karen Kaleb	TV movie
1983–1984	St. Elsewhere	Roberta Sloan	8 episodes
1984–1986	Airwolf	Caitlin O'Shannessy	44 episodes
1985	Peyton Place: The Next Generation	Allison Mackenzie	TV movie - uncredited
1985	Kids Don't Tell	Clare	TV movie
1986	Newhart	Susan Polgar	2 episodes
1987–1988	Matlock	Sylvia Richland	2 episodes
1989	Hardball		Episode: "The Fighting 52nd"
1989	MacGyver	Forest Ranger Liz	Episode: "The Invisible Killer"
1990	Jake and the Fatman	Dr. Keri Donovan	Episode: "You're Driving Me Crazy"
1991	Wishman		motion picture
1999	Beverly Hills, 90210	Mrs. Patch	Episode: "80's Night"
2000–2003	Port Charles	Colleen Russo R.N.	108 episodes
