= Richard Henderson (jurist) =

American pioneer (1735-1785)

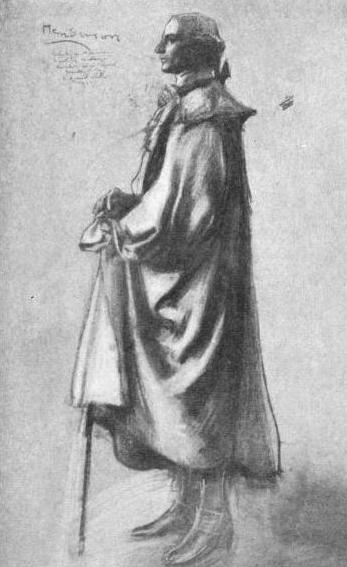
- Richard Henderson, from a painting by T. Gilbert White
- Born: April 20, 1735; Hanover County, Virginia Colony
- Died: January 30, 1785 (aged 49); Williamsboro, North Carolina, US
- Occupations: American jurist, land speculator and politician
- Spouse: Elizabeth Keeling
- Children: 6

Richard Henderson (April 20, 1735 – January 30, 1785) was an American jurist, land speculator, politician and pioneer leader who organized and led the foundational expedition that established Nashville, Tennessee. He is also well known for attempting to create the Transylvania Colony in frontier Kentucky. Henderson County and its seat Henderson, Kentucky, are named for him.

Henderson was born in Virginia Colony, but his family moved to Granville County, North Carolina, when he was a child. There, he studied law and became a member of the bar. He married Elizabeth Keeling, an Englishwoman, in 1763 and had 6 children. Henderson was appointed judge in 1768, but retired in 1773 to pursue land deals. In 1774, he formed the Transylvania Company for that purpose. Between 1775 and 1783, he pursued various land deals in Kentucky, Tennessee, and southwestern Virginia, including the Transylvania Purchase and Colony in western Kentucky and north central Tennessee. The extra-legal deals collapsed by 1783 when voided by the Virginia and North Carolina colonial governments. Henderson's Transylvania settlement was one of the early triggers of the Cherokee–American wars.

After the land deals, he returned to North Carolina and held various legislative and executive positions in the North Carolina government. He died at age 49 at his home in North Carolina.

== Early life and law career ==
Henderson was born in Hanover County, Virginia Colony, on April 20, 1735. His parents were Samuel Henderson and Elizabeth Williams Henderson, and his brother was Thomas Henderson. In 1745, his family moved to Granville County, North Carolina. There, he studied law, was admitted to the bar, practiced law, and in 1768, was appointed judge of the Superior Court.

In 1763, he married Elizabeth Keeling, the daughter of an Englishman. Their children were Fanny (b. 1764), Richard (b. 1766), Archibald (b. 1768), Elizabeth (b. 1770), Leonard (b. 1778), and John (b. 1780).

Viewed as a member of the gentry, he had been a target of Regulator violence. He was a member of a Church of England parish in Williamsboro during this time.

In 1773, Henderson retired from the bench to pursue his real estate interests.

== The Transylvania Company and Colony ==
After a brief career in law, on August 27, 1774, Henderson organized a land speculation company with a number of other prominent North Carolinians. Originally called Richard Henderson and Company, the company name was first changed to the Louisa Company, and finally to the Transylvania Company on January 6, 1775.

=== The Transylvania Purchase ===
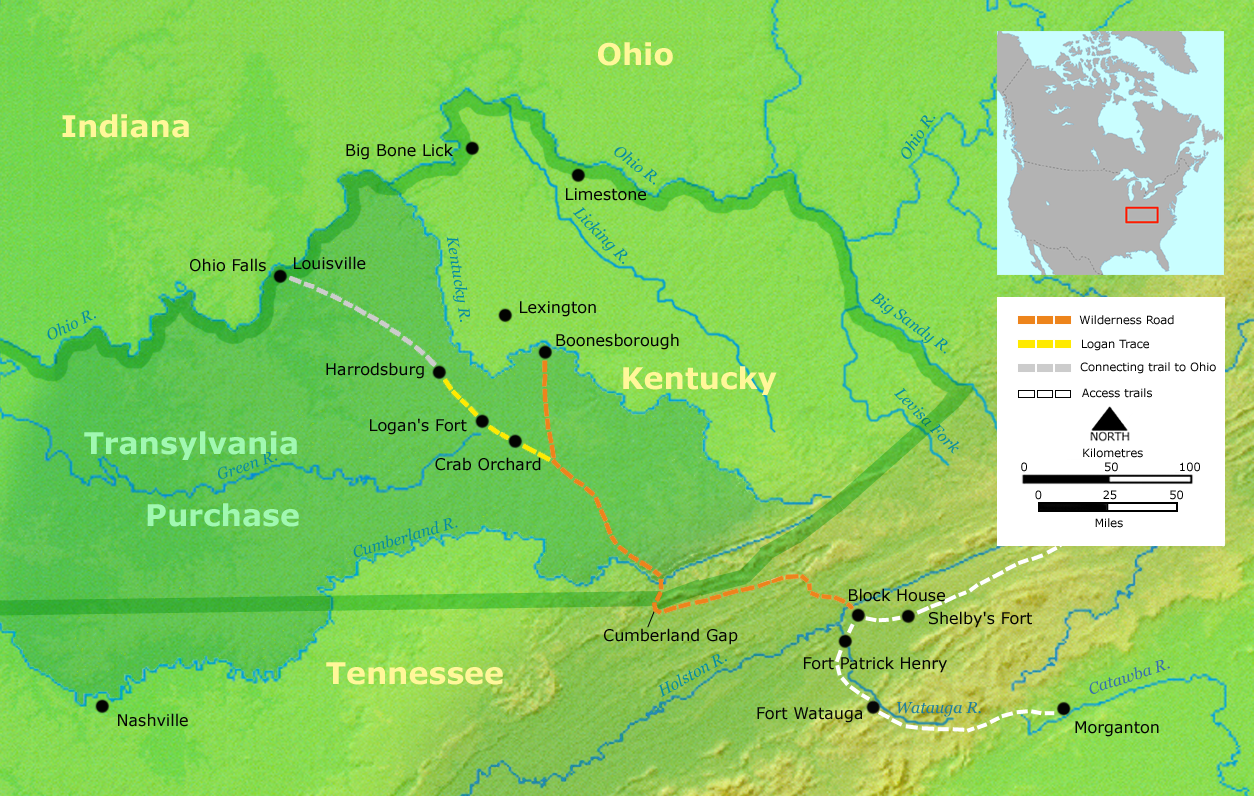
The Transylvania Purchase at Sycamore Shoals in Elizabethton, Tennessee, and The Wilderness Road into Kentucky

In March 1775, Henderson gathered chiefs of the Cherokee Indians and negotiated the Treaty of Watauga at Sycamore Shoals at present day Elizabethton, Tennessee, during which time he purchased all the land lying between the Cumberland River, the Cumberland Mountains, and the Kentucky River, and situated south of the Ohio River.

The land thus delineated encompassed an area half as large as the present state of Kentucky. In order to facilitate settlement, Henderson hired Daniel Boone, who had hunted extensively in Kentucky, to blaze the Wilderness Road through the Cumberland Gap and into the Transylvania land purchase. Henderson also purchased the land known as the Path Grant that allowed access to the Transylvania lands. That purchase is described on the Path Grant Deed.

To appease other prominent early explorers, Henderson held out other rewards. He offered Joseph Martin, founder of Martin's Station on Martin's Creek in present-day Rose Hill, Lee County, Virginia, a spot as an agent and entry taker for the company, in charge of keeping tabs on settlers moving westward; Henderson offered Martin's brother Bryce a tract of 500 acres (2.0 km^{2}) adjacent to the Cumberland Gap.

=== The Transylvania Compact ===
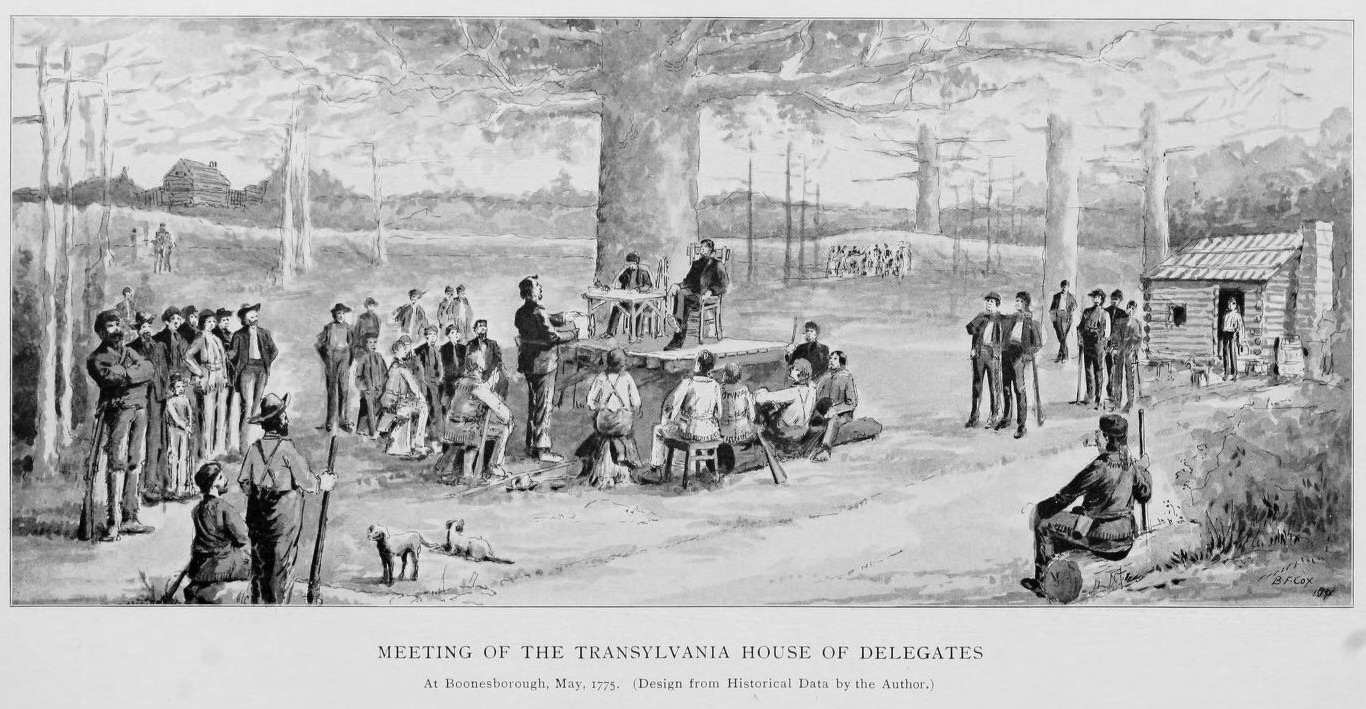
The Transylvania Constitutional Convention, May 23, 1775, at Boonesborough, Anonymous sketch

Henderson followed Boone to a site that came to be called Boonesborough, located on the southern bank of the Kentucky River, Henderson encouraged the few settlers there to hold a constitutional convention.

In May 1775, under the shade of a huge elm tree, a compact organizing a frame of government was drafted. The intended government entailed executive, legislative, and judicial branches. After concluding the Transylvania Compact, Henderson returned to North Carolina and on behalf of his fellow investors in the land scheme petitioned Congress seeking to make Transylvania America's fourteenth colony. Despite those efforts, Congress was unwilling to act without the consent of Virginia and North Carolina, both of whom claimed jurisdiction over the region in question.

In June 1776, the Virginia General Assembly prohibited the Transylvania Land Company from making demands on settlers in the region and, in December 1778, declared the Transylvania claim void. North Carolina invalidated the remaining Tennessee portion of the purchase in 1783. Henderson and his partners instead received a grant of 200,000 acres (81,000 ha) on the Ohio River below the mouth of Green River.

== Later life ==
In 1778, Henderson briefly returned to the bench but resigned a short time later to pursue more land deals. In 1779–80, he led another group of settlers into the Cumberland Valley in Tennessee and founded the settlement Fort Nashborough (present-day Nashville) in the French Lick area.

In 1779, Judge Henderson was appointed one of six commissioners to run the line between Virginia and North Carolina into Powell's valley. He served as a captain (1779–1781) in the Granville County Regiment of the Hillsborough District Brigade in the North Carolina militia in the Revolutionary War.

He represented Granville County, North Carolina, in the House of Commons of the North Carolina General Assembly in 1781. He was elected by the legislators to be one of the Councilors of State in 1782–83.

== Death and legacy ==
Henderson died at the age of 49 on January 30, 1785. He was buried on his farm near Williamsboro, North Carolina, on Nutbush Creek.

One of his sons, Leonard Henderson, was a Chief Justice of the North Carolina Supreme Court (1829–1833). Henderson, North Carolina, was named after him. Richard's other son, Archibald Henderson, was a legislator representing Rowan County, North Carolina.

In Henderson's western Kentucky land grant on the Ohio, in an area named Red Banks, an early settlement became the town of Henderson, his namesake, in 1797. Later, Henderson County, Kentucky, (seat Henderson) also named for him, subsumed the land grant.

Ashland plantation house, Henderson's childhood home in North Carolina, was listed on the National Register of Historic Places in 1973.
