= Wilderness Road =

Historic highway in Kentucky, US

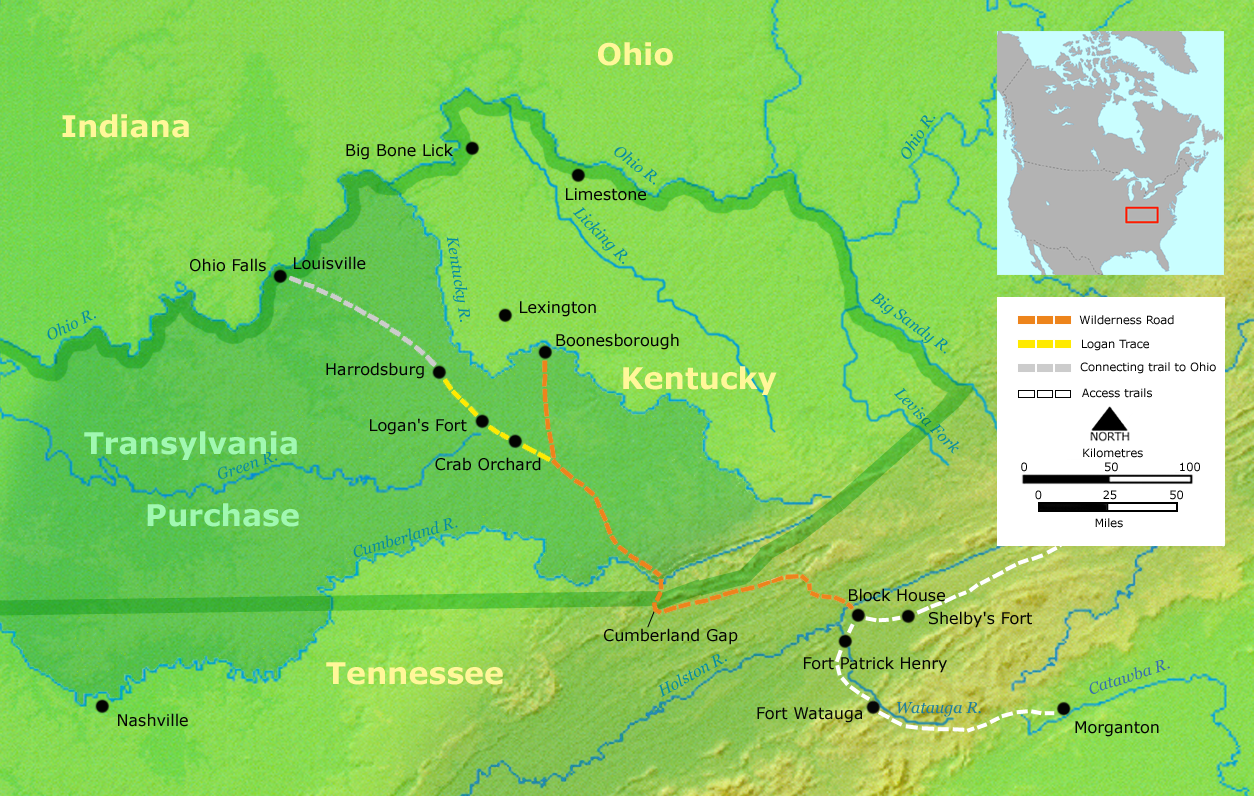
The course of the Wilderness Road by 1785

The Wilderness Road was one of two principal routes used by colonial and early national era settlers to reach Kentucky from the East. Although this road goes through the Cumberland Gap into southern Kentucky and northern Tennessee, the other (more northern route) is sometimes called the "Cumberland Road" because it started in Fort Cumberland in Maryland. Despite Kentucky senator Henry Clay's advocacy of this route early in the 19th century, the northern route was selected for the National Road, connecting near Washington, Pennsylvania, into the Ohio Valley of northern Kentucky and Ohio.

In March 1775, land speculator Judge Richard Henderson established the Transylvania Company and hired frontiersman Daniel Boone to blaze the trail from Fort Chiswell in Virginia through the Cumberland Gap, creating a pathway for westward migration. It was later lengthened, following Indian trails, to reach the Falls of the Ohio at Louisville. The Wilderness Road was steep, rough and narrow. It could be traversed only on foot or horseback. By contrast, wagons could travel along the National Road route (originally the Braddock Road blazed by the competing Ohio Company and George Washington circa 1750), particularly after the improvements.

Despite the adverse conditions, thousands of families used the Wilderness Road. In 1792, the new Kentucky legislature provided money to upgrade the road. In 1796, an improved all-weather road was opened for wagon and carriage travel. The road was abandoned around 1840 (construction on the National Road after Vandalia, Illinois, also stopping owing to the Panic of 1837 and early railroad construction), although modern highways follow much of its route.

== Early exploration ==
The Appalachian Mountains form a natural barrier to east–west travel. From New York to Georgia there are only five ways to travel to the west, with only three natural interior breaks allowing animal powered travel without great engineering works: the Gaps of the Allegheny in Pennsylvania (the Kittanning Paths), the Cumberland Narrows in northwestern Maryland (host to Nemacolin's Path), and the Cumberland Gap in the four-state region of North Carolina and Virginia on the east side and through the gap, Tennessee and Kentucky.

While late 19th and 20th-century technologies would later bridge the mountain chain in other places, these all required significant civil engineering works to make a road bed past the barrier range geologist classify as the ridge-and-valley Appalachians. Settlers from Pennsylvania tended to migrate south along the Great Wagon Road through the Great Appalachian Valley and Shenandoah Valley.

The first European explorers of the southern Appalachian Mountains were Spanish. Hernando de Soto and his troops traversed the region in 1540 and 1541 searching for gold.

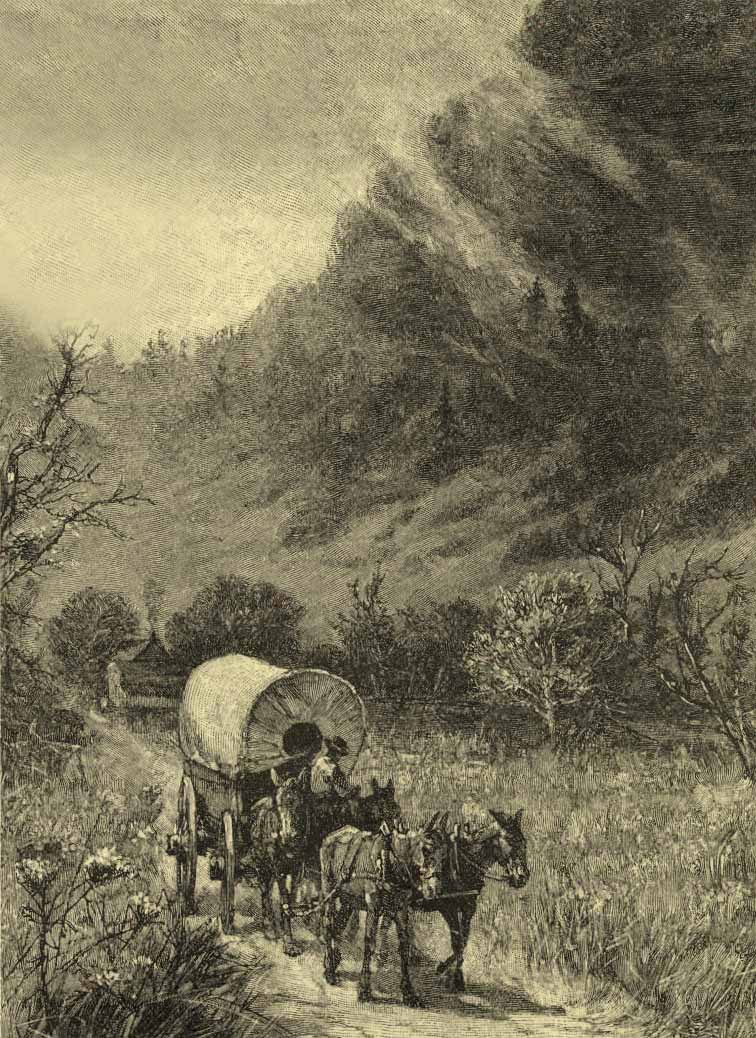
Wilderness Road

The first recorded English explorations of the mountains were those of Abraham Wood, which began around 1650. Later, Wood sent exploring parties into the mountains. The Batts-Fallam expedition reached the New River Valley in 1671. In 1673, Wood sent Gabriel Arthur and James Needham to the Overhill Cherokee of modern Tennessee. The purpose was to try to make direct contact with the Cherokee for trade, so as to circumvent the Ocaneechee "middlemen" traders.

The expedition reached the Overhill Cherokee area, but Needham was killed on the return trip. Gabriel Arthur was almost killed, but was rescued and adopted by a Cherokee chief. For his own safety, Arthur was then sent with one of the chief's raiding parties. For about a year, he traveled with the Cherokee throughout the Appalachians. He was probably the first European to visit modern West Virginia.

In 1750, Dr. Thomas Walker, an investor in the Loyal Land Company, with five companions, made a famous exploration through the Cumberland Gap and into eastern Kentucky. The Loyal Land Company settled people in southwest Virginia, but not Kentucky.

In 1769, Virginia longhunter and explorer Joseph Martin made the first of several forays into the region. Acting as an agent for Dr. Thomas Walker, to whom Martin was connected through family relationships, Martin began an expedition to Powell's Valley in early 1769 in return for a promised 21,000-acre (8,500 ha) land grant from Walker and the Loyal Land Company. Martin and his men built the earliest westernmost frontier fort at present-day Rose Hill, Virginia, a fort dubbed Martin's Station. Later that year Indians chased off Martin and his men, who returned to Albemarle County. Martin returned six years later to rebuild the fort, and a few months later became an agent for Richard Henderson's Transylvania Company, a land speculation enterprise.

Henderson, a North Carolina judge, organized the Transylvania Company in 1774 with a number of other prominent North Carolinians. The men hoped to purchase land from the Cherokees on the Kentucky side of the Appalachian Mountains and establish a British proprietary colony. Henderson hired Daniel Boone, an experienced hunter who had explored Kentucky, to blaze a trail through the Cumberland Gap into central Kentucky.

== Daniel Boone ==
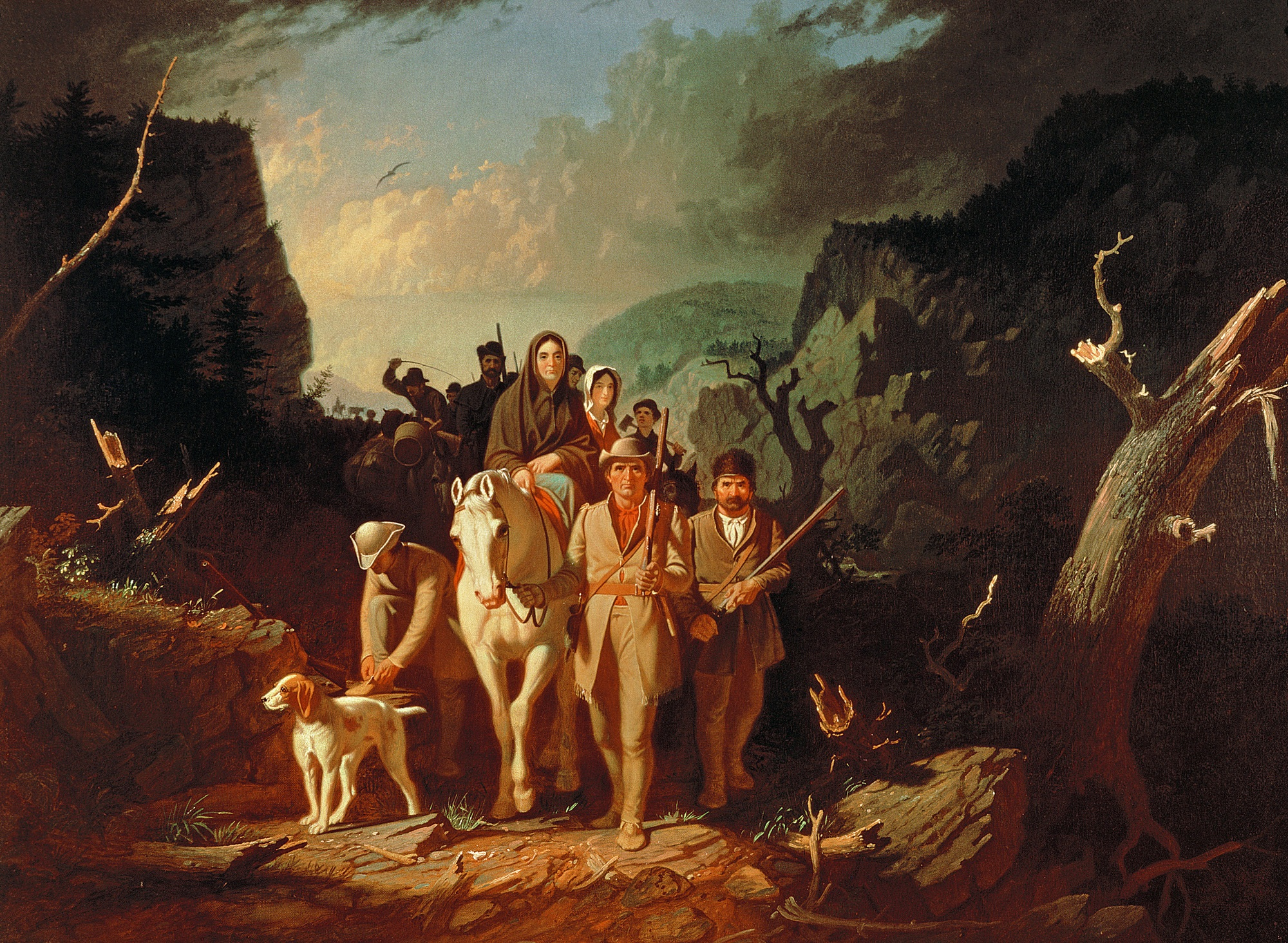
George Caleb Bingham, Daniel Boone Escorting Settlers through the Cumberland Gap (1851–2, Mildred Lane Kemper Art Museum)

Starting on March 10, 1775, Boone, along with 35 axmen, cut a trail from Long Island in Kingsport, Tennessee through the forests and mountains to Kentucky. It was a rough mud trail, hardly more than a path. The Transylvania Company had obtained title to Kentucky from the Cherokee and Iroquois, and even the Shawnee chief Cornstalk, defeated in Dunmore's War, had promised at the Treaty of Camp Charlotte on October 19, 1774, that his tribe would no longer hunt or claim land south of the Ohio River in Kentucky.

Daniel Boone was from Pennsylvania and had migrated south with his family along this road. From an early age, Boone was one of the longhunters who hunted and trapped among the Native American nations along the western frontiers of Virginia, so-called because of the long time they spent away from home on hunts in the wilderness. Boone would sometimes be gone for months and even years before returning home from his hunting expeditions.

Boone recommended three essentials for a pioneer: "A good gun, a good horse, and a good wife." He also would need a strong body, a sharp ax and good luck. Another essential was salt. Before 1776, it had to be shipped into the Thirteen Colonies from the West Indies at great expense. It was the only meat preservative available for men on the move and Kentucky had an extra lure with its large salt brine lakes near what is today the community of Boonesborough, Kentucky. The many "salt licks" of Kentucky are today reflected in the many place names in the state that use the words "lick" or "licking".

The Shawnee viewed Boone and other settlers as invaders. On March 24, 1775, Boone and his party were only 15 miles (24 km) from their final destination of the Kentucky River when they camped for the night. Just before daybreak a group of Shawnee, slinging tomahawks, attacked the sleeping men. Some of Boone's party were killed and a few were wounded but most were able to escape into the woods. Boone regrouped his men and managed to drive off the hostile Shawnee. The party lost some of their horses. Here Boone built a temporary open barricade with 6 to 7-foot (2.1 m) high logs.

By the next year, the Shawnee had been joined by the Chickamauga Cherokee in the Cherokee–American wars with the settlers, which lasted until 1794.

== Route ==
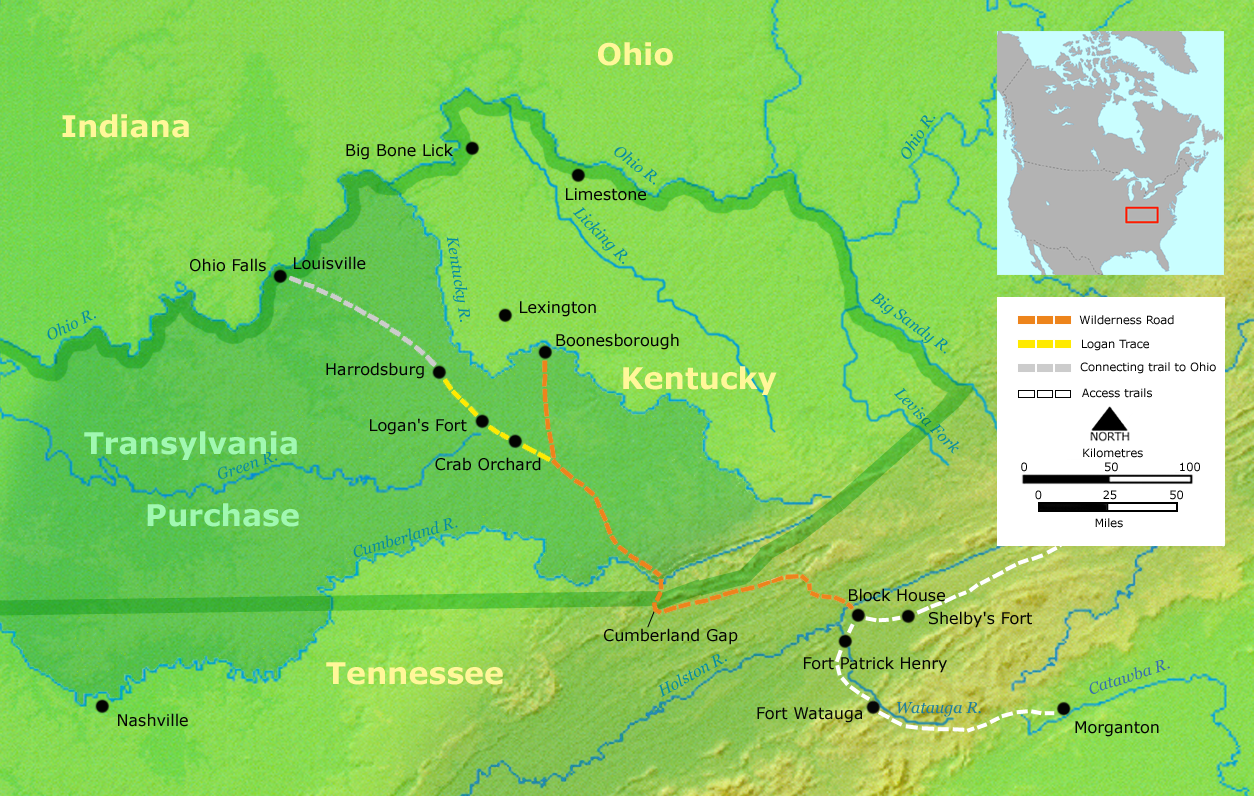
The Logan Trace (in yellow) and the Wilderness Road

The Wilderness Road made a long loop from Virginia southward to Tennessee and then northward to Kentucky, a distance of 200 miles (320 km).

From the Long Island of the Holston River (modern Kingsport, Tennessee), the road went north through Moccasin Gap of Clinch Mountain, then crossed the Clinch River and crossed rough land (called the Devils Raceway) to the North Fork Clinch River. Then it crossed Powell Mountain at Kanes Gap. From there it ran southwest through the valley of the Powell River to the Cumberland Gap.

After passing over the Cumberland Gap the Wilderness Road forked. The southern fork passed over the Cumberland Plateau to Nashville, Tennessee via the Cumberland River. The northern fork split into two parts. The eastern spur went into the Bluegrass region of Kentucky to Boonesborough on the Kentucky River (near Lexington). The western spur ran to the Falls of the Ohio (Louisville). As settlements grew southward, the road stretched all the way to Knoxville, Tennessee, by 1792.

=== Western spur ===
The first map of Kentucky, presented in 1784 by author John Filson to the United States Congress

Due to road realignments in many places modern roads do not always follow the old wilderness trails.

==== Skaggs Trace ====
The western spur of the Wilderness road was originally known as Skaggs' Trace, named after the longhunter Henry Skaggs. The trace began just outside Hazel Patch, in present-day Laurel County, and continued to Crab Orchard.

==== Logan's Trace ====
In 1775, Benjamin Logan's party, that included John Floyd, split with Daniel Boone's party and turned westward on Skaggs Trace. The trail went through the Crab Orchard approximately 10 miles where a Blockhouse was built to protect settlers in the area and named Logan's Fort. From there the trail went to the area that became Danville (1783) originally named Crow's Station in 1774, what would become Springfield (1793), Harrodsburg referred to as Harrod's Town or Oldtown and founded by James Harrod on June 16, 1774, abandoned and resettled in 1775, Bardstown (settled in 1780), Shepherdsville (founded as Bullitt's Lick in 1773), and the Falls of the Ohio.

Robert Emmett McDowell (1914–1975), Kentucky historian and Filson Historical Society member since 1956, claims there are errors in Filson's map. The map shows the trail leaving Louisville through Sullivan's Old Station, Kuvkendahl's Mill, the Fishpools to Bullitt's Lick, then through Bardstown to Danville. McDowell claims that originally the trail went through Harrodsburg not Danville, and Sullivan's Old Station and Kuykendahl's Mill were not on the main road but high water alternate paths. Further claims were made that the Wilderness Trail was improved after General George Rogers Clark landed at the Falls of the Ohio which would facilitate the movement of troops and supplies as well as settlers.

In 1784, Filson, also an historian, wrote The Discovery, Settlement and present State of Kentucke and an Essay towards the Topography, and Natural History of that important Country. Reuben Thomas Durrett indicates there are inaccuracies as well.

== Dangers ==
Because of the threat of Native American attacks, the road was so dangerous that most pioneers traveled well armed. Robbers and criminals also could be found on the road, ready to pounce on weaker pioneers. Although the Transylvania Company had purchased the region from the Cherokee, and the Iroquois had ceded it at the Treaty of Fort Stanwix, other tribes, such as the Shawnee, still claimed it and lived there.

Often entire communities and church congregations would move together over the road to new settlements. Hundreds of pioneers were killed by Indian attacks.

Defensive log blockhouses built alongside the road had portholes in the walls for firing at Native American attackers. They were often called "stations". No one knew exactly when the next attack would happen. The Shawnee came from the north, while the Chickamauga (Cherokees who rejected the land sale treaty) came from the south. The tribes were resentful of the settlers taking their ancestral hunting lands, and the French and Indian War had further stirred up their passions against the white man.

There was a great variety of animal life in the wilderness. At night, the pioneers could hear the hoots and screeches of owls, the howls of wolves, and the cries of panthers and wild cats. Sometimes the Native Americans imitated these sounds. Venomous snakes such as copperheads and rattlesnakes blended into the leaves and undergrowth and were a danger to the pioneers, their horses and cattle.

== Settlement ==
Judge Richard Henderson had made a treaty with the Cherokee at Sycamore Shoals in 1775, purchasing over 20,000,000 acres (8,100,000 ha) of land between the Cumberland and Kentucky Rivers. On March 28, 1775, he left Long Island (Kingsport, Tennessee) with about 30 horsemen on the grueling trip down the Wilderness Road to Kentucky. At Martin's Station 40 to 50 additional pioneers joined the venture. On their way, they met nearly a hundred refugees fleeing Native American attacks further down the road.

Despite the danger, the party kept going toward Kentucky. Since some of the streams were flooded, the pioneers had to swim with their horses. On April 20, they arrived at Boonesborough, a fortified town, named by Judge Henderson in honor of Boone.

After 1770, a surge of over 400,000 Scots-Irish immigrants arrived in the colonies to escape the poor harvest, high rents and religious intolerance of Ulster. Since the better lands had already been taken, they constantly pressed onward to the western frontier of the foothills of the Carolinas.

The flood of Scots-Irish, German, and others immigrants kept coming. Over 200,000 pioneers came over the Wilderness Road, enduring severe hardships. In the winter of 1778–79, the weather was so cold that the Kentucky River froze to a depth of two feet. The frontier settlements alongside the road struggled to survive. Many of the cattle and hogs froze to death. The settlers had to eat frozen cattle and horses to survive.

Often the Chickamauga, under the leadership of Dragging Canoe, would hide in ambush for weeks between Cumberland Gap and Crab Orchard, a distance of 100 miles (160 km). They would not attack large groups but wait for weaker ones who were not able to defend themselves. More than 100 men, women and children were killed in the fall of 1784 along the Wilderness Road. Many families, even in ice and snow, crossed the creeks and rivers without shoes or stockings; they often had no money and few clothes. They lived off the land by hunting in the woods and by fishing in the streams.

Since they had hardly any money, entire families sometimes walked hundreds of miles after landing in America. They even used cattle as pack animals to carry their heavy loads. Cabins were built and land was cleared of trees and undergrowth so crops could be planted.

Chestnut was the most popular wood since its logs could be used to build cabins and rail fences to protect crops from wild animals. It could easily be split into shingles for roofs to cover cabins and barns. Its bark was used to make medicine and tannic acid for tanning and dyeing. In the fall, its rich nuts were used to fatten razorback hogs for the market and the home. Hemlock was also highly valued for its many uses.

== Commerce and mail ==
The Wilderness Road served as a great path of commerce for the early settlers in Kentucky, as well as for wagon-loads of slaves being transported through Tennessee to plantations in Mississippi and Louisiana. Horses, cattle, sheep and hogs herded in the other direction found waiting markets in the Carolinas, Maryland and Virginia. Hogs in groups of 500 or more were driven down the Road to market. Beef in Eastern markets had become a main source of income for farmers in Kentucky.

A postal road was opened in 1792 from Bean Station, Tennessee through Cumberland Gap to Danville, Kentucky. This was due largely to the efforts of Governor Isaac Shelby of Kentucky. This connection of Kentucky to the East was a great advantage. Frontier settlers considered the postal riders heroes and waited eagerly for their arrival for news from settlements along the trails as well as getting their mail and newspapers.

== Civil War and decline ==
Use of the Wilderness Road fell when the National Road was opened in 1818, allowing travel to the Ohio River on more level ground from the East. The Panic of 1837, geology and new railroad technology doomed the James River Canal, once envisioned as augmenting this commercial route. At the same time, the steamboat first appeared on the Ohio and Mississippi Rivers, allowing faster and cheaper travel both up and down the rivers. During the 1850s, the Virginia and Tennessee Railroad was constructed along part of this route.

During the American Civil War, both the Union Army and the Confederate States Army used the Wilderness Road. An early battle (Camp Wildcat), stymied the first Confederate attempt to seize control of neutral Kentucky. The Cumberland Gap changed hands four times throughout the war. Southern troops used the road for marches into Virginia. General Ulysses S. Grant came down the road for the Union campaign in Tennessee in 1864. Grant was so taken by the Road that he said, "With two brigades of the Army of the Cumberland I could hold that pass against the army which Napoleon led to Moscow."

== Preservation ==
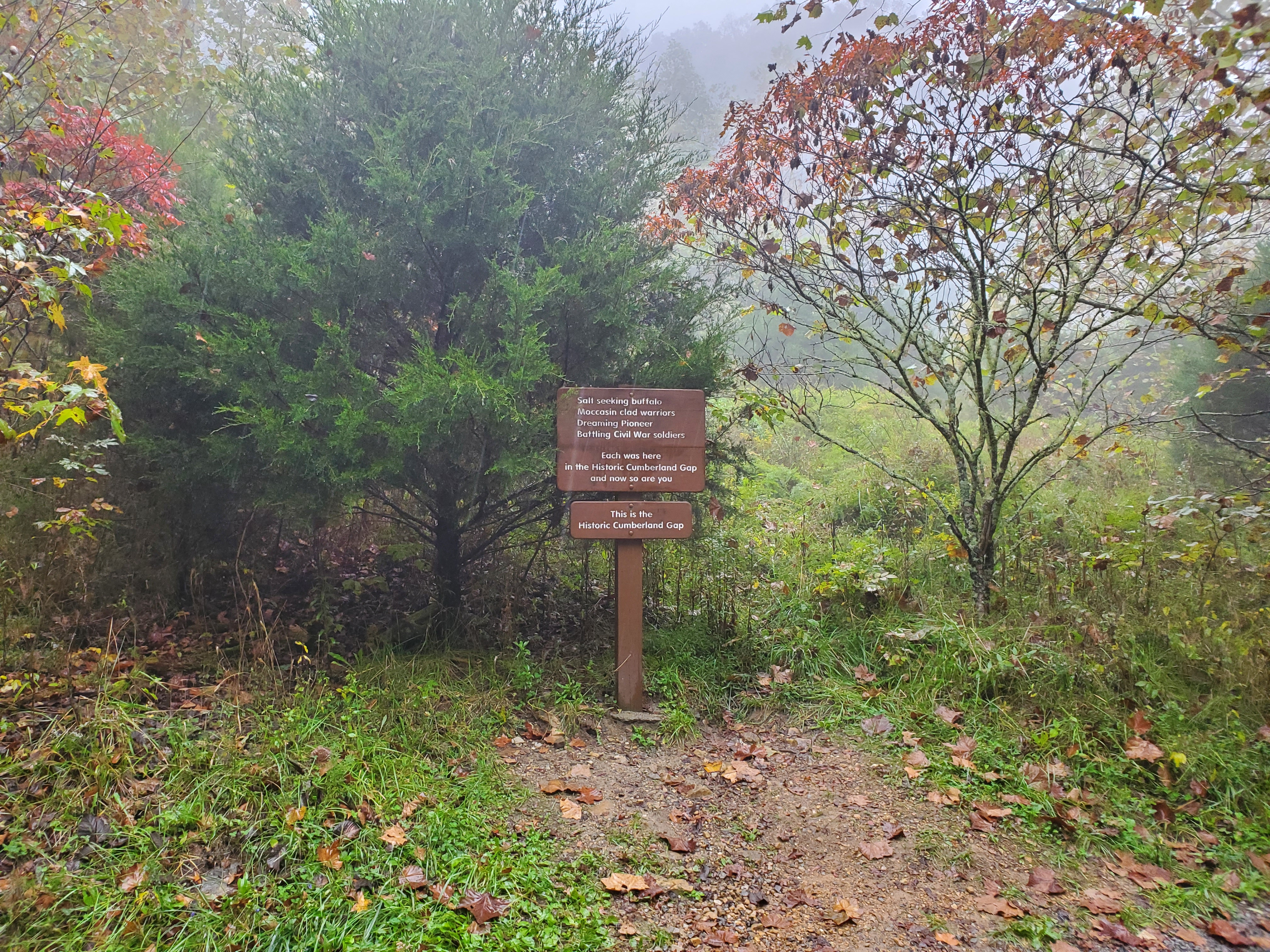
Cumberland Gap height of land along the Wilderness Road

A segment of the Wilderness Road was among the first roads in the United States to be paved. The old road from the town of Cumberland Gap, Tennessee to Middlesboro, Kentucky through the mountain pass was paved and completed on October 3, 1908. This was an "object-lesson" road (a new kind of paved macadam construction funded by local communities but with federal governmental supervision) initiated by the U.S. Office of Public Roads. At that time, only about 680 miles (1,090 km) of paved roads existed in the United States. Its name was later changed to U.S. Route 25E. This new road brought a new industry, tourism, to the rural areas filling hotels and restaurants with travelers.

Cumberland Gap is a National Historical Park, and portions of the Wilderness Road can be visited at Wilderness Road State Park in Virginia. Additionally, a reconstructed fort at Martin's Station in Virginia on the Wilderness Road can be visited about 5 miles (8 km) east of the Cumberland Gap. Since the completion of the Cumberland Gap Tunnel in 1996, a project has been underway to restore the original appearance of the Wilderness Road as it crosses the historic Cumberland Gap.

Since 2001, Hwy. 25E has been obliterated over several miles of its length and the original grade restored, including the addition of 32 feet (9.8 m) of elevation to restore the Gap to its original contour, with virtually all modern artifacts, buildings and roads removed. The replanting of thousands of seedlings from original forest stocks in the area is intended, over a period of decades, to recreate a forest that will allow visitors to view the crossing of the Gap on the Wilderness Road as travelers would have experienced it circa 1790. This section of the Wilderness Road is now a hiking trail, including an interpretive center about the road's history located on the Tennessee side.

== See also ==
- Kentucky County, Virginia
- Ohio Country
- Overmountain Men
- Southwest Territory
- Trans-Appalachia
