= Joseph Martin (general) =

American politician

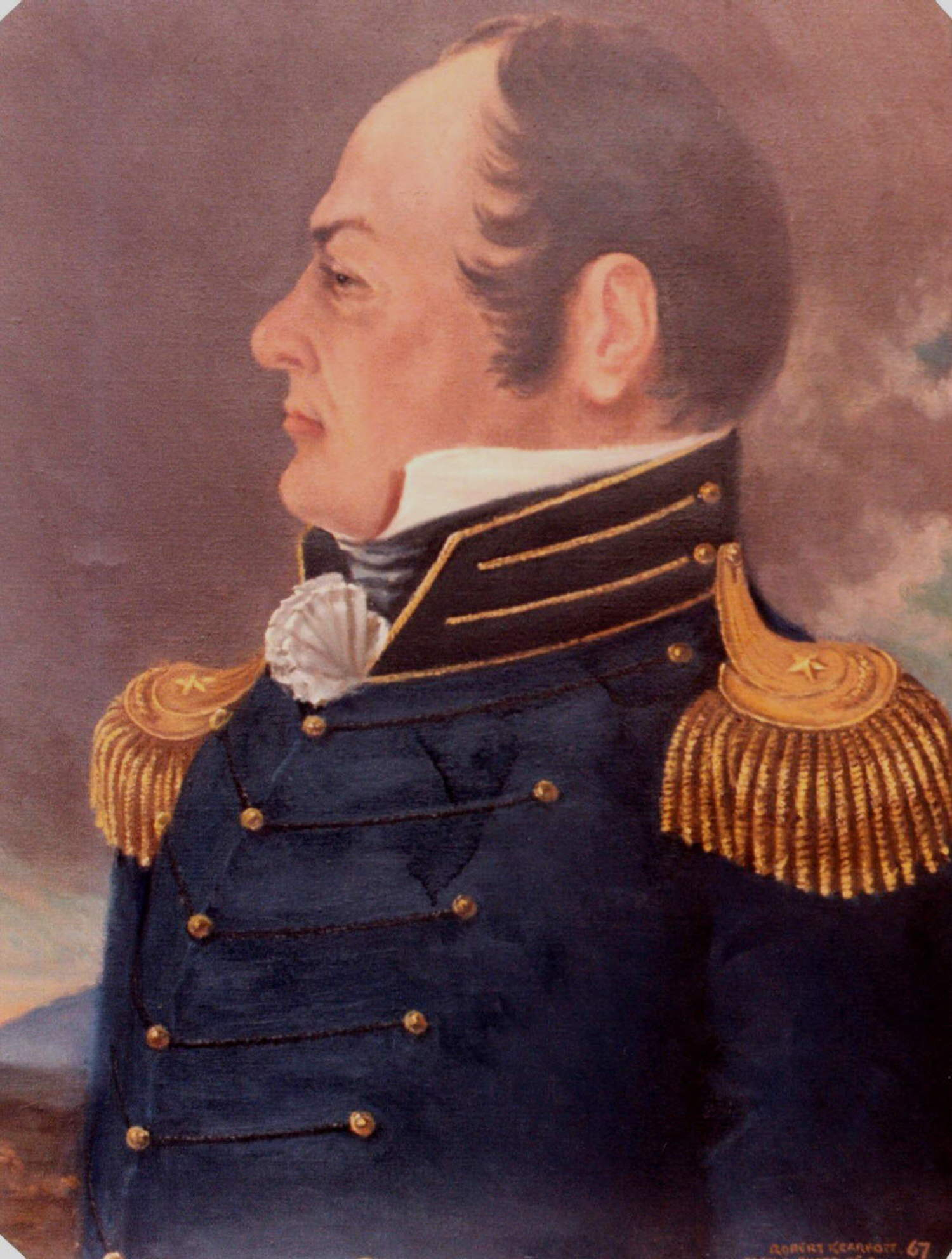
Modern imagining of Brigadier General, Joseph Martin Jr. (1740–1808), born Caroline County, Virginia, died Henry County, Virginia.

Joseph Martin, Jr. (1740–1808) was a brigadier general in the Virginia militia during the American Revolutionary War, in which Martin's frontier diplomacy with the Cherokee people is credited with not only averting Indian attacks on the Scotch-Irish American and English American settlers who helped win the battles of Kings Mountain and Cowpens, but with also helping to keep the Cherokee's position neutral and from siding with the British troops during those crucial battles. Historians agree that the settlers' success at these two battles signaled the turning of the tide of the Revolutionary War—in favor of the Americans.

Martin was born in Caroline County, Virginia, and later lived at Albemarle County and then at Henry County, Virginia, at his plantation, Belmont, on Leatherwood Creek in Martinsville, not far from the plantation of his friend Governor Patrick Henry, Leatherwood Plantation.

Martin held many positions during his public life. As a very young man he first tried his hand at farming, next he worked for three years as an overseer on the huge plantation of his local Virginia kin, next he was a longhunter, and an explorer on the frontier for friend Patrick Henry, then an early pioneer and builder of Martin's Station in the "wild west," a surveyor of the Kentucky/North Carolina and Tennessee/Virginia borders, an agent and fighter dealing with Native Americans for Patrick Henry, a member at peace treaties with the Native Americans, and along with Thomas Walker, Joseph Martin named the Cumberland region and the Cumberland River, he served as a member of the legislatures of Virginia, Georgia, and North Carolina, he was lifelong friends with Thomas Sumter, he was also friends and brothers-in-law with Benjamin Cleveland (both married Graves sisters), he was unsuccessfully nominated by Patrick Henry to the position of the first governor of the Southwest Territory, was the holder of some 80,000 acres across the Southeastern U.S. at one point. The city of Martinsville, Virginia, was named in his honor during his lifetime.

== Early life ==
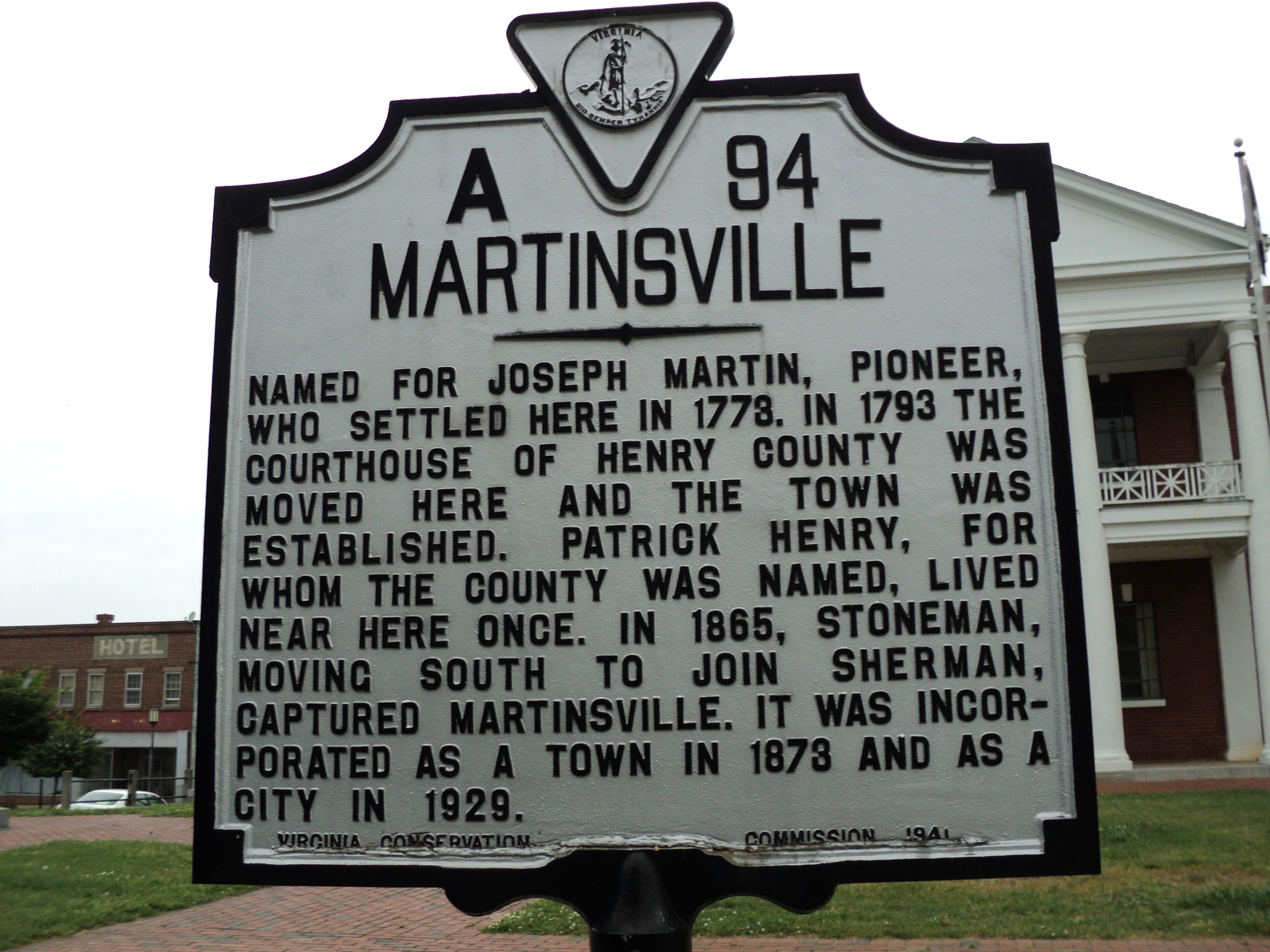
Historic marker for Martinsville, Virginia, named for Joseph Martin

The son of planter Capt. Joseph Martin Sr. and his wife Susannah Chiles, great-granddaughter of Colonel John Page, Joseph Martin Jr. was raised in a Virginia gentry family in Caroline and Albemarle Counties. His father, Joseph Martin Sr., was the son of wealthy British merchant William Martin in Bristol, England, (Note: The Martin family of Virginia claims descent from the Martins of Withy Bush House, Prendergast, Pembrokeshire, Wales.) who sent his son to Virginia as supercargo aboard his ship the Brice. (Note: The family name was pronounced MAR-TEEN in England, but the family's origins are likely Cambro-Norman.) Martin Sr. wrote to his English father that he planned to marry the daughter of a common Virginia colonist. Even though she was from the Chiles family and was a descendant of Virginia's Col. John Page, to Martin's wealthy father back in England all American colonists were inferior to the English. William Martin of Bristol was himself Lord Mayor of Bristol and owner of a ship building company, a glass manufacturing plant, importer and exporter with the new world; including tobacco. The father wrote back disinheriting young Joseph Martin Sr., who never returned to England.

Joseph Martin Sr. was "a perfect Englishman", recalled his grandson later, "large and athletic; bold, daring, self-willed and supercilious. And in him was depicted, as my father has told me, the most complete form of the aristocracy of the British government." Capt. Martin arrived in Albemarle County in 1745, one of the original patentees. Joseph Martin Sr. left some 300 acres of his landholdings to son Joseph Jr. at his death in 1762. Nearby neighbors Dr. Thomas Walker, Peter Jefferson, James Madison, and the Lewis and Clark clans and kin including Lewis, Carr, Waller, Dabney, Hammock, Hughes, etc.

But Joseph Martin Jr., the grandson of the English immigrant, was not cut out for a Virginia gentry planter's life. "Gambling was a favorite pastime." Martin's son, Revolutionary War officer Col. William Martin, in his accounts of his father's life in the, "Lyman Draper Manuscript Collection," writes that although his father gambled, he was not much of a drinker and let his son in on his secret; Martin sometimes pretended to over-drink so he might appear to be drunk in order that fellow gamblers would let down their guard. As a youth, Joseph Martin ran off from an apprenticeship during the French and Indian War of 1756, and joined the army at Fort Pitt, where he served alongside another Virginia youth, Thomas Sumter. Following his early army service, Martin lit out for the rigors of the frontier, where he dressed in buckskin and was an early real estate speculator, trapper and fur trader and Indian fighter. (Note: Although Joseph Martin inherited from his father over 300 acres of land as well as a half-interest in a plantation on a tributary of the Potomac River that Joseph Martin Sr. held jointly with Col. Francis Warner of Essex County, the son elected to dress in buckskin and spend his time inland on the frontier.) But this time on the frontier was after Martin had bought a large plot of land in Henry County with his earnings working for three years as an overseer for an uncle. Martin also gained 20,000 acres of land from Patrick Henry in a surveying contest at Powell Valley. Martin's youthful adventures on the frontier were grist for later stories... some of which were written by Martin's political foes and were slanted to paint a picture of him in an unkind light. One writer, a fan of Martin's political enemy, called him lazy and refused to describe him by his military ranking. General Joseph Martin may have been many things in his lifetime, but a quick study of his history and his accomplishments show that he was far from lazy. Eventually the soldiering, trapping and Indian fighting transformed the young Martin into a fearsome explorer.

Among Martin's earliest excursions on the frontier was one made on behalf of family friend Dr. Thomas Walker. Martin's son, Revolutionary War officer Col. William Martin, describes the naming of the area and the river in a letter to historian Lyman Draper, "A treaty with the Cherokees was held at Fort Chiswell, Virginia on New River, then a frontier. On the return of the chiefs home, Dr.[Thomas] Walker, a gentleman of distinction, and my father, [General] Joseph Martin, accompanied them. The Indians being guides, they passed through the place now called Cumberland Gap, where they discovered a fine spring. They still had a little rum remaining, and they drank to the health of the Duke of Cumberland. This gave rise to the name of Cumberland Mountain and Cumberland River."

In 1769, Martin journeyed to Powell's Valley to attempt a settlement, a full 100 miles (160 km) ahead of any previous settlement. Martin and his party – which included his brother Brice and Mordecai Horde (Note: Born in Caroline County, Virginia, Mordecai Hord was also an early settler of Henry County, where he settled on his plantation named Hordsville. Hord owned 'vast tracts of land' in Powell's Valley, which he explored along with Joseph Martin. The two shared many of the same friends, including Patrick Henry, an executor of Hord's will along with Hord's brother-in-law Col. George Waller, married to Henry's first cousin Ann Winston (Carr) Waller.) – had hoped to secure the 21,000 acres (85 km^{2}) granted to Dr. Walker and themselves. Martin's Creek in the region where Joseph Martin attempted his settlement is today named for him. (Martin's Station, as the settlement was known, became a well-known stopover for westward-bound settlers for many years.) The settlement ultimately failed, which some historians have blamed on the inability of the Loyal Company to defend its title to the tract. (Note: Other historians have attributed the failure of the early settlement to the resistance of the Cherokee tribe to this earliest incursion.)

But in the foray to Powell's Valley, Martin had established his credentials as a hard-bitten explorer. Daniel Boone and his party of explorers were stunned in 1769 when, upon their arrival in Powell's Valley, they discovered that Martin and his 20-man party had beaten them there. It was beyond the farthest reaches that Boone and his long hunters had explored. Following Martin's feat, the Albemarle County native became a force to be reckoned with in exploration circles, even though Martin's settlement was soon broken up by the Cherokees, who pushed back against the westernmost settlement yet attempted.

By 1775, when North Carolina merchant Richard Henderson purchased an immense tract of land from the Cherokees to found the short-lived Transylvania colony, in what is today Kentucky, Henderson turned to Martin as his agent in Powell's Valley. (Note: In exchange for acting as agent for the Transylvania colony, Martin was granted by founder Henderson preferential rights to Martin's land claim in Powell Valley.) It was one of several such roles that the explorer, accustomed to trapping, longhunting and traveling in the Appalachian wilderness inhabited by the Cherokee, would hold over the years. (Note: An experienced longhunter and Indian trader, Martin continued to traffic in skins as late as 1781, when two Native Americans attempting to deliver skins to Martin at his Long Island settlement were slain by colonists.)

== Martin's Station ==
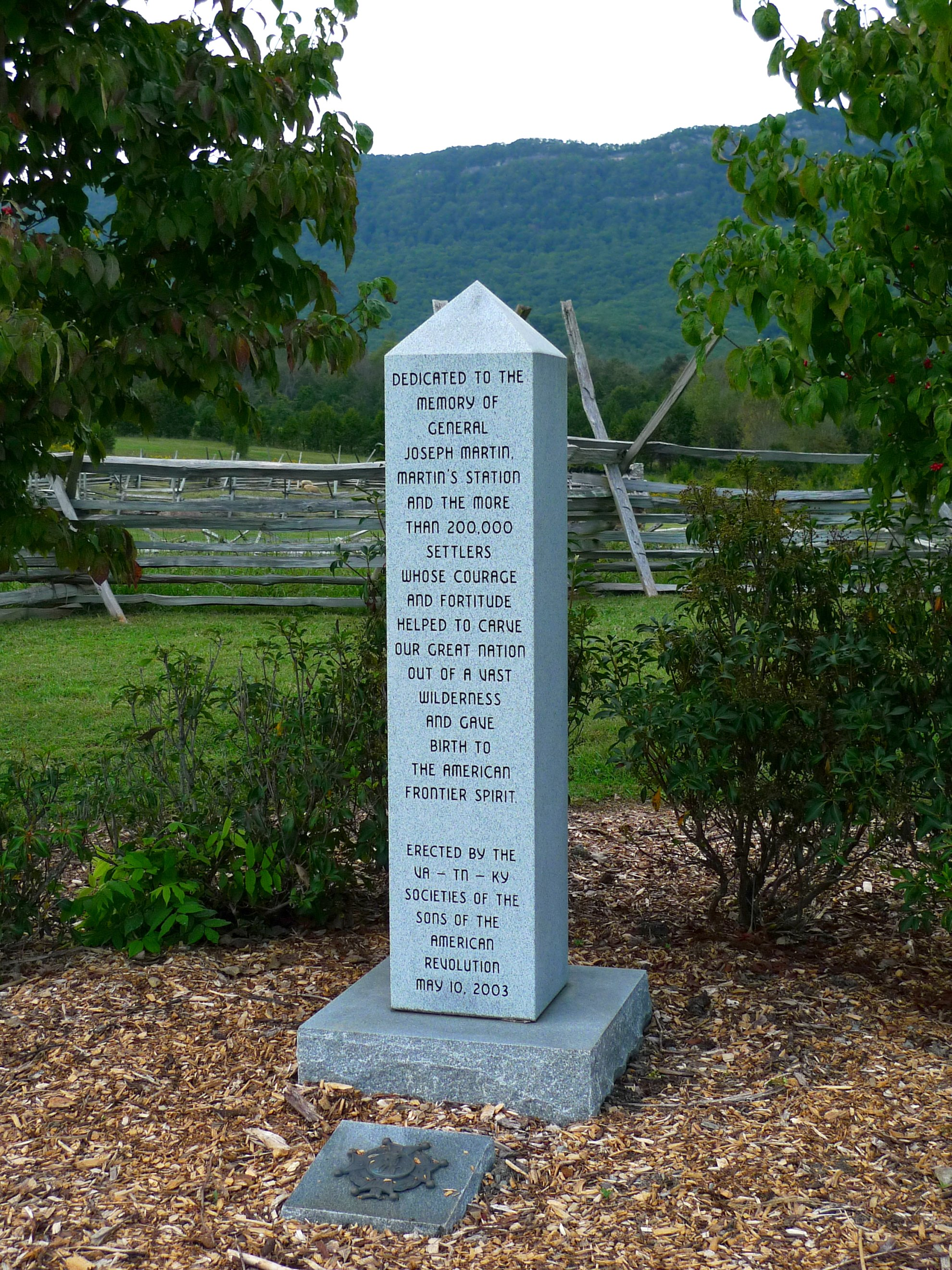
General Joseph Martin, Jr. (1740–1808), born Caroline County, Virginia, died Henry County, Virginia. Memorial to General Joseph Martin and settlers at Martin's Station, Virginia.

Martin's Station stood along the Wilderness Trail near Rose Hill, Virginia. Martin arrived in Powell Valley in 1769, having been offered a grant by Dr. Thomas Walker of 21,000 acres. Martin constructed "improvements" upon the land, that being a few cabins and a corn planting, but Martin's party was attacked by the local Native Americans. He returned a few years later in 1775 and built a new "Martin's station". Again he was attacked by the Indians and had to leave. Moving closer to the Cumberland Gap, he built another new "Martin's Station", his third, in 1783. The small fort provided protection plus supplies for hunters and immigrant families moving into Kentucky. He was able to finally sell his fort and lands in Powell County, Kentucky in 1788, and moved back to the town in Henry County, Virginia, that would soon be renamed in his honor: Martinsville.

A "fourth" Martin's Station was recently constructed at the Wilderness Road State Park. "Builders of the hand-hewn log replica, constructed in 2002, used only the kinds of tools that Martin would have used in the wild frontier in the later 1700s. Workers carted logs into the construction site with oxen and then used ropes and horses to set those logs in place. At times, reenactors came on the scene and made the construction yet more authentic by staging spontaneous Indian attacks."

== Life along the frontier ==
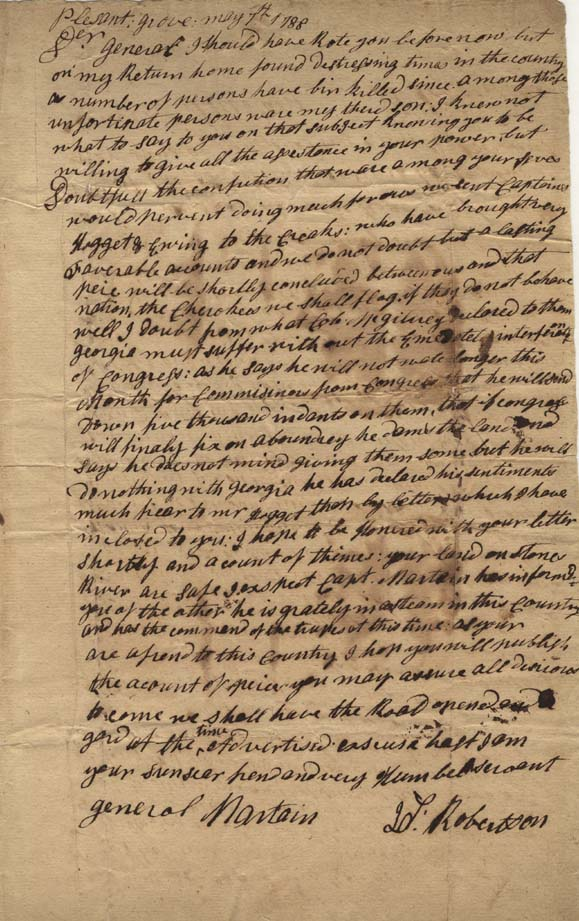
Letter from James Robertson, founder of Nashville, Tennessee, to Joseph Martin, Jr., 1788

"Martin was a robust figure in the history of the early frontier," according to the WPA guide to the Old Dominion. "He was born in Albemarle County in 1740, ran away to fight Indians at 17, became an Indian agent, land agent, and officer of militia, fighting Indians all up and down the frontier. In 1774 he came to Henry County, established himself at Belle Monte on Leatherwood Creek, for nine years sat for his district in the general assembly, and in 1793 was made a brigadier general of state militia. He was a brawny, picturesque man, more than six feet tall and the father of 18 children; wore buckled knee breeches and a great beard, braided and thrust inside his shirt."

Martin first married Sarah Lucas in Orange County, Virginia. After her death in Henry County, Martin married Susannah Graves, a descendant of Captain Thomas Graves. Susannah Graves, of Spotsylvania County, Virginia, the wife of Joseph Martin, and her second cousin Mary Graves, who was married to Benjamin Cleveland, Susannah Graves was the daughter of William Graves and Mary unk, Mary was the daughter of Joseph Graves and Sarah Bunyard. Both are direct descendants of Thomas Graves and Anna Davenport, common ancestor, is Capt. Thomas Graves. [Ref; Wills of Joseph Graves and Thomas Graves]. While married to Sarah Lucas and then to Susannah Graves, Martin was simultaneously married to his half-Cherokee wife, Elizabeth Ward, the daughter of Nancy Ward, a power within the Cherokee tribes, and her husband, English trapper Bryan Ward. The polygamous relationship, justified by Martin as common practice among frontiersmen operating among the tribes, caused considerable consternation to General Martin's son, Col. William Martin. (Note: But despite his misgivings over his father's polygamous relationship, Col. William Martin was still moved to say that Betsy's Ward's mother Nancy Ward was "one of the most superior women I ever saw.") Joseph Martin and Betsy Ward had two children. (Joseph Martin's son by his Cherokee wife was educated in Virginia schools, but afterwards elected to return to the Cherokee.)

On November 3, 1777, Martin was commissioned by Governor Patrick Henry as Agent and Superintendent for Indian Affairs for the State of Virginia. (Martin served in the same capacity with the state of North Carolina from 1783 to 1789.) Gov. Henry instructed Martin that he was "to reside at some place in that Nation in order to negotiate and direct all things relating to the Commonwealth and which concern the interest thereof, using your best endeavors from time to time to preserve peace with that Nation and to cultivate their present good Disposition." It was an appointment Martin would continue to hold until 1789.

During his time on the frontier, Martin became acquainted at an early age with two other Revolutionary War patriots and frontiersmen: Benjamin Cleveland, who was his brother-in-law, [They were not related, just lifetime friends. Susannah Graves, the wife of Joseph Martin and Mary Graves the wife of Benjamin Cleveland were second cousins, common ancestor Capt. Thomas Graves. <\ref> Wills of Joseph Graves, Thomas Graves and Benjamin Graves. Grace S. Green] Cleveland having married the sister of Susannah Graves; and Thomas Sumter, who had been a companion of Martin's during his early adventures on the frontier. Both men were fellow Virginia natives who struck out for the wilds, and both were ardent patriots.

During the Revolutionary War it was the efforts of Joseph Martin (then a Major) that helped prevent the Overhill Cherokee from launching widespread attacks on American colonists, which Loyalist agents had attempted to incite. Following the British capture of Savannah and Augusta, Georgia in 1778–1779, English goods made their way to the Cherokee on the Savannah River, prompting some tribesmen to rejoin the English cause.

Martin's diplomacy with the Cherokees in 1780–81, wrote the American Historical Association, enabled the Continental Army to achieve victory over the English at the Battle of Kings Mountain, thus hastening the end of the conflict. On the eve of the Battle of Guilford Court House, in February 1781, General Nathanael Greene wrote Martin and seven other officers – including John Sevier, Arthur Campbell, and William Christian – appointing them agents to treat with the Cherokees and Chickasaws "to afford the Said Tribes of Indians every mark of our good disposition towards them." Foremost in Greene's thinking, apparently, was keeping the Indians on the sidelines as the Continental Army and its militia forces fought the British in the last days of the war. Greene was probably mindful of previous British attempts at sending large quantities of ammunition, weapons, horses, cash and goods to their Indian allies through their Florida redoubts.

At the same time – and complicating Martin's legacy – Martin and his sons were prime movers behind the settlement of Tennessee by removing obdurate Cherokees from the territory.

By the end of the Revolution, Martin's place as chief colonial Indian agent seemed secure. In January 1780, Virginia governor Thomas Jefferson directed Martin to negotiate with the Cherokees to secure land around a new fort being overseen by General George Rogers Clark at the mouth of the Ohio River (Fort Jefferson). In the fall of 1783, the State of Virginia built a new fort at the Cumberland Gap, replacing an older fort which was adjudged to lie within the boundaries of North Carolina. The new Virginia fort was designed as the primary residence for Martin while he was in the region on official business. And in 1784, Thomas Jefferson directed Martin to use his connections with the Cherokees to negotiate for more land between the Carolinas and the Mississippi to establish American sovereignty over the region.

Later, in a twist overlooked by most historians, Martin corresponded with Alexander McGillivray, the leader of the Creek Indians, who had Loyalist sentiments. In 1788 a letter from Martin to McGillivray was intercepted in which Martin professed to be interested in settling abroad. When the letter was discovered, the North Carolina General Assembly launched an investigation into Martin's conduct. But he was later exonerated when it turned out that he was acting as a spy on Patrick Henry's instructions to ferret out the nature of McGillivray's ties to the Spanish, who were then active in Florida.

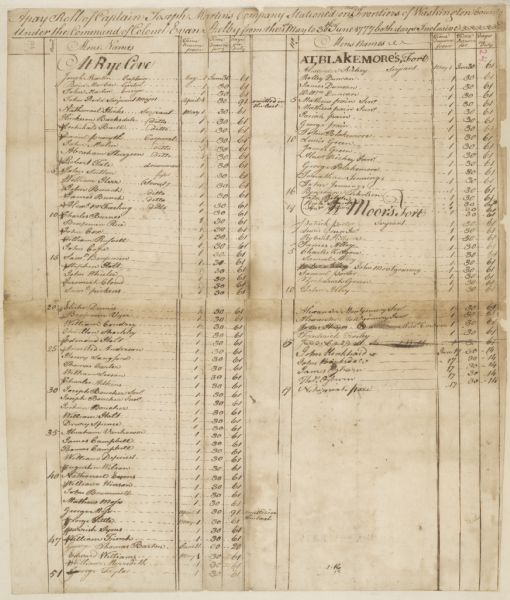
Payroll of Continental Army forces in Washington County, Virginia, handwritten by Capt. Joseph Martin Jr., 1777

"General Martin's conduct so far as I could discern in that affair was really praise-worthy," Henry wrote to United States Senator from Virginia Richard Henry Lee. "He [Martin] frequently gave me Intelligence of Creek Indian affairs, and of the intercourse between other Indians and the Spaniards that was interesting.

General Martin and Governor Patrick Henry kept a long-running correspondence through the years, some of which concerned real estate speculation. Other letters recounted Martin's dealings with the Indian tribes, as well as settlement efforts in Tennessee. As late as 1790, Patrick Henry wrote Joseph Martin concerning a real estate investment, holding out that the hope, Henry noted, that Martin might finally capitalize on his long service to Virginia. "After all the Hazards you have run," Henry wrote, "that you have not acquired so much property as many others would have done in your situation, I was desirous to throw something in your way by which some fine lands would have been offered to you in our purchase."

== Career as an Indian agent ==
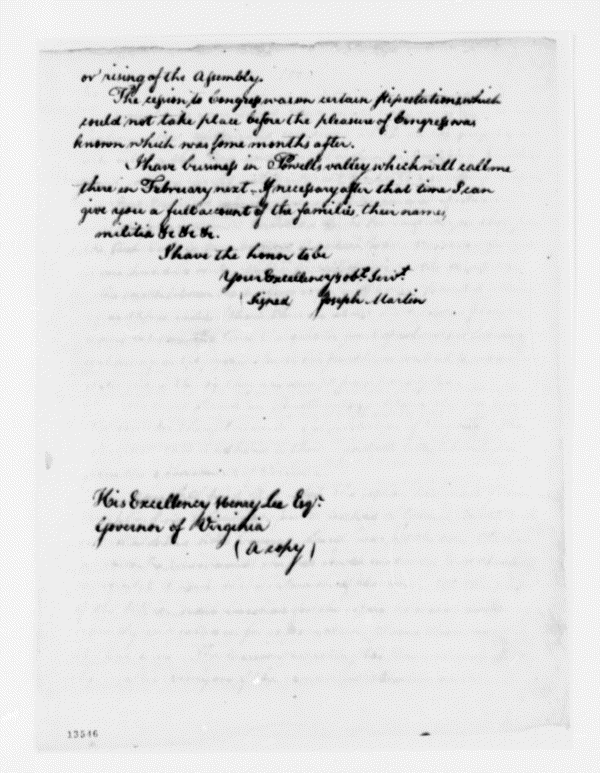
Letter from Joseph Martin, Jr. to Virginia Governor Henry Lee discussing Powell Valley, ca 1791

Ultimately, General Martin lost his appointment as chief Indian agent. Martin's "manner of treating with the Indians necessarily prevented his appointment," Senator Richard Henry Lee informed Patrick Henry in September 1789. "At present no such office as a standing Indian agent is appointed. The Government of the Western Territory is charged with such affairs."

In some quarters Martin was seen as too lenient with the Indians, especially after an incident in 1786 (Note: The previous year, in April 1785, Patrick Henry first warned Joseph Martin that the encroachment of settlers of the secessionist State of Franklin, by usurping Cherokee lands without payment, was upsetting arrangements previously reached between the state of Virginia and the tribe.) when several young Cherokee warriors were said to have murdered two white settlers near Clinch Mountain. The killings set off calls for retribution within the secessionist State of Franklin, and Martin found himself trying to mediate the dispute, and calm the settlers, while trying to prevent the angry Cherokees from joining with the Creeks. (Note: Early in the creation of the State of Franklin, Joseph Martin had been elected by the Franklin Council to serve on the new colony's Privy Council, but Martin wrote Henry that he had rejected the post, thinking that it would conflict with his duties as a Virginia agent to the Indians.) Martin did little to disguise his contempt for the authorities of the State of Franklin, who, Martin wrote Henry, "immediately marched into the above mentioned Town, where they killed one Young [Indian] woman, and Shot Several others."

But Martin himself had not hesitated to wield military power against the Cherokees, especially when they killed several colonists at the instigation of Loyalist and English agents during the Revolution. In 1781, following a running battle between Indian forces and those of the colonists, Colonel Arthur Campbell, (Note: Campbell County, Tennessee was named for Virginia legislator Arthur Campbell.) Lieutenant Colonel John Sevier and Martin addressed a letter to the Indian chiefs, warning them about their actions. "You know you began the war," the bulletin began, "by listening to the bad councils of the King of England and the falsehoods told you by his agents." Further hostilities, the three colonial leaders warned, would result in a military campaign against the Indian villages. Seven years later, in 1788, Martin again fought the Overmountain Cherokee, as well as the Chickamauga Cherokee, in a battle at Lookout Mountain, during the Cherokee–American wars.

But having eventually struck a hard-won peace with the tribes, Martin bridled at the actions of the State of Franklin. Henry empathized with Martin, writing the General in May 1785 that "the disorderly behavior of the Franklin people, as they call themselves, gives me concern. If they will not be subservient to the Rules and Regulations respecting Indian affairs, which prevail in all the States, they must expect none of the advantages of the Union." (Note: Henry, Martin and others saw the conduct of the State of Franklin settlers, who urged secession from the new union, as endangering much of what had been accomplished on the frontier. They also saw it in economic terms as driving a wedge between the newly created states and perhaps encouraging encroachment by the always-feared Spanish interests, especially on the Mississippi and in the western territories. As large land speculators, this fear was probably uppermost in the minds of many Virginia gentry.)

"Partisans of the State in N[orth] Carolina afterwards found him obnoxious to their views," former Governor Henry wrote Virginia Senator William Grayson in urging Martin's reappointment in 1789, "and as I believe often endangered his Life For his duty called him to discourage their Disorderly conduct [and] thwart their favorite Schemes." Henry then commended Martin for his efforts to impose restraints upon the actions of the State of Franklin settlers, whose "frequent Butcherys of Indians & Refinement in cruelty sufficiently characterize these people who are Mr Martins decided Foes."

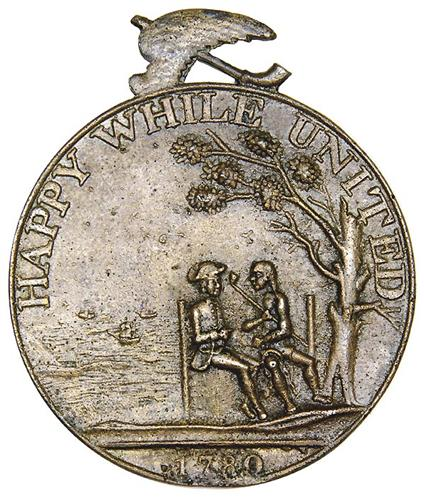
Happy While United, bronze medals struck by State of Virginia in 1780, carried by Martin for distribution to Cherokee allies of Virginia colonists fighting British rule

Martin's attempts to restrain the State of Franklin settlers from a more-belligerent course made Martin unacceptable in some quarters, where he was seen as too 'soft' on the tribesmen. Martin also became controversial in some quarters after the Treaty of Hopewell in 1785, when Martin, Andrew Pickens and Benjamin Hawkins, acting as government agents, concluded treaties with the Cherokees and the Choctaws. The Cherokee treaty particularly engendered later enmity from the Indian signatories, as well as the colonial state governments. The Indians saw the treaty as a thinly veiled land grab, and the state governments saw the treaty as an attempt to encroach on local government authority, and attempts were made in Congress to void it. "No action of Martin's life brought down on him more condemnation than this [the Hopewell Treaty]," wrote historian Stephen B. Weeks of the incident.

Consequently, his appointment as agent was not renewed, despite Henry's repeated entreaties to political allies for Martin's reinstatement. (In a 1789 letter to Senator William Grayson, Henry reminded his political ally that Martin had been so effective in his Indian dealings during the Revolutionary War that British agents had offered rewards to their Indian allies for Martin's scalp.)

But the forces allied against Martin overwhelmed Henry's defense, and in 1789, his career as Indian agent finished, General Martin sold his large holdings in the Powell's Valley and near Cumberland Gap and returned to his lands in Henry County next door to Henry's (Note: "His wife and Family are my neighbours at Leatherwood & I can forward any letter to him," former Governor Henry wrote to United States Senator from Virginia William Grayson in 1789.) to spend the rest of his life. A year later, in 1790, when the governorship of the Southwest Territory opened up, Patrick Henry suggested Gen. Martin, along with George Mason, for the job, but both were passed over in favor of William Blount.

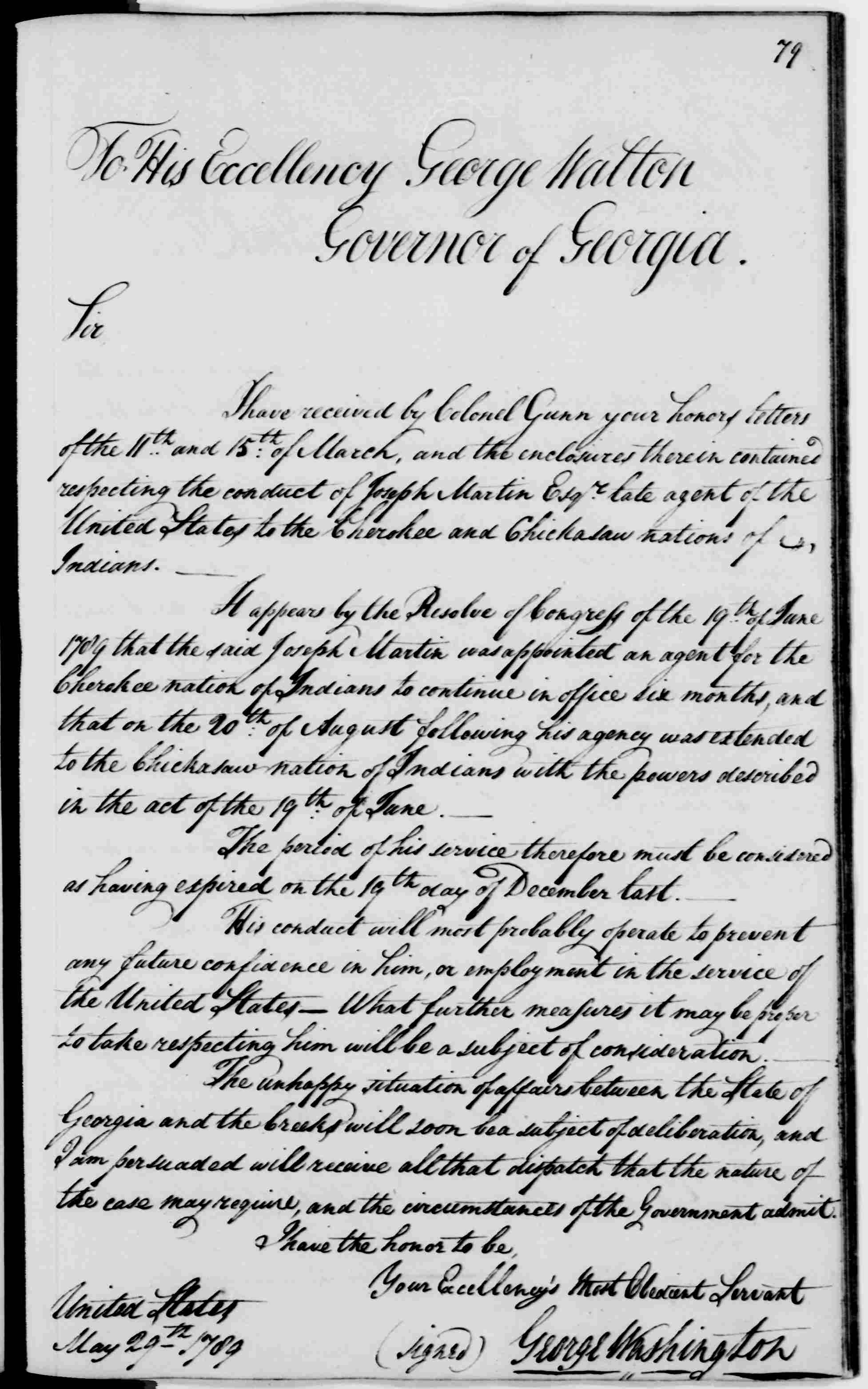
Letter from George Washington to Georgia Governor George Walton expressing Washington's disapproval of Martin's performance as agent for the Cherokee, 1789

Later Judgments on Martin's career as an Indian agent have been mixed. Writing in 1894, Theodore Roosevelt called Martin "a firm friend of the red race, [who] had earnestly striven to secure justice for them."

== Legislative service ==
In his peripatetic life on the frontier, Martin was called upon to serve in the legislatures of several states. He served as a member of the North Carolina Convention called to approve the United States Constitution, and served several times in the North Carolina General Assembly. Martin was subsequently elected to the Virginia House of Delegates, until he finally chose to retire because of advanced age. (In 1787 the North Carolina assembly chose Martin as Brigadier General of the Washington District.) During his time in the Virginia legislature, Martin was one of the primary supporters of James Madison's Kentucky and Virginia Resolutions. During his military service in Georgia, Martin was elected to the Georgia legislature in 1783.

Martin was also initially a member of the Watauga Association, which supported the founding of the State of Franklin. Martin subsequently resigned his membership when he saw that it might compromise his role as Indian agent.

In 1799, Martin and his old friend Major John Redd of Henry County served as the two county representatives on the Virginia commission relating to the Alien and Sedition Acts.

== Family life, legacy, and descendants ==
Gen. Joseph Martin, Jr.'s first wife was Sarah Lucas. They were both born in Virginia and together had seven children, including Revolutionary War officer, Col. William L. Martin, who eventually moved to Smith County, in Middle Tennessee.

After Sarah Lucas Martin's death, Joseph Martin, Jr. married Susannah Graves in Henry County, Virginia. They had 11 children, all of whom were born in Virginia, including: Col. Joseph Martin of Henry County, Va. He was one of five of Gen. Martin's sons who served in the War of 1812.

Another Martin son, and veteran of the War of 1812, was Patrick Henry Martin. He was a young, trained lawyer, and died a bachelor on his trip home after the war. He was named in honor of Gen. Martin's friend and neighbor, Governor Patrick Henry. Gen. Martin's son, Capt. Lewis Graves Martin, also a veteran of the War of 1812, moved from Henry County, Virginia to Rutherford/Cannon County in Middle Tennessee, in 1816, where he married Belinda Rucker (daughter of Gideon Rucker, Sr. & Joyce Reade; both of whom were born in Va. and moved to Middle Tennessee). They had a large family before Belinda's death in the late 1830s. Capt. Lewis G. Martin remarried and removed to Missouri in 1840. Another Martin son, and veteran of the War of 1812, was Thomas Martin. He also moved to Middle Tennessee where he married Georgia Carr (daughter of Dabney Carr). Alexander Martin, another son and veteran of the War of 1812, also moved to Middle Tennessee. He married Elizabeth Carr (daughter of John Fyndall Carr, also a Tennessean from Virginia), and after some years, moved to Missouri. Another son of Gen. Martin and Susannah Graves was Esq. Judge John C. Martin, who also moved to Middle Tennessee in the days following the War of 1812, where he became a judge and chairman of the Cannon County courts, and served five terms as county executive. He was also responsible for the construction of the original Cannon County court house, erected in 1830. He married Sophia Rucker, sister to his brother Lewis' wife, Belinda.

Other children of Gen. Martin include: George Martin (1763 - 1799), Martha Martin Cleveland, Elizabeth Martin Waller (1768 - 1805), Brice Martin (1770 - 1856), Jesse Martin (1786 - 1836), and Susan Martin King (1799 - 1867).

Gen. Martin also had two children with his half-Cherokee, common law wife ("frontier wife"), Elizabeth Ward, daughter of frontiersman Bryant Ward and his wife Nancy, "the beloved woman of the Cherokee." One of their children may have been Nancy Martin Hildebrand (1778 - 1837).

The Native Indian connection of two members of the Martin family has created some confusion for some Martin genealogy researchers; Gen. Joseph Martin's brother, Capt. John "Jack" Calvin Martin, Sr., of his N.C. Rock House Plantation, a.k.a. Rock Castle Plantation, is often confused with his brother Gen. Joseph Martin. Capt. John "Jack" Martin, Sr. moved from Virginia to N.C. with his brother William Martin, Sr.. In N.C. Capt. John "Jack" Martin, Sr. married a Miss Emory, who was half Native American. She died early in their marriage. Her widower, "Jack," then married her sister, a second Miss Emory. This same Capt. John "Jack" Martin, Sr. and his Emory wife were the parents of a John Calvin Martin, Jr. who served as a judge on the supreme court of the Cherokee Nation in Oklahoma, although he was only 1/4 Cherokee. This Oklahoma judge was the older cousin of the Tennessee judge of the same name; the son of Gen. Joseph Martin and wife Susannah Graves, as mentioned earlier; Esq. Judge, John C. Martin of Tennessee. There were two Martin cousins with the same name who both served as judges. Although they were born many miles and many years apart, their identities are sometimes confused by modern researchers looking at the names alone.

Another brother of Gen. Joseph Martin, William Martin, Sr., was the father of Gen. William "Buck" Martin, Jr., who served in the War of 1812 on Andrew Jackson's staff.

Gen. Martin, after helping adjudicate the western boundary line between North Carolina, Kentucky, and Virginia as far as the Cumberland Mountains, retired to his plantation Belmont on Leatherwood Creek, which he had purchased in 1796 from Benjamin Harrison V of Berkeley Plantation, which was originally built by a Capt. John Martin who was possibly the great-uncle of General Joseph Martin. General Joseph Martin died at his plantation on December 18, 1808, and was buried there in the family cemetery. Buried in the family graveyard are three other Joseph Martins: Colonel Joseph Martin, son of the general, his son Joseph, and his grandson Joseph, who lived at Greenwood plantation.

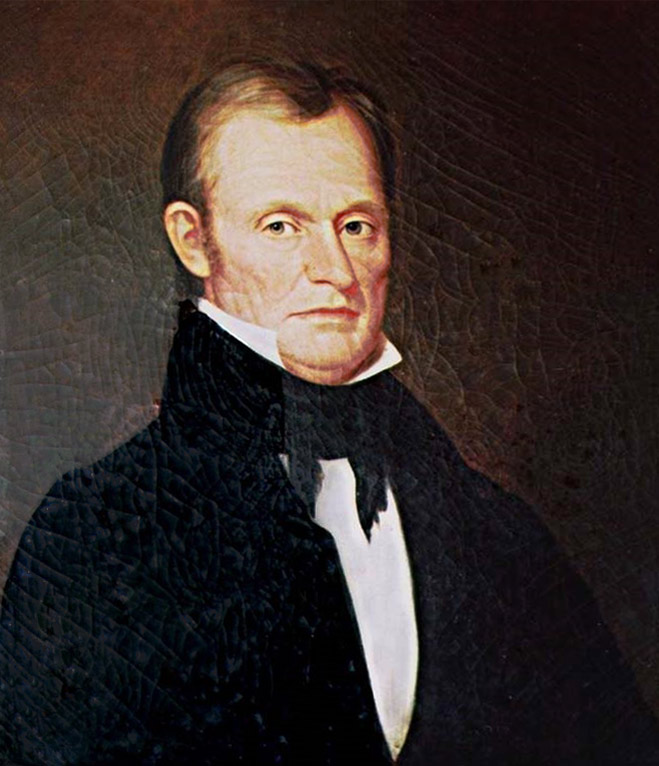
Col. William Martin, son of General Joseph Martin

Initially known as Henry Courthouse, the town of Martinsville, Virginia, was later renamed in honor of this early soldier, planter, pioneer, and real estate speculator. For many years afterwards, General Martin remained an obscure figure, until Lyman Draper began collecting reminiscences about him, including those of Major John Redd, a prominent Henry County planter who served under Martin, and who also wrote about his early recollections of General Nathanael Greene, George Rogers Clark, Daniel Boone, Col. Benjamin Cleveland, Dr. John Walker, and other early prominent Virginia figures.

Martin's descendants include his second eldest son Col. William Martin, Tennessee pioneer, and member of the South Carolina and Georgia legislatures; son Col. Joseph Martin, member of the Virginia House of Delegates, the Virginia State Senate and the Virginia Constitutional Convention 1829–1830; daughter Martha Martin, who was the 1st wife of William Cleveland, son of John (Preacher John) Cleveland, Jr., brother of Benjamin Cleveland, hero of the Battle of King's Mountain; William Cleveland was a nephew of Benjamin Cleveland; son Major Brice Martin, Tennessee pioneer and surveyor in 1801 of the disputed boundary between Virginia and Tennessee;. Other descendants: Dr. Jesse Martin Shackelford, founder of Martinsville's Shackelford Hospital, later Martinsville Memorial; Judge Nicholas H. Hairston of Roanoke.; United States Senator from Virginia Thomas Staples Martin from Charlottesville, Virginia.; Judge John Dillard of the North Carolina Supreme Court; American theologian and Biblical Greek scholar Archibald Thomas Robertson.; Alabama Governors Joshua L. Martin, Gabriel Moore, John A. Winston, and Charles Henderson; as well as Alfred M. Scales, Confederate General in the Civil War, and subsequently Governor of North Carolina. Also descended from Martin was Henry Smith Pritchett, an educator born in Missouri who served as president of the Massachusetts Institute of Technology.

== Toby's freedom ==
General Joseph Martin, Jr. owned a slave named 'Toby' from the time Toby was about 25 years old, and in his letters to historian Lyman Draper, Martin's son Col. William Martin told Draper that Toby, "a bright mulatto, a little under middle stature, of great physical powers, as well as mental" had served his father for many years and had distinguished himself in several battles. It was General Martin's intention, noted his son, that Toby be freed at Joseph Martin's death, but the General died intestate. Taking note of the General's affection for his longtime servant, as well as the Martin's family members' sentiments toward Martin's constant companion, the family elected "by mutual consent" to leave Toby out of the inventory of General Martin's estate, and Toby "has ever since been free, and has made himself a good estate." In his letter to Draper, Col. William Martin calls the freed slave "my fine old brother Toby."

== Recent monument ==
On June 27–29, 2008, 200 descendants of General Joseph Martin gathered in the city named for him to unveil a monument in his honor, at the Gen. Joseph Martin, Jr. Bicentennial Celebration.

== See also ==
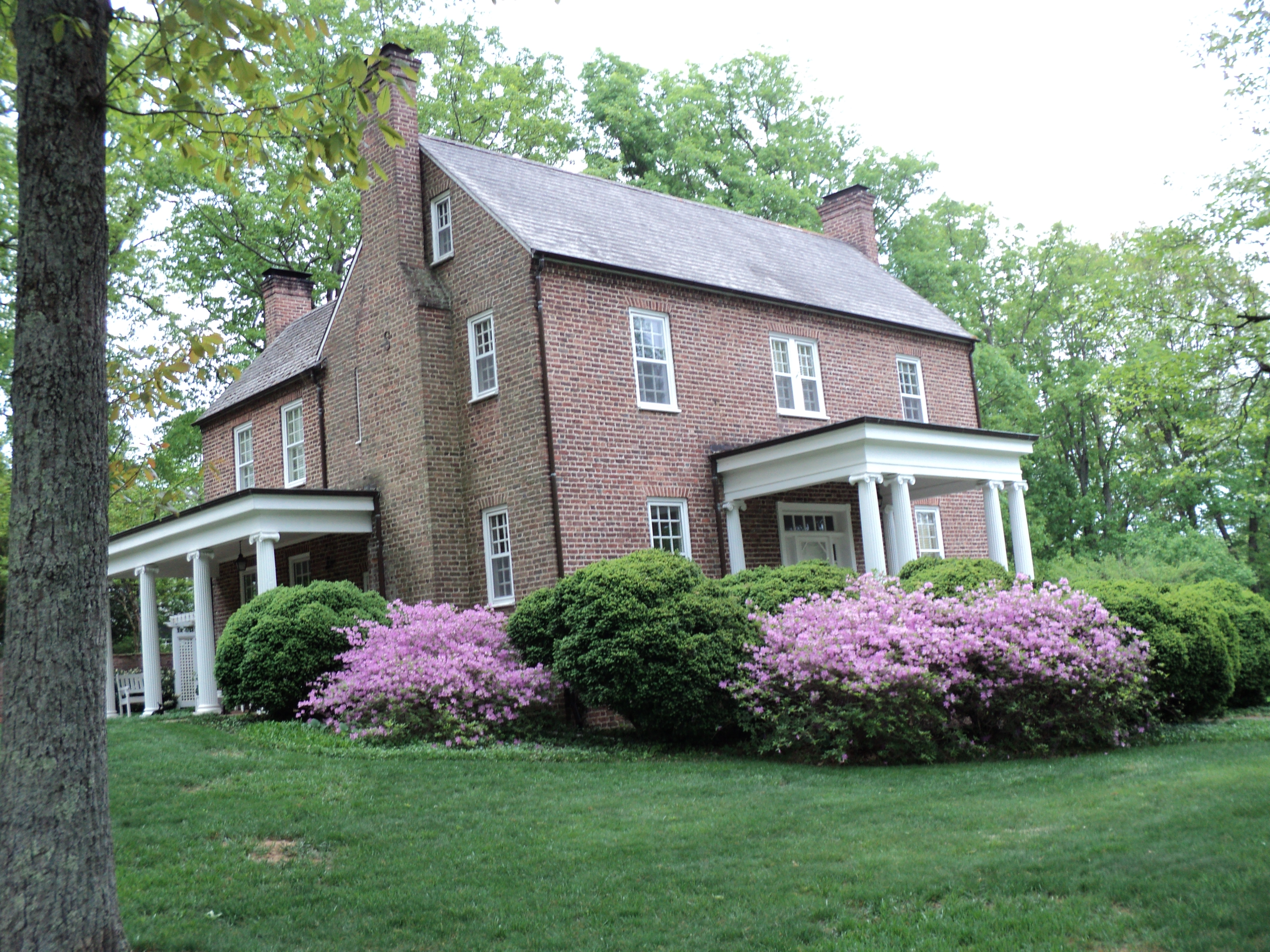
Greenwood, built by Col. Joseph Martin, son of General Joseph Martin, Jr., at Axton, Henry County, Virginia, 1808–1810

- Martinsville, Virginia
- Cumberland Gap
- Patrick Henry
- Rose Hill, Lee County, Virginia
- Battle of Kings Mountain
- Wilderness Road
- Wilderness Road State Park
- Thomas Sumter
- Benjamin Cleveland
- Richard Henderson (jurist)
- Treaty of Hopewell
