= Archibald Henderson (politician) =

American politician (1768–1822)

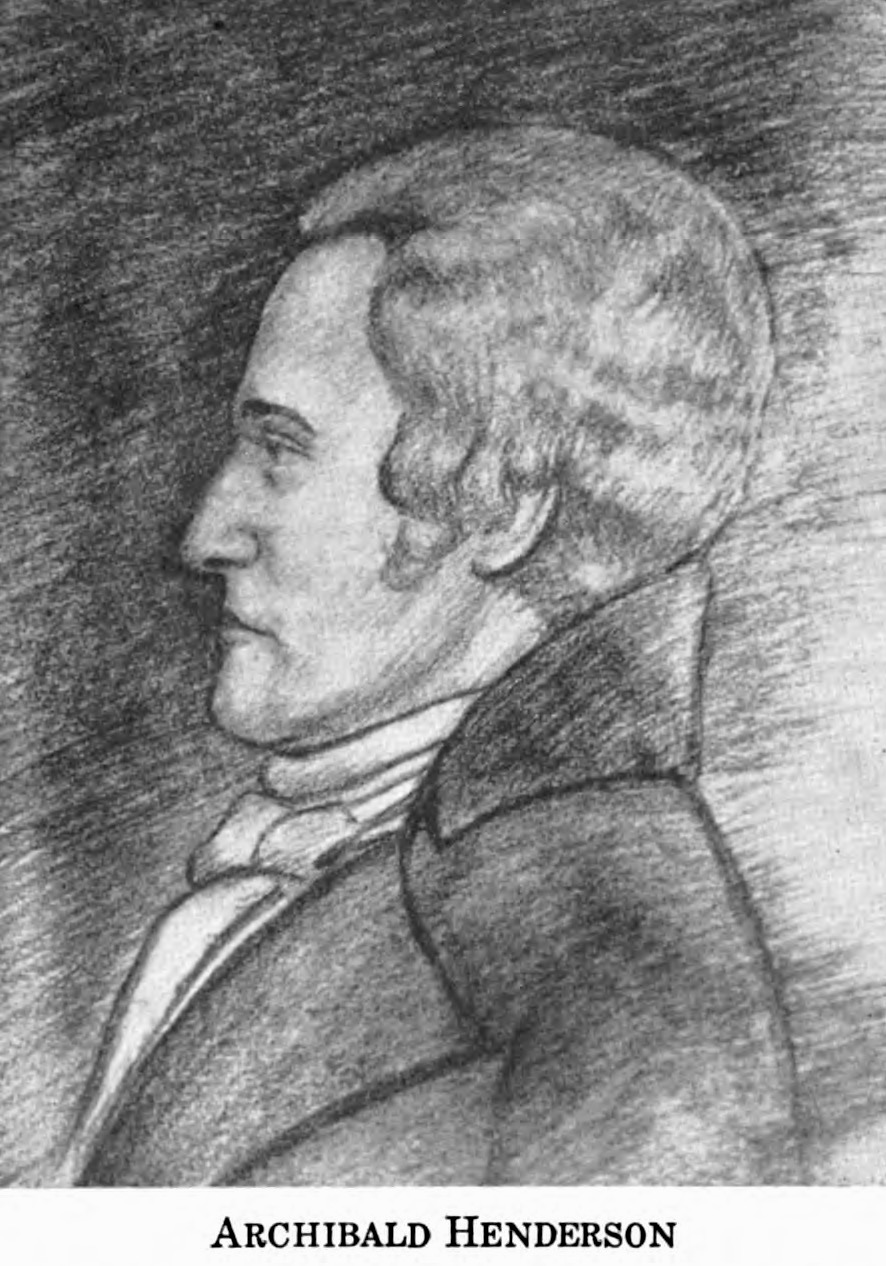

Member of the U.S. House of Representatives from North Carolina's 2nd district
- In office March 4, 1799 – March 3, 1803
- Preceded by: Matthew Locke
- Succeeded by: Willis Alston

Member of the North Carolina General Assembly
- In office 1807–1820

Personal details
- Born: August 7, 1768 Granville County, North Carolina, British America
- Died: October 21, 1822 (aged 54) Salisbury, North Carolina, U.S.
- Party: Federalist
- Parent: Richard Henderson (father)
- Relatives: Leonard Henderson (brother); Nathaniel Boyden (son-in-law)
- Occupation: Attorney, politician

Archibald Henderson (August 7, 1768 – October 21, 1822) was an American politician and lawyer who served from 1799 to 1803 as a U.S. representative from North Carolina.

== Biography ==
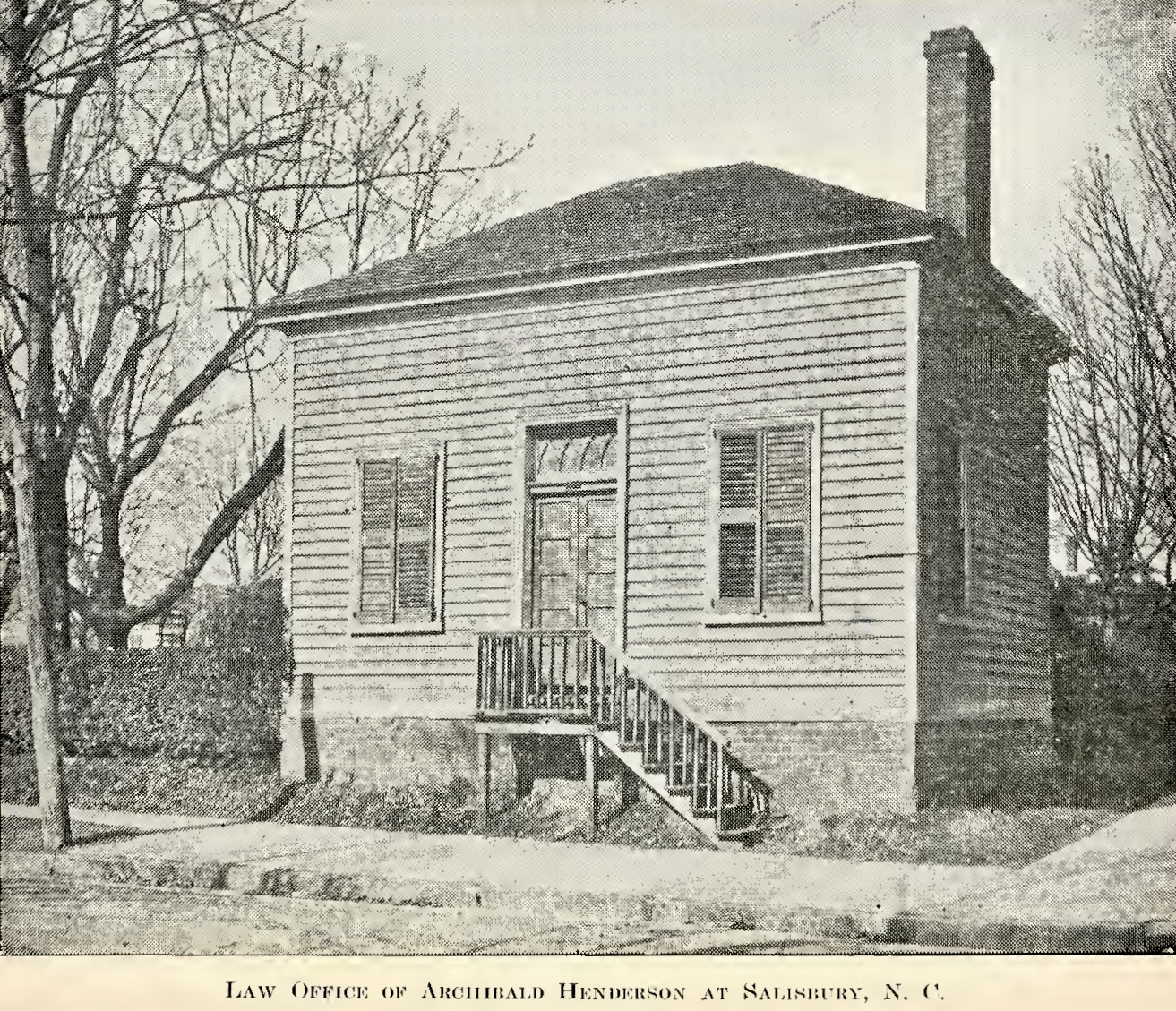
Law Office of Archibald Henderson at Salisbury, North Carolina

Henderson was born on August 7, 1768, near Williamsboro, Granville County, North Carolina. He was the son of jurist Richard Henderson, the brother of Chief Justice Leonard Henderson, and father-in-law of U.S. Congressman Nathaniel Boyden.

Henderson attended the Granville common schools, and graduated from Springer College. In c. 1790, he moved to Salisbury, North Carolina, where he studied law, and was admitted to the bar and commenced practice in Salisbury. The Archibald Henderson Law Office at Salisbury was listed on the National Register of Historic Places in 1972.

He was clerk and master in equity from 1795 to 1798. Henderson was elected as a Federalist to the Sixth and Seventh United States Congress (March 4, 1799 – March 3, 1803).

He was a member of the North Carolina General Assembly 1807–1809, 1814, 1819, and 1820. He then resumed the practice of law in Salisbury.

== Death ==
Henderson died on October 21, 1822, in Salisbury, North Carolina. Interment was in the City Cemetery.

== See also ==
- Sixth United States Congress
- Seventh United States Congress

U.S. House of Representatives
Preceded by Matthew Locke	Member of the U.S. House of Representatives from North Carolina's 2nd congressional district 1799–1803	Succeeded by Willis Alston
