= Caylor, Virginia =

Unincorporated community in Virginia, United States

- Unincorporated community
- Location within Virginia Location within the United States
- Coordinates: 36°37′50″N 83°29′40″W
- Country: United States
- State: Virginia
- County: Lee
- Elevation: 1,365 ft (416 m)
- Time zone: UTC-5 (Eastern (EST))
  - Summer (DST): UTC-4 (EDT)
- GNIS feature ID: 1494196

Caylor is an unincorporated community in Lee County, Virginia, United States. It had a post office from 1896 to 1904.

The community was to be named after T. A. Taylor, an original owner of the town site, but when the name was erroneously entered as Caylor, that name stuck.

The 12 roomed mansion in the Wilderness Road State Park was to remain named "Karlan" in honor of the previous owners, Karl and Ann Harris. However, locals still refer to the mansion as "Elydale", in honor of Robert McPherson Ely, who named the house "Elydale" when it was built in 1878. Two years after building the house, Robert Ely went swimming and caught typhoid fever, and died in 1880. His widow remarried to Thomas A. Taylor in 1885, and when a railroad stop was placed nearby, a mapping error called this "Caylor, Virginia".
