= Wilderness Road State Park =

State park in Virginia, USA

Coordinates: 36°38′2″N 83°31′25″W

Wilderness Road State Park, Virginia, USA
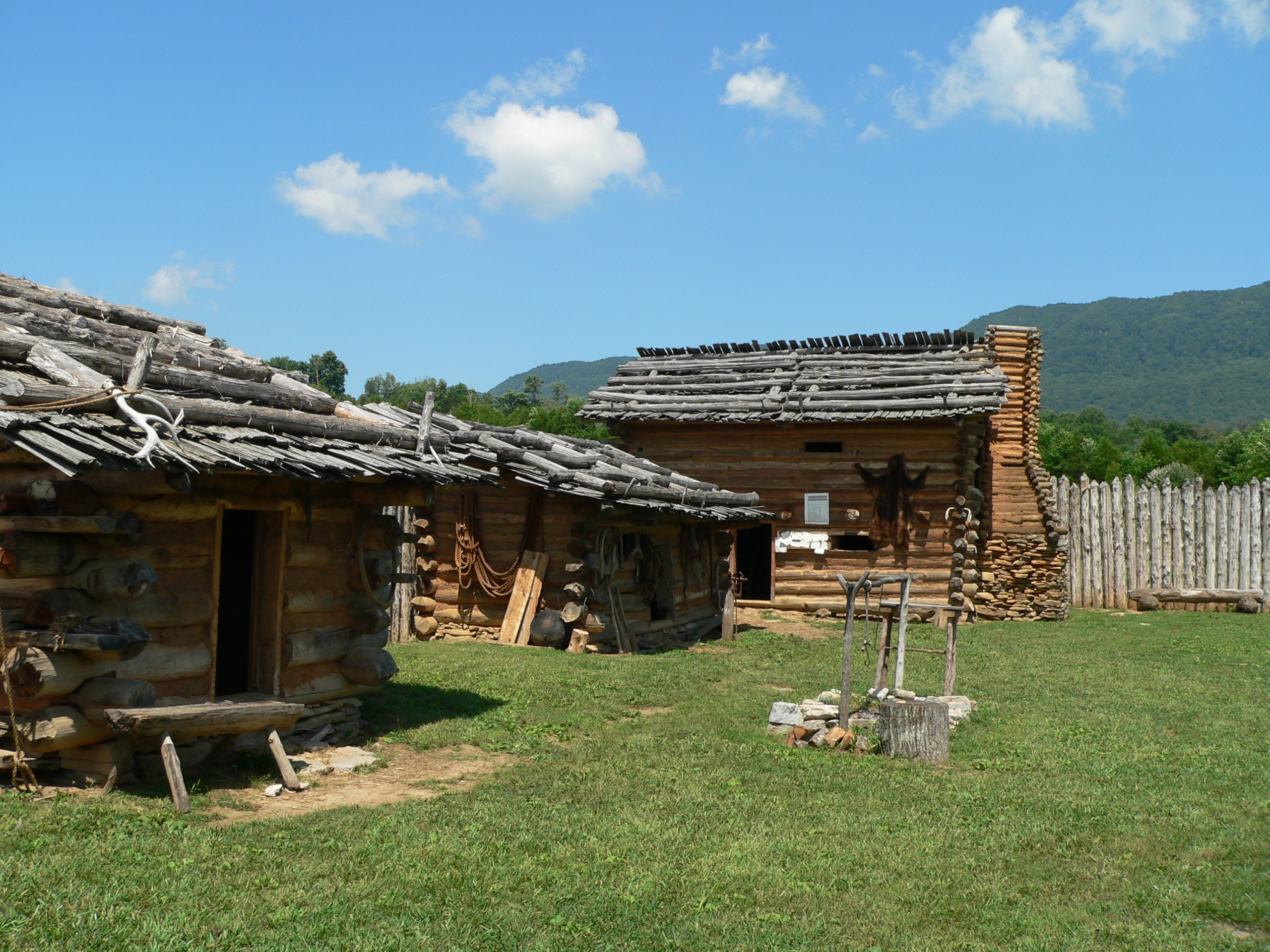
- Inside the reconstructed Martin's Station fort.

- Location within Virginia Location within the United States
- Location: Lee County, Virginia
- Area: 327 acres (132 ha)
- Established: 1993
- Visitors: 136,233 (in 2013)
- Governing body: Virginia Department of Conservation and Recreation

Wilderness Road State Park is a state park located in southwestern Virginia, near Cumberland Gap and Ewing, Virginia. It consists of about 310 acres (1.3 km^{2}) around the former Wilderness Road. Within it stand the Karlan Mansion and a replica of the original Martin's Station fort.

== Trails ==
Name	Mileage	Difficulty	Usage	Location
Wilderness Road Trail	8.49 Miles	Easy	Hiking, Biking, and Horseback Riding	Throughout Park, Parallel to U.S. 58
Indian Ridge Trail	0.77 Miles	Moderate	Hiking Only	Loop Trail, Starts Off of Route 690

== Historical significance ==
=== Wilderness Road ===
Wilderness Road was built by Daniel Boone in 1775. It was the first road to connect the interior of the country with the populated coastline, and allowed about 300,000 people to settle there after 25 years of use. Much of the original road's path is used by modern roads, but some areas, such as the area inside the park, have been preserved.

=== Martin's Station ===
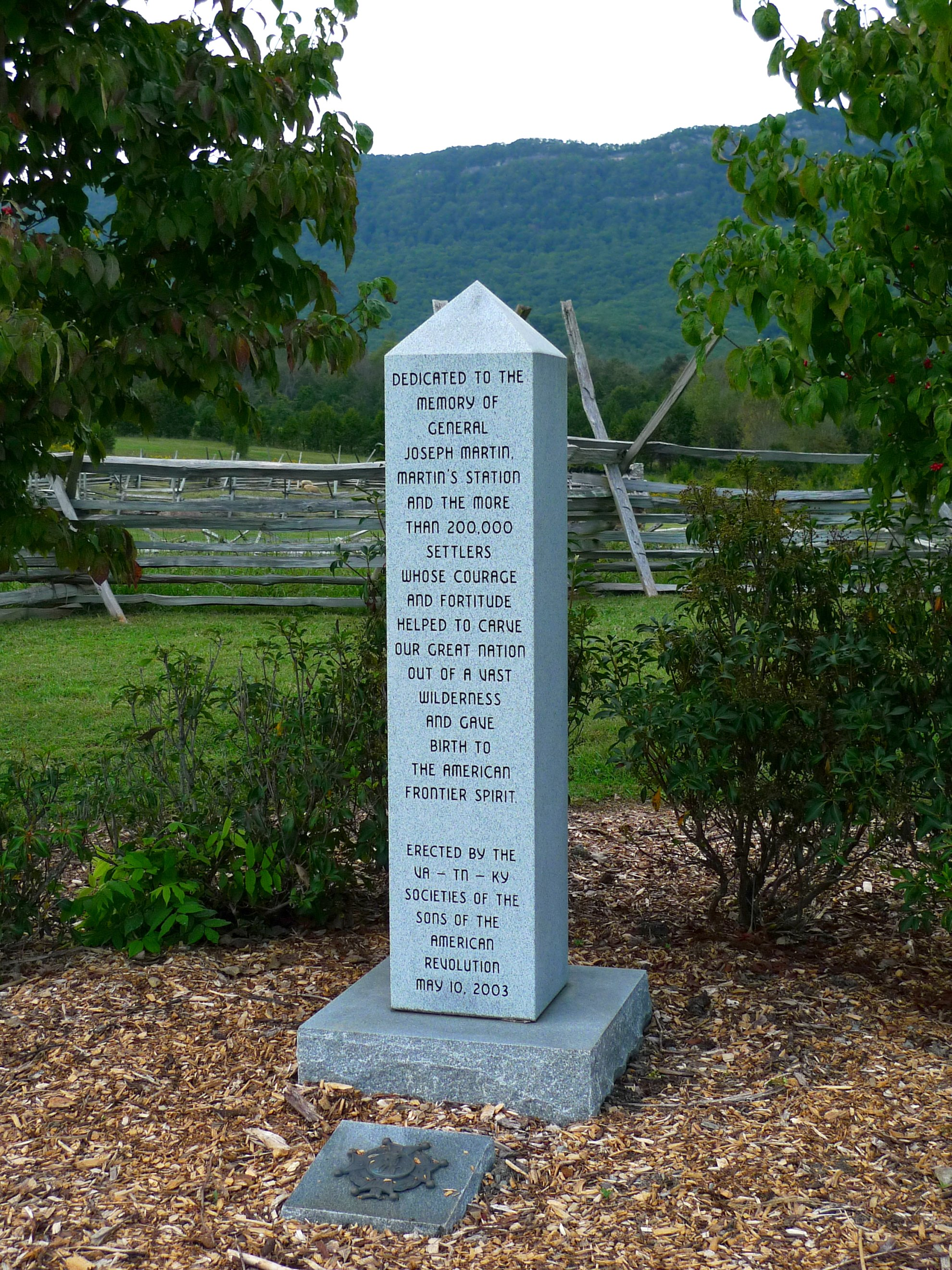
Dedicated to the Memory of General Joseph Martin, Martin's Station and the more than 200,000 settlers whose courage and fortitude helped to carve our great nation out of a vast wilderness and gave birth to the American frontier spirit

Martin's Station was a frontier fort originally located at nearby Rose Hill, Virginia. The station, consisting of several fortified cabins, was the only station between the start of the Wilderness Road at the blockhouse in Virginia and Crab Orchard on the edge of the Kentucky settlement – a distance of some 200 miles. "Throughout the period of the Wilderness Road's great activity it remained the important intermediate station," according to historian William Allen Pusey. The fort has been reconstructed today within the park. It is named for the early explorer of the region and namesake of Martinsville, Virginia, Brigadier General Joseph Martin.

=== Karlan Mansion ===
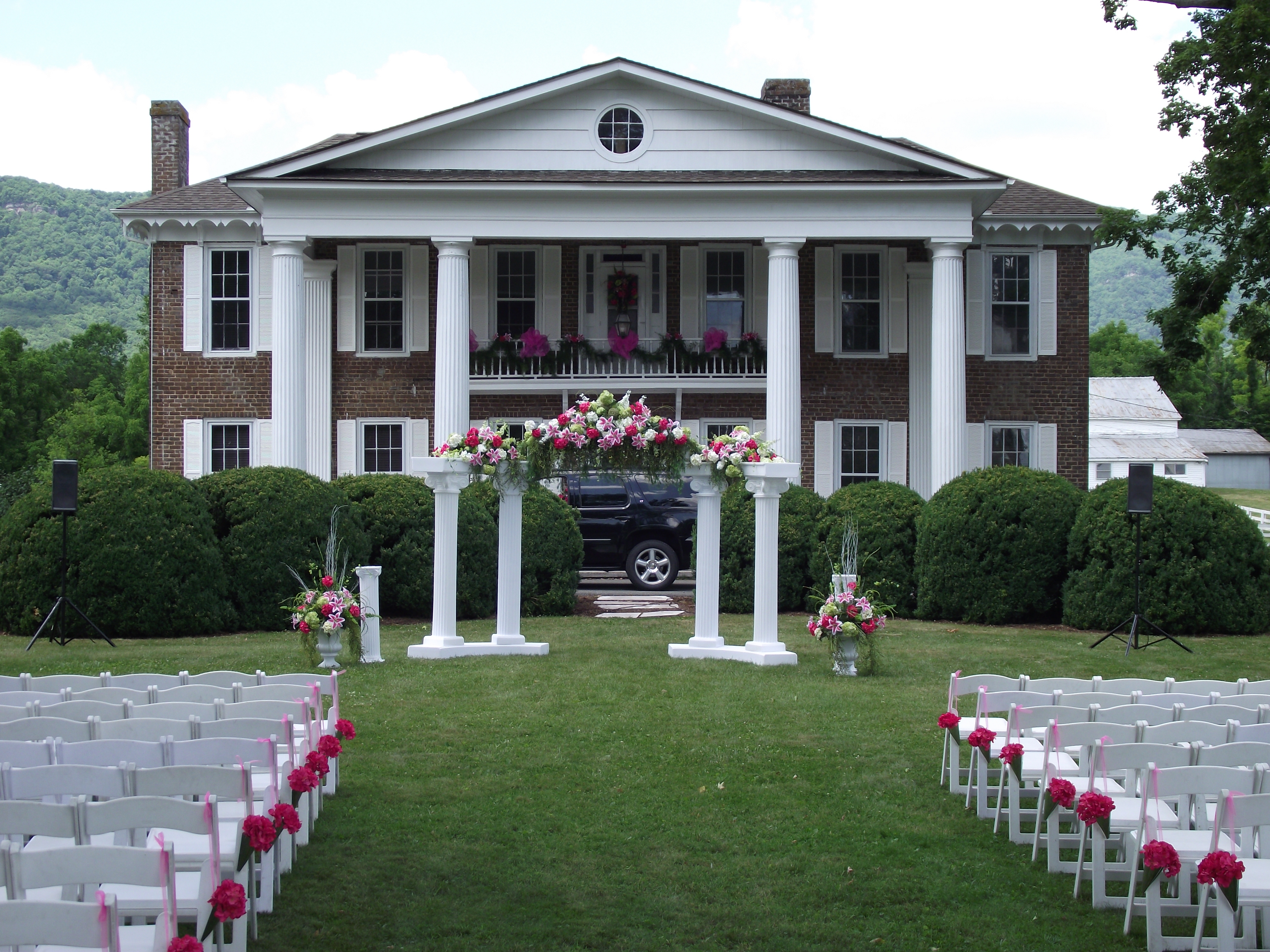
Karlan Mansion, bedecked for a wedding

This mansion was built on the farm of Robert M. Ely around 1870, and today it can be rented out for special events.

The 12-room mansion was to remain named "Karlan" in honor of the previous owners, Karl and Ann Harris. However, locals still refer to the mansion as "Elydale", in honor of Robert McPherson Ely, who named the house "Elydale" when it was built in 1878. Two years after building the house, Robert Ely went swimming and caught typhoid fever, and died in 1880. His widow remarried to Thomas A. Taylor in 1885, and when a railroad stop was placed nearby, a mapping error called this "Caylor, Virginia".

== See also ==
- List of Virginia state parks
- Cumberland Gap
