= Powell Mountain =

Appalachian mountain ridge

Coordinates: 36.511197°N 83.396292°W

Powell Mountain (or "Powells Mountain") is a mountain ridge of the Ridge-and-valley Appalachians of the Appalachian Mountains. It is a long and narrow ridge, running northeast to southwest, from about Norton, Virginia, to near Tazewell, Tennessee. It separates the Clinch River basin and the Powell River basin of Powell Valley. It was named for an 18th-century explorer.

== Geography ==
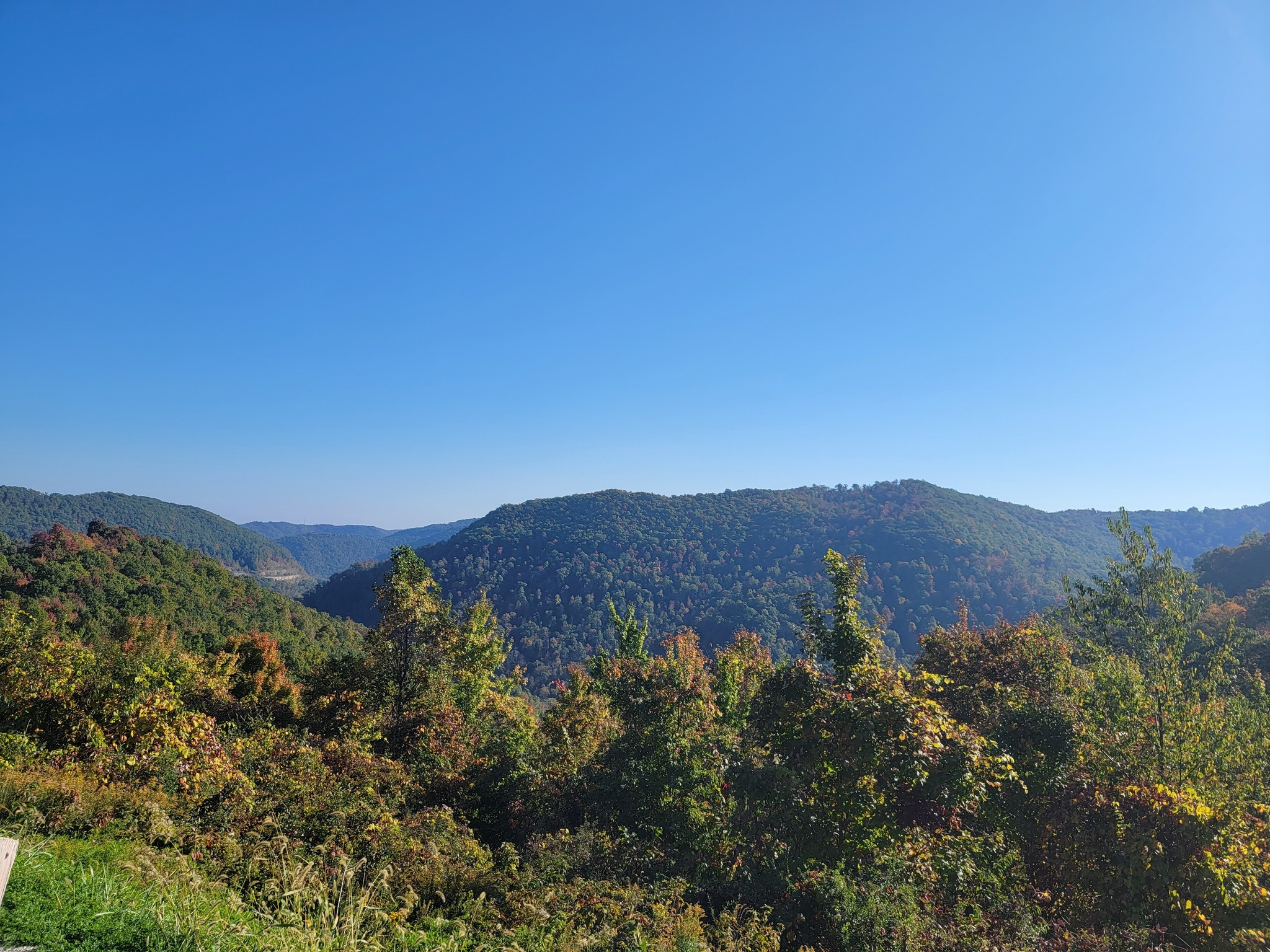
Powell Mountain from Route 19

Powell Mountain's elevation averages between 1,500 to 2,500 feet (460 to 760 meters), with its highest points above 3,000 feet (910 meters). The highest point is Bowling Knob (3,557 feet; 1,084 meters), near the northern end of the mountain. Powell Mountain is about 60 miles (97 km) long. It is broken by one stream only, the North Fork Clinch River. North of the river, the mountain is less well-defined as a ridge and merges with Stone Mountain and other mountains near the headwaters of Powell River. The southern part of Powell Mountain is paralleled on the south by Newman Ridge and Stone Ridge. Between Powell Mountain and these ridges is Snake Hollow and the headwaters of Blackwater Creek. This area is known for its historic Melungeon population. Powell Mountain is crossed by U.S. Route 58, called "Daniel Boone Trail Highway". The original Wilderness Road crossed the mountain nearby at Kanes Gap. Besides the large water gap of the North Fork Clinch River, there are numerous wind gaps. Some of the named gaps, from south to north, include Fugate Gap, Gibson Gap, Mulberry Gap (used by State Route 63), Bryson Gap, Sally Gap, Hunter Gap (used by State Route 70), Kanes Gap, Elisha Lick Gap, and Beaverdam Gap.

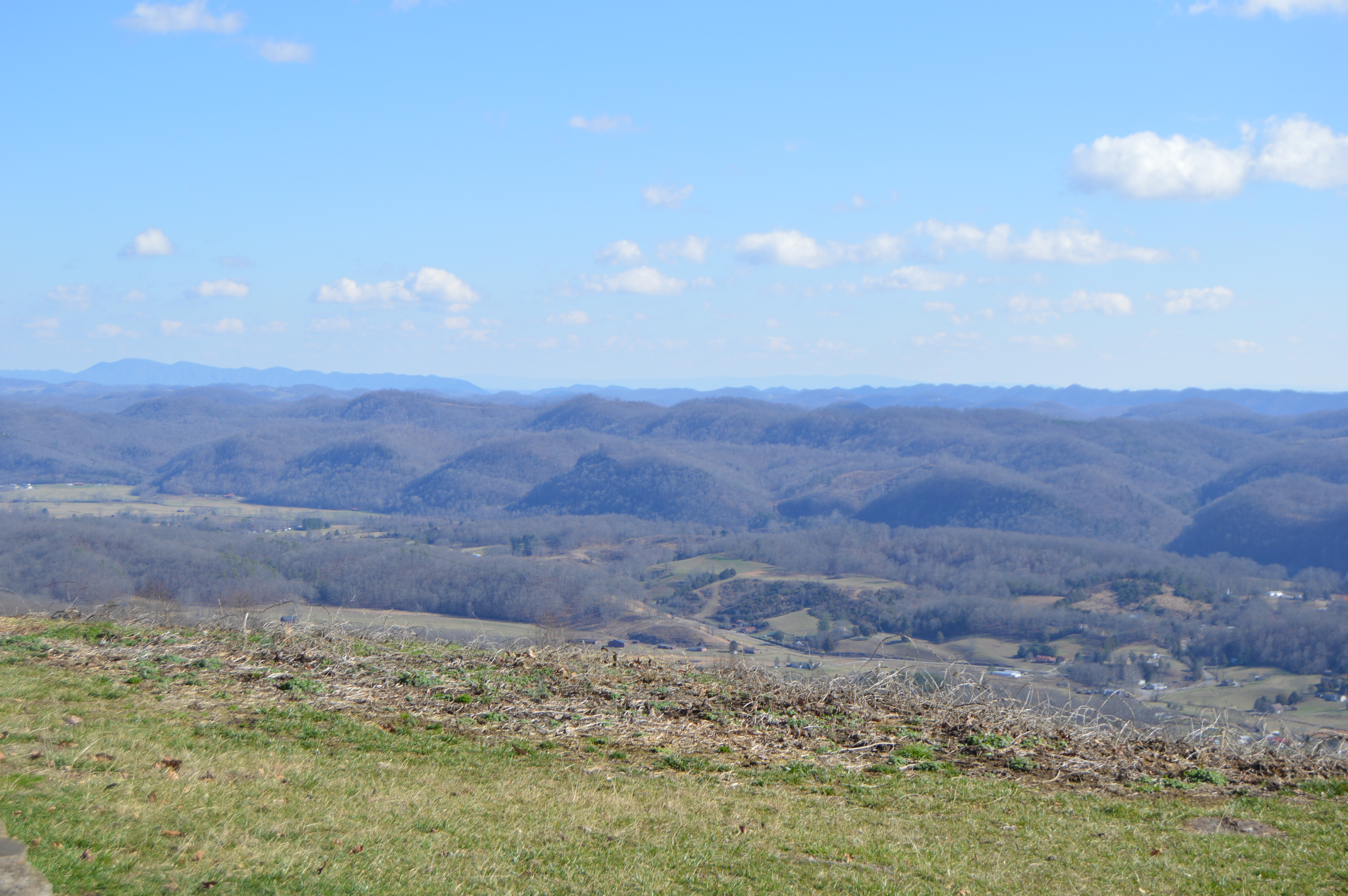
Powell Mountain in Scott County, Virginia

Powell Mountain's southern end is in Claiborne County, Tennessee. On the north side of the mountain flows Little Sycamore Creek, and on the south side, Big Sycamore Creek. The two join just south of the end of Powell Mountain, then flowing into the Clinch River and Norris Lake (the reservoir behind Norris Dam). To the northeast, Powell Mountain crosses Hancock County, Tennessee, where Newman Ridge runs closely along the south side. Big Sycamore Creek flows between the two ridges to its headwaters. Its valley is called Snake Hollow. Northeast of that, Blackwater Creek flows northeastward between Powell Mountain and Newman Ridge. In Hancock County, Powell Mountain reaches heights around 2,300 to 2,400 feet (about 700 to 730 meters), with the highest point, 2,501 feet (762 m)), on the Tennessee-Virginia state line. On the north side of Powell Mountain, Mulberry Creek flows southwestward to join the Powell River.

Continuing northeast, Powell Mountain crosses into Lee County, Virginia. Wallen Creek, a tributary of the Powell River, flows along the north side, while Blackwater Creek and its tributaries (themselves all branches of the Clinch River) flow on the south side. The Wilderness Road followed part of Wallen Creek, between Powell Mountain and Wallen Ridge. State Route 70 crosses Powell Mountain at Hunter Gap. North of Hunter Gap, Newman Ridge continues along the south side of Powell Mountain, but its name changes to Stone Ridge. Northeast of Hunter Gap, Powell Mountain's elevation increases to 2,500 feet (760 m) and above. The mountain becomes the boundary between Lee County and Scott County, Virginia. It is crossed by U.S. Route 58, "Daniel Boone Trail Highway". Daniel Boone's Wilderness Road route crossed Powell Mountain at Kanes Gap, just northeast of where the modern highway crosses.

The North Fork Clinch River breaks northeast of Kanes Gap, Powell Mountain. The mountain curves north and then west along the southwest side of the river, ending at a summit called "Butt of Powell Mountain" (elevation 2,859 feet (871 m)). US Route 23 and crosses Powell Mountain by following the North Fork Clinch River, as does railroad tracks owned by the Norfolk Southern Railway. Powell Mountain continues on the other side of the North Fork Clinch River, but is less well-defined as a ridge. It blends somewhat with Cliff Mountain, Little Mountain, and Stone Mountain. Near Cliff Mountain is the high summit of Bowling Knob (3,557 feet (1,084 m)). Nearby this section of Powell Mountain is Virginia's Natural Tunnel State Park. Also nearby is a section of the old Wilderness Road known as "Devil's Racepath". The crossing of Powell Mountain at Kanes Gap and the difficult Devil's Racepath made this one of the more difficult segments of the Wilderness Road.

The northernmost section of Powell Mountain crosses into Wise County, Virginia, where there is another high summit called Morris Butt (2,940 feet (900 m)). Northeast of that, the headwaters of the Powell River cut a valley into Powell Mountain near the community of Cracker Neck. Northeast of that, Powell Mountain becomes increasingly merged with Little Mountain, Stone Mountain, and Grindstone Ridge. In this section, the highest summit occurs, High Knob (4,223 feet (1,287 m)), but it is defined as the summit of Stone Mountain rather than Powell Mountain. Finally, Powell Mountain ends near Norton, Virginia. The northern terminus of Powell Mountain is in Jefferson National Forest.
