= Leonard Henderson =

American judge

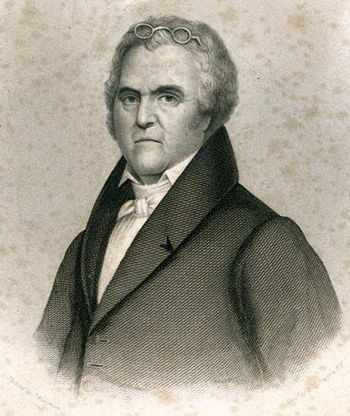
- Judge Leonard Henderson

Chief Justice of the North Carolina Supreme Court
- In office 1829–1833

Associate Justice of the North Carolina Supreme Court
- In office 1818–1829

Personal details
- Born: October 6, 1772; Granville County, Province of North Carolina, British America
- Died: August 13, 1833 (aged 60); Williamsboro, North Carolina, U.S.
- Parent: Richard Henderson (father)
- Relatives: Archibald Henderson (brother)
- Occupation: Jurist

Leonard Henderson (October 6, 1772 – August 13, 1833) was an American jurist who served as chief justice of the North Carolina Supreme Court from 1829 to 1833, and an associate judge of that court beforehand.

== Biography ==
Henderson was born in Granville County, North Carolina on October 6, 1772. His father, Richard Henderson, was a pioneer, state Superior Court judge and politician. His brother, Archibald Henderson, was a state legislator and member of the U.S. House of Representatives. He read law under his father's cousin, Judge John Williams.

Henderson served as a state superior court judge from 1808 until 1816. When the North Carolina General Assembly created the state Supreme Court in 1818, it elected Henderson as one of the first members of the three-judge court. The judges of the Court elected Henderson their Chief in 1829 after the death of Chief Justice Taylor. Henderson was also a trustee of the University of North Carolina at Chapel Hill.

Judge Henderson died in Williamsboro, in what is today Vance County, North Carolina, on August 13, 1833.

Henderson, North Carolina; Hendersonville, North Carolina; and Henderson County, North Carolina are named for him.

== Notes ==
Legal offices
Preceded by John Louis Taylor	Chief Justice of North Carolina Supreme Court; 1829–1833	Succeeded by Thomas Ruffin
