= Powell Valley =

Valley in Virginia, US

Coordinates: 36°52′13.54″N 82°44′55.10″W

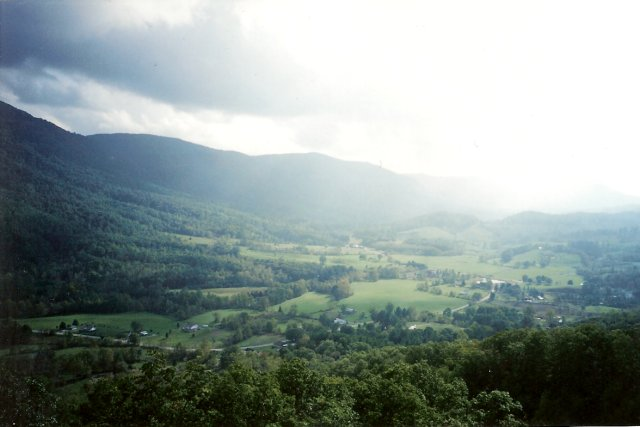
Powell Valley near Norton, VA

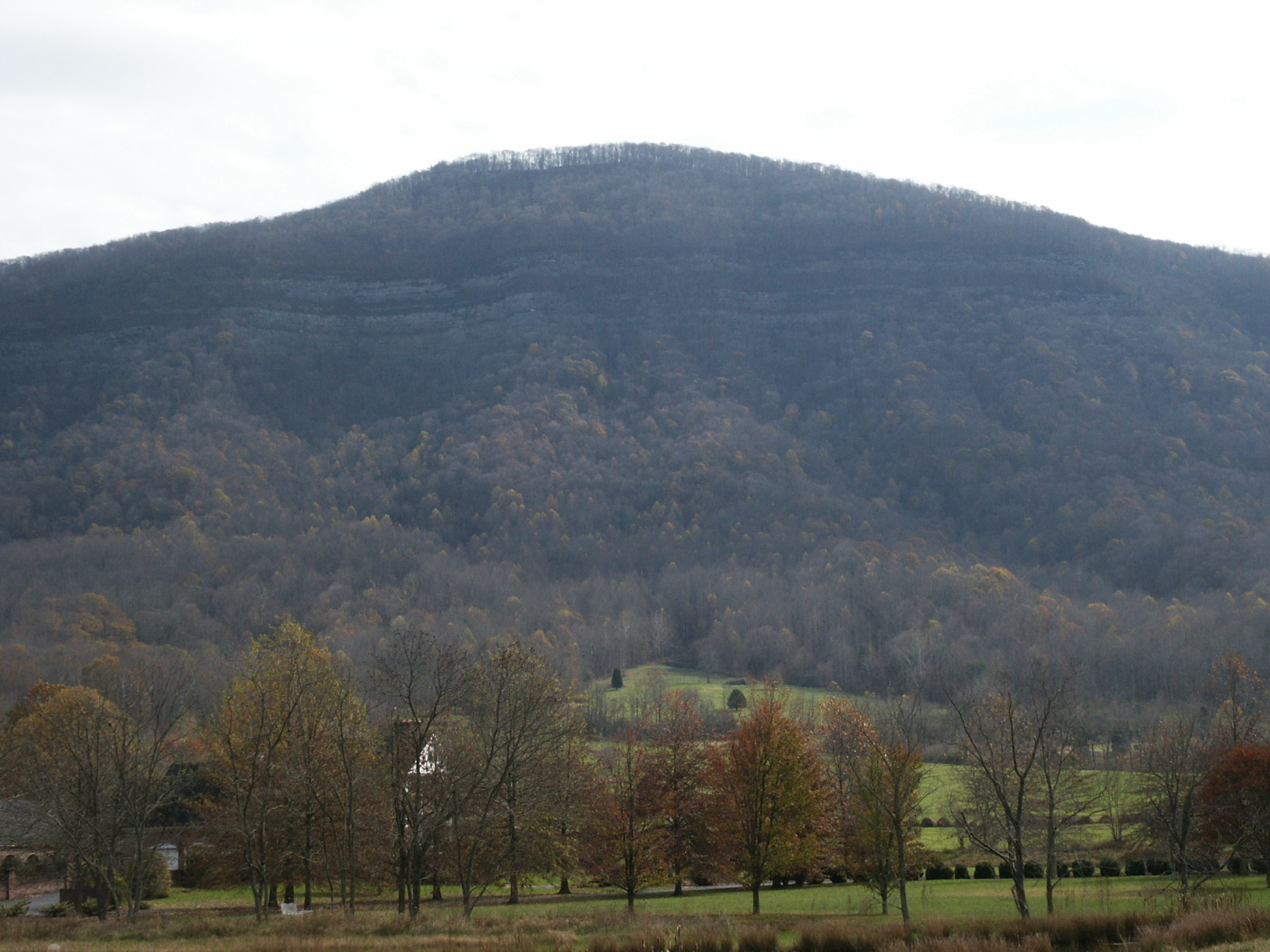
Looking up towards Grindstone Ridge from Powell Valley

Powell Valley in southwest Virginia, in the United States, is located near the city of Norton and the town of Big Stone Gap in Wise County, Virginia.

Powell Valley is a picturesque location, with an overlook accessible from the Northbound lanes of U.S. Route 23. A number of homes, farms, and a church are located in the valley below the overlook.

The valley begins between Powell Mountain and Little Stone Mountain where the waters of the Powell River flow down from the rugged mountains of western Wise County. The immense exposed rock face where Stone Mountain and Powell Mountain come together near Grindstone Ridge to the southeast from the overlook, yields a striking visual change in altitude. Within only 0.8 mile the vertical elevation changes by 2,000 feet (610 meters) ) across the northern face of the Grindstone Ridge Dome of the High Knob Massif, to mark one of the greatest short-distance vertical elevation changes in the southern Appalachians (the greatest found west of the Blue Ridge in Virginia ).

The valley follows the Powell River west towards the Tennessee border.

Powell Valley lies at the center of the High Knob Landform.

The Virginia longhunter, explorer and later Revolutionary War general Joseph Martin was instrumental in opening up Powell Valley to settlement from the east.
