= Rose Hill, Lee County, Virginia =

- Census-designated place
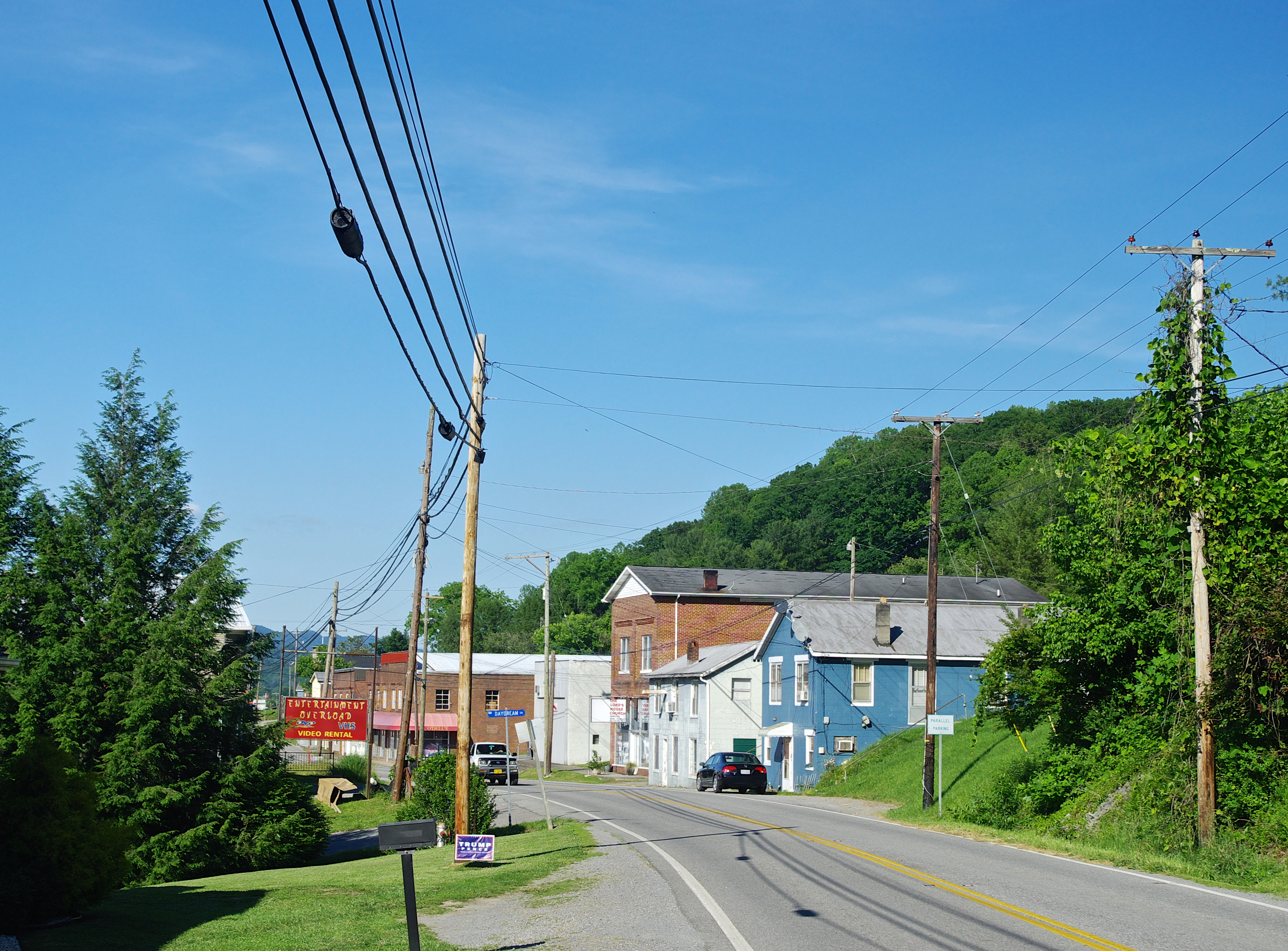
- Dr. Thomas Walker Road in Rose Hill

- Location in Virginia Location in the United States
- Coordinates: 36°40′19″N 83°22′12″W
- Country: United States
- State: Virginia
- County: Lee

Area
  - Total: 3.43 sq mi (8.88 km^{2})
  - Land: 3.43 sq mi (8.88 km^{2})
  - Water: 0 sq mi (0.0 km^{2})

Population (2020)
  - Total: 729
  - Density: 230/sq mi (90/km^{2})
- Time zone: UTC−5 (Eastern (EST))
  - Summer (DST): UTC−4 (EDT)
- ZIP code: 24281
- Area code: 276
- FIPS code: 51-68885
- GNIS feature ID: 1499986

Rose Hill is an unincorporated community and census-designated place (CDP) in Lee County, Virginia, United States. The population was 729 in 2020, 799 at the 2010 census, up from 714 at the 2000 census.

== Geography ==
Rose Hill is located in western Lee County at 36°40′19″N 83°22′12″W (36.672039, −83.370062). U.S. Route 58 passes through the north side of the community, leading east 15 miles (24 km) to Jonesville, the county seat, and west 18 miles (29 km) to Cumberland Gap, Tennessee. The Kentucky border is just over a mile to the northwest, on the crest of Cumberland Mountain.

According to the United States Census Bureau, the CDP has a total area of 3.4 square miles (8.9 km^{2}), of which 1.8 acres (7,485 m^{2}), or 0.08%, are water. The community is drained by White Branch, flowing into Martin Creek, which runs south to the Powell River in Tennessee and is part of the Tennessee River watershed.

== History ==
The Rose Hill post office was established in 1825. The community was likely named for rose bushes growing in the area.

=== Martin's Station ===
Rose Hill was the site of Martin's Station, the westernmost frontier fort built by Indian trader and later Brigadier General Joseph Martin, namesake of Martinsville, Virginia, and one of the first explorers of the Powell Valley. After Indian raids on his Powell Valley settlement, Martin abandoned his early fort. Six years later, in early 1775, Martin returned to the region and built the fort at Martin's Station in early 1775 on the north side of Martin's Creek. The wooden fort contained some six cabins built about 30 feet (9.1 m) apart, with stockades between the buildings. The fort was abandoned the following year after conflicts between settlers and Native Americans. Martin later sold his landholdings in Lee County, which totaled some 25,000 acres (100 km^{2}).

Today there is a replica of the fort at nearby Wilderness Road State Park.

== Demographics ==
Historical population
Census	Pop.	Note	%±
2000	714		—
U.S. Decennial Census; 2000 2010 2020

Rose Hill was first listed as a census designated place in the 2000 U.S. census.

As of the census of 2000, there were 714 people, 306 households, and 197 families residing in the CDP. The population density was 207.7 people per square mile (80.1/km^{2}). There were 344 housing units at an average density of 100.1/sq mi (38.6/km^{2}). The racial makeup of the CDP was 97.76% White, 0.98% African American, 0.14% Native American, 0.56% Asian, and 0.56% from two or more races. Hispanic or Latino of any race were 0.14% of the population.

There were 306 households, out of which 30.1% had children under the age of 18 living with them, 48.0% were married couples living together, 13.4% had a female householder with no husband present, and 35.3% were non-families. 33.0% of all households were made up of individuals, and 15.4% had someone living alone who was 65 years of age or older. The average household size was 2.33 and the average family size was 2.96.

In the CDP, the population was spread out, with 25.9% under the age of 18, 4.8% from 18 to 24, 29.6% from 25 to 44, 24.4% from 45 to 64, and 15.4% who were 65 years of age or older. The median age was 39 years. For every 100 females, there were 74.1 males. For every 100 females age 18 and over, there were 75.2 males.

The median income for a household in the CDP was $15,408, and the median income for a family was $15,833. Males had a median income of $23,500 versus $16,583 for females. The per capita income for the CDP was $9,652. About 36.4% of families and 40.8% of the population were below the poverty line, including 55.6% of those under age 18 and 35.9% of those age 65 or over.

== Notable people ==
- Pete DeBusk, businessman, founder of DeRoyal Industries
- Frank Rowlett, cryptologist, member of the Signal Intelligence Service
