= Sycamore Shoals State Historic Area =

State park in Elizabethton, Tennessee, US

Coordinates: 36°20′41″N 82°15′8″W

Sycamore Shoals State Historic Park
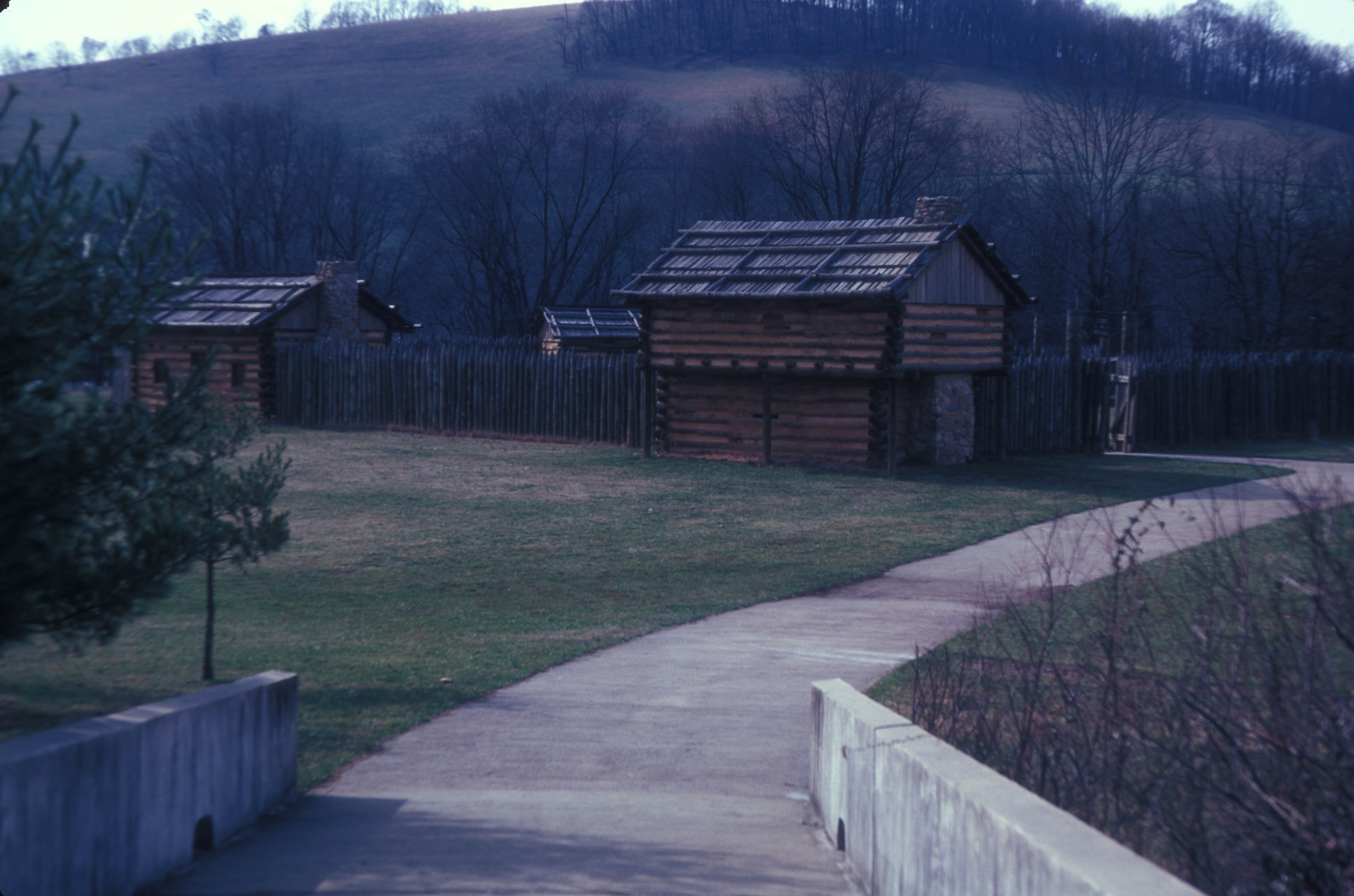
- Interactive map of Sycamore Shoals State Historic Park
- Location: Elizabethton, Carter County, Tennessee
- Area: 70 acres (28.3 ha)
- Created: 1975
- Operator: Tennessee Department of Environment and Conservation
- Website: Sycamore Shoals

Sycamore Shoals State Historic Park is a state park located in Elizabethton, in the U.S. state of Tennessee. The park consists of 70 acres (28.3 ha) situated along the Sycamore Shoals of the Watauga River, a National Historic Landmark where a series of events critical to the establishment of the states of Tennessee and Kentucky, and the settlement of the Trans-Appalachian frontier in general, took place. Along with the historic shoals, the park includes a visitor center and museum, the reconstructed Fort Watauga, the Carter House (at a satellite location in Elizabethton) and Sabine Hill (also at a satellite location in Elizabethton). For over a thousand years before the arrival of European explorers, Sycamore Shoals and adjacent lands had been inhabited by Native Americans. The first permanent European settlers arrived in 1770, and established the Watauga Association—one of the first written constitutional governments west of the Appalachian Mountains—in 1772. Richard Henderson and Daniel Boone negotiated the Treaty of Sycamore Shoals in 1775, which saw the sale of millions of acres of Cherokee lands in Kentucky and Tennessee and led to the building of the Wilderness Road. During the American Revolution, Sycamore Shoals was both the site of Fort Watauga, where part of a Cherokee invasion was thwarted in 1776, and the mustering ground for the Overmountain Men in 1780.

== Facilities ==
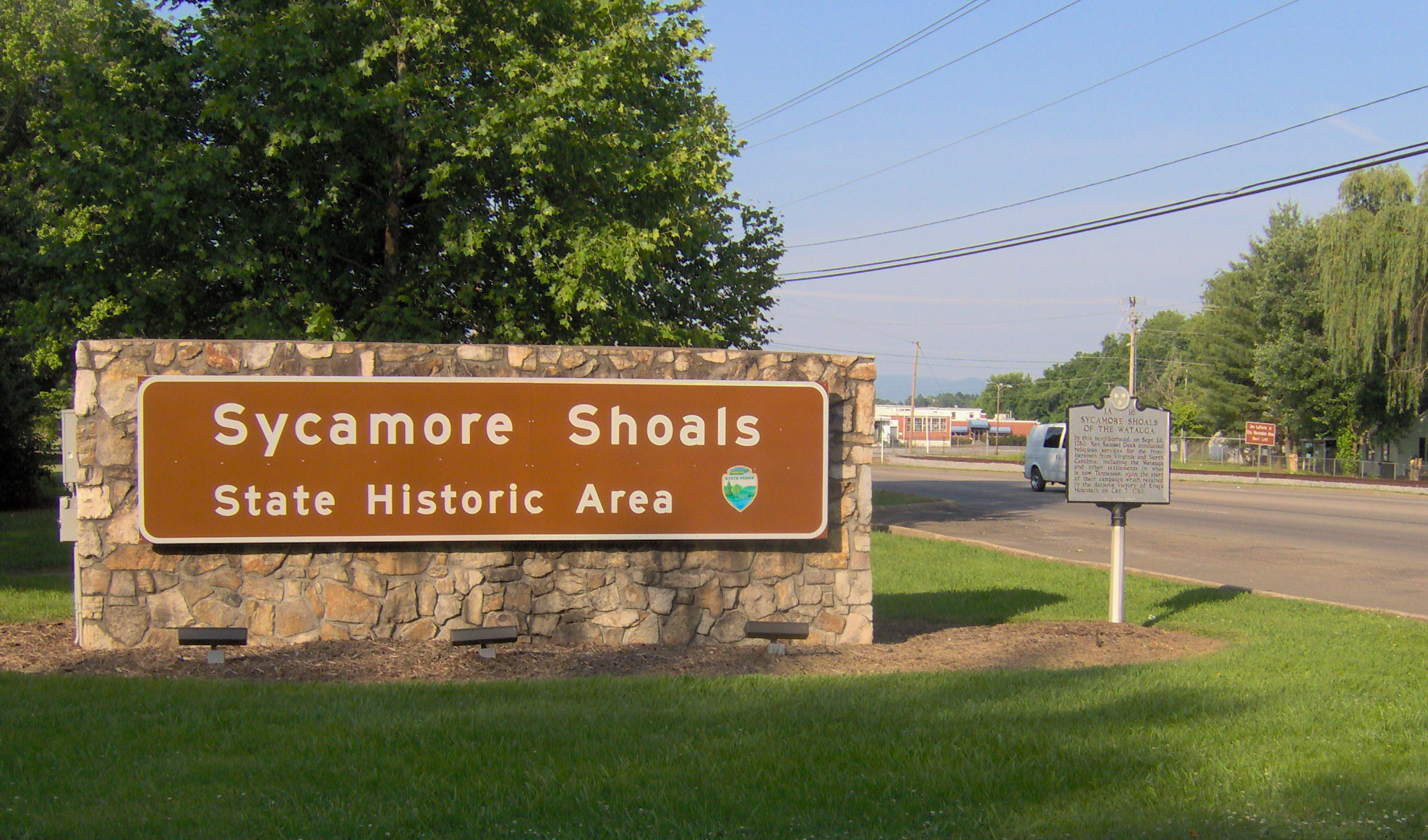
Park entrance and former park sign

The visitors' center at Sycamore Shoals State Historic Park houses interpretive displays about the area's history, a theater offering free screenings of a short documentary film narrated by John Cullum about the Overmountain Men and Revolutionary War history of the area, as well as park offices and a gift shop. A reconstruction of Fort Watauga, a fort originally built as Fort Caswell in the mid-1770s, is located behind the visitors center. The reconstructed fort's design is based on archaeological finds, scant historic descriptions of the fort, and the typical design of forts on the Appalachian frontier. Adjacent to the fort is a 450-seat amphitheater, which is the site of the Official Outdoor Drama of the State of Tennessee, Liberty: The Saga of Sycamore Shoals (formerly billed as The Wataugans). Picnic facilities are also located near the Visitor Center.

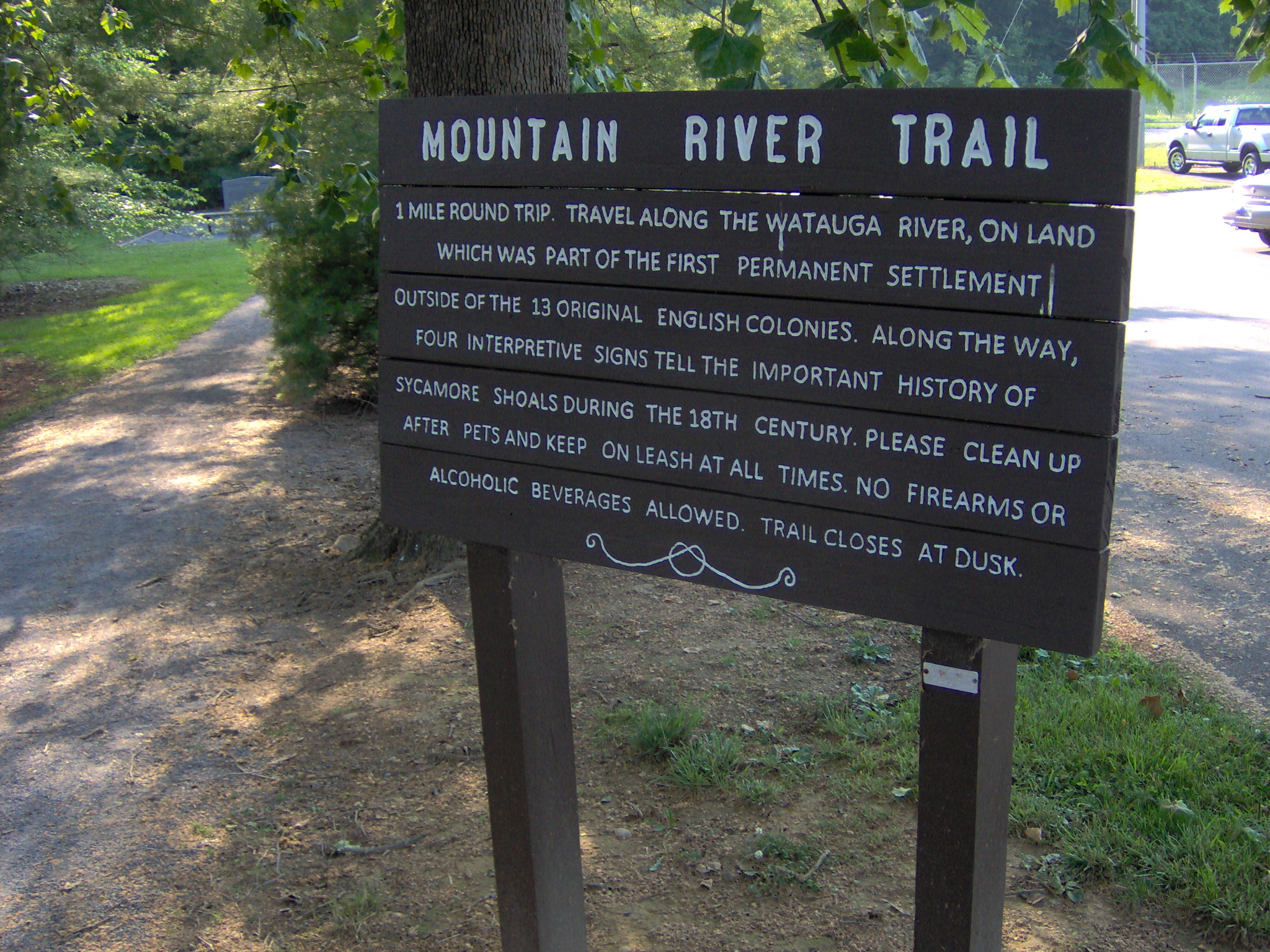
Mountain River trailhead

The 2-mile-loop (3 km), graveled Mountain River Trail follows the partially wooded south bank of the Sycamore Shoals of the Watauga River. Interpretive signs along the trail explain the various historical events that occurred at Sycamore Shoals.

The Sycamore Shoals State Historical Park is a recipient of a sycamore "Moon tree" that was grown from one of hundreds of tree seeds that were launched into space on board the Apollo 14 mission in 1971 as part of a joint project between NASA and the U.S. Forest Service. The seeds were germinated by the Forest Service upon return to Earth, and this tree was planted at the Sycamore Shoals State Historical Park in April 1976 as part of the celebration of the United States Bicentennial.

== Park areas ==
=== Main park area ===
The main park area consists of the historic Shoals, the visitor center, a picnic area and the reconstructed Fort Watauga. It is located on the west side of the city of Elizabethton along the river.

=== The Carter Mansion ===
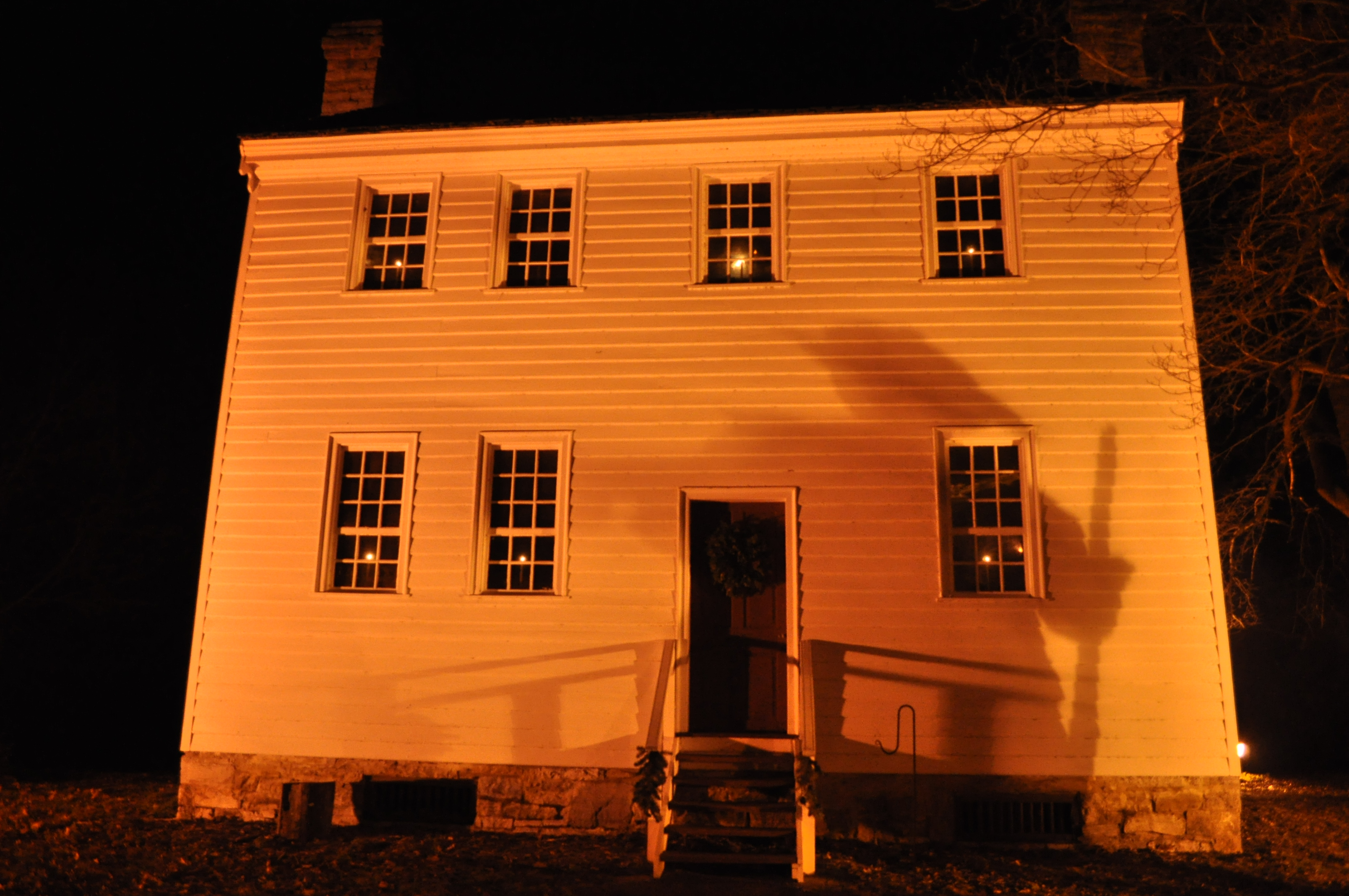
Carter Mansion ca. 1775-1780, oldest frame house in Tennessee

Listed on the National Register of Historic Places and built between 1775 and 1780, the Carter Mansion may be the only surviving material link to the Watauga Association and is the oldest frame house standing in Tennessee. John Carter and his son, Landon, built the frontier mansion, and the finely detailed interior and over-mantle paintings place the mansion among the most significant historic houses in Tennessee.

John and Landon Carter were both prominent in political and military affairs, serving during the American Revolution and several conflicts with Native Americans. When Tennessee was admitted into the United States in 1796, Carter County was named for Landon Carter, and the county seat of Elizabethton was named for his wife, Elizabeth Maclin Carter.

It is located on the east side of the city of Elizabethton.

=== Sabine Hill ===
On November 1, 2017 the Sabine Hill home and property was added to the park, as satellite property.

== Historical significance of the Park ==
=== Colonial settlement ===
Sycamore Shoals State Historic Area

The flatlands around Sycamore Shoals have been sporadically inhabited by Native Americans for thousands of years, and were probably cultivated during the Mississippian period (ca. 1000–1600 C.E.). When the first European explorers arrived in the area in the early 18th century, the Cherokee were using the flats as a gathering place for hunting expeditions. In the 1760s, long hunters and traders established stations and hunting camps in the Watauga Valley in the vicinity of Sycamore Shoals. These early explorers called the flats the Watauga "Old Fields" due to their resemblance to once-cultivated lands that had been left fallow.

In 1770, James Robertson (a later founder of Nashville) made an excursion into the Watauga Valley, possibly to locate settlement sites for families fleeing the turmoil of the Regulator Movement in his native North Carolina. A trader pointed Robertson to the Old Fields, which Robertson later described as a "Promised Land" and planted a corn crop and built a cabin and corn crib. Robertson then departed for North Carolina, but returned to the Old Fields, a few months later, with several families to establish what became known as the Watauga settlement.

=== Watauga Association ===
After surveyors placed the Watauga settlement and the other "south-of-Holston" settlements officially within the domain of the Cherokee tribe in 1771, Robertson negotiated a 10-year lease for the Watauga lands. Being outside the authority of any of the British colonies, the Watauga settlers established a regional constitutional government known as the "Watauga Association." Tragedy struck as the lease was being celebrated, when a Cherokee warrior was murdered by a white man. Robertson's skillful diplomacy made peace with the irate Cherokee, who threatened to expel the settlers by force if necessary.

=== American Revolution ===
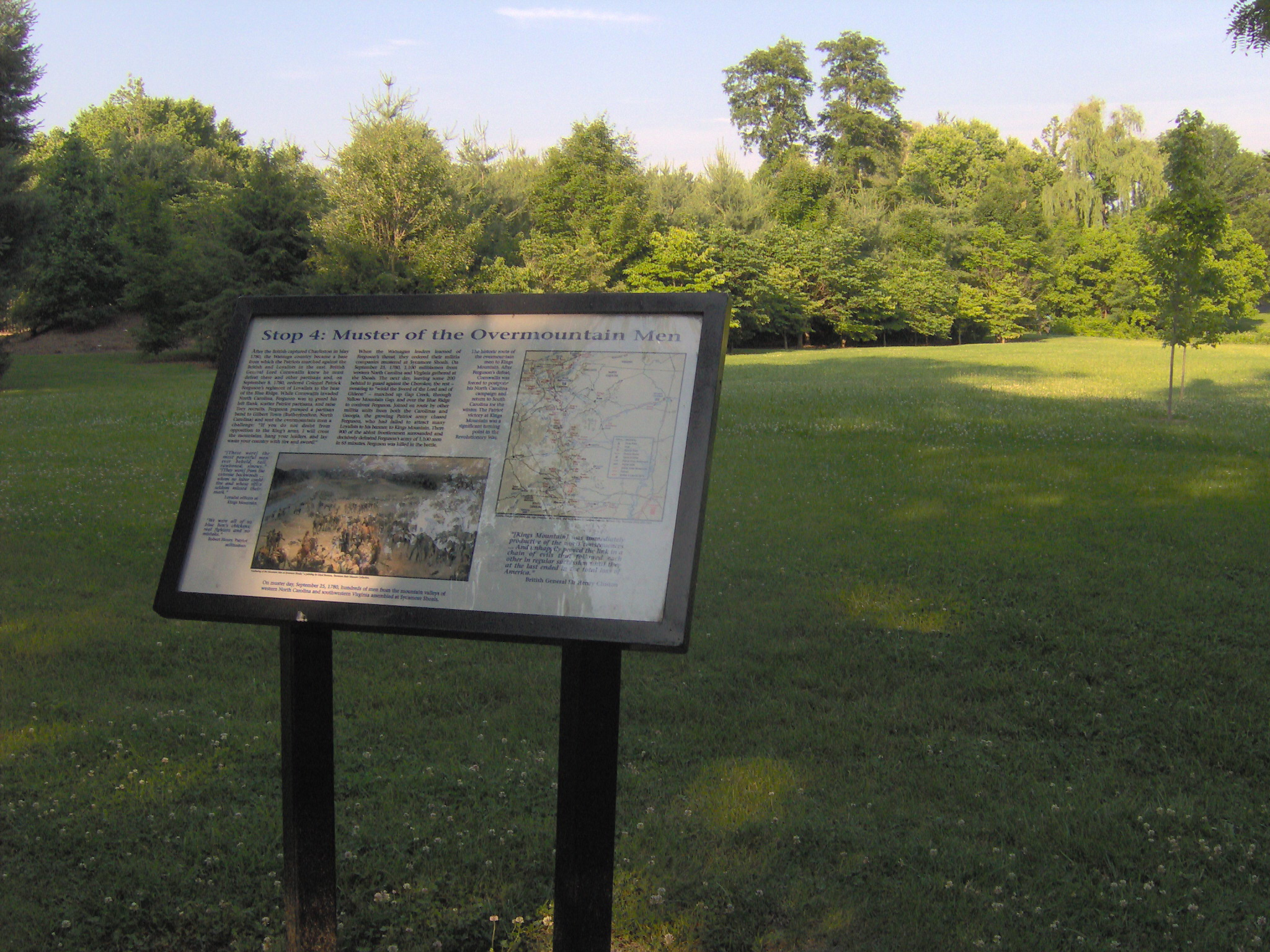
Interpretive sign at the park recalling the muster of the Overmountain Men

In March 1775, the Treaty of Sycamore Shoals, sometimes called the Transylvania Purchase, was signed by Richard Henderson and Cherokee leaders Attakullakulla and Oconastota. The treaty involved the purchase of some 20,000,000 acres (81,000 km^{2}) of land between the Kentucky River and the Cumberland River, which included a large part of what is now Kentucky and part of Tennessee. Henderson's purchase was in violation of the Royal Proclamation of 1763, however, which prohibited private purchase of American Indian land, and the Virginia and North Carolina assemblies refused to recognize it. The purchase, nevertheless, led to the blazing of the Wilderness Road by Daniel Boone.

In the weeks following the Treaty of Sycamore Shoals, a faction of Cherokee opposed to the sale, led by Dragging Canoe, aligned themselves with the British with plans to drive the settlers back across the Appalachian Mountains. The Watauga and Nolichucky settlers organized themselves into the Washington District and formed a Committee of Safety, which acquired arms and built forts, including Fort Watauga. In July 1776, the Cherokee invaded the south-of-Holston settlements. On July 21, 1776, a Cherokee invasion force attacked Fort Watauga, but was thwarted by the fort's garrison, which was led by John Carter, James Robertson, and John Sevier.

On September 25, 1780, Sycamore Shoals served as the staging area for the Overmountain Men, the frontier militia that crossed the mountains to engage and defeat an army of British loyalists at the Battle of Kings Mountain in South Carolina. Overmountain Men had previously fought at the Siege of Charleston (these included what one historian dubbed the first "Tennessee volunteers") and the Battle of Musgrove Mill, both in 1780, and participated in two campaigns against the Cherokee, in 1776 and 1780. William Tatham, Watauga Association clerk and drafter of the Watauga Petition, was present at the Battle of Yorktown in 1781.

== Annual events ==
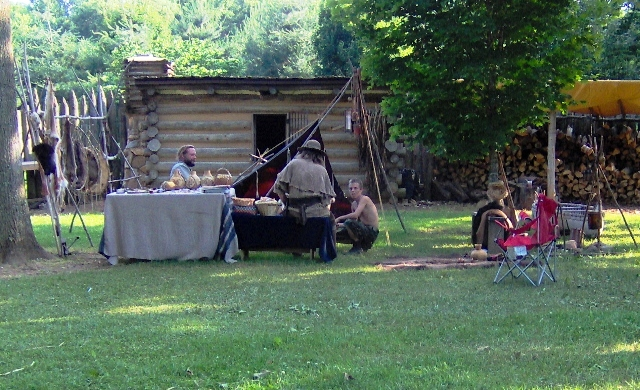
A reenactment at Fort Watauga, June 2009

- Traditional Arts Workshops, January–December
- Garrisons and Living History Weekends, January–December
- Sunday Jams at the Carter Mansion and the Shoals, January–October
- Mountain River Concerts, January–October
- Muster at Fort Watauga, May
- Native American Festival, June
- Colonial Kids Day Camp, June
- Liberty! The Saga of Sycamore Shoals, The Official Outdoor Drama of the State of Tennessee, July
- Watauga Valley Art League Art Show and Competition, July
- Carter Mansion Celebration, August
- Overmountain Victory Trail Celebration, September
- Fort Watauga Knap-In, October
- Mysterious Candlelight Tours of the Carter Mansion, October

== See also ==
- List of the oldest buildings in Tennessee
