= Wataugans =

Wataugans may refer to:

- The Wataugans, the former name of the play Liberty! The Saga of Sycamore Shoals
- Watauga Association, a government in the 1770s
- People living along the Watauga River
- Residents of Watauga County, North Carolina
