= Elizabethton Covered Bridge =

- U.S. Historic district – Contributing property
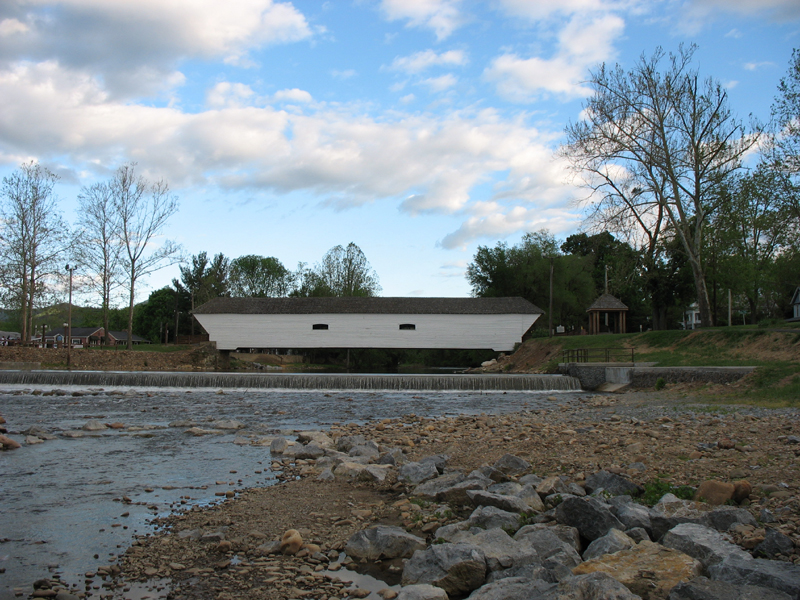

- Location within Tennessee Location within the United States
- Location: Doe River at Elizabethton
- Coordinates: 36.3473°N 82.2118°W
- Area: 62 acres (25 ha)
- Built: 1882
- Part of: Elizabethton Historic District (ID73001754)
- Designated CP: March 14, 1973

The Elizabethton Covered Bridge is a 134-foot (41 m) covered bridge over the Doe River in Elizabethton, the county seat of Carter County, Tennessee.

The Elizabethton Covered Bridge was constructed in 1882 and connects 3rd Street and Hattie Avenue.

== Features ==
Structurally, the Elizabethton Covered Bridge contains one span, a covered wooden Howe truss (typically constructed of timber diagonals and iron verticals) that is 137 feet (42 m) long. The total length is 154.3 feet (47.0 m). The covered bridge contains one traffic lane and a single walkway, while the curb-to-curb width is 16.4 feet (5.0 m) and the out-to-out width is 20.4 feet (6.2 m). The bridge substructure is masonry, stone, and concrete. Each end of the bridge features a projecting truncated gabled roofline.

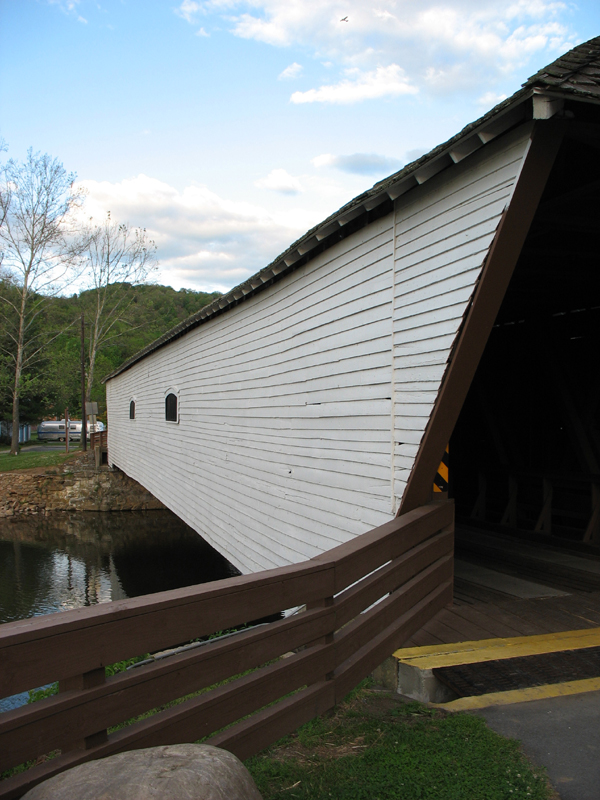
Elizabethton Covered Bridge

While allowing for pedestrian and bicycle transit over the Doe River, the Elizabethton Covered Bridge is now closed to all motor vehicle traffic.

=== History: "five dollar bridge" ===
As the county seat, Elizabethton grew throughout the 19th century. However, Lynn Mountain hemmed it in to the east and the Watauga River lay to the north. The Doe River flooded often and limited growth to the south. To span westward, to the site of the current downtown, the city would need a bridge over the Doe River. After extensive debate, in 1882 the Carter County Court approved $3,000 for the bridge and $300 for approaches. The court appointed a committee to select a site for the bridge. However, the committee encountered an unexpected problem — the men could not find a qualified contractor to erect the bridge.

After county officials were unable to find a bridge contractor, a local doctor, E. E. Hunter, accepted the contract and hired experienced people to work on the bridge. Hunter selected Thomas Matson, who had been an engineer for the narrow gauge East Tennessee and Western North Carolina Railroad as an engineer and architect. Hunter referred to the bridge as his "five dollar bridge" since he made a profit of $5 as contractor.

Although logs from a lumber operation and a barn were thrown against the covered bridge and its supports during a disastrous flood in 1901, this was the only major bridge in the area to survive.

== June covered bridge festival, parades ==
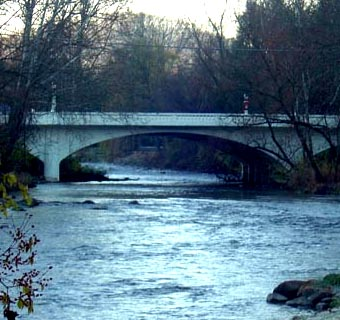
Broad Street Bridge

Originating on the side of Roan Mountain, the Doe River eventually flows by the East Side neighborhood in Elizabethton and parallel with Tennessee State Route 67 before passing underneath the historic covered bridge. Connecting 3rd Street to Hattie Avenue, the Elizabethton Covered Bridge, although now closed to motor vehicle traffic, is still open to both bicycles and pedestrians throughout the year.

Elizabethton Covered Bridge is adjacent to a large city park area with walking trails, baseball diamonds, and picnic areas and the covered bridge spans the Doe River connecting this city park area with the Elizabethton downtown business district.

Most of Elizabethton's downtown is listed on the National Register of Historic Places for its historical and architectural merits. The Elizabethton Historic District contains a variety of properties ranging in age from the late 18th century through the 1930s. However, the Elizabethton Covered Bridge is an important focal point and a well-known landmark in the state that pre-dates much of the downtown construction fueled by the rayon boom of the mid-to-late 1920s. In addition to the Covered Bridge, the downtown historical district also contains the 1928 Elk Avenue concrete arch bridge, and just a little further downstream on the Doe River, Tennessee State Route 67 passes another similar concrete arch bridge, locally known as the Broad Street Bridge.

Elizabethton celebrates in the downtown business area for one week each June with the Elizabethton Covered Bridge Days featuring country and gospel music performances, activities for children, Elk Avenue car club show, and many food and crafts vendors. The Elizabethton Covered Bridge is also along the Elk Avenue route for the annual Independence Day and Christmas parades.

== Connection with U.S. Interstate Highway System ==
Interstate 26 Exit 24 at Johnson City then east
US 321/Tennessee State Route 67 to Elizabethton, then
straight on Elk Avenue to downtown business district.

== See also ==
- Carter County, Tennessee
- Hampton, Tennessee
- Kings Mountain National Military Park
- Kings Mountain, North Carolina
- List of bridges documented by the Historic American Engineering Record in Tennessee
- Roan Mountain State Park
- Roan Mountain, Tennessee
- Overmountain Victory National Historic Trail
- Overmountain Men
- Watauga River
