= Elizabethton, Tennessee =

Elizabethton
- City
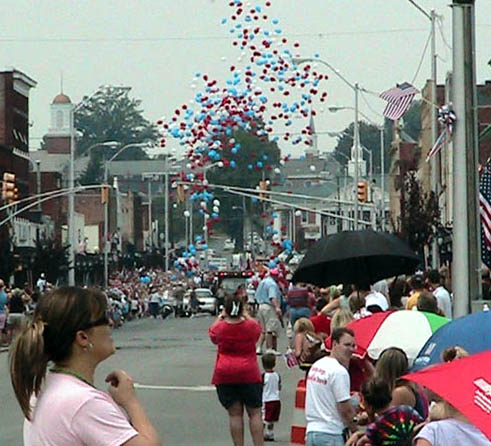
- Downtown Elizabethton, July 4 parade (2008)

- Flag Seal
- Nickname: The City of Power
- Location of Elizabethton in Carter County, Tennessee.

- Map spot for Elizabethton, Tennessee Elizabethton (the United States)
- Coordinates: 36°20′11″N 82°14′21″W
- Country: United States
- State: Tennessee
- County: Carter
- Explored: 1759
- Settled: 1769
- Founded: 1799
- Incorporated: May 13, 1905
- Named for: Elizabeth MacLin Carter

Government
  - Type: Council Manager
  - Mayor: William E. "Bill" Carter
  - Mayor Pro Tem: Mike Simerly
  - City Manager: Daniel Estes

Area
  - Total: 9.70 sq mi (25.11 km^{2})
  - Land: 9.55 sq mi (24.74 km^{2})
  - Water: 0.15 sq mi (0.38 km^{2})
- Elevation: 1,526 ft (465 m)

Population (2020)
  - Total: 14,546
  - Estimate (2026): 14,428
  - Density: 1,523.0/sq mi (588.02/km^{2})
- Time zone: UTC−5 (EST)
  - Summer (DST): UTC−4 (EDT)
- ZIP codes: 37643-37644
- Area codes: 423 and 729
- FIPS code: 47-23500
- GNIS feature ID: 1328127
- Website: www.elizabethton.org

Elizabethton (/əˈlɪzəbɛθtən/) is a city in, and the county seat of Carter County, Tennessee, United States. Elizabethton is the historical site of the first independent American government (known as the Watauga Association, created in 1772) located west of both the Eastern Continental Divide and the original Thirteen Colonies.

The city is also the historical site of the Transylvania Purchase (1775), a major muster site during the American Revolutionary War for both the Battle of Musgrove Mill (1780) and the Battle of Kings Mountain (1780). It was within the secessionist North Carolina "State of Franklin" territory (1784–1788).

The population of Elizabethton was enumerated at 14,546 during the 2020 census.

== History ==
=== Native American inhabitants ===
The area that is now Tennessee was first settled by Paleo-Indians nearly 11,000 years ago. The names of the cultural groups that inhabited the area between first settlement and the time of European contact are unknown, but several distinct cultural phases have been named by archaeologists, including Archaic, Woodland, and Mississippian. Chiefdoms of the Mississippian culture preceded the historic Muscogee (also known as Creek) people who inhabited the Tennessee River Valley. They were pushed out of eastern Tennessee by Cherokee migration into the river's headwaters and lower areas in the eastern part of what became the state.

When Spanish explorers first visited Tennessee, led by Hernando de Soto in 1539–43, it was inhabited by tribes of Muscogee and Yuchi people. Possibly because of European diseases devastating the Native tribes, which would have left a population vacuum, and also from expanding European settlement in the north, the Cherokee migrated south through the mountains from the area that is now Virginia. They occupied an area incorporating western North and South Carolina, northeastern Georgia and Alabama.

As European-American settlers expanded through the Province of Carolina, they came into armed conflict and forcibly displaced native populations over time to the south and west. The increasing European population kept up the pressure against Native Americans, who were eager for their land. In 1830, Congress passed the Indian Removal Act and the United States military enforced the removal of nearly all Muscogee and Yuchi peoples, the Chickasaw, Choctaw and Cherokee. The latter were the last holdouts, but, from 1838 to 1839, nearly 17,000 Cherokee were forced to walk overland from "emigration depots" in Alabama and Eastern Tennessee, such as Fort Cass, to Indian Territory west of Arkansas. (They were transported by boat across the Mississippi River.) This came to be known as the Trail of Tears, an estimated 4,000 Cherokees died along the way.

=== Colonial settlement ===
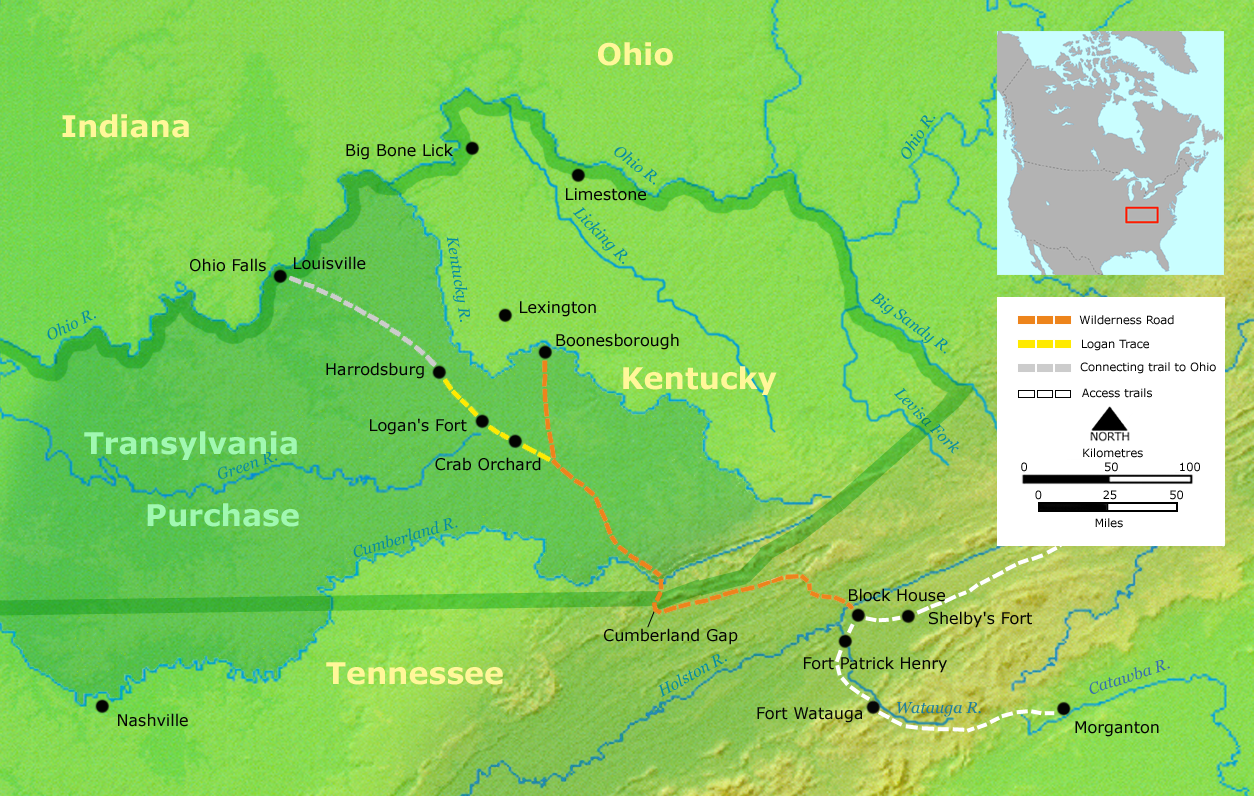
The Transylvania Purchase at Sycamore Shoals in Elizabethton and the Wilderness Road into Kentucky

In 1769, a young James Robertson accompanied explorer Daniel Boone on his third expedition to lands beyond the Allegheny Mountains. The party discovered the "Watauga Old Fields" (lands previously cultivated by generations of Native Americans) along the Watauga River valley at present-day Elizabethton, which Robertson planted with corn while Boone continued on to Kentucky. By 1769 Boone had formed an association with North Carolina promoter and judge Richard Henderson with a goal to purchase and settle a vast tract of Cherokee lands in present-day Middle Tennessee and Kentucky, and Boone later relocated his family to the Watauga Settlement sometime during the spring of 1771.

After the Battle of Alamance in 1771, many North Carolinians refused to take the new oath of allegiance to the Royal Crown and withdrew from the province. Instead of taking their new oath of allegiance, James Robertson led a group of some twelve or thirteen families involved with the Regulator movement from near where present-day Raleigh, North Carolina, now stands. In 1772, Robertson and the pioneers who had settled in Northeast Tennessee (along the Watauga River, the Doe River, the Holston River, and the Nolichucky River) met at Sycamore Shoals to establish an independent regional government known as the Watauga Association.

John Sevier, the future first governor of the State of Tennessee, first visited the Holston settlement and surrounding areas in present-day northeast Tennessee during 1771, bringing items to trade with settlers from his merchandising business in Middletown, Virginia. Sevier later returned to the area in 1772, where he witnessed a horse race at "the Watauga Old Fields, on Doe River; near its junction with the Watauga."

However, in 1772, surveyors placed the land officially within the domain of the Cherokee tribe, who required negotiation of a lease with the settlers. Tragedy struck as the lease was being celebrated, when a Cherokee warrior was murdered by a white man. James Robertson's skillful diplomacy made peace with the irate Native Americans, who threatened to expel the settlers by force if necessary.

All of present-day Tennessee was once recognized as one single North Carolina county: Washington County, North Carolina. Created in 1777 from the western areas of Burke and Wilkes counties in North Carolina, Washington County had as its precursor the Washington District of 1775–76, which was the first political entity named for the Commander-in-Chief of American forces in the Revolution.

=== American Revolutionary War ===
==== Transylvania Purchase at Sycamore Shoals ====
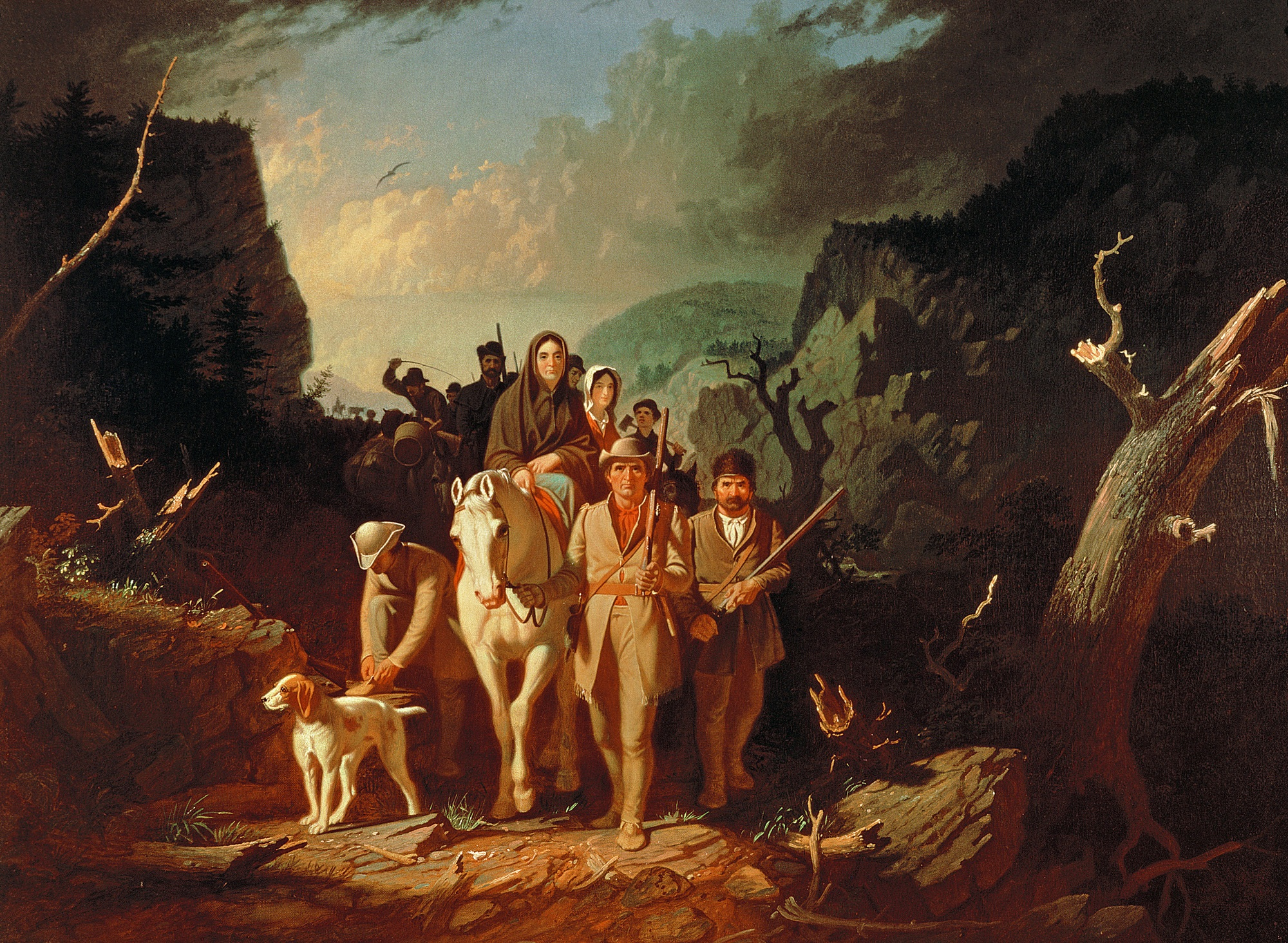
Daniel Boone Escorting Settlers through the Cumberland Gap (George Caleb Bingham, oil on canvas, 1851–52)

Elizabethton (at Sycamore Shoals) was the Fort Watauga site of the Transylvania Purchase. In March 1775, land speculator and North Carolina judge Richard Henderson met with more than 1,200 Cherokees at Sycamore Shoals, including Cherokee leaders such as Attacullaculla, Oconostota, and Dragging Canoe. In the Treaty of Sycamore Shoals (also known as the Treaty of Watauga), Henderson purchased all the land lying between the Cumberland River, the Cumberland Mountains, and the Kentucky River, and situated south of the Ohio River. The land thus delineated, 20 million acres (81,000 km^{2}), encompassed an area half as large as the present state of Kentucky. Henderson's purchase was in violation of North Carolina and Virginia law, as well as the Royal Proclamation of 1763, which prohibited private purchase of American Indian land. Henderson may have mistakenly believed that a newer British legal opinion had made such land purchases legal.

Before the Sycamore Shoals treaty, Henderson had hired Daniel Boone, an experienced hunter who had explored Kentucky, to travel to the Cherokee towns and inform them of the upcoming negotiations. Afterwards, Boone was hired to blaze what became known as the Wilderness Road, which went through the Cumberland Gap and into central Kentucky. Along with a party of about thirty workers, Boone marked a path to the Kentucky River, where he established Boonesborough (near present-day Lexington, Kentucky), which was intended to be the capital of Transylvania. Other settlements, notably Harrodsburg, were also established at this time. Many of these settlers had come to Kentucky on their own initiative, and did not recognize Transylvania's authority. A Daniel Boone Trail historical marker is found just outside the downtown Elizabethton business district.

==== July 1776 Dragging Canoe Attacks ====
Early during the American Revolutionary War, Fort Watauga at Sycamore Shoals was attacked in 1776 by Dragging Canoe and his warring faction of Cherokees opposed to the Transylvania Purchase (warring Cherokees also referred to by settlers as the Chickamauga), Cols. John Sevier and James Robertson are named as being among the defenders of the stockade fort along the Watauga River.

==== Wataugans' Settlement of Middle Tennessee ====
During the spring of 1779, James Robertson and a small group of Watauga settlers, acting upon the survey of Henderson's Transylvania Purchase, traveled west overland to select a site for a new settlement along the Cumberland River known as the French Lick (at present day Nashville). Later that same year, Robertson would return to the French Lick with a group of men to construct temporary shelters for their friends and relatives from the Watauga Settlement, who would eventually arrive at their new French Lick settlement on Christmas Day and drive their cattle across a frozen Cumberland River. A fort built by James Robertson and other settlers from the Watauga Settlement atop a bluff along the Cumberland River was named Fort Nashborough in honor of Francis Nash, who had fought alongside Robertson during the 1771 Battle of Alamance.

==== Overmountain Men Muster for the Battle of Kings Mountain ====
The Overmountain Men serving under Col. Isaac Shelby (who years earlier had worked as a surveyor for the Transylvania Company) and other patriot forces engaged and defeated a larger force of British Loyalists on August 19, 1780, at the Battle of Musgrove Mill near present-day Clinton, South Carolina. Fort Watauga later served as the September 26, 1780, staging area for a much larger contingent of some 1,100 Overmountain Men who were preparing to trek over the Blue Ridge Mountains at Roan Mountain to engage, and subsequently defeat, the British Army Loyalist forces at the Battle of Kings Mountain in rural York County, South Carolina, 9 miles (14 km) south of the present-day town of Kings Mountain, North Carolina.

Prior to the American Revolutionary War very little gunpowder had been made in the colonies, and most was imported from Britain. In October 1777, the British Parliament banned the importation of gunpowder into the American colonies. In preparation for the overmountain march, five hundred pounds of black powder was manufactured for the Overmountain Men by Mary Patton and her husband at their Gap Creek powder mill. The Overmountain Men stored the Patton black powder on the rainy first night of their march in a dry cave known as the Shelving Rock that is located near Roan Mountain State Park at present-day Roan Mountain, Tennessee. During January 1781, the Overmountain Men also fought the British at the Battle of Cowpens in South Carolina.

==== John Carter, Landon Carter, and the Carter Mansion ====
Landon Carter was the son of early Carter County settler John Carter. John Carter's circa 1780 white frame home, known as the Carter Mansion, now serves as a tourist attraction and is part of Sycamore Shoals State Park, although it is not at the park's main location. The oldest frame house in Tennessee, this former frontier plantation home is located on Broad Street Extension on the eastern side of town above the banks of the Watauga River. The property also contains a small Carter family cemetery. A landscape painting of a Virginia plantation that was discovered beneath layers of ancient paint covering the wall surface above a fireplace mantle suggests that John Carter may have been an illegitimate son of the wealthy Virginia plantation owner Robert "King" Carter and half-brother to Virginia plantation owner Landon Carter.

=== Tiptonville and the Battle of Franklin feud ===
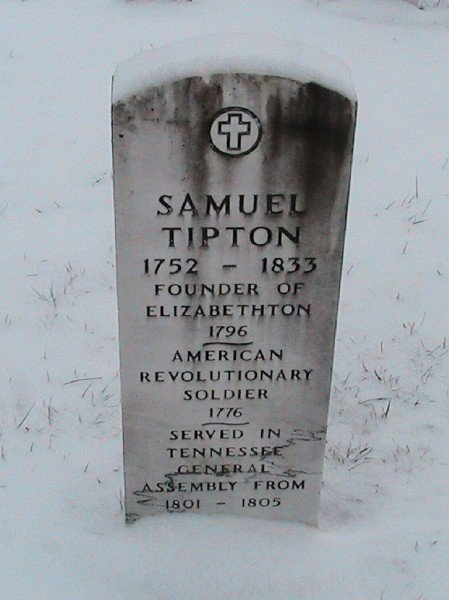
Gravestone of Samuel Tipton, "Founder of Elizabethton", located at the Green Hill Cemetery (West Mill Street). Tipton donated the land for the town that would initially be known as Tiptonville within the State of Franklin, and later as Elizabethton after Tennessee was admitted into the United States of America.

Carter County was previously named "Wayne County" while briefly within the defeated State of Franklin (along with present-day Johnson County, Tennessee, 1784–88). Samuel Tipton (1752−1833), a son of frontiersman and later State of Franklin independence opponent Colonel John Tipton, had deeded the land on which the town Tiptonville was established on the banks of the Doe River near its confluence with the Watauga River then within Wayne County.

The February 1788 Battle of Franklin was fought between those aligned with Col. John Tipton and loyal to the area remaining within the authority of the State of North Carolina and the United States and the opposition aligned with Col. John Sevier who were seeking secession from the State of North Carolina as an independent State of Franklin under Spanish rule. The Battle of Franklin took place on a farm owned by Col. John Tipton (now known as the Tipton-Haynes State Historic Site) within the southern section of present-day Johnson City, Tennessee.

Col. John Tipton would also later help to lead the effort of having Tennessee be admitted as the sixteenth state into the United States of America during 1796.

Following the 1796 admittance of the State of Tennessee into the United States of America, Wayne County was renamed named as Carter County by the losers of the Battle of Franklin in honor of Landon Carter, who served both as Chairman of the Court of the Watauga Settlement (as defined by the articles of the Watauga Petition) and as Speaker of the defunct State of Franklin Senate.

Previously named "Tiptonville" in honor of Samuel Tipton while within the State of Franklin, the town was as the county seat of the newly minted Tennessee county of Carter was, likewise, renamed as "Elizabethton" by Landon Carter and David McNabb (who were members of a state committee to officially name the area that was appointed by the Tennessee General Assembly in 1796 to locate and name the county seat of Carter County) after their wives, Elizabeth MacLin Carter and Elizabeth McNabb.

The gravesite of Samuel Tipton, "Founder of Elizabethton", is located at the Green Hill Cemetery, found on the crest of West Mill Street and overlooking northeast by north toward the historic site of Fort Caswell (this location as recorded in the unpublished John Sevier notes of Wisconsin historian Lyman C. Draper, and now more popularly known as Fort Watauga) and the Watauga River.

=== American Civil War ===
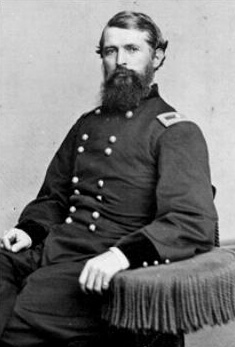
Rear Admiral/ Brevet Major General Samuel P. Carter

On the recommendation of Military Governor of Tennessee Andrew Johnson, U.S. naval officer Samuel Powhattan (S.P.) Carter was promoted to the brevet rank of brigadier general and assigned by U.S. President Abraham Lincoln to engage cavalry based in Kentucky against Confederate-held railroad lines and bridges in East Tennessee during the Civil War.

In early 1861, after receiving a letter from Carter assuring his loyalty to the Union should a civil war break out, Tennessee Governor Andrew Johnson used his influence in the United States Department of War for Carter to organize and train militia within East Tennessee. After leading successful cavalry operations at the Battle of Mill Springs on January 19, 1862, Carter accepted a commission as Brigadier General of volunteers in May and later continued leading operations at the Battle of Cumberland Gap in June as well as raids against Holston, Carter's Station, and Jonesville in December, in support of General William S. Rosecrans' attack on Murfreesboro.

Carter's younger brother, William B. Carter (1820−1902), planned and coordinated the so-called East Tennessee bridge burnings in 1861. On the night of November 8 of that year, Carter's pro-Union conspirators destroyed five railroad bridges across Confederate-occupied East Tennessee. Daniel Stover, a son-in-law of Andrew Johnson who lived near Elizabethton in the Siam community, led the party that destroyed the bridge at Union Depot (modern Bluff City). Confederate authorities placed much of East Tennessee under martial law as a result of the bridge-burning incident.

In July 1863, Carter was placed in command of the XXIII Corps cavalry division and would continue campaigning across Tennessee throughout the year. By 1865, Carter was in North Carolina and commanding the left wing of the Union forces at the Battle of Kingston. He was promoted to Brevet Major General of Volunteers, briefly commanding the XXIII Corps before being mustered out of volunteer service in January 1866.

While Carter was serving in the Union Army, the U.S. Navy promoted him to lieutenant commander in 1863, then to commander in 1865. A Tennessee Historical Marker located on West Elk Avenue in front of the S.P. Carter Mansion in downtown Elizabethton commemorates his life and naval career.

The Veterans' Monument in downtown Elizabethton was originally constructed and dedicated in 1912 to "the memory of the old soldiers of Carter County since the days of the Revolution." It is in the form of an obelisk, constructed primarily from river rock collected from the nearby Doe River, guarded by two short Civil War field cannon.

=== Railroad history ===
During the early 20th century, Elizabethton became a rail hub, served by three different railroad companies.

Beginning in the 1880s, the narrow-gauge engine known as the "Tweetsie" ran on the East Tennessee and Western North Carolina Railroad (ET&WNC) from Johnson City, passing through Elizabethton before climbing into the Blue Ridge Mountains, eventually connecting to Boone, North Carolina, in 1916.

In 1927, the 9-mile (14 km) portion of the ET&WNC railroad from Johnson City to Elizabethton was converted to standard gauge in order to more efficiently serve the NARC and Bemberg Rayon Plants.

The narrow-gauge portion of the ET&WNC ceased operations in 1950 and was subsequently abandoned, though the standard-gauge portion of the line from Johnson City to Elizabethton continued to operate until 2003 as the East Tennessee Railway. The railroad's dormant track was removed to create a new rail-to-trail, the Tweetsie Trail in 2014.

One of the ET&WNC's narrow-gauge steam locomotives (Engine #12) is still in existence, operating at the "Tweetsie Railroad" theme park at nearby Blowing Rock, North Carolina.

The Southern Railway operated a branch line into Elizabethton until the flood of 1940. It connected with the ET&WNC at a small railroad yard near the confluence of the Watauga River and the Doe River.

In the 1910s and 1920s, another small railroad, the Laurel Fork Railway, operated out of Elizabethton paralleling the ET&WNC and Doe River to Hampton, where the line split off and ran to a sawmill near present-day Watauga Lake.

=== North American Rayon Corp., American Bemberg Corp., and the 1929 Rayon Plants strikes ===
Beginning in the late 1920s, German and Dutch business investors established two major rayon manufacturing plants (Bemberg and the North American Rayon Corporation) in Elizabethton along the banks of the Watauga River, producing rayon material for both U.S. domestic and export markets.

The Rayon factories were controlled by the German-Dutch Algemene Kunstzijde Unie (AKU). During World War II the U.S. government seized managerial control of these critical rayon plants in Elizabethton. A post-war hiring apex of the Elizabethton rayon industry occurred in 1949 when over 6,100 employees were working at both of the Elizabethton rayon mills.

A specialized fiber utilized by NASA within the Space Shuttle program was manufactured at the Elizabethton plants during the 1980s, and after many years of a declining U.S. rayon market and increased foreign competition following the General Agreement on Tariffs and Trade and North American Free Trade Agreement, the remaining rayon mill (owned by the North American Rayon Corporation) closed down during the late 1990s after a fire burned down most of the factory buildings.

=== The City of Power and the Tennessee Valley Authority ===
Elizabethton was first served by relatively inexpensive hydroelectric power during the early 1910s, leading to the popular "The City of Power" moniker. The Horseshoe section of the Watauga River (within the Tennessee Valley Authority reservation behind the TVA Wilbur Dam) is the site of the first hydroelectric dam constructed in Tennessee (beginning in 1909), going online with power production and distribution in 1912.

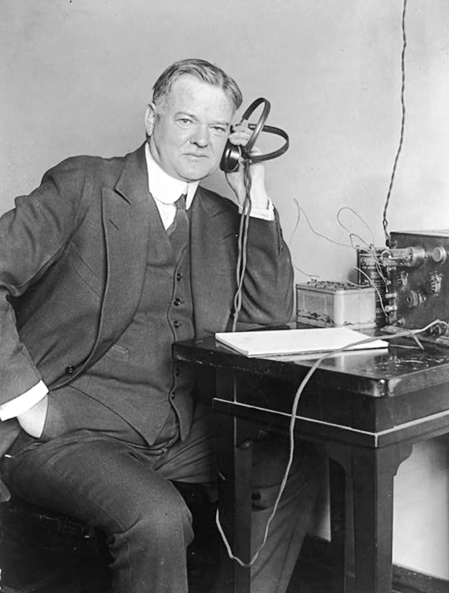
U.S. President Herbert C. Hoover

The 1928 Republican U.S. presidential candidate Herbert C. Hoover made his only southern campaign stop at Elizabethton and delivered his nationally broadcast October 6, 1928, election "stump speech" before 50,000 people gathered at the base of Lynn Mountain in Harmon Field (now at the mini-park and the Elizabethton/Carter County Chamber of Commerce building location on U.S. 321) during Elizabethton's Second Annual Industrial Celebration.

During the Elizabethton speech, Hoover "...alluded to a matter of growing concern, the status of the Federal Government's involvement in the [hydrogeneration] production of [electric] power, specifically the Muscle Shoals (Alabama) issue: "There are local instances where the Government must enter the business field as a by-product to some great major purpose such as an improvement in navigation, flood control, irrigation, scientific research or national defense."

It was the succession of Republican presidents in the White House at the time leading up to the Great Depression—first President Coolidge in 1928, followed by President Hoover later in 1931—choosing to veto the federal legislation passed by the U.S. Congress that would have created a water power development agency of the federal government.

It was U.S. Senator George W. Norris of Nebraska who sponsored the Tennessee Valley Authority Act of 1933, water power development legislation which was finally enacted during the administration of President Franklin D. Roosevelt that created the Tennessee Valley Authority. Norris was later an important proponent of the Rural Electrification Act of 1936.

Following the end of World War II, the TVA Watauga Dam and Reservoir were completed 3 miles (5 km) upstream of the Wilbur Dam in 1948.

The TVA Wilbur Dam has four hydroelectric generating turbines with a production capacity of 10,700 kilowatts of electricity while the TVA Watauga hydroelectric facility upstream has two generating units with a net dependable capacity (the amount of power a hydrogenerating impounded reservoir can produce on an average day, minus the electricity used by the dam itself) of 66 megawatts.

=== U.S. Bicentennial – Overmountain Victory Trail ===
Hikers, military reenactors, and scouts have followed segments of the famous Overmountain Victory Trail, and in 1975, three Elizabethton Boy Scouts were among those who completed the re-enactment of the overmountain route (approximately 214 miles (344 km) in one direction) by hiking from Elizabethton at Sycamore Shoals to the Kings Mountain National Military Park.

Liberty: The Saga of Sycamore Shoals (formerly known as The Wataugans) is the official outdoor historical drama of the state of Tennessee. It is presented by the Watauga Historical Association and the Sycamore Shoals Historic Area in Elizabethton every July on the last three Thursday–Friday–Saturday weekends of the month. Employing a mixed cast of volunteer professional and amateur local actors and re-enactors engaged through an open casting call, Liberty: The Saga of Sycamore Shoals depicts the early history of the area that is now Northeast Tennessee.

Based on a bill introduced by North Carolina Congressman James T. Broyhill before the final NPS report was issued, Congress passed an amendment to Section 5(a) of the National Trails System Act to establish the Overmountain Victory National Historic Trail. U.S. President Jimmy Carter, recognizing the historical significance of the frontier patriots marching over the Appalachian Mountains to fight the British Loyalists at the Battle of King's Mountain, signed the bill (P.L. 96 344) into law on September 8, 1980, designating the historical overmountain route as the Overmountain Victory National Historic Trail, the first National Historic Trail established within the eastern United States.

=== Elizabethton Airport Plane Incident ===
On June 4, 2023, a plane that took off from the Elizabethton airport was the cause of an airspace emergency over Washington, DC, after the pilot lost consciousness and the plane flew into restricted airspace. The plane crashed in the St Mary's Wilderness in Virginia. The four aboard, including the pilot, were killed.

== Geography ==
=== Northeast Tennessee location ===
Elizabethton is located within the "Tri-Cities" area (encompassed by Bristol, Johnson City, and Kingsport) of northeast Tennessee.

Time offset from Coordinated Universal Time (UTC): UTC-5 (Eastern Time).

According to the United States Census Bureau, the city has a total area of 9.9 square miles (25.6 km^{2}), of which 9.7 square miles (25.2 km^{2}) is land and 0.2 square miles (0.4 km^{2}), or 1.62%, is water.

The elevation at Elizabethton Municipal Airport is 1,593 feet (486 m) ASL (the highest point of elevation in Carter County is at Roan Mountain with an elevation of 6,285 feet (1,916 m) ASL), and the airport is located on the eastern side of the city along State Highway 91 Stoney Creek Exit. Elizabethton is also connected to larger commercial, shuttle, and cargo flights out of Tri-Cities Regional Airport northwest of Johnson City.

Lynn Mountain reaches 2,060 feet (630 m) ASL at the summit (36.350°N, 82.191°W) and is located directly across the U.S. Highway 19E from the downtown Elizabethton business district.

Elizabethton is bordered on the west by Johnson City.

=== Water resources and renewable energy ===
==== Spring Water ====
While most of the Tennessee public water-supply systems withdrawing spring water for their supplies are found in East Tennessee, the Elizabethton municipal water system during 2010 extracted and distributed 5.39 Mgal/d of clean spring water from three springs owned by the city --- a unique local supply of flowing spring water that greatly exceeds the volume of spring water extracted and distributed than any other local water resource system across the entire state of Tennessee.

==== Doe River ====
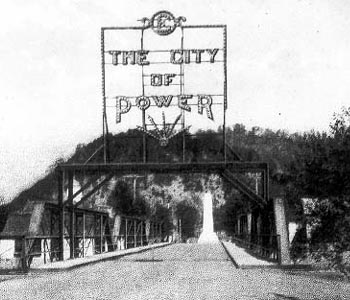
"The City of Power" electric sign that was erected over the old Elk Avenue Bridge (circa 1912–1913).

The Doe River forms in Carter County, Tennessee, near the North Carolina line, just south of Roan Mountain State Park. The river initially flows north and is first paralleled by State Route 143; at the community of Roan Mountain, Tennessee, it then turns west and is at this point paralleled by U.S. Route 19E. The Doe River flows to the east of Fork Mountain; the Little Doe River flows by Fork Mountain to the west.

Below the confluence of the Doe River and the Little Doe River at Hampton, the Doe River then travels roughly in a northern downstream direction through the Valley Forge community, and is rejoined by U.S. Route 19E. Pushing through a mountain gap just north of Hampton, the volume of the river is amplified by the waters flowing from McCathern Spring.

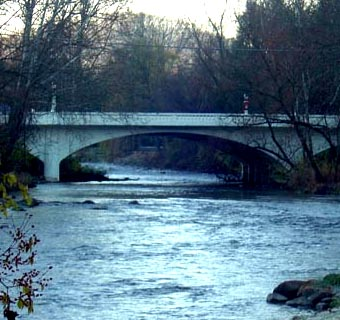
Broad Street Bridge

Further downstream, the Doe River flows by the East Side neighborhood parallel with Tennessee State Route 67 and then underneath the historic Elizabethton Covered Bridge, built in 1882 and located within the Elizabethton downtown business district. Connecting 3rd Street and Hattie Avenue, the covered bridge is adjacent to a city park and spans the Doe River. The covered bridge, although now closed to motor traffic, is still open for bicycles and pedestrians.

Most of Elizabethton's downtown is listed on the National Register of Historic Places for its historical and architectural merits. The Elizabethton Historic District contains a variety of properties ranging in age from the late 18th century through the 1930s. The Elizabethton Covered Bridge is an important focal point and a well-known landmark in the state. In addition to the covered bridge, the downtown historic district contains the 1928 Elk Avenue concrete arch bridge, and just a little further downstream on the Doe River, Tennessee State Route 67 passes another similar concrete arch bridge locally known as the Broad Street Bridge. The bridge was declared structurally unsafe after being damaged by Hurricane Helene and took nine months to repair following this due to the construction crews wanting to keep the historic look.

Elizabethton celebrates in the downtown business area for one week each June with the Elizabethton Covered Bridge Days featuring country and gospel music performances, activities for children, Elk Avenue car club show, and many food and crafts vendors.

==== Watauga River ====
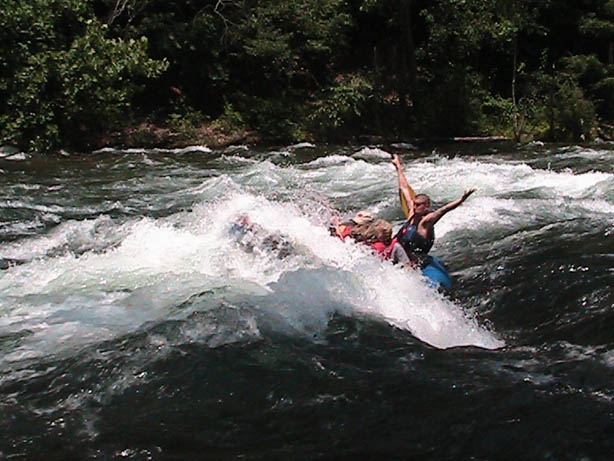
Raft guide plunging whitewater rafters downstream through "The Big Hole" in the Bee Cliff Rapids

Two Tennessee Valley Authority (TVA) reservoirs in Carter County—impounded behind the Watauga Dam (forming Watauga Lake) and the immediately downstream Wilbur Dam—are located southeast and upstream of Elizabethton on the Watauga River. The Appalachian Trail crosses the Watauga River and the TVA reservation in Carter County to the southeast of Elizabethton.

The Watauga River flows westward past Elizabethton, which lies on the south bank of the Watauga and along either side of its principal tributary, the Doe River. The downtown business district is located approximately one-quarter mile upstream of the confluence of the Doe River and the Watauga River. The Doe River flows underneath the historic wooden covered bridge that is located within the Elizabethton downtown business district.

The city of Elizabethton was at one time promoted as "The City of Power", as the town is located just southeast of the Wilbur Dam hydrogeneration site spanning the Watauga River. Construction of Wilbur Dam first began during 1909, and two hydroelectric generating units were online with power production at Wilbur Dam when it was completed in 1912. A third generating unit was added to Wilbur Dam in 1926, and a fourth hydrogeneration unit was added to Wilbur Dam after the Tennessee Valley Authority acquired the power production facility in 1945.

The Bee Cliff Rapids—a popular summer destination on the Watauga River for whitewater rafters during the summer months—are located southeast of Elizabethton and downstream of the TVA Wilbur Dam.

The Watauga River downstream of the western side of Elizabethton has one of the only two sections of trophy trout streams in Tennessee.

=== Holston Mountain communication towers ===
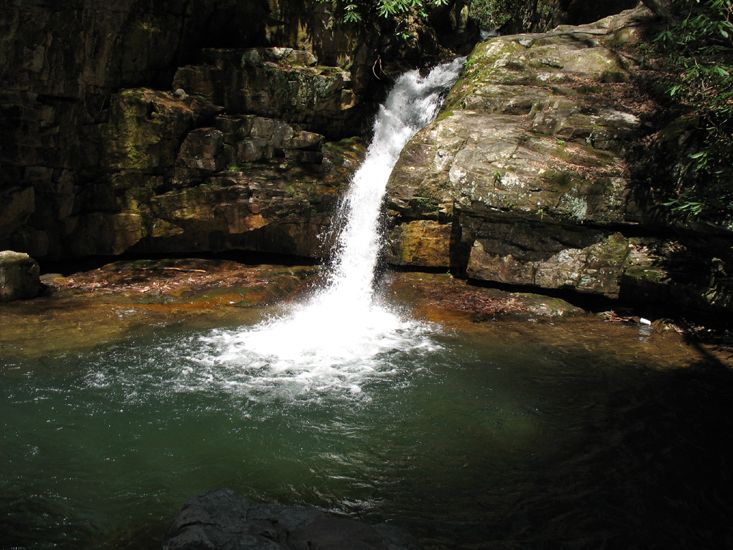
The main waterfall at Blue Hole Falls northeast of Elizabethton on Holston Mountain

Elizabethton lies within a river valley basin mostly surrounded by mountain ridges and significant hills, such as Holston Mountain, the southern end of which lies just to the northeast. Panhandle Road is located off State Highway 91 in Carter County and ascends Holston Mountain for 3 miles (5 km) from the eastern side and ends 4 miles (6 km) along the ridge southwest of Holston High Point. During periods of heavy snow and ice, the National Forest Service closes Panhandle Road.

Located near the Cherokee National Forest boundary and to the left of Panhandle Road is a parking area and foot trail that leads down the slope to the Blue Hole Falls (approximately 45 feet (14 m) high). The last 3 miles (5 km) of Panhandle Road are filled with washouts, steep drop-offs, and no turnarounds. Vehicle travel on this last section is at the driver's risk.

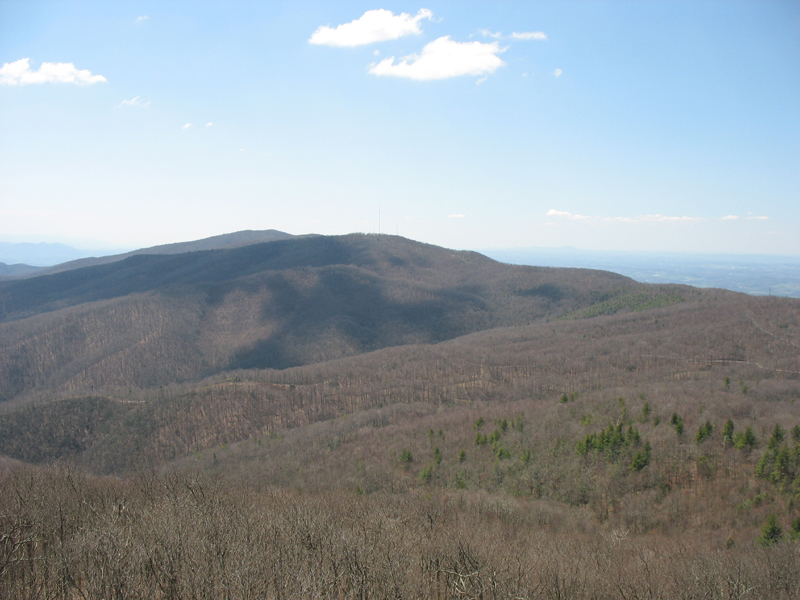
Holston High Point as seen from Holston High Knob

Early broadcasters in the 1950s and 1960s quickly realized Holston Mountain would be a prime radio-television transmission location because it is the highest visible point that faces most of the major cities in Northeast Tennessee. As a result, the Holston Mountain ridge is the transmitter site for three television stations in the Tri-Cities, Tennessee Television Designated Market Area. The broadcasting antenna for WCYB-TV, Channel 5, Bristol, Virginia, is on Rye Patch Knob, with the top of the antenna 341 feet (104 m) above ground, 2,431 feet (741 m) above the surrounding valley floor, and 4,533 feet (1,382 m) above sea level. The single tower the antenna sits on is the highest and tallest man-made structure on the mountain. The television towers for WJHL-TV, Channel 11, Johnson City, and WKPT-TV, Channel 19, Kingsport, are standing side by side in a common broadcasting antenna farm on the southwest slope of Holston High Point, 1 mile (1.6 km) southwest of Rye Patch Knob. The antenna for WJHL-TV stands 200 feet (61 m) above ground, 2,319 feet (707 m) above the surrounding valley floor, and 4,370 feet (1,330 m) above sea level. The antenna for WKPT-TV next door stands 193 feet (59 m) above ground, also 2,319 feet (707 m) above the valley floor, and 4,366 feet (1,331 m) above sea level. The stations' digital antennas are also on their respective towers.

Holston Mountain is also the transmitting site for three FM Class C radio stations: WTFM-FM 98.5, Kingsport, Tennessee; WXBQ-FM 96.9, Bristol, Virginia, and WETS-FM 89.5, Johnson City, Tennessee. All three antennas and the backup antennas are located at the antenna farm on the southwest slope of Holston High Point. Also located on the ridge are the antenna for one FM Class C1 radio station, WHCB-FM 91.5, Bristol, Tennessee, located at Rye Patch Knob; one FM Class C2 antenna for radio station WCQR-FM 88.3, Kingsport, Tennessee, and one FM Class D antenna for radio station W214AP-FM 90.7, Johnson City, Tennessee, both transmitting from the antenna farm on the southwest slope of Holston High Point. Various U.S. federal, Tennessee state, Sullivan, Washington and Carter County governmental agencies, along with utility microwave relay stations, also transmit base-to-mobile communications from the Holston High Point antenna farm and Rye Patch Knob.

The Federal Aviation Administration maintains a navigational beacon at the Holston Mountain summit.

East Tennessee PBS (or "ETPtv"), while not having a television repeater station serving the immediate area, broadcasts programming on two different over-the-air digital channels that can be received and viewed at higher hilltop elevations in Elizabethton. In early 2009, ETPtv became one of the first stations in East Tennessee to broadcast a digital high definition signal 24 hours a day.

=== Climate ===
Climate data for Elizabethton, Tennessee (1991–2020 normals, extremes 1895–present)
Month	Jan	Feb	Mar	Apr	May	Jun	Jul	Aug	Sep	Oct	Nov	Dec	Year
Record high °F (°C)	78 (26)	82 (28)	84 (29)	93 (34)	97 (36)	102 (39)	105 (41)	99 (37)	98 (37)	92 (33)	87 (31)	80 (27)	105 (41)
Mean daily maximum °F (°C)	46.2 (7.9)	50.4 (10.2)	58.9 (14.9)	69.0 (20.6)	76.6 (24.8)	82.9 (28.3)	85.5 (29.7)	85.0 (29.4)	80.1 (26.7)	70.0 (21.1)	58.5 (14.7)	49.5 (9.7)	67.7 (19.8)
Daily mean °F (°C)	35.9 (2.2)	39.2 (4.0)	46.6 (8.1)	55.5 (13.1)	64.2 (17.9)	71.2 (21.8)	74.5 (23.6)	73.7 (23.2)	67.9 (19.9)	57.0 (13.9)	45.9 (7.7)	39.2 (4.0)	55.9 (13.3)
Mean daily minimum °F (°C)	25.5 (−3.6)	28.1 (−2.2)	34.2 (1.2)	41.9 (5.5)	51.8 (11.0)	59.6 (15.3)	63.5 (17.5)	62.3 (16.8)	55.6 (13.1)	44.0 (6.7)	33.3 (0.7)	28.8 (−1.8)	44.1 (6.7)
Record low °F (°C)	−21 (−29)	−17 (−27)	−2 (−19)	20 (−7)	28 (−2)	39 (4)	46 (8)	43 (6)	31 (−1)	22 (−6)	10 (−12)	−12 (−24)	−21 (−29)
Average precipitation inches (mm)	3.78 (96)	3.76 (96)	3.97 (101)	3.81 (97)	4.43 (113)	5.16 (131)	5.86 (149)	4.20 (107)	3.00 (76)	2.80 (71)	3.36 (85)	3.90 (99)	48.03 (1,220)
Average snowfall inches (cm)	1.9 (4.8)	2.1 (5.3)	0.1 (0.25)	0.0 (0.0)	0.0 (0.0)	0.0 (0.0)	0.0 (0.0)	0.0 (0.0)	0.0 (0.0)	0.0 (0.0)	0.1 (0.25)	1.8 (4.6)	6.0 (15)
Average precipitation days (≥ 0.01 in)	12.5	12.2	13.1	11.9	12.7	13.4	13.5	11.6	9.0	8.9	10.2	12.8	141.8
Average snowy days (≥ 0.1 in)	1.2	1.2	0.4	0.0	0.0	0.0	0.0	0.0	0.0	0.0	0.3	1.2	4.3
Source: NOAA

=== Connection with Interstate Highway System ===
The closest Interstate Highway is I-26 in Johnson City. To reach Elizabethton, drivers take Exit 24 and head east 8 miles (13 km) on U.S. Route 321 and Tennessee State Route 67.

== Demographics ==
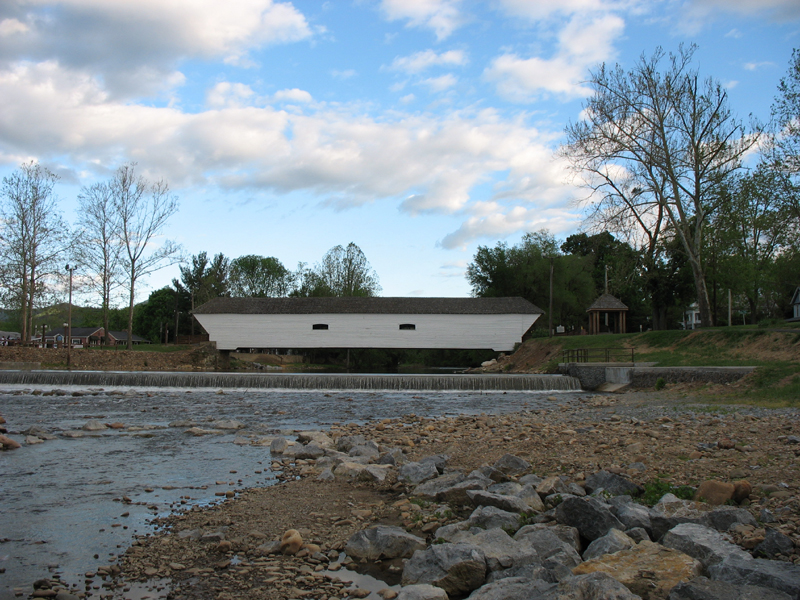
The 1882 completion of the Elizabethton Covered Bridge, spanning 154 feet (47 m) across the Doe River, soon led to the early local descriptions of "Old Town" (east with Main Street and the courthouse) and "New Town" (west of the Doe River) sections in Elizabethton.

Historical population
Census	Pop.	Note	%±
1850	373		—
1860	360		−3.5%
1870	321		−10.8%
1880	362		12.8%
1890	734		102.8%
1910	2,478		—
1920	2,749		10.9%
1930	8,093		194.4%
1940	8,516		5.2%
1950	10,754		26.3%
1960	10,896		1.3%
1970	12,269		12.6%
1980	12,431		1.3%
1990	11,931		−4.0%
2000	13,372		12.1%
2010	14,176		6.0%
2020	14,546		2.6%
2025 (est.)	14,350	▼	−1.3%

=== 2020 census ===
As of the 2020 census, Elizabethton had a population of 14,546, 6,001 households, and 3,301 families; the median age was 40.7 years, 19.1% of residents were under 18, 21.6% were 65 or older, and for every 100 females there were 86.1 males (83.4 per 100 females age 18 and over).

100.0% of residents lived in urban areas, while 0.0% lived in rural areas.

There were 6,001 households in Elizabethton, of which 26.7% had children under the age of 18 living in them, 37.4% were married-couple households, 19.5% were households with a male householder and no spouse or partner present, and 36.6% were households with a female householder and no spouse or partner present; 35.9% of households consisted of individuals and 17.0% had someone living alone who was 65 years of age or older.

There were 6,659 housing units, of which 9.9% were vacant. The homeowner vacancy rate was 2.6% and the rental vacancy rate was 4.8%.

Racial composition as of the 2020 census
Race	Number	Percent
White	13,184	90.6%
Black or African American	367	2.5%
American Indian and Alaska Native	39	0.3%
Asian	101	0.7%
Native Hawaiian and Other Pacific Islander	2	0.0%
Some other race	149	1.0%
Two or more races	704	4.8%
Hispanic or Latino (of any race)	392	2.7%

=== 2000 census ===
As of the census of 2000, there was a population of 13,372, with 5,454 households and 3,512 families residing in the city. The population density was 1,459.3 people per square mile (563.4 people/km^{2}). There were 5,964 housing units at an average density of 650.9 per square mile (251.3/km^{2}). The racial makeup of the city was 95.30% White, 2.47% African American, 0.16% Native American, 0.55% Asian, 0.01% Pacific Islander, 0.49% from other races, and 1.02% from two or more races. Hispanic or Latino of any race were 1.18% of the population.

There were 5,454 households, out of which 26.6% had children under the age of 18 living with them, 46.6% were married couples living together, 14.7% had a female householder with no husband present, and 35.6% were non-families. 32.6% of all households were made up of individuals, and 16.5% had someone living alone who was 65 years of age or older. The average household size was 2.24 and the average family size was 2.82.

In the city, the population was spread out, with 20.5% under the age of 18, 10.8% from 18 to 24, 24.5% from 25 to 44, 23.1% from 45 to 64, and 21.0% who were 65 years of age or older. The median age was 40 years. For every 100 females, there were 82.3 males. For every 100 females age 18 and over, there were 76.8 males.

The median income for a household in the city was $25,909, and the median income for a family was $33,333. Males had a median income of $26,890 versus $20,190 for females. The per capita income for the city was $14,578. About 15.2% of families and 19.4% of the population were below the poverty line, including 29.8% of those under age 18 and 16.1% of those age 65 or over.

== Education ==
=== Colleges ===
Satellite campuses of Northeast State Community College and Tennessee College of Applied Technology are located in the eastern part of the city.

Milligan University and Emmanuel Christian Seminary are located in the southwestern part of the city.

=== K–12 ===
Public schools in Elizabethton are operated by Elizabethton City Schools.

- Elizabethton High School
- T.A. Dugger Jr. High School
- East Side Elementary School
- Harold McCormick Elementary School
- West Side Elementary School

== Recreation ==
Sycamore Shoals State Historic Area is located in the city and consists of three separate areas; the main and Sabine Hill portions on the west side of the city and Elizabethton in the east side of the city.

The City of Elizabethton Parks and Recreation Department manages:

- Harmon Park – 1.9 acres
- Cat Island Park – 12.5 acres
- Covered Bridge Park – 2.25 acres
- Edward's Island Park – 3.2 acres
- Walter Curtis Memorial Park – 1.6 acres
- Douglas Park – 3.7 acres
- Carmen Dugger Sports Complex – 9.8 acres
- Kiwanis Park – 3.1 acres
- Riverside Park – 6.8 acres
- Lions Field – 12 acres
- Race Street Park – 1.3 acres
- Mill Race Park – 0.5 acres
- Dixon Street Park – 1.4 acres
- Elizabethton Linear Path (Greenway) – 6 miles long

== Tweetsie Trail ==
The Tweetsie Trail is a rails-to-trails project traversing former ET&WNC railroad right-of-way between Johnson City and Elizabethton that provides opportunities for walking, hiking, running, biking, and eBiking over a relatively minor grades, including a mostly natural setting found between the bridges over Buffalo Creek in western Elizabethton and the Legion Street trailhead in Johnson City.

The cost of constructing the newly resurfaced, 10-mile compacted crushed stone gravel Tweetsie Trail rails-to-trails project was financed with private and local government contributions.

Section I between Johnson City and Sycamore Shoals State Park in Elizabethton was completed in the summer of 2014 and opened on August 30 with the inaugural Tweetsie Trail Trek.

Section II of the trail begins at Sycamore Shoals State Park, proceeds to downtown Elizabethton and continues to the end of the line, near the Betsytowne Shopping Center. Section II opened during August 2015, making a total length of 10 miles. The Carter County Commission has discussed plans to further extend the trail into Roan Mountain, Tennessee, which is scheduled for completion in 2025.

== Sports ==
Several Minor League Baseball teams have been based in Elizabethton. Professional baseball was first played in the city by the Elizabethton Betsy Red Sox in the Appalachian League in 1937. They remained in the league through 1942 and won the Appalachian League championship in 1939 and 1941. Subsequent entries in the league were the Elizabethton Betsy Cubs (1945–1948), Elizabethton Betsy Local (1949–1950), Elizabethton Phils (1951), and Elizabethton Twins (1974–2020). The Twins won the league championship 12 times, more than any other team in the circuit's history. In conjunction with a contraction of Minor League Baseball beginning with the 2021 season, the Appalachian League was reorganized as a collegiate summer baseball league, and the Twins were replaced by the Elizabethton River Riders, a new franchise in the revamped league designed for rising college freshman and sophomores.

== Notable people ==
- Paul Edward Anderson – Olympic gold medalist in weightlifting
- Margaret Bowen – led the March 12, 1929, walkout of 523 female co-workers at American Glanzstoff, beginning the 1929 labor strikes
- William Gannaway Brownlow – governor of Tennessee, U.S. senator, Methodist minister, and publisher of the Whig newspaper
- Evan Carter – Major League Baseball outfielder, 2023 World Series Winner with the Texas Rangers
- Samuel P. Carter – U.S. Army general and U.S. Navy admiral
- Charles Davis – University of Tennessee football player and Fox Sports analyst
- Landon Carter Haynes – Speaker of the Tennessee House of Representatives, Confederate senator, lawyer, Methodist minister, and editor of the Tennessee Sentinel
- Frank Knight – University of Chicago economist, cofounder of the Chicago School of Economics, alumnus of Elizabethton's Milligan College
- Alec McLean – Olympic rower
- Thomas Amos Rogers Nelson – early Elizabethton attorney and member of the U.S. House of Representatives.
- Dayton E. Phillips – jurist and member of the U.S. House of Representatives
- Jeff Reed – Major League Baseball catcher
- Joseph Marcus Ritchie – organist, composer, and conductor
- Alfred A. Taylor – governor of Tennessee and congressman
- Robert Love Taylor – governor of Tennessee and U.S. senator from Tennessee
- Kent Williams – Speaker of the Tennessee House of Representatives
- Jason Witten – National Football League tight end

== See also ==
=== Places ===
- Appalachian Development Highway System
- Corridor B
- Iron Mountains
- Joe O'Brien Field
- Tennessee's 1st congressional district
- Tri-Cities, Tennessee

=== People ===
- William Blount
- Daniel Ellis (Unionist)
- Nathaniel Edwin Harris
- Daniel Morgan
- John Sevier
- Nancy Ward
- Jason Witten
- Evan Carter

=== Events ===
- Treaty of Dumplin Creek (1785-1786; State of Franklin negotiated this treaty with the Cherokees - not recognized by the State of North Carolina.)
- Treaty of Hopewell (1785-1786)
- Treaty of Holston (1791)
- Cherokee–American wars
- Textile workers strike (1934)

=== Other ===
- Scottish Indian trade
