= Liberty! The Saga of Sycamore Shoals =

Liberty! The Saga of Sycamore Shoals, formerly known as The Wataugans, is an outdoor historical drama that takes place in Elizabethton, Tennessee, at the Sycamore Shoals Historic Area. Designated the official outdoor drama of the state of Tennessee, it is presented by the Friends of Sycamore Shoals every June each night of the first four weekends (Fri-Sat the first two weeks and Thurs-Sat the second two weeks). Employing a mixed cast of volunteering professional and amateur local actors and re-enactors engaged through an open casting call, Liberty depicts the early history of the area that is now northeast Tennessee.

== Plot ==
=== Act I ===
The early settlers along the Holston and Watauga Rivers in modern East Tennessee find themselves outside the jurisdiction of North Carolina and Virginia, and, in 1772, form a government of their own, the Watauga Association, described by such historians as Theodore Roosevelt as the first free and independent government (at least by men of European descent) on the American continent. At the time, it was regarded by John Murray, 4th Earl of Dunmore, royal governor of Virginia, as an attempt to set up a 'Separate State,' which made it 'a dangerous example' to other disaffected colonists.

In 1775, Judge Richard Henderson's Transylvania Purchase, buying most of modern Kentucky and Middle Tennessee from the Cherokee Indians is opposed by the young warrior Dragging Canoe. He and his followers also oppose the purchase by the Watauga Association of the land they currently occupy. Although most of the older chiefs, including Dragging Canoe's father Atta-culla-culla, favour peace with the white settlers, the younger warriors attack the settlements in the area, bringing the act to a climax with the 1776 attack on the reproduction of Fort Watauga (more properly known as Fort Caswell) that has stood in the park since the 1970s. In the battle, John Sevier, who would later be the only governor of the State of Franklin and the first governor of the State of Tennessee, meets his second wife, the high-spirited and athletic Catherine Sherrill, pulling her over the wall of the fort after her running leap made while fleeing from the Cherokees.

Act I concludes with the breaking of the siege and news of the Declaration of Independence.

=== Act II ===
The 1780 wedding of John Sevier and 'Bonnie Kate' Sherrill is interrupted by a messenger with news of the war being fought against the British on the other side of the Appalachian Mountains. Major Patrick Ferguson, a British officer assigned to lead American Loyalist Militia in pacifying the rebellion in the west, has threatened to march over the mountains, hang the leaders, and lay waste to the country with fire and sword. Local leaders attending the wedding agree to muster the local militia on September 25, 1780, and march over the mountains to meet Ferguson before he can endanger their families. The ensuing march, culminating in the Battle of Kings Mountain, earned the participants the nickname "Overmountain Men," and their victory over the British is sometimes referred to as the turning point of the American Revolution in the South.

The drama depicts the battle in the distance on a small hill beside the fort that serves as a backdrop for the entire performance. The distant battle is accompanied by narration and exciting (yet loud) fireworks and gunfire.

During the absence of the militia, the women of the settlement and the few remaining men (one out of seven were drafted to stay behind) defend themselves from the Cherokee and British Indian agents.

The drama concludes with the return of the Overmountain Men and a brief narration of the later accomplishments of some of their more prominent members, like Landon Carter.

== History ==
Due to legal problems, "The Wataugans" was rewritten, and obtained a new name. After the change, the drama was performed in Nashville for one weekend.

For its twenty ninth Season, 2007, the title "The Wataugans" was changed to "Liberty! The Saga of Sycamore Shoals." The Watauga Historical Association is no longer in existence, replaced as the primary backer for the play by the Friends of Sycamore Shoals State Historic Park.

"Liberty!" was made Tennessee's official outdoor drama by the Tennessee General Assembly in 2009.
