= Fort Watauga =

Fortification near Elizabethton, Tennessee, U.S.

Coordinates: 36.34413°N 82.25421°W

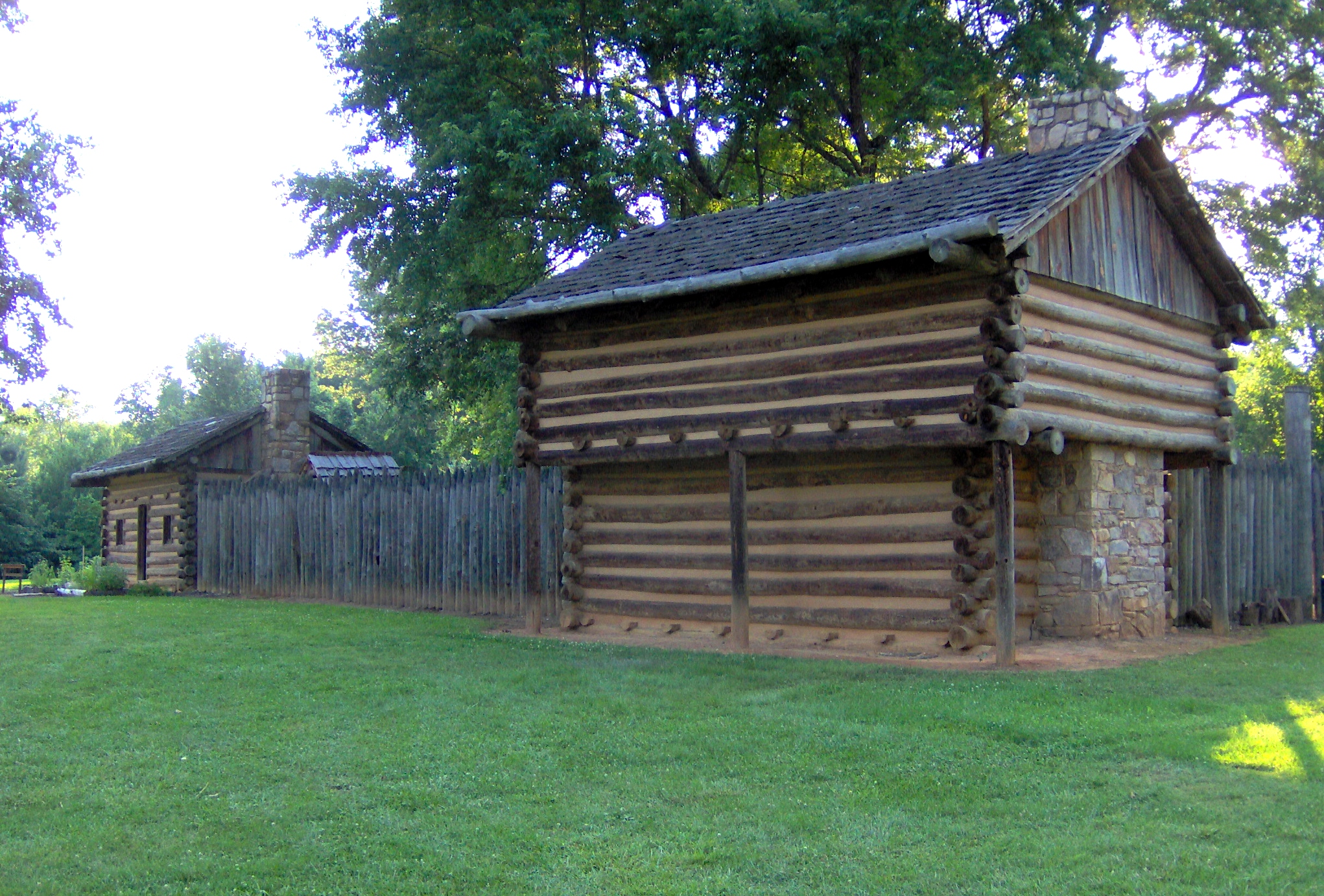
The reconstructed Fort Watauga at Sycamore Shoals State Historic Park.

Fort Watauga, also known as Fort Caswell, was a fortification located in the Watauga River's Sycamore Shoals near modern-day Elizabethton, Tennessee. It was constructed from 1775 to 1776 by the Watauga Association, a semi-autonomous government founded by American settlers living near the river, to defend the settlers against attacks from British-allied Indians. The fort was originally named Fort Caswell after the governor of North Carolina, Richard Caswell.

In the 1970s, as part of the United States Bicentennial celebrations, the government of Tennessee authorized a reconstruction of Fort Watauga. A group of archaeologists conducted excavations in the Sycamore Shoals area and uncovered several trenches believed to have been part of the fort's walls. The fort was then rebuilt based on information gained about the fort's design from the excavation, descriptions of the fort in historical sources, and the general design of typical Appalachian frontier forts. The reconstructed fort is now part of Sycamore Shoals State Historic Park.

== History ==
=== Watauga settlement ===
During the late 1760s, Anglo-American colonists began establishing settlements in the Holston, Watauga and Nolichucky river valleys in the southwestern region of the British colony of Virginia. Along the Watauga River, white settlers were drawn to the Watauga Old Fields, an ancient Indian gathering place. The Watauga Old Fields consisted of flat, cleared land located along the Sycamore Shoals, a relatively low stretch of the Watauga River where colonists and explorers could cross with ease. The settlers quickly came into conflict with the Cherokee and other Indian tribes which had traditionally used the region as a hunting ground and resisted American invasion with force.

The Royal Proclamation of 1763 and several subsequent treaties placed the boundary of British-controlled territory at the southern fork of the Holston River, and in the early 1770s, Anglo-American settlers outside this boundary were ordered by the Crown to leave. Though the settlers leased their lands from Cherokee chiefs in 1772 and purchased them in 1775, they were still ordered to leave as these agreements violated the 1763 proclamation. In addition, a Cherokee faction led by the young chief Dragging Canoe vehemently opposed the sale of tribal lands to the colonists, and threatened to attack any American settler in the region. In 1774 and 1775, both British Indian Department official John Stuart and governor of North Carolina Josiah Martin issued repeated calls for settlers south of the Holston to leave.

=== July 1776 Cherokee invasion ===
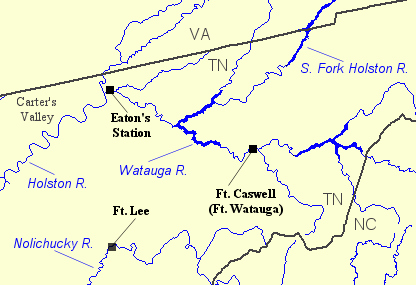
Major locations during the Cherokee attack of 1776 (modern state boundaries shown for reference)

The outbreak of the American Revolutionary War in 1775 further agitated the tense situation on the Appalachian frontier. Settlers along with Watauga and Nolichucky river generally supported the Patriot cause, and formed a committee of safety along with founding the Washington District. In January 1776, Dragging Canoe and the British forged an alliance, and in April of that year British agents supplied the Cherokee with a large cache of weapons to use in attacks against American colonists. Now well-armed, the Cherokee sent a message to settlers along the Watauga River, giving them twenty days to leave Cherokee lands or face attack.

The settlers, meanwhile, had been anticipating a Cherokee attack. They undertook various preparatory measures, which included buying weapons and ammunition via the Fincastle County, Virginia committee of safety, gathering foodstuffs and medicine, and constructing and strengthening various fortifications in the region. One of these forts was Fort Caswell, named after the governor of North Carolina, Richard Caswell. In early July 1775, Cherokee woman Nancy Ward tipped off the Cherokee attack plans to American trader Isaac Thomas, who proceeded to deliver the news to John Sevier, who was at the Nolichucky settlement (near modern Limestone) overseeing the construction of Fort Lee. The news alarmed the settlers, and most of them fled to Fort Caswell, forcing Sevier to flee likewise and abandon Fort Lee's completion.

The Cherokee invasion began in mid-July, 1776. When the invaders reached the Nolichucky, a contingent led by a chief known as "The Raven" split off toward Carter's Valley (near modern Kingsport), where he chased away the settlers and burned their cabins and farms. Two contingents led by Dragging Canoe and Old Abraham of Chilhowee (or Abram) proceeded up the Nolichucky where they burned the abandoned Fort Lee. This force then split up, with Dragging Canoe marching north to attack the Holston settlements and Old Abraham marching east to attack Fort Watauga. As Dragging Canoe approached Eaton's Station (in the vicinity of Long Island of the Holston), the fort's garrison, led by Captain John Thompson, feared the Cherokees would bypass the fort and destroy their farms, and thus marched out to engage them at Island Flats. 13 Cherokee were killed and dozens (including Dragging Canoe) were wounded, and the Cherokee force retreated.

=== The siege of Fort Caswell ===
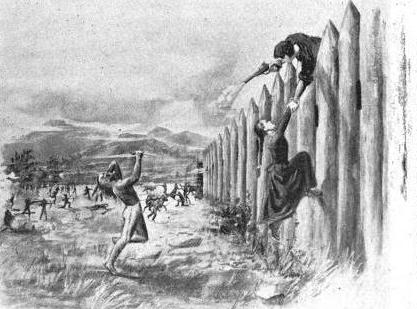
Depiction of the Cherokee assault on Fort Watauga in July 1776. Future Tennessee governor John Sevier is shown pulling his future wife, Catherine "Bonny Kate" Sherrill, over the fort's palisades.

With the Cherokee approaching, some 150 to 200 settlers crowded into Fort Caswell. The fort's garrison consisted of roughly 75 men under the command of John Carter (the Committee of Safety commissioner), with James Robertson and John Sevier as subordinates. Old Abraham of Chilhowee's contingent of Cherokee warriors arrived at Fort Caswell in the early morning hours of July 21. The sudden appearance of the invaders surprised several women out milking cows, forcing them to rush to get back inside the fort. One of them, Catherine "Bonnie Kate" Sherrill, the future wife of John Sevier, was unable to get back inside before the gate was locked and had to be pulled over the palisades by Sevier. The initial Cherokee attack lasted about three hours, with both sides exchanging gunfire. During the attack, several Cherokees managed to get close enough to the fort to attempt to set it on fire, but were forced back after Ann Robertson Johnson (sister of James Robertson) threw scalding hot water at them.

Unable to take the fort, the Cherokee halted the assault and settled in for a lengthy siege. In the ensuing days, a teenager named Tom Moore was captured outside the fort and taken to Tuskegee, where he was burned at the stake. Another captive, Lydia Russell Bean, wife of early settler William Bean, was about to meet the same fate when Nancy Ward intervened and used her authority as a Beloved Woman to spare her. After approximately two weeks, the Cherokee lifted the siege and retreated. The arrival of the Virginia militia under William Christian later that year largely ended the threat to the fort.

=== The fort in later years ===
In September 1780, the Overmountain Men— the frontier militia that helped defeat an army of British loyalists at the Battle of Kings Mountain— mustered at Sycamore Shoals on the grounds around Fort Watauga. After this event, the fort largely vanished from historical records, but it still occasionally appeared in land deeds as late as 1819.

In 1909, the Daughters of the American Revolution placed a monument near the site of the fort. In the mid-1970s, the state of Tennessee reconstructed the fort in anticipation of the nation's 1976 bicentennial celebrations. The state funded archaeological excavations and historical research to determine the fort's design and location. The Watauga Historical Association, formed in the late 1950s, was instrumental in the creation of Sycamore Shoals State Historic Park.

== Location and design ==
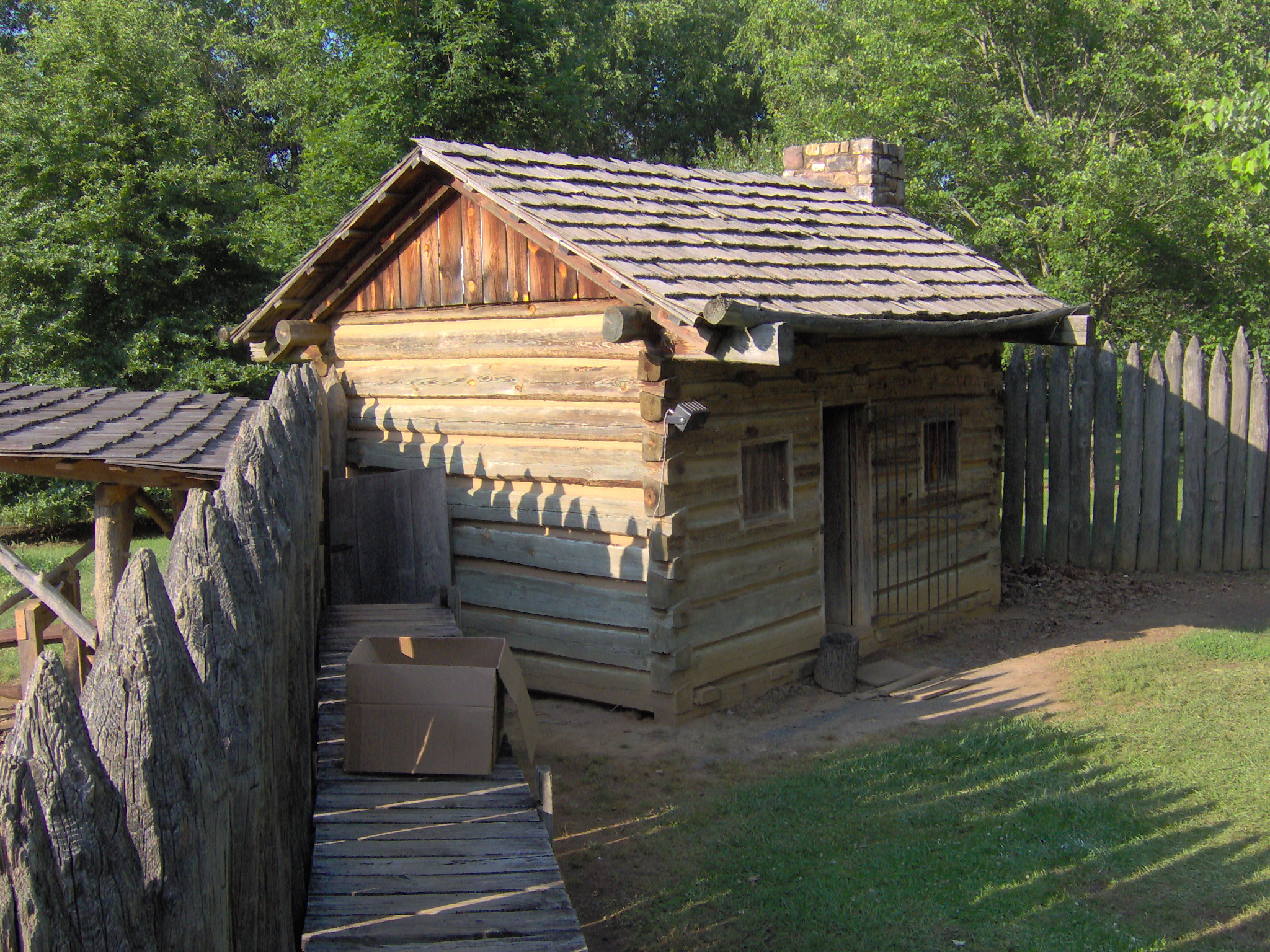
Fort Watauga's palisade, parapet, and north corner cabin

19th-century historian J. G. M. Ramsey provided the most often-cited description of the Fort Watauga location in his Annals of Tennessee, published in 1852. Ramsey, who visited Elizabethton and observed what he believed were the fort's remains, placed the fort location at approximately 0.5 miles (0.80 km) northeast of the mouth of Gap Creek, along what is now the intersection of West G Street and Monument Place (the site is marked by the 1909 D.A.R. monument).

A contemporary and corresponding friend of Ramsey, Wisconsin historian Lyman C. Draper, placed Fort Watauga at a different location, approximately 1 mile (1.6 km) downstream from the mouth of the Doe River (about 2 miles northeast of Ramsey's location), at a point that is the in outfield of the Joe O'Brien Field, immediately south of the Watauga River

The Ramsey location for Fort Watauga also places the stockade fort two miles further distant west from the historic homesteads of John Carter, John Sevier, and James Robertson (all who were militia leaders and defenders during the July, 1776 Cherokee siege of Fort Watauga) than does the Draper location. The early Tennessee explorer and pioneer James Robertson first build his homestead during 1770-1771 along the north side of the Watauga River at the mouth of the Doe River. Draper also recorded that the historic site of Fort Watauga was also located approximately four miles away from the John Sevier plantation that was located near the mouth of Stoney Creek, south of the Watauga River in Lynn Valley.

Little detail is known of the original design of Fort Watauga. Ramsey described the fort as situated on a knoll, and Draper wrote that the fort was surrounded by an open glade within easy firing distance of the north bank of the Watauga River. The 1974 state excavations uncovered partial trench-like formations 300 feet (91 m) west of the D.A.R. marker that state archaeologist Carl Kuttruff believed to be the remains of Fort Watauga based upon the Ramsey description.

The 1974 excavations revealed that the fort had an irregular shape, and that it probably consisted of a group of cabins connected by a stockade. The shape of the reconstructed fort was based largely on the formations uncovered in these excavations, and its design was based on contemporary Appalachian frontier forts, which typically consisted of log structures (some with overhanging second stories) and a stockade of sharpened poles surrounding a 1-acre (0.40 ha) courtyard. The current reconstructed fort is about 1,500 yards (1,400 m) northeast of the Ramsey location and about a mile west of the Draper location.
