= Overmountain Men =

American frontiersmen from west of the Appalachian Mountains

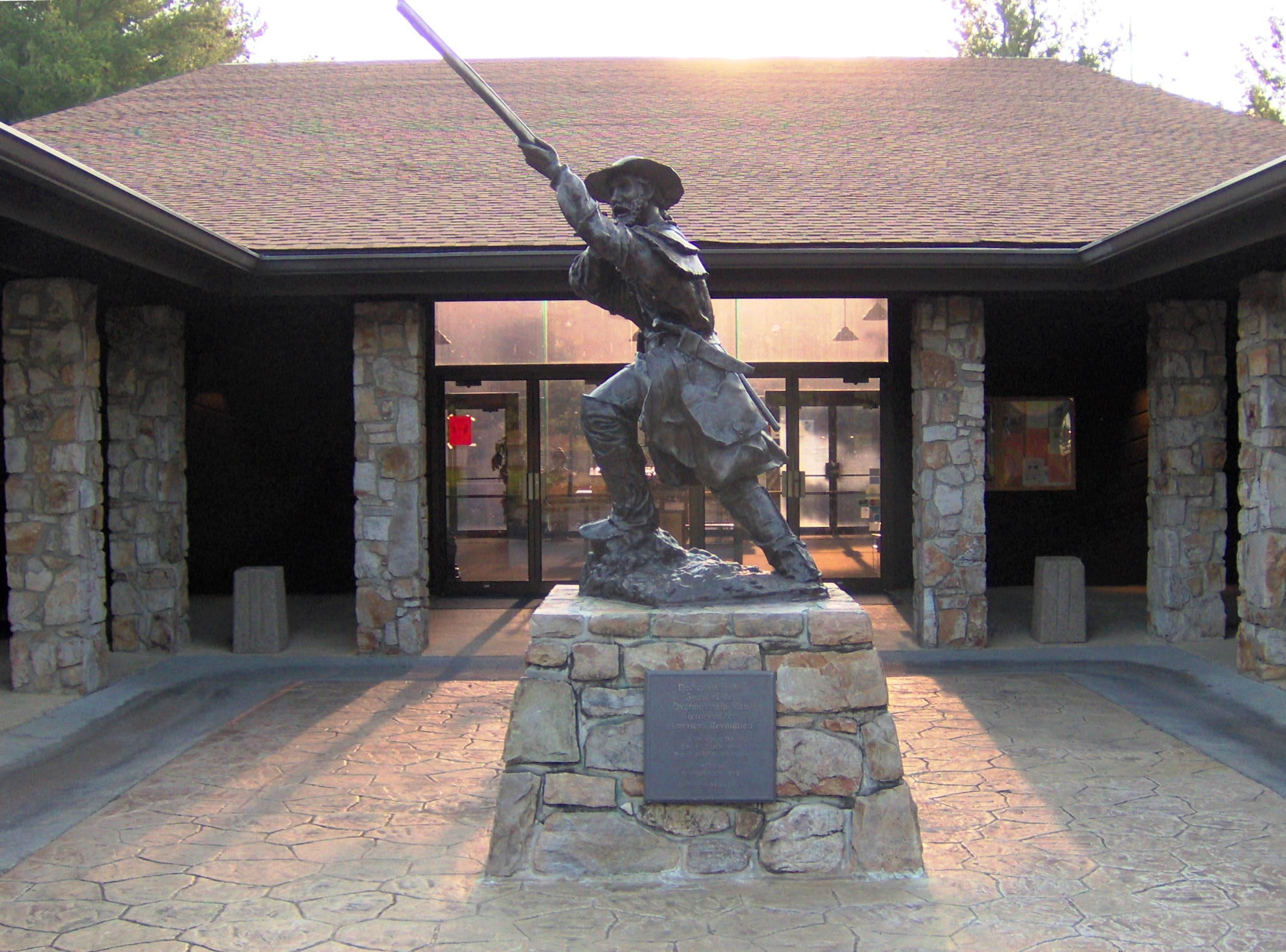
The Overmountain Man statue, by Jon-Mark Estep, at Sycamore Shoals State Historic Park, in Elizabethton, Tennessee

The Overmountain Men were American frontiersmen from west of the Blue Ridge Mountains which are the leading edge of the Appalachian Mountains, who took part in the American Revolutionary War. While they were present at multiple engagements in the war's southern campaign, they are best known for their role in the American victory at the Battle of Kings Mountain in 1780. The term "overmountain" arose because their settlements were west of, or "over", the Blue Ridge, which was the primary geographical boundary dividing several of the 13 American states from the Native American lands to the west. The Overmountain Men hailed from parts of Virginia, North Carolina, and what is now Tennessee and Kentucky.

The efforts of the Overmountain Men helped to solidify the existence of the fragile settlements in the Watauga, Nolichucky, and Holston river valleys, the legitimacy of which had been questioned by the British Crown for several years. Many Overmountain Men, including John Sevier, John Rhea, and Isaac Shelby, went on to play prominent roles in the establishment of the states of Tennessee and Kentucky. The foothold they gained on the frontier helped open the door to mass westward migration in ensuing decades.

== The Overmountain settlements ==
In the late 1760s and early 1770s, Euro-American settlers began pouring into what is now northeastern Tennessee and southwestern Virginia, causing considerable agitation among the Overhill Cherokees and other tribes who controlled the area. The Treaty of Lochaber, signed in 1770 between the British and the Cherokee, moved the boundary of British territory south to Long Island of the Holston (modern Kingsport, Tennessee). While this brought settlements north of the Holston under British protection, the settlers south of the river were ordered to leave.

Rather than comply with the Crown's order, the illegal settlers —mostly concentrated at the Watauga settlement at Sycamore Shoals (in present-day Elizabethton), the Nolichucky settlement (near modern Greeneville), and Carter's Valley (near modern Kingsport) —decided to lease their land from the Cherokee, and in 1772 established the Watauga Association, which was the first independent American constitutional government west of the Appalachians. In 1775, the Watauga and Nolichucky settlers purchased their leased lands outright and formed the independent Washington District. They almost immediately petitioned Virginia for annexation, which was denied. They were later annexed by North Carolina and became Washington County, North Carolina.

The Crown and the colonial governments (especially Virginia) considered the land purchases illegal, and ordered the settlers to leave what they considered to be Cherokee lands. Also, some factions of the Cherokee became agitated when these settlements began expanding rapidly, and tribal chiefs amiable to the settlers fell out of favor. A young Cherokee chief, Dragging Canoe, who had been opposed to the sale of tribal lands, called for the violent removal of all European settlers west of the mountains. He led an estimated one thousand followers (eventually referred to as the Chickamauga) away from the American settlements and carried on an armed struggle against the new country for almost twenty more years (see the Cherokee–American wars) after the failed Cherokee attacks against the Overmountain settlements in the summer of 1776.

== Revolutionary War ==
=== Early conflicts ===
At the outbreak of the American Revolution in 1776, the Overmountain settlers (most of whom were Whigs opposed to the monarchy) began preparing for invasion. The signing of the Watauga Petition and its acceptance by North Carolina —annexing the Washington District to that colony —added further impetus to the Cherokee, who were also being encouraged by the British, to push the American frontiersmen out of the Overmountain settlements. The invasion came in July of that year. While settlers were chased out of Carter's Valley and the Nolichucky settlements, the Cherokee were defeated at Eaton's Station on July 20 and at Fort Watauga on July 21, and eventually retreated from the area. The settlers' struggles gained them the sympathies of North Carolina's revolutionary leaders, who in 1777, allowed the settlements of the Washington District to join equally with the colony, designating the Overmountain area as (the original) Washington County, North Carolina.

The Overmountain Men took part (to varying degrees) in numerous operations against British Loyalists and the British-aligned Cherokee and Shawnee all along the Appalachian frontier. Twenty Wataugans helped defend the Boonesborough and Harrodsburg settlements (in modern Kentucky) from Shawnee attacks in 1778.

During the summer of 1780, a group of Overmountain Men led by Isaac Shelby joined up with Colonel Charles McDowell to raid Loyalist outposts in the Piedmont mountain region of northwestern South Carolina. The Overmountain Men captured Fort Thickety on the Pacolet River and aided in the Patriot victory at the Battle of Musgrove Mill. With the approach of 1780 harvesting season, however, most of the Overmountain Men returned to their farms on the frontier. McDowell stayed behind with a small contingent to continue harassing loyalists.

=== Call to arms ===
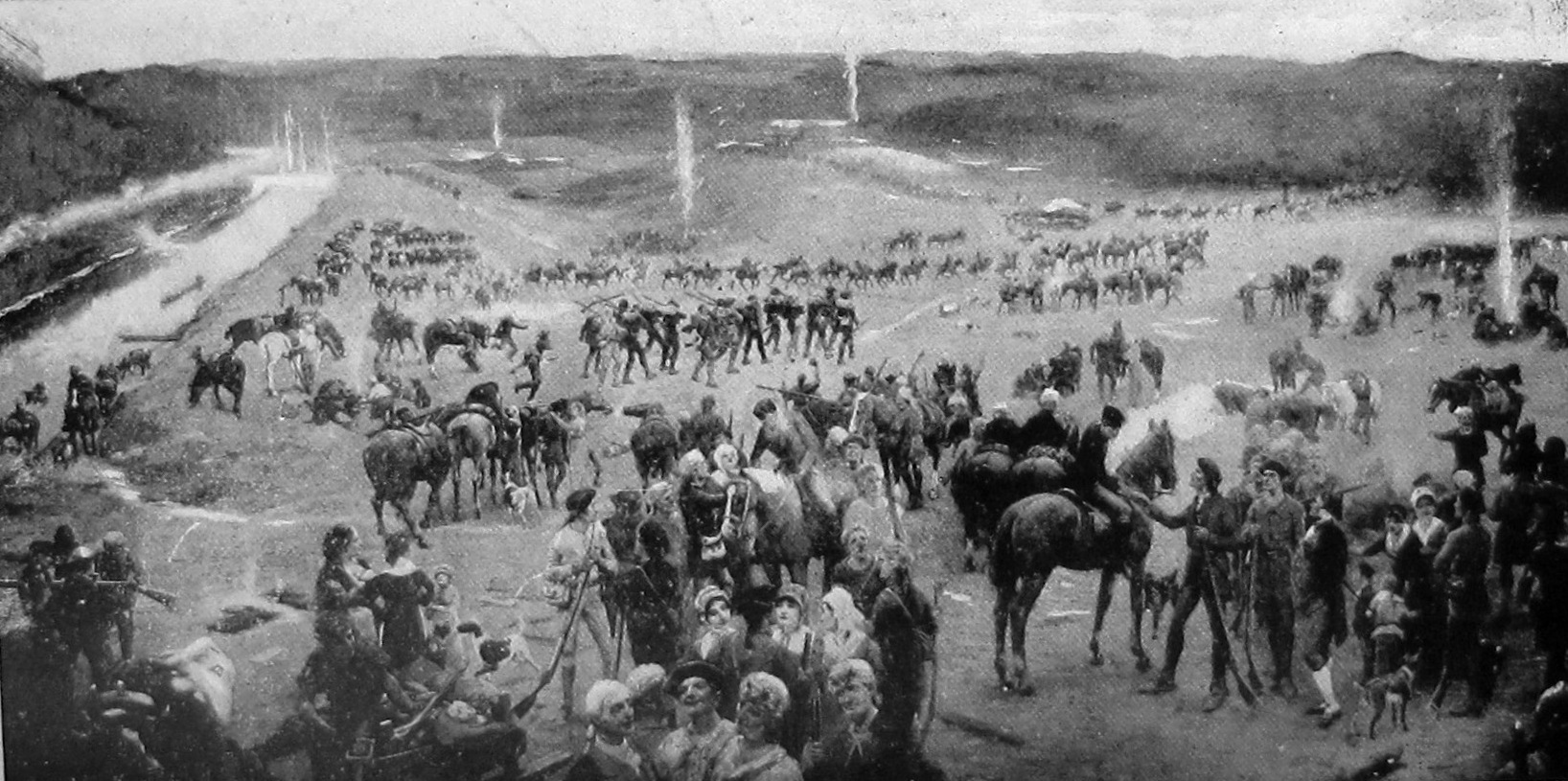
Artist Lloyd Branson's depiction of the gathering of the Overmountain Men at Sycamore Shoals

After winning a decisive victory at the Battle of Camden in August 1780, British General Charles Cornwallis invaded North Carolina, and sent Major Patrick Ferguson into the mountains to root out the Patriot irregulars and protect the region's loyalists. Ferguson quickly routed McDowell's badly-outnumbered force, and McDowell retreated across the mountains to the Washington District. Ferguson pardoned a captured frontiersmen named Samuel Phillips (a cousin to Isaac Shelby) so that Phillips could carry a message to the Overmountain settlements. In the message, Ferguson warned the Overmountain Men that if they didn't lay down their arms, he would "march his army over the mountains, hang their leaders, and lay waste the country with fire and sword."

Upon receiving the message, Shelby rode 40 miles (64 km) to Watauga to consult with John Sevier, and the two agreed to raise armies and cross the mountains to engage Ferguson. On September 25, 1780, several hundred frontiersmen gathered at Sycamore Shoals. Lead had been mined at nearby Bumpass Cove for ammunition, Sullivan County merchant John Adair volunteered funds for the expedition, and women prepared clothing and food for the long march. Black powder for the expedition was manufactured by Mary Patton at the Patton mill along nearby Powder Branch. The assembled force consisted of 240 men led by Sevier from Washington County, North Carolina (now Washington County, Tennessee) and the other counties of the Washington District; 240 from Sullivan County led by Shelby; and 400 from southwestern Virginia led by Colonel William Campbell. This main body planned to meet up with the remnants of McDowell's army in the mountains, bringing the total number to just over 1,000. Homeguards were left at Holston and Watauga under Anthony Bledsoe (1739–1788) and Charles Robertson, respectively.

=== March over the mountains ===
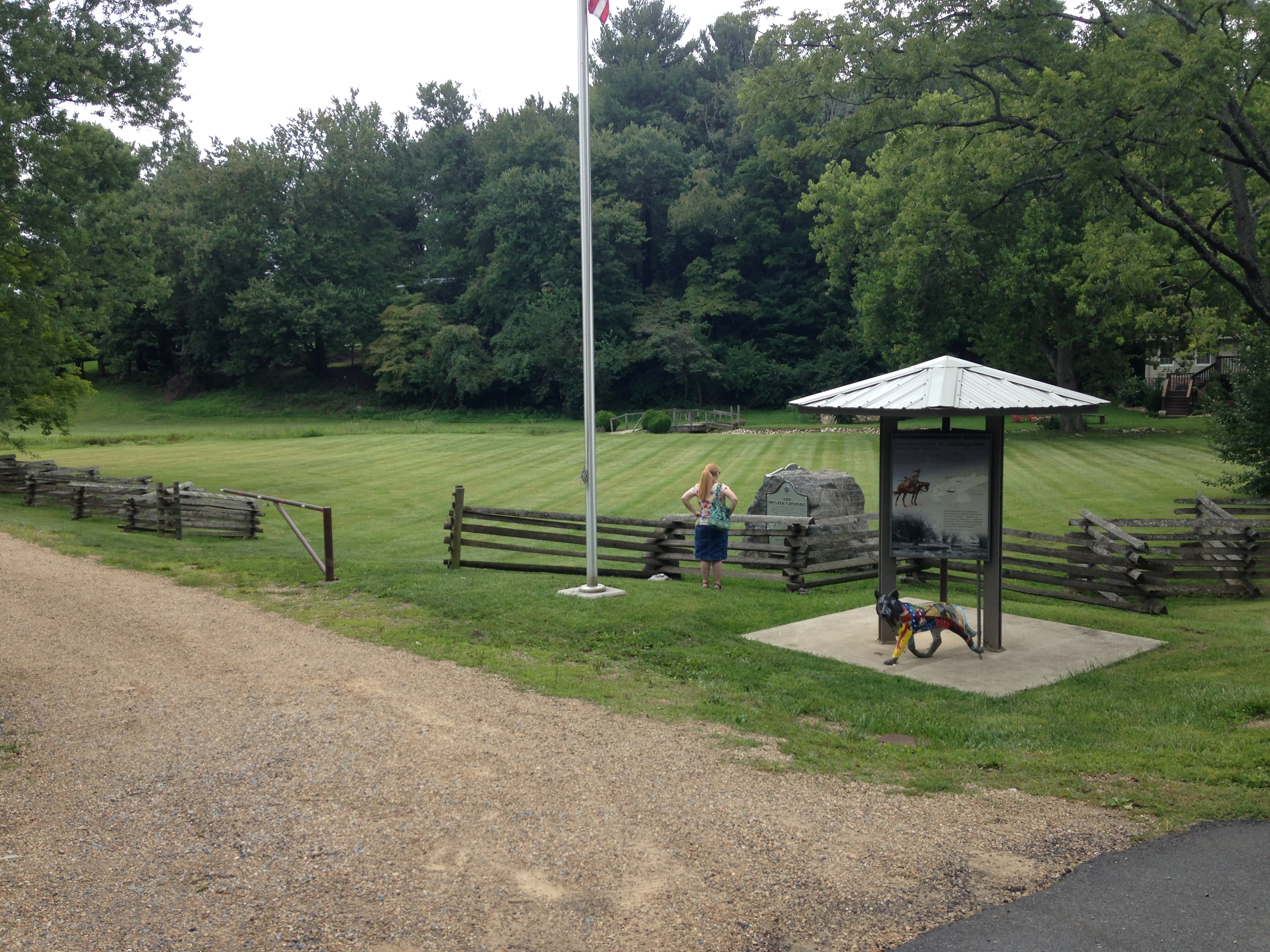
Abingdon Muster Grounds - The northern trailhead of the 330-mile long Overmountain Victory National Historic Trail.

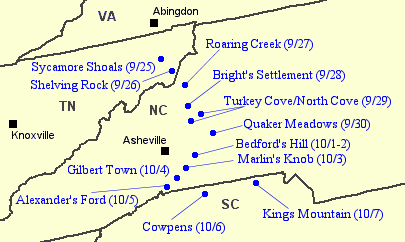
Map showing camps of the Overmountain Men, September 25–October 7, 1780. Abingdon and modern Knoxville and Asheville are shown for reference

Campbell and his company of 400 Virginians gathered in Abingdon on lands owned by Capt. Andrew Colvill, now known as the Abingdon Muster Grounds, on the banks of Wolf Creek on September 23, 1780, and began the first leg of the march to meet up with a group of "Tennesseans" at Rocky Mount on September 24. They arrived at Sycamore Shoals on the 25th. On September 26, after a fiery sermon by Reverend Samuel Doak, the Overmountain Men began their long trek over the Blue Ridge, marching from Sycamore Shoals to Shelving Rock at the base of Roan Mountain, where they camped for the night. After crossing the mountain at Yellow Mountain Gap, they followed a well-worn path up the North Toe River Valley to Bright's settlement (modern Spruce Pine, North Carolina). On September 29, the force split up at Gillespie Gap (atop the eastern Blue Ridge), with Campbell's contingent descending to Wofford's Fort in Turkey Cove, and Sevier and Shelby's forces descending to North Cove to link up with McDowell. The force reunited the following day and spent the night at the McDowell family plantation at Quaker Meadows (modern Morganton, North Carolina), where they were joined by a 300-man contingent under Benjamin Cleveland and Joseph Winston. While camped atop Bedford's Hill on October 1, the force's leaders bickered over who had full command, and Charles McDowell was dispatched to the headquarters of General Horatio Gates to request he name a permanent commander. McDowell left his unit under the command of his brother, Joseph McDowell.

On October 4, the Overmountain Men reached Ferguson's base at Gilbert Town (near modern Rutherfordton), although Ferguson had evacuated eastward toward Charlotte to be closer to the main British army. The following day, while camped at Alexander's Ford along the Green River, a spy told the frontiersmen that Ferguson was headed for Ninety-Six, and the force thus headed southeastward into South Carolina. On October 6, the frontiersmen reached Cowpens, where they were joined by a force of 400 South Carolinians under James Williams and a smaller force of North Carolina militiamen under Lt. Colonel Frederick Hambright, including Lt. Colonel Joseph Hardin and Major John Hardin. A spy notified the force that Ferguson was camped 30 miles (48 km) to the east, and a large number of frontiersmen marched through the night in hopes of forcing a confrontation.

=== Battle of Kings Mountain ===
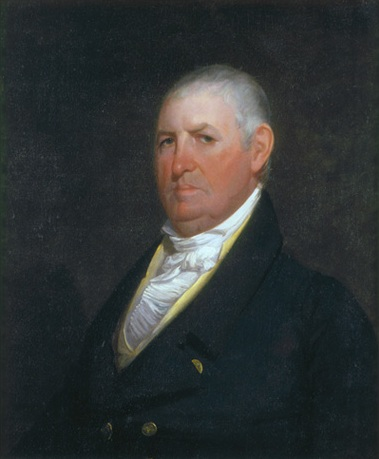
Isaac Shelby

With the Overmountain Men and Patriot forces fast approaching, Ferguson decided to entrench his 1000-strong loyalist force atop Kings Mountain, a 60-foot (18 m) flat-top hill about 50 miles (80 km) west of Charlotte, near the North Carolina–South Carolina line. Patriot forces reached Kings Mountain on the afternoon of October 7, and formed a U-shape around the mountain, effectively flanking the loyalists. Around 3 P.M., after several minutes of minor skirmishing, William Campbell told his men to "shout like hell and fight like devils," and two companies simultaneously opened fire on the loyalist positions. Shelby, Sevier, Williams, and Cleveland pushed from the north side of the mountain, while Campbell, Winston, and Joseph McDowell pushed from the south side.

While Kings Mountain was difficult to scale, the mountain's slopes were heavily wooded, providing Patriot riflemen ample cover. Both Campbell and Shelby twice attempted to charge up the mountain, but were driven back by loyalist rifle fire. After about an hour, however, the frontier sharpshooters had taken a devastating toll on the loyalists' ranks, and Campbell and Shelby managed to reach the summit. Ferguson was killed by sharpshooters, and the remaining loyalists surrendered. Loyalist casualties included 157 killed, 163 so severely wounded they were left on the field, and 698 captured. Patriot casualties were 28 killed and 62 wounded. Among the Patriot dead was South Carolina militia leader James Williams. John Sevier's brother, Robert, was also mortally wounded. The loyalist prisoners were marched toward the mountains, pausing in northern Rutherford County, where several were put on trial for atrocities allegedly committed on the frontier, and nine were hanged, including Colonel Ambrose Mills.

== Aftermath and legacy ==
His western flank now exposed, Cornwallis abandoned his invasion of North Carolina and fell back to Winnsboro, South Carolina. After the victory, Sevier dispatched Joseph Greer to Philadelphia to deliver news of the victory to the Continental Congress. Most of the Overmountain Men returned to the Washington District, where in subsequent months John Sevier, Joseph Hardin and Arthur Campbell (brother of William) led an expedition against the Cherokee to further secure the frontier. William Campbell returned to South Carolina in 1781 to aid Daniel Morgan's Continentals against another British incursion into the region, but arrived the day after Morgan's decisive victory at Cowpens.

In later years, Sevier and Shelby played important roles in the establishment of Tennessee and Kentucky, respectively. Other influential Overmountain Men included John Crockett (father of Davy Crockett), William Lenoir, Joseph Dickson, Daniel Smith, William Russell, and John Rhea, all of whom were at Kings Mountain, and Anthony Bledsoe, who commanded the homeguard for the Holston settlement while the main force was away.

In 1980, Congress appropriated funds for the establishment of the Overmountain Victory National Historic Trail, which follows the original marching route of the Overmountain Men between the mustering grounds at Sycamore Shoals State Historic Park and battle site at Kings Mountain National Military Park, and includes several branch trails in Virginia and North Carolina. The Shelving Rock site, where the Overmountain Men camped on the first night of their march, was added to the National Register of Historic Places in 2009. The Overmountain Men are the subject of numerous books, including a historical novel by Cameron Judd, and a play entitled The Wataugans.

== See also ==
- Kentucky County, Virginia
- Overhill Cherokee
- Southwest Territory
- Trans-Appalachia
- Wilderness Road
