= Watauga Association =

18th Century semi-autonomous government

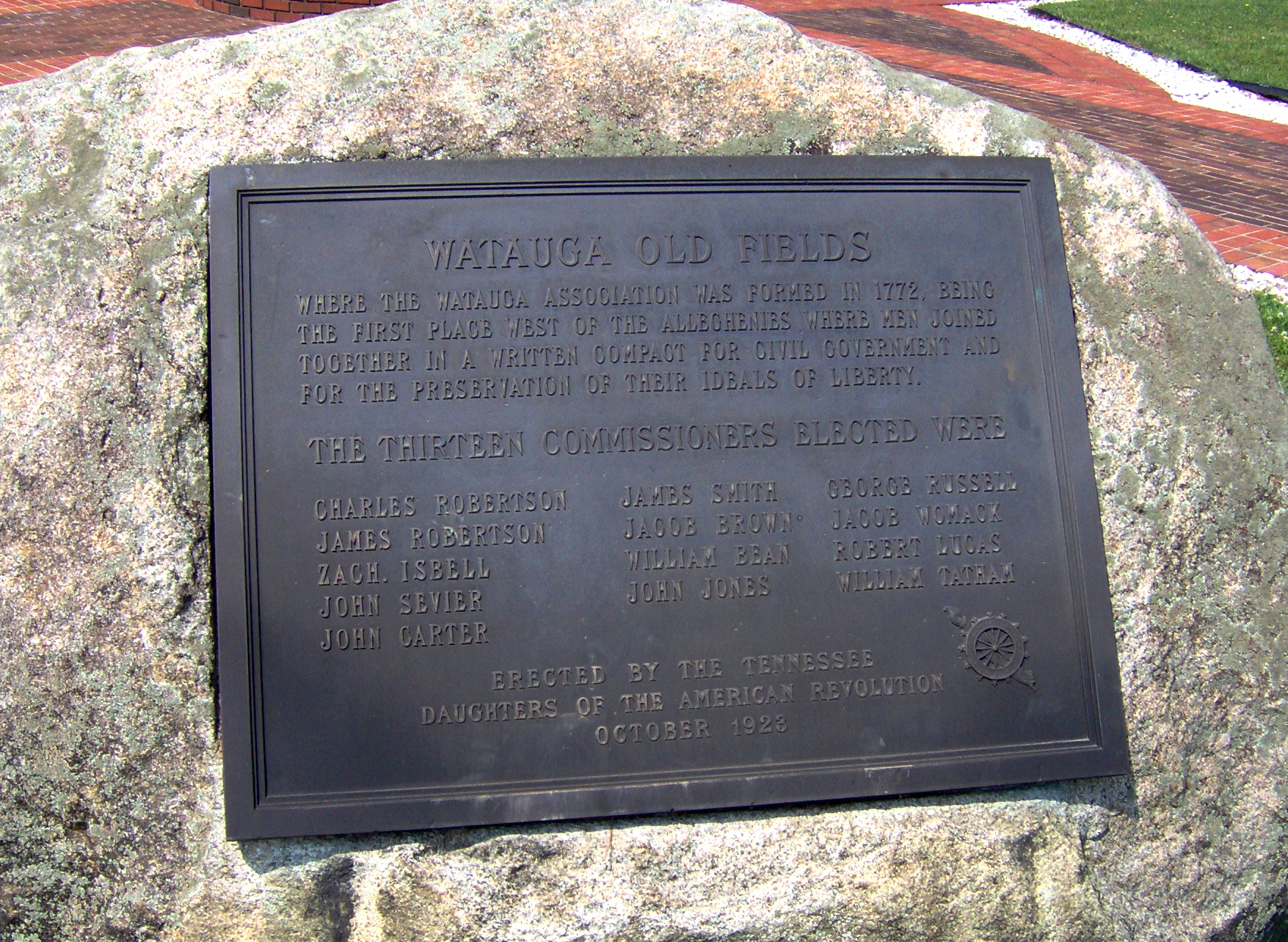
- DAR monument in Elizabethton, Tennessee, recalling the establishment of the Watauga Association

- Location of the Watauga settlement on modern map of Tennessee
- Coordinates: 36°20′33″N 82°25′21″W
- Articles of the Watauga Association: 1772–April 1775
- Seat: Sycamore Shoals

Government
  - Type: Semi-autonomous colony
  - Body: five-member court

The Watauga Association (sometimes referred to as the Republic of Watauga) was a semi-autonomous government created in 1772 by frontier settlers living along the Watauga River in what is now Elizabethton, Tennessee. Although it lasted only a few years, the Watauga Association provided a basis for what later developed into the state of Tennessee and likely influenced other western frontier governments in the trans-Appalachian region. North Carolina annexed the Watauga settlement area, by then known as the Washington District, in November 1776. Within a year, the area was placed under a county government, becoming Washington County, North Carolina, in November 1777. This area covers the present day Washington County, Carter County, and other areas now located in the northeast part of the state of Tennessee.

While there is no evidence that the Watauga Association ever claimed to be outside the sovereign territory of the British Crown, historians have often cited the Association as the earliest attempt by American-born colonists to form an independent democratic government. In 1774, Virginia governor Lord Dunmore called the Watauga Association a "dangerous example" of Americans forming a government "distinct from and independent of his majesty's authority." President Theodore Roosevelt later wrote that the Watauga settlers were the "first men of American birth to establish a free and independent community on the continent." While no copy of the settlers' compact, known as the Articles of the Watauga Association, has ever been found, related documents tend to imply that the Watauga settlers still considered themselves British subjects, even after the initial hostilities of the American Revolution had commenced.

== History ==
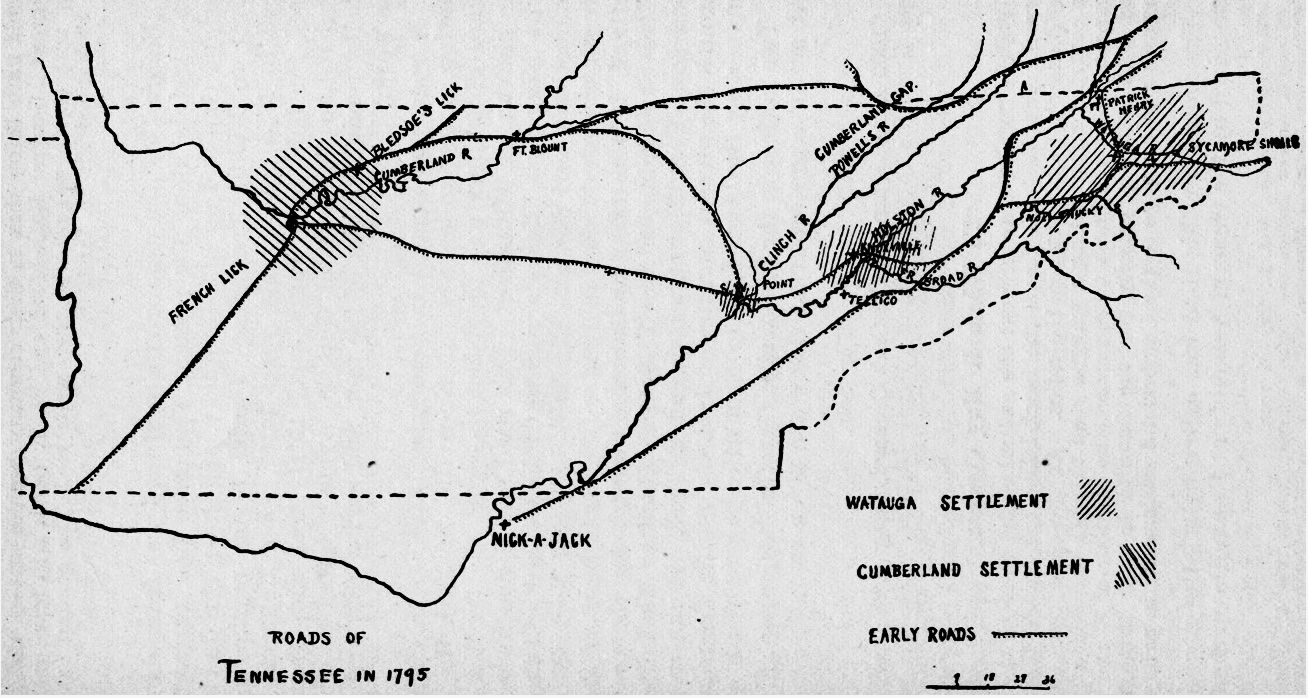
Roads of Tennessee in 1795

European settlers began arriving in the Watauga, Nolichucky, and Holston river valleys in the late 1760s and early 1770s, most migrating from Virginia via the Great Valley, although a few were believed to have been Regulators fleeing North Carolina after their defeat at the Battle of Alamance. These settlers mistakenly believed (or at least claimed to have believed) the Watauga and Nolichucky valleys were part of lands ceded to Virginia by the Cherokee in the 1770 Treaty of Lochaber, but a subsequent survey by Colonel John Donelson confirmed that these lands were still part of the Cherokee domain. As settlement on lands west of colonial boundaries violated the Royal Proclamation of 1763, the Watauga and Nolichucky settlers were ordered to leave.

In May 1772, the Watauga and Nolichucky settlers negotiated a 10-year lease directly with the Cherokee, and being outside the claims of any colony, established the Watauga Association to provide basic government functions. The lease and the subsequent purchase of these lands in 1775 were considered illegal by the British Crown, and were vehemently opposed by a growing faction of the Cherokee led by the young chief Dragging Canoe. With the outbreak of the American Revolutionary War (April 1775), the settlers organized themselves into the "Washington District," loyal to the "united colonies," and formed a Committee of Safety to govern it, marking the end of the so-called "Watauga Republic".

In Spring of 1776, the Washington District Committee of Safety drafted a petition asking the colony of Virginia to annex the district. After Virginia refused, the Committee drafted a similar petition (dated July 5, 1776) asking the North Carolina Assembly to annex the district. In November of that year, North Carolina granted the petition and formally annexed the area. The Washington District was finally admitted to North Carolina as Washington County in November 1777.

The Cherokee, who were aligned with the British, launched an all-out invasion against the settlements in July 1776, but were soundly defeated. In 1777, the Cherokee signed the Treaty of Long Island, ceding control of the Watauga and Nolichucky valleys to the American colonies.

== Structure ==
Since no copy of the Articles of the Watauga Association has ever been found, most of what is known about it comes from other sources, primarily the 1776 Petition of the Inhabitants of the Washington District, commonly called the "Watauga Petition," in which the Wataugans requested annexation by North Carolina. According to the Petition, the Articles were fashioned after the laws of Virginia and were enacted by unanimous consent of the settlers. The primary reason given for the establishment of the Watauga Association was to prevent the Watauga and Nolichucky regions from becoming a haven for debtors and felons, and for conducting "public business" such as the recording of deeds and wills. Other sources, such as the later writings of Washington District Committee of Safety clerk pro tem William Tatham (1752–1819) and documents collected by historian J. G. M. Ramsey in the mid-19th century, reveal that the Articles established a five-member court (the members of which were elected), and that the Wataugans erected a courthouse and jail at Sycamore Shoals.

Historians disagree over the first five magistrates of the court, although most agree that it included John Carter, James Robertson, Charles Robertson, and Zachariah Isbell. The fifth member was probably Jacob Brown. Later court members included Andrew Greer, John Roddye, and John Sevier. James Smith was probably the court's first clerk, replaced by Sevier in 1775. When Sevier was elected to the court, Felix Walker took over as clerk, with Tatham serving in his absence.

== Military affairs ==
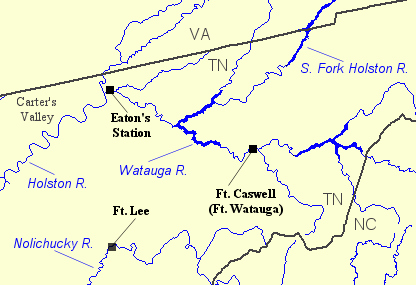
The area of the 1776 summer attacks by the Overhill Cherokee

Wataugan militiamen were present at multiple engagements on the frontier and throughout the American Revolution. A company of 20 Wataugans took part in the Battle of Point Pleasant in 1774 during Lord Dunmore's War, and another contingent aided in the defense of Boonesborough and Harrodsburg later in the decade.

The Washington District Committee of Safety, created in 1775, consisted of John Carter, Zachariah Isbell, Jacob Brown, John Sevier, James Smith, James and Charles Robertson, William Bean, John Jones, George Russell, and Robert Lucas. The Committee acquired arms and oversaw the construction of Fort Watauga (initially named Fort Caswell and located at present day Elizabethton, Tennessee), where they thwarted one wing of the Cherokee invasion of July 1776. Wataugans took part in William Christian's punitive expedition and the Rutherford Light Horse expedition against the Overhill towns in the latter half of 1776.

Even at the height of the Cherokee threat in the Spring and Summer of 1776, the Wataugans heeded a call to arms and dispatched a company of riflemen under Felix Walker to aide in the defense of Charleston in South Carolina. In August 1780, a small contingent led by Col. Isaac Shelby fought in the American Patriot victory at the Battle of Musgrove Mill near present-day Clinton, South Carolina. In late September 1780, the Overmountain Men—the frontier militia that crossed the Appalachian Mountains and defeated an army of British loyalists at the Battle of Kings Mountain—mustered at Sycamore Shoals, and included 240 Wataugans under the command of Cols. John Sevier and Isaac Shelby. After the battle, Sevier led a second punitive expedition against the Cherokee in which he destroyed the Chickamauga Cherokee villages near modern Chattanooga.

At least one Wataugan, William Tatham, was present at the Battle of Yorktown in 1781.

== Legacy ==
The Articles of the Watauga Association likely influenced the Cumberland Compact (drafted in 1780), the main link between the two pacts being James Robertson, who in 1779 led a group of colonists into what is now the Nashville area. The Clarksville Compact, drafted for the Clarksville settlement in 1785, may have also been inspired by the Watauga Association (the Clarksville Compact even adopted the laws of Virginia, even though the settlement was clearly within the territory of North Carolina). In the mid-1780s, some former Wataugans (especially John Sevier) played a key role in the establishment of the failed State of Franklin.

Numerous historians in the 19th and early 20th centuries romanticized the Watauga Association as the first democratic or constitutional government formed by American-born colonists. Historian Andrew C. McLaughlin, in his first major work on the history of the U.S. Constitution, wrote of the Wataugans, "one can find no more striking fact in American history, nor one more typical, than the simple ease with which those frontiersmen ... formed an association and extended the rights and privileges of self-government." McLaughlin's colleague Claude Van Tyne wrote of the Wataugans, "like the Pilgrim Fathers they were without formal laws and institutions, and they made them." In The Winning of the West, Theodore Roosevelt treated the Watauga Association as a microcosm of the subsequent American Revolution, writing, "the Watauga settlers outlined in advance the nation's work. They tamed the rugged and shaggy wilderness, they bid defiance to outside foes, and they successfully solved the difficult problem of self-government." Recent historians point out that while the Watauga Association was one of the first constitutional governments west of the Appalachians, it was not intended as a government separate from the English colonies.

== See also ==
- Cherokee–American wars
- Southwest Territory
- State of Franklin
