= Timeline of Tennessee =

The following is a timeline of the history of the US state of Tennessee.

== Before the 16th century ==
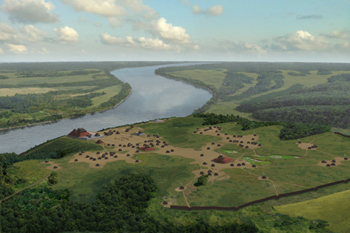
Shiloh Mounds, a Mississippian site in Hardin County

- c. 10,000 BC – Paleo-Indians are known to exist in Tennessee, as evidenced by a mastodon skeleton with cut marks found in Williamson County.
- c. 7500 BC – Icehouse Bottom in Monroe County is used as a hunting camp, making it one of the oldest known habitation areas in the state.
- c. 1-500 AD – The Pinson Mounds complex, one of the largest Middle Woodland sites in the United States, is created in Madison County.
- c. 800-1600 AD – During the Mississippian period, many sites are created in Tennessee, including Chucalissa, Mound Bottom, Shiloh Mounds, and Toqua.

== 16th and 17th centuries ==
- 1540 – Hernando de Soto's expedition arrives from modern day North Carolina and enters East Tennessee in June. The expedition stays at Chiaha in Sevier County for several weeks before leaving to the south.
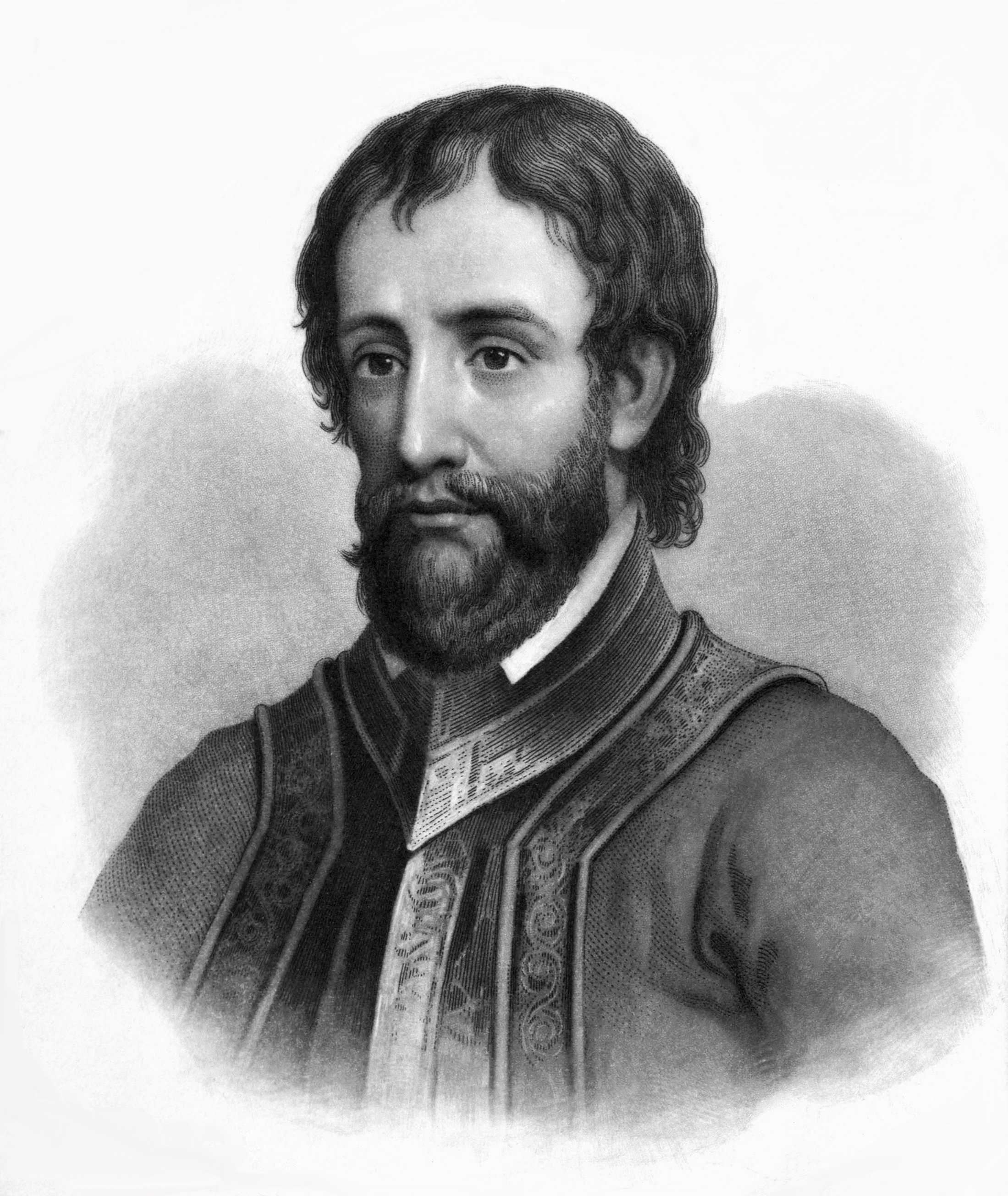
  Hernando de Soto, the first European to set foot in Tennessee
- 1559 – Part of Tristán de Luna's expedition under Mateo del Sauz moves into the Chattanooga area in August in order to return the Napochie tribe to vassal status under the Coosa chiefdom so that the Spaniards could receive food from the Coosa. Sauz's expedition succeeds and returns south around August 1560.
- 1567 – Part of Juan Pardo's expedition under Hernando Moyano de Morales moves into Tennessee and stays at Chiaha, building a fort called San Pedro. Pardo later came to Moyano at Chiaha before the expedition returned to Santa Elena in modern South Carolina.
- 1682 – A French expedition down the Mississippi River under René-Robert Cavelier, Sieur de La Salle stops in West Tennessee and builds a simple fortification called Fort Prudhomme while looking for a missing crew member before continuing downriver.

== 18th century ==
- 1739
  - August 15 – During the Chickasaw Wars, Frenchmen under Jean-Baptiste Le Moyne de Bienville venture into Shelby County, building Fort Assumption in present-day Downtown Memphis. The fort is abandoned on March 31, 1740.
- 1756
  - October 5 – During the French and Indian War, the British begin construction of Fort Loudoun in modern-day Monroe County to protect the local Cherokee, making the fort one of the first British structures in modern-day Tennessee.
- 1760
  - February–August – Relations between the British and the Cherokee worsen, leading to the Anglo-Cherokee War. Fort Loudoun is besieged, and surrenders with most of its garrison killed or captured.
- 1763
  - October 7 – King George III issues the Royal Proclamation of 1763, forbidding settlement in Tennessee and making it an Indian Reserve.
- c. 1768 – The first white settlers begin moving into the Watauga, Nolichucky, and Holston areas in violation of the Royal Proclamation of 1763. They believe they are in Virginia.
- 1771
  - May 16 – The Battle of Alamance ends the War of the Regulation in North Carolina, and many former Regulators (those opposed to the North Carolina government) settle in Tennessee.
- 1772
  - May – Watauga and Nolichucky settlers negotiate a 10-year lease with the Cherokee and create a constitution called the Articles of the Watauga Association based on the laws of Virginia. The settlers build a courthouse and jail at Sycamore Shoals, and their government becomes known as the Watauga Association.
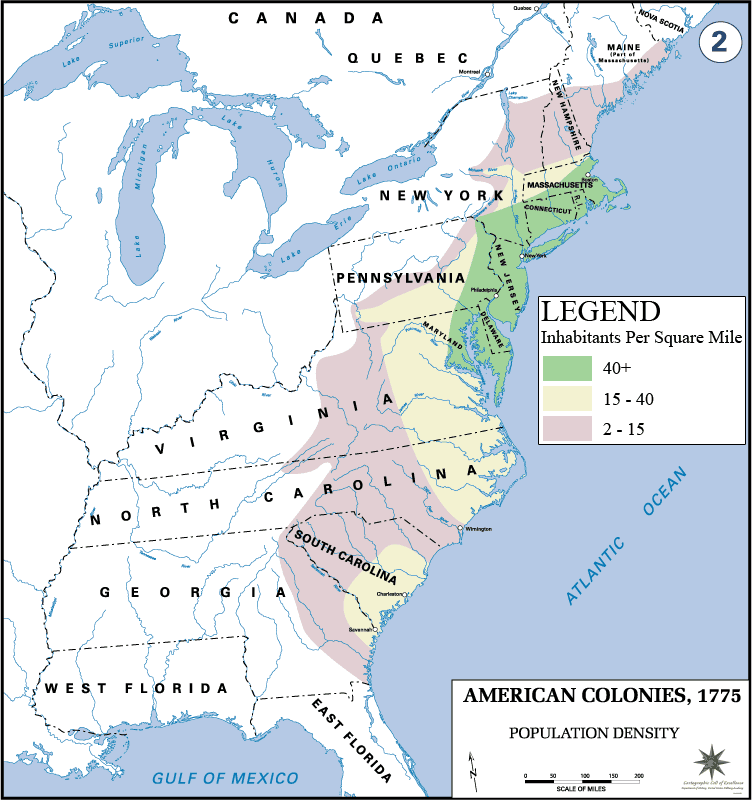
    A map of the colonies during the American Revolution with the Washington District shown as part of North Carolina
- 1775
  - March 19 – Richard Henderson and the Cherokee agree to the Treaty of Sycamore Shoals, also known as the Transylvania Purchase, in which the Cherokee transfer the Path Grant, with land in northern East Tennessee, and the Great Grant, with the land north of the Cumberland River, including the site of modern Nashville.
  - April – With the outbreak of war with Britain, the Watauga Association declares itself loyal to the united colonies as the Washington District.
- 1776
  - Longhunter and pioneer William Bean establishes the town of Bean Station in Grainger County, becoming the first reported permanent settlement in Tennessee.
  - May – Dragging Canoe and the Chickamauga break from the Cherokee due to opposition to white settlement and begin the Chickamauga Wars.
  - November – After unsuccessfully asking Virginia to annex the Washington District, the settlers are admitted to North Carolina.
- 1777
  - November 15 – Washington County is created from the Washington District, making it the oldest county in what is now Tennessee.
- 1779
  - February – James Robertson establishes Fort Nashborough, which would become Nashville. John Donelson later arrives with more settlers, who sign the Cumberland Compact.
  - October 18 – Sullivan County is created from Washington County, making it the second-oldest county in what is now Tennessee.
- 1780
  - October 7 – Overmountain Men from Washington and Sullivan Counties win the pivotal Battle of Kings Mountain near Kings Mountain, North Carolina, after a march over the mountains.
  - Surveyors from Virginia and North Carolina survey the modern Tennessee–Virginia border. The North Carolinians' "Henderson Line" is two miles north of the Virginians' "Walker Line", creating a disputed area between the states.
- 1783
  - April 18 – Greene County is created from Washington County.
  - October 6 – Davidson County is created from Washington County, making it the oldest county in Middle Tennessee.
- 1791
  - The Knoxville Gazette, first Tennessee newspaper, begun.
- 1794
  - Blount College, a predecessor of the University of Tennessee, founded in Knoxville, first American nondenominational institution of higher learning.
- 1796
  - February 6 - Tennessee adopts a constitution.
  - June 1 - Tennessee becomes the 16th of the United States.
  - John Sevier elected the first governor of Tennessee.
  - Andrew Jackson elected first congressman of Tennessee.

== 19th century ==
On June 8, 1861, Tennessee seceded from the United States to join The confederacy, becoming the last state to do so

== 21st century ==
=== 2000s ===
- 2001
  - October 3 – An attack on a Greyhound bus near Manchester kills the driver and causes the bus to crash, killing seven.
- 2002
  - November 5 – With governor Don Sundquist term-limited, Phil Bredesen narrowly beats Van Hilleary in the 2002 gubernatorial election, becoming the 48th governor of Tennessee.
    The results of the 2002 gubernatorial election. Blue shows counties won by Bredesen and red shows counties won by Hilleary.
- 2005
  - November 8 – A school shooting leaves one dead and two injured in Jacksboro.
- 2006
  - November 7 – Winning every county, incumbent governor Phil Bredesen defeats Jim Bryson in the 2006 gubernatorial election. Tennesseans also vote on the Tennessee Marriage Protection Amendment, a state constitutional amendment prohibiting same-sex marriages, which passes with 81% of the vote.
- 2008
  - February 5–6 – A tornado outbreak on Super Tuesday kills many in West and Middle Tennessee, especially impacting the city of Jackson.
  - July 27 – A mass shooting at a Unitarian Universalist church in Knoxville leaves two dead and seven injured.
  - October 22 – A Tennessean and an Arkansan are arrested, foiling their plot to assassinate presidential candidate Barack Obama in Tennessee.
  - December 22 – The Kingston Fossil Plant coal ash spill, the largest coal ash disaster in US history, releases over a billion gallons of coal fly ash slurry next to the city of Kingston.

=== 2010s ===
- 2010
  - May 1–7 – Floods across Middle and West Tennessee, in particular the flooding of the Cumberland River in Davidson County, lead to 21 deaths.
  - November 2 – With governor Phil Bredesen term-limited, Bill Haslam defeated Mike McWherter in the 2010 gubernatorial election to become the 49th governor of Tennessee.
- 2011
  - April 27 – The 2011 Super Outbreak of tornados hits East Tennessee, in particular Greene County and the Chattanooga area, killing 35.
  - May 4-June 20 – The Mississippi River floods, impacting Dyersburg and Shelby County.
  - October 6 – Protests with the Occupy Nashville movement begin, part of the global Occupy movement opposed to social and economic inequality, leading to governor Haslam enacting a curfew at the state capital.
- 2014
  - November 4 – Winning every county, incumbent governor Bill Haslam defeats Charles Brown in the 2014 gubernatorial election.
  - November 4 – Voters approved Amendment 1, giving the state legislature broader authority to regulate abortion policy.
- 2015
  - July 16 – Mass shootings at a military recruiting center and U.S. Navy Reserve center in Chattanooga leave six dead and two injured.
  - December 23–25 – A tornado outbreak kills several people around Hardeman and Perry counties.
- 2016
  - November 28-December 9 – Wildfires in the Great Smoky Mountains, particularly in Pigeon Forge and Gatlinburg, leave 14 dead, 190 injured, and 17,900 acres burned, as one of the most destructive modern wildfires in the Eastern United States.
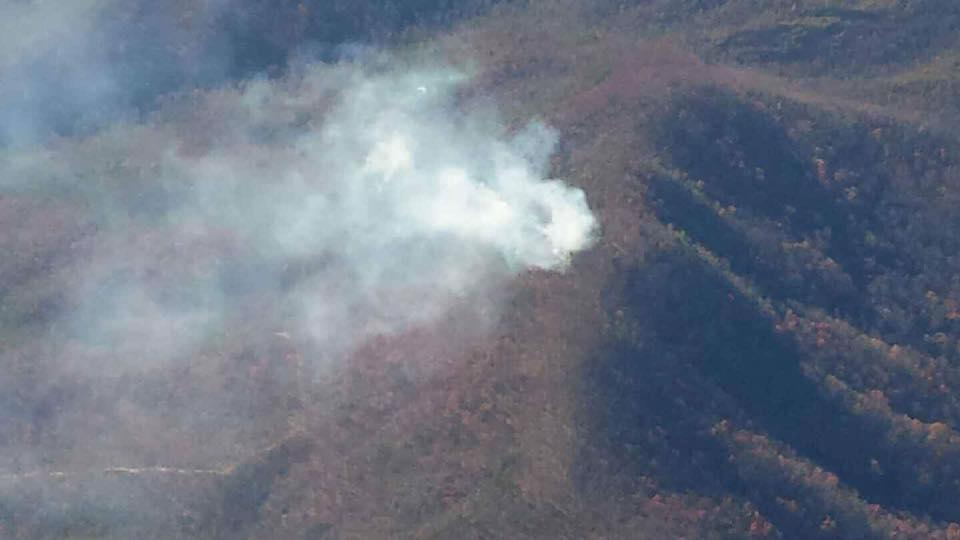
    Smoke from the 2016 Great Smoky Mountains wildfires
- 2017
  - September 24 – A mass shooting at a church in the Antioch neighborhood of Nashville leaves one dead and eight injured.
- 2018
  - April 22 – A mass shooting at a Waffle House in the Antioch neighborhood of Nashville leaves four dead and four injured.
  - November 6 – With governor Bill Haslam term-limited, Bill Lee defeats Karl Dean in the 2018 gubernatorial election to become the 50th governor of Tennessee. Marsha Blackburn defeats former Governor Phil Bredesen in the Senate election.

=== 2020s ===
- 2020
  - March 2–3 – A tornado outbreak causes 25 deaths and 309 injuries, primarily in Putnam and Davidson counties.
  - March 5 – Tennessee's first case of COVID-19 is confirmed in Williamson County, marking the start of the COVID-19 pandemic in Tennessee.
  - November 3, Bill Hagerty wins the senate election.
- 2022
  - Tennessee's population grew to over 7 million.
  - November 8, Bill Lee re-elected governor.
- 2023
  - March 27 – A mass shooting occurs at a private Presbyterian Church in America parochial school in Nashville, Tennessee, killing three children, three adults, and the perpetrator.
  - April 6 – The Tennessee House of Representatives votes on resolutions to expel three of its Democratic members, ostensibly for breaking the body's decorum rules by leading personal protests for gun reform on the House floor in the wake of the March 27 school shooting. The resolutions for the expulsions of Justin Jones and Justin Pearson pass and they are removed from office, while the resolution against Gloria Johnson fails and she is allowed to retain her seat.
- 2024
  - Construction of a new stadium for the Tennessee Titans began.
  - November 5, Marsha Blackburn re-elected senator .
- 2025
  - In January, a shooting at Antioch High School in Nashville resulted in the death of one student and the perpetrator's suicide; the incident sparked renewed debate over school security and gun access in Tennessee.
  - On 10 October, an explosion occurred at a military explosives handler in Hickman County, killing multiple workers and leaving over a dozen others unaccounted for as emergency agencies responded to the scene.
- 2026
  - In January, a large ice storm storm hits Tennessee. State authorities reported 29 fatalities related to the storm.
  - On August 25 Dolly Parton Died At the age of 80.

== See also ==
- List of Tennessee state legislatures
