= Charles Robertson Grant Deed =

The Charles Robertson Grant, also known more simply as the Watauga Grant, was a transaction for the sale of land by the Cherokee Nation to Charles Robertson. The transaction occurred at Sycamore Shoals on the Watauga River on March 19, 1775. The Charles Robertson Grant was for a large tract in what is now East Tennessee and Western North Carolina, some of which had been previously leased from the Cherokee.

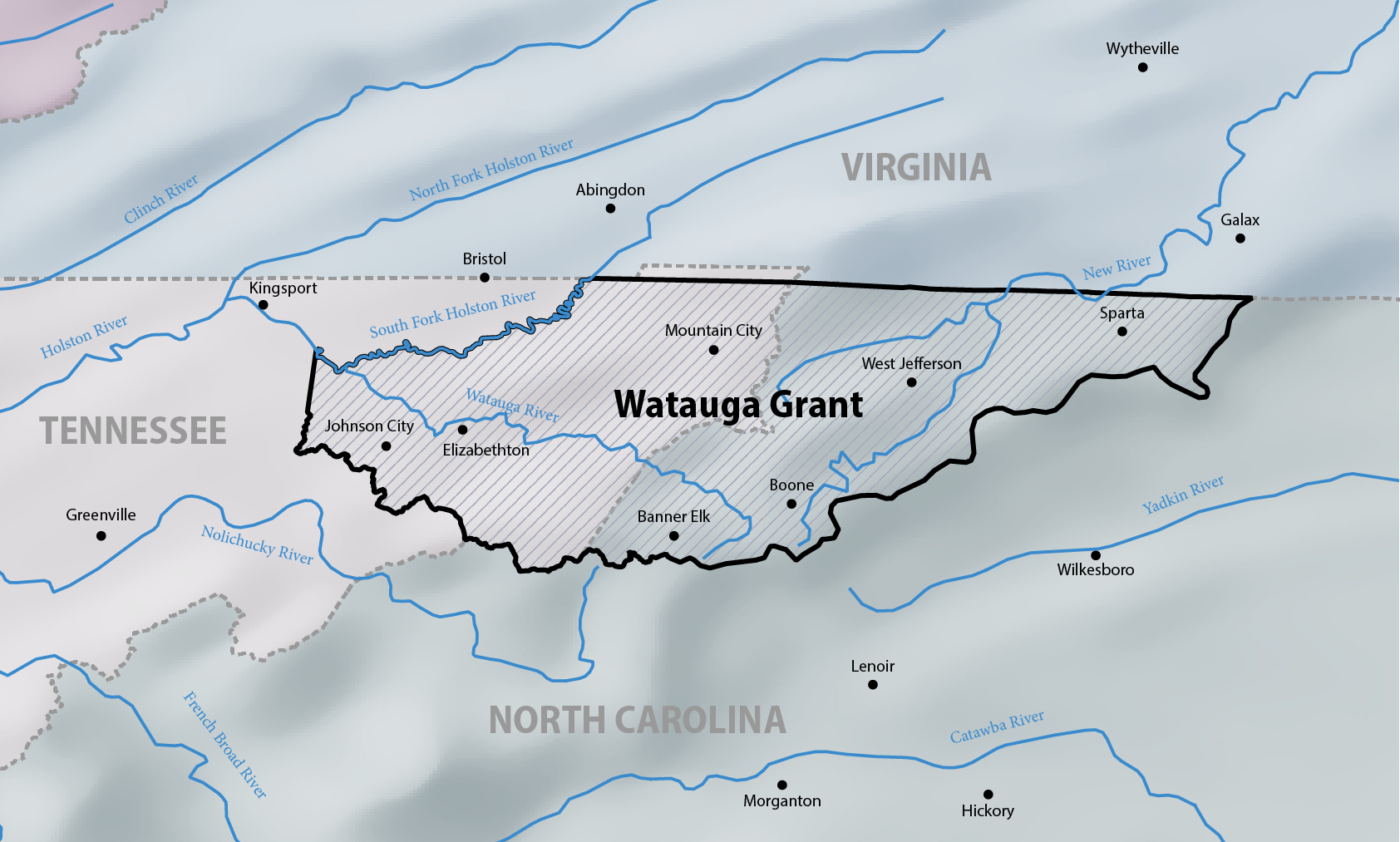
A map showing the boundaries of the 1775 Watauga or Charles Robertson Grant overlaid with present-day state borders and populated areas

== Location ==
The Charles Robertson Grant was one of five property transactions made at Sycamore Shoals in the present day city of Elizabethton, Tennessee. Collectively known as the Watauga Treaties the transactions resulted in the Great Grant Deed, the Path Grant Deed, two Jacob Brown Grant Deeds and the Charles Robertson Grant Deeds. The Great Grant provided for the sale of land in Central Kentucky to the Richard Henderson and Company and was transacted on March 17, 1775. The Path Grant provided for the sale of land in present day East Tennessee and Southwest Virginia and provided a secure path way into the Great Grant land in Kentucky. The Jacob Brown Grants provided for the sale of property included within the Nolichucky River watershed in present day Greene County Tennessee. The Robertson and Brown Grants clarified ownership of existing settlers south of the Treaty of Lochaber line and the Holston River

The Charles Robertson Deed resulted from what were early agreements with the Cherokee and other Native Americans for land west of the Allegheny Mountains. The Watauga Treaties were the beginning of the American Westward Expansion.

== The Watauga Settler Buyers ==
As Clerk who was appointed Trustee for the Watauga Association, Charles Robertson bought the property from the Cherokee for the sum of 2,000 British Pounds. Previously, the association had leased the property including the settlements from the Cherokee. The Charles Robertson purchase from the Cherokee was mirrored a few days later by Jacob Brown for the adjacent Nolichucky Grants.

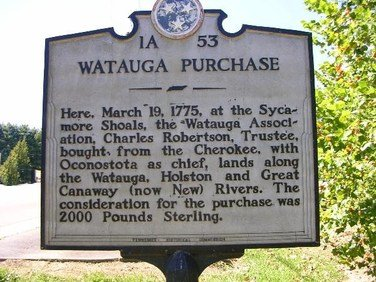
The Tennessee Historical Marker located at Sycamore Shoals in Elizabethton Tennessee describing the Watauga Association land purchase from the Cherokee by Charles Robertson in March 1775

As Trustee, Charles Robertson recorded the grant in the original ledger book. Subsequently, this ledger was used by James Smith who became clerk of the land office that opened in Ft Watauga on April 1, 1775. The ledger is known as "Old Book A". The Charles Robertson Deed is on Page 1. Later with the formal establishment of Washington County by North Carolina, the book was transferred to Jonesborough. The original book is said to reside in the original land office papers held by the North Carolina State Archives. A copy is in the custody of the Tennessee State Library and Archives. The property included was deeded to the present holders, lessors, who were now provided clear unequivocal title to the land.

On March 19, 1775, the day of the Charles Robertson Watauga purchase, 175 of the Watauga settlers petitioned the North Carolina Legislature to become a county. The petition indicated a need for government and court jurisdiction. The request went unheeded and another petition was sent more than a year later. This time, the petition was quite lengthy and to add emphasis, there were many more signers.

In August 1776, the Watauga settlers again petitioned North Carolina for formal recognition. There is no date on the petition but it was marked Received August 22, 1776. To emphasize desire and need, this petition is quite long and contains the signatures of 466 male Watauga settlers.

The petition notes the uncertainty and confusion of the Watauga settlers that resulted from the current law and the colonial government under which they might be governed. There was confusion as to where the line separating Virginia from North Carolina actually existed on the ground where they were living. The Donaldson Survey of 1772 established the line as latitude 36° 30' and a very precise point that was where the South Fork of the Holston river intersected with line at a point 6 miles upstream from the tip of the Long Island of the Holston.

Many historians treat the petition with short summations. The petition provides keen insight into the angst and thinking of the Watauga settlers. The petition provides an understanding of the place and time and should be read in its entirety. File:Petition to North Carolina By the Washington District.pdf – via Wikisource.The fact there are 466 signers on this second petition is not insignificant. The petitioners were very serious in their purpose.

== The Cherokee Sellers ==
In 1775, there were 64 Cherokee towns with a total population of less than 9,000 people known collectively as the Overhill, Middle Town and Lower Towns By the 1750s the Cherokee population stood at approximately 25,000. Twenty years later through open warfare with the relentlessly encroaching white population and by the ravaging effect of diseases carried by explorers and settlers the population had been reduced to less than 9,000.

The map "Cherokee-Creek Country 1760-1781" by Coulter-Swanton Indicates Holston River settlements and Ft Patrick Henry but no Cherokee habitations. In the Journal of Dr Thomas Walker entry for March 31, 1749 – 1750, he indicates discovery of abandoned Cherokee houses at the convergence of the north and south forks of the Holston River. He also noted a large abandoned fort downstream about four miles.

The Cherokee had abandoned the lands along the Holston, Watauga and Nolichucky rivers. Thus Oconistoto, Attacullicully & Savanuka were in effect selling property surplus to their needs. Having previously negotiated with the same settlers for the lease of the same property, it might be surmised that the Cherokee either did not recognize the difference between a lease and quitclaim sale, or the Cherokee elders were pleased to accept the second payment of 2,000 British pounds.

== The Watauga Grant Deed ==
The geographical extent of the Watauga Grant corresponds to the northeasternmost portion of present-day Tennessee and the northwesternmost portion of present-day North Carolina. The boundaries were described in Old Book A, Page 1, shown below in bold, as comprising the Watauga River watershed in present-day Tennessee and North Carolina, the portion of the New River watershed that falls within present-day North Carolina, and the area in present-day Tennessee south of the South Fork of the Holston River and east of present-day Kingsport, Tennessee.

Old Book A
Deed Book Page 1
This Indenture made this nineteenth day of March in the year of our Lord Christ one thousand seven hundred and seventy five Between Oconistoto Chief Warrior and first representative of the Cherokee Nation or tribe of Indians & Attacullaculy & Savanucah otherwise Coronoh for themselves and the rest of the whole nation being Aborigines and sole owners by occupation from the beginning of time of the Lands on the waters of Holston & Wataugah rivers & other Lands & Territories thereunto belonging of the one part and Charles Robertson of the Settlement of Wataugah of the other part Witnesseth, that the said Oconistoto for himself and the rest of the said Nation of Indians for and in consideration of two thousand pounds of Lawful money of Great Brittain to them in hand paid by the said Charles Roberson the receipt whereof the said Oconostoto and the whole nation do and for themselves and their whole tribe of people have granted bargained and sold aliened enfeoff'd releas'd and confirmed and by these presents do grant bargain sell enfeoff release and confirm unto him the said Charles Robertson his heirs and assigns forever all that tract territory or parcel of Land on the waters of Wataugah, Holston and great Conaway or New River Beginning on the south or south west side of Holston River six English Miles above the Long Island in said river thence a direct line over a So. Wt. course to the ridge which divides the waters of Wataugah from the waters of Nonachuckeh thence along the various courses of said ridge nearly a south east course to the blue ridge or line dividing North Carolina from the Cherokee Lands. Thence along the various courses of said ridge to the Virginia line thence West along the Virginia line to Holston river

Deed Book Page 2
The Deed obtained from the thence down the meanders of Holston river to the first station including all the waters of Wataugah part of the waters of Holston and the head branches of New river or great Canaway agreeable to the bounds aforesaid, and also the reversion & reversions remainder & remainders, rents and issues thereof and all the Estate right title Interest claim and demand whatsoever of them the said Oconistoto and the aforesaid whole band or tribe of people in and to the same premises & of in and to the every part and parcel thereof. To have and to hold the said message and territory and all the singular the premises above mentioned with the appurtenances unto the said Charles Roberson his heirs and assigns in severalty and tenants in common and not as Joint to the only proper use and behoof of the said Charles Robertson his heirs and assigns forever under the yearly rent of four pence or to beholden of the Chief Lords or Lords of the Fee of the premises by the rents and services therefore due and of right accustomed, and the said Oconistoto and the said Nation for themselves do covenant and grant to and with the said Charles Robertson his heirs and assigns that they the said Oconistoto and the rest of the said Nation of people now are lawfully and rightfully seized in their own right of a good sure perfect and absolute and indefeasible estate of Inheritance in fee simple of and in all and singular the said Messuage territory and premises above mentioned and of all & every part and parcel thereof with the appurtenances with out any manner of condition mortgage limitation of use or uses or other matter cause or thing to alter change charge or

Deed Book Page 3
Cherokees for the Wataugah Purchase determine the same and also that the Oconistoto and the aforesaid Nation now have good full power and lawful Authority in their own right to grand bargain & sell and convey the said messuage territory and premises above mentioned with the appurtenances unto the said Charles Robertson his heirs and assigns according to the true intent and meaning of these presents and also the said Charles Robertson his heirs and assigns shall and may from time to time and at all times hereafter peaceably and quietly have hold possess and enjoy all and singular the said premises above mentioned to be hereby granted with the appurtenances, without the trouble hindrance molestation interruption and denial of them the said Oconistoto and the rest or any of the said nation their heirs or assigns and of all and every other person and persons whatsoever claiming or to claim by power or under them or any of them; and lastly the said Oconistoto Atticullicully Savenuka otherwise Coronoh for themselves and in behalf of the whole nation and their heirs and all and every other person and persons and his and their heirs anything having or claiming in the said Messuage territory and persons above mentioned or any part thereof by power or under them shall and will at all times hereafter, at the request and costs of the said Charles Roberson his heirs or assigns make do and execute or cause or procure to be made done or executed all and every further and other lawful and reasonable grants, acts and appurtenances in the law whatsoever for the further better and the more perfect granting conveying and assuring of the

Deed Book Page 4
Deed Obtained from the Indians said premises hereby granted with the appurtenances unto the said Charles Robertson his heirs and assigns to the only proper use and behoof of the said Charles Roberson his heirs and assigns forever according to the true intent and meaning of these presents ratifying and confirming and allowing all and whatsoever he shall do in the premises. In Witness whereof the said Oconistoto Attacullicully & Savanuka other wise Coronoh for themselves and in behalf of the whole Nation hath here unto set their hands and affixed their seals the day and year first written.

Signed Sealed & delivered In presence of

John Sevier	Oconistoto & his mark (seal)
William Bailey Smith	Atticullicully C his mark (seal)
Jesse Benton	Tennessy Warrior X his mark (seal)
Tilmon Dixon	Willinawaugh # his mark (seal)
William Blevins	
Thomas Price	

Jos. Vann, (seal) Linquester

The Watauga settlers William Baily Smith, Tilman Dixon, and Thomas Price and the Cherokee Attaculla and Savanooko, and the Translator Joseph Vann also signed the Path Grant Deed.

== Actions by North Carolina ==
The Great Grant Deed article indicates that the entire proceedings at Sycamore Shoals were likely transactions by sellers with no right to sell and buyers with no right to buy. In the Charles Roberson transactions that statement turned out to be only half true. The Cherokee were certainly the aboriginal owners of the property along the Watauga. The Royal Proclamation of 1763 by King George III prohibited settlement of the lands west of the Alleghenies which formed the Eastern Continental Divide. Such lands were considered to be Indian Lands but not subject to sale to British Crown colonists.

A controversy that grew out of the Great Grant directly affected the people of the Watauga settlements. In anticipation of the various land transactions eventually made at Sycamore Shoals in March 1775, North Carolina Governor Martin issued a proclamation in February 1775 in opposition. Subsequently in accord with Virginia and the voices of the Watauga settlers demanding clarification of the boundaries, North Carolina nullified the Transylvania Colony and asserted sovereignty over the western territory. That western territory was declared to be the Washington District and included all of what is now Tennessee. This action formally transpired in November 1777. Along with the Great Grant and the Henderson Memorial to the commission requesting relief, the Watauga Treaty Grants of 1775 were ignored by the Virginia and North Carolina commissioners who were negotiating with the Cherokee at the Treaty of Long Island in July 1777.

Thus in a negative turn of events, the Charles Robertson purchase was found to be null and void.

As was noted in the Jacob Brown Grant Deeds article, the object of North Carolina when negotiating the Treaty of Long Island 1777 in nullifying the Charles Robertson Grant Deed was not to penalize the settlers. The object was to reach agreement with the Cherokee and to place the lands under recognized governmental control. Subsequently, in 1778, land offices were opened, and procedures established for the settlers to obtain permanent North Carolina sanctioned ownership and titled. To make the settler's land claim official, a warrant for a survey was issued by North Carolina, a survey was made and submitted with a grant application. On payment of 50 shillings per one hundred acres a grant for the land was issued. The deed was recorded in the Washington District office in what is known as Old Deed Book A. On formal establishment of Washington County, Old Deed Book A was abandoned with a new set of deed books still in existence.

== Sources ==
- Ramsey, J.G. M., The Annals of Tennessee, 1853, Steam Power Press of Charleston
- Skinner, Constance Lindsey, Pioneers of the Old Southwest, Public Domain, Chap VII
- Folmsbee Stanley J., Annotations Relating Ramsey's Annals of Tennessee to Present Day Knowledge. pp. 754, 755.
- Edmund L. Starling, History of Henderson County, Kentucky 1887, page 18
- Hamer, Philip M. Phd Tennessee A History 1675- 1932, The American Historical Society 1935, vol I page 67
- Pruitt, Albert Bruce. http://abpruitt.com/proctn.htm
- WIKISOURCE File:Petition to North Carolina By the Washington District.pdf. Wikisource.
- Walker, Dr. Thomas, Diary 1749-1750, Entry March 31
- USGS Topographical Map 1:25000 Boone Dam Quadrangle
- USGS Topographical Map 1:25000 Jonesborough
- USGS Topographical Map 1: 25000 Erwin
- Google Earth between Coordinates Latitude 36° 12' 16.19" North, Longitude 82° 27' 54.94" West to Latitude 36° 26' 05.39 North, Longitude 82° 26' 22.96" West
- Charles Robertson Deed, Tennessee State Library and Archives, http://cdm15138.contentdm.oclc.org/cdm/compoundobject/collection/tfd/id/466/rec/20
- Native American Footprints on the Land, https://www.wnchistory.org/smith-mcdowell-house/past-exhibits/the-native-american-footprint-on-the-land/
