= Jacob Brown Grant Deeds =

Transactions for the sale of land by the Cherokee Nation to Jacob Brown

The Jacob Brown Grant Deeds, also known more simply as the Nolichucky Grants, were transactions for the sale of land by the Cherokee Nation to Jacob Brown. The transaction occurred at Sycamore Shoals on the Watauga River on March 25, 1775. The Jacob Brown grants were for two large tracts along the Nolichucky River some of which had been previously leased from the Cherokee.

== Location ==
The grants are located along the Nolichucky River in what is now East Tennessee. The land is adjacent to the Charles Roberson or Watauga Grant made by the Cherokee a few days earlier.

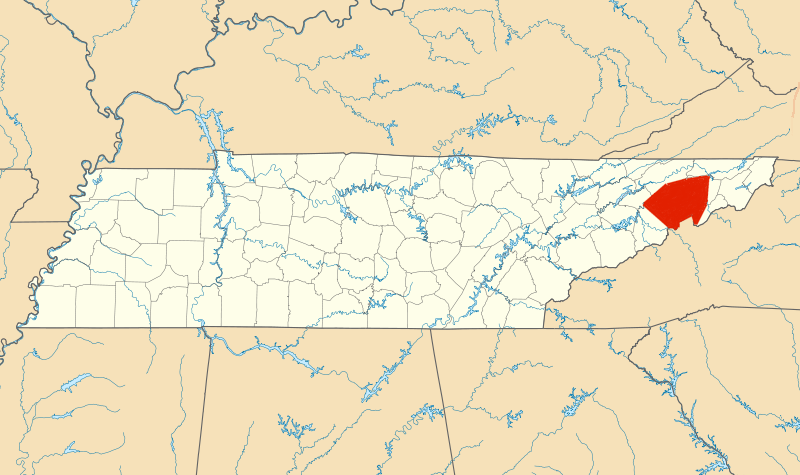
The Jacob Brown Grants lie within the water shed of the Nolichucky river in East Tennessee

The Nolichucky Grants were two of five property transactions made near present-day Elizabethton, Tennessee at the Sycamore Shoals of the Watauga River, collectively known as The Watauga Treaties. The Path Grant Deed was for lands in East Tennessee and Southwest Virginia needed by Richard Henderson & Co to permit free passage into Kentucky and the property of the Great Grant Deed. That transaction was concluded a few days earlier on March 17, 1775. The Charles Roberson Grant Deed and two Jacob Brown Grant Deeds clarified ownership of existing settlements.

Among the first agreements between Native Americans and the European settlers were the Watauga Treaties, which resulted in the Jacob Brown Deeds. The Watauga treaties were the beginning of the American westward expansion. Jacob Brown was a visionary who saw that providing land to colonial settlers would enable them to escape the confines of the British Crown.

== The Jacob Brown Leases ==
It is noted on the Tennessee Historical Marker in Greene County that in 1771 Jacob Brown came to the Nolichucky River and set up tents on the northern bank. From this location he conducted trade with the Cherokee. In 1772 he leased a tract of ground on the Nolichucky from the Cherokee. The consideration was said to be a horse load of goods. The exact boundaries of the lease are not known.

The lands on the Nolichucky were the fertile alluvial soil drained by the creeks flowing from the mountains. The valleys provided abundant game.

Although Jacob Brown was in fact one of the thirteen original commissioners of the Watauga Association it was because of the large lease that his properties were not included in the Charles Robertson Watauga Grant negotiated on March 19, 1775 at Sycamore Shoals. Brown had previously made a deed of conveyance to parts of the leased land to others, including one Richard Trivillian.

The lease is a term of legal art where by one party is granted the use of the property of another. The lease is a document stating the description of the property and the consideration paid. There is no permanent record of the Jacob Brown lease. Since there was no government through which there could be judicial enforcement, the concept is murky. Being a matter of law the formality of the term lease was not fully comprehended by the Cherokee but for the price paid they agreed not to bother Jacob Brown or those others settled upon the lands in question. The Cherokee in question did not have villages within roughly ninety five miles. However, they held aboriginal title and claimed the lands for hunting.

The Royal Proclamation of 1763 also had a bearing. Under the proclamation Jacob Brown was prohibited from purchasing lands beyond the mountain barrier. This prohibition and questions of sovereignty are described in the Great Grant Deed.

== The Jacob Brown Purchases ==
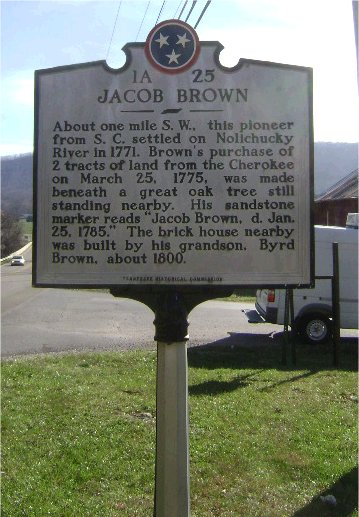
The Tennessee historical marker describing the Jacob Brown Grants is located on Tennessee Highway 81 at Thomas Bridge Road

In March 1775 there was a gathering at Sycamore Shoals on the Watauga River of some 600 settlers and 1,200 Cherokee to transact the sale of lands. The lands sold by the Cherokee to the Richard Henderson & Co are described in the Path Grant Deed and the Great Grant Deed. These lands were north of the Holston River in East Tennessee and Southwest Virginia and in Central Kentucky between the Cumberland and Kentucky rivers. The Holston river was generally taken to be the border between Virginia and North Carolina.

Taking advantage of the gathering, on March 25, 1775, 8 days after the signing of the Great Grant, Jacob Brown negotiated with the Cherokee to sell outright in Fee Simple the lands along the Nolichucky watershed in addition to and including that for which he held leases. The consideration in addition to the previous lease payment was 10 shillings. The Revolution against the Crown of England was underway and the prohibitions of the royal Proclamation of 1763 were seemingly no longer valid. The deed texts have survived.

=== Jacob Brown Purchase tract #1 ===
This indenture, made the 25th day of March 1775, between Oconostota, chief warrior and head prince, the Tenesay Warrior and Bread Slave Catcher, Attakillakulla, and Chehnesley, Cherokee chiefs of Middle and Lower settlements, of the one part, and Jacob Brown, of Nonachuchy, of the other part – consideration ten shillings- a certain tract or parcel of land lying on Nonachuchy River, as follows: Beginning at the mouth of a creek called Great Limestone, running up the meanders of said creek and the main fork of the creek to the ridge that divides Wataugah and Nonachuchy, joining the Wataugah purchase, from thence up the dividing ridge that divides the waters of the Nonachuchy and Wataugah, and thence to the head of Indian Creek, where it joins the Iron Mountain, thence down the said mountain to Nonachuchy River, thence across said river including the creeks of said river, thence down the side of the Nonachuchy Mountain against the mouth of Great Limestone, thence to the beginning.

In the presence of

Samuel Crawford	Oconostota
Jesse Denham	The Tenesay Warrior
Moses Crawford	The Bread Slave Catcher
Zachary Isbell	Attacullaculla
	Chenesley

Witness the Warriors – Thomas Bulla, Joseph Vann, Richard Henderson

=== Jacob Brown Purchase Tract #2 ===
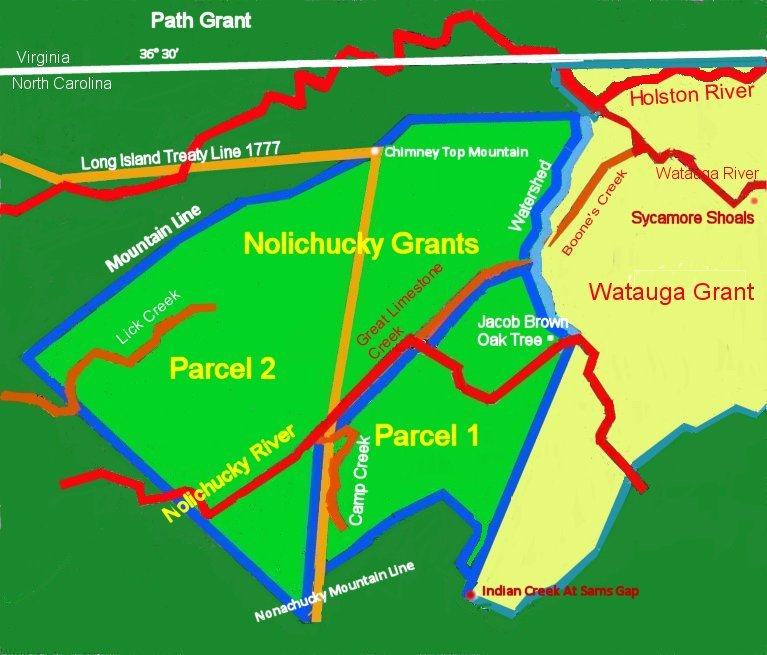
The map depicts the Jacob Brown Grants within the watershed of the Nolichucky river in East Tennessee

A tract of land lying on Nonachuchy River, below the mouth of Big Limestone, on both sides of said river, bounded as follows, joining the rest of said Brown's purchase. Beginning on the south side of said river, below the old fields that lie below the said Limestone, on the north side of Nonachuchy Mountain, at a large rock; thence north 32 deg. West to the mouth of Camp Creek, on the south side of said river; thence across said river; thence north-west to the dividing ridge between Lick Creek and Watauga or Holston; thence up the dividing ridge to the rest of said Brown's land; thence down the main fork of Big Limestone to its mouth; thence crossing the river a straight course to Nonachuchy Mountain; thence down the said mountain to the beginning.

None of those shown as witnesses appear on the Path Grant Deed or the Charles Roberson Grant deed. Shown as "Witness the warriors" were Joseph Vann and Richard Henderson, both of whom were present at the signing of the Path Grant Deed and the Great Grant Deed. Richard Henderson was the purchaser of both properties and Joseph Vann, who was titled Linquester, was the official translator for the Crown and considered trustworthy by both parties. Joseph Vann who was noted present on the Path Grant Deed and the great Grant deeds as well was a half Indian and had served as interpreter for Cameron the British Agent to the Cherokee.

The presence of Henderson and Vann yield credence to the belief that the Brown Grants were drawn and signed at Sycamore Shoals. In the diary of Richard Henderson, for the date of March 25, 1775 there is no mention of his presence under an oak tree on the Nolichucky that was some twenty miles to the southwest of Sycamore Shoals on the Watauga River.

Thus, the caption on the Tennessee Historical Marker noted above commemorating Jacob Brown likely confuses the event of the lease trading in 1772 and the purchase trading in March 1775. It was the bargaining for the lease of the Nolichucky property in 1772 with the Cherokee that likely took place under the Big Oak Tree near Jacob Brown's trading post. The Warrant #652 drawn by John Carter on April 22, 1779 some four years after the deed was signed, indicated the treaty was held on the property at the mouth of Cherokee Creek.

The Jacob Brown Grant Deed was somewhat hastily drawn-up, after learning of the other successful transactions, especially that of the Charles Robertson grant, there was not time for an accurate survey while all the parties were assembled and in the mood for business. Thus a description for the property was developed based on geographical features of mountains, creeks, the Nolichucky River and a watershed. This procedure for formally describing North Carolina boundaries was the approved method at the time.

Generally, the Jacob Brown properties that include both parcel #1 and parcel #2 are bounded on the north by the ridgeline including the present day Fodder Stack and the highpoint Chimney Top Mountain ridge. This ridgeline separates the drainage of the Holston river on the north from the Nolichucky river on the South. The grant southern boundary are the mountains defining the Tennessee/ North Carolina border and separating the drainage of the Nolichucky river from that of the French Broad river. On the eastern extremity the boundary is the ridge crest that defines the watershed between the Nolichucky and the Watauga rivers extended southward from a point near the present day Boone Dam to the readily definable point of the head of Indian Creek that is today Sam's Gap. On the west the grant line definition is not so clearly defined but can be taken as a line northward from the high point on the state line above the present day Hot Springs NC northward to the western end of the aforementioned Chimney Top ridge line.

== Actions by North Carolina ==
The Great Grant Deed article indicates that the entire proceedings at Sycamore Shoals were likely transactions by sellers with no right to sell and buyers with no right to buy. In the Jacob Brown transactions that statement turned out to be only half true. The Cherokee were certainly the aboriginal owners of the property along the Nolichucky. The royal proclamation of King George on October 3, 1763 prohibited settlement of the lands west of the Alleghenies. Such lands were considered to be Indian lands but not subject to sale to British crown colonists.

There was a controversy that grew out of the Great Grant but directly affected Jacob Brown. In anticipation of the various land transactions eventually made at Sycamore Shoals, North Carolina Governor Martin issued a proclamation in February 1775 in opposition. Subsequently, in accord with Virginia and the voices of the Watauga settlers demanding clarification of the boundaries, North Carolina nullified the Transylvania Colony and asserted sovereignty over the western territory. That western territory was declared to be the Washington district and included all of what is now Tennessee. This action formally transpired in November 1777. Along with the Great Grant and the Henderson Memorial to the commission, the Jacob Brown and Watauga Grants of 1775 were ignored by the Virginia and North Carolina commissioners who were negotiating with the Cherokee at the Treaty of Long Island in July 1777.

Thus in a negative turn of events, the Jacob Brown purchases were found to be null and void.

To put subsequent events in context, it should be remembered that by July 1777, there was a war of revolution in process. The large tracts of the Great Grant and the Path Grant were mostly the business of Virginia with North Carolina being secondary. As noted in the Great Grant Deed, the serious inquiry that took place in the form of hearings and formal proceedings with depositions and evidence were conducted by Virginia. The formal nullification by Virginia was finally made in December 1778.

At the Treaty Of Long Island on July 20, 1777, Col Avery, the commissioner from North Carolina, responding to a speech by the Old Raven of Chota, also known as Savanooko otherwise Coronok, lectured the Cherokee and the settlers on the problems of the sovereign resulting from the out of other treaty dealings for land. The sales and leasing of land beyond the existing treaty bounds resulted in war and bloodshed of settlers and Cherokee. Part of the treaty understanding must be that all such transactions beyond the new boundary to be established must cease. Although payment for the lands in question had been made previously and sometimes more than once, and although some of the commissioners declared no other payment should be made, Col Christian pronounced a payment for the Cherokee hunting grounds of 200 breeding cattle and 100 sheep. Thus, with cattle, the need to hunt was reduced. Thus it was that Jacob Brown lost title to much of the lands previously purchased at the Watauga Treaty of March 1775.

Since the purpose of the treaty by the sovereign North Carolina was to create peace and establish a border, it was not the intent to take away the settled lands the treaty was meant to protect. Thus it was that on November 27, 1778, one John Carter of Washington County now securely a part of North Carolina, issued the File:Brown Warrant 562.pdf – via Wikisource.noted above to the county surveyor to survey a tract of 640 acres on the Nolichucky River at the mouth of Cherokee Creek. Subsequently, the county surveyor surveyed the land and preparedFile:Brown Warrant 562 Survey.pdf – via Wikisource.. The survey resulted in Grant 790 from North Carolina for the noted 640 acres.

Jacob Brown was recipient of two other grants by North Carolina. The first, also in 1779 was recorded as Grant 995 for 640 acres. The second was somewhat later for 200 acres entered as Grant 1156. The total of all the grants by North Carolina to Jacob Brown was 1,480 acres. The three properties were adjacent and along the Nolichucky river. Thus it was that Jacob Brown obtained formal title to the lands he had settled on the Nolichucky River.

== Epilogue ==
At a much later date, on May 6, 1784 Jacob Brown petitioned the State of North Carolina for the reimbursement of money paid by him to the Cherokee in 1775 for property that was effectively taken by North Carolina and sold to the same people to whom he sold the property but was never paid. File:Jacob Brown Petition 2.pdf – via Wikisource.

Jacob Brown Petition to the North Carolina Assembly

May 10, 1784

To the honorable the General assembly of the State of North Carolina

The memorial of Jacob Brown humbly showeth that in the year 1775 your memorialist for the valuable consideration of nearly two thousand pounds specie purchased of the Cherokee Indians a large tract of country adjoining the waters of Nole Chucky; part of which be at different periods sold out to persons desirous of becoming adventurers and settling there, with a desire of reimbursement himself by such sales for the monies he had actually expended in effecting the purchase; but to his great loss And disappointment on the Assembly passing an act granting a right of preemption to the first improvers of the land in that county Those persons who had before purchased of your memorialist not only actually refused to pay him the consideration money back but entered the lands by them formerly purchased of your memorialist in the land office of the state. These together with many other unhappy circumstances oblige your memorialist to make application to your honorable body, and to request you will be pleased to submit the consideration of this matter to aforementioned when he does not doubt to be able to represent his case through them to the assembly In such a point of occur, as to induce the legislature to take same action for his relief and the promise And your petition shall Pray

May 6, 1784 Jacob Brown

Brown was by then knowledgeable of the petition of Richard Henderson and the subsequent grant of 1783 by North Carolina of 200,000 acres as acknowledgement for his leadership and actions in pioneering the opening of the territory. Unlike the situation described in the Great Grant Deed the petition of Jacob Brown was received by the North Carolina Assembly but refused.

== See also ==
- Path Grant Deed
- Great Grant Deed
- Atacullaculla
- Sycamore Shoals
- Watauga Association

== Sources ==
- Ramsey, J. G. M. (1853). The annals of Tennessee. Johnson City, TN: Overmountain Press. p. 110. ISBN 1570720916.
- Henderson, Archibald (2 August 2019). The Conquest of the Old Southwest. HardPress. ISBN 978-1406923094.
- Henderson, Archibald (1 January 1931). "The Treaty of Long Island of Holston, July, 1777". The North Carolina Historical Review. 8 (1): 55–116. JSTOR 23516001.
- Hamer, Philip. "Tennessee A History 1675- 1932". The American Historical Society. 1: 71.
- Skinner, Constance (April 1919). Pioneers of the Old Southwest.
- Price, Henry R. "Melungeons: The Vanishing Colony of Newman's Ridge" American Studies of Association 1966 citing Overton's Supreme Court records Volume II 1814, page 412
- Jacob Brown petition of May 4, 1784, https://en.wikisource.org/wiki/File:Jacob_Brown_Petition_.pdf
- Hallmark, Linda Hicks "Journal of Richard Henderson 1775" Henderson County Historical and Genealogical Society 2009, page 5
- North Carolina Archives Land Patent Book 79, page 149, Grant 790 22 Apr 1779
- North Carolina Archives Land Patent Book 79, Page 284, Grant 995 14 Jan 1793
- North Carolina Archives Land Patent Book 83, Page 389, Grant 1156 20 Dec 1780
