= Path Grant Deed =

The Path Grant Deed is a document regarded as a first step toward the American westward migration across the Appalachian Mountains, resulting from negotiations at Sycamore Shoals in March 1775. The land acquired within the boundaries of the Path Grant allowed Daniel Boone to develop the Wilderness Road free from attack or claims by the Cherokee. The Path Grant was recorded on November 15, 1794, by the Hawkins County, Tennessee registrar in Deed Book #1, pages 147-151

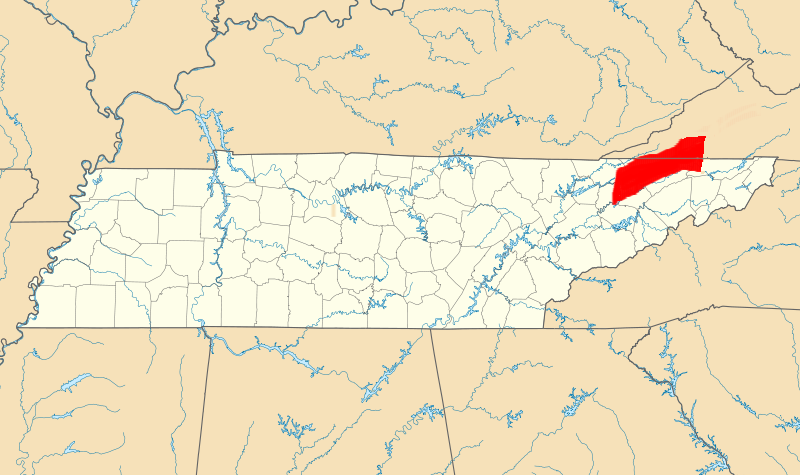
The Path Grant lands are located in North East Tennessee and South West Virginia

== Notes on the Path Deed Elements and Structure ==
The Path Grant deed is an indenture conveying a tract of property in Northeast Tennessee and Southwest Virginia known as the Path Grant from/by the Cherokee people to nine individuals collectively known as Richard Henderson and company. The indenture was drawn on an unstated day in March 1775 and recorded on November 15, 1794. The document is said to be the Path Deed because it represents the sale of land that is a route to an even larger tract of ground known as the Great Grant or the Transylvania Purchase. Were it not for the Path, it would not be possible to travel to the Great Grant without passing or trespassing on Cherokee land. In the Hawkins County Office of the Registrar of Deeds, it is referred to as "The Indian Deed"

The negotiations and transaction took place in March 1775 at the Sycamore Shoals of the Watauga river known as the Fort Watauga. The date of the signing and conveyance of the Great Grant is thought to be March 17, 1775. In addition to the Great Grant Deed, three other grants were made by the Cherokee to the Richard Henderson & company and other purchasers noted on the deeds. These are known as the Path Grant Deed, the Charles Robertson Grant Deed for the Watauga settlements and the Jacob Brown Grant Deeds for the Nolichucky settlements.

Photo of the recorded Path Grant Deed, book 1, page 147 Hawkins County, Tennessee Registrar of Deeds

The Path GrantPath grant – via Wikisource. was recorded on November 15, 1794, at the Hawkins county registrar but the date was omitted. It was filled in as 17 by another hand at a later date. In the absence of the deeds for the Watauga and Nolichucky grants, the persons to whom the property was conveyed is not known. There is evidence that the three minor grants were made on days immediately subsequent to the Great Grant date. March 17, 1775 might be a day or so early. For record purposes, the actual date is now fixed as March 17.

The drafter of the Path Deed structured the document by using elements or clauses as the building blocks. These clauses were part of deeds drafted at the time and are in use to the present. The clauses in conventional order are the parties clause, the recital, the testatum or consideration clause, The habendum or tenants in common clause, the parcels clause, the tenatum, the redendum clause, the warranty, the covenants and the testimonium.

=== The Parties Clause ===
The grantors, the conveying parties, were represented by three chiefs of the Cherokee's being Alla Cullocullah, Oconistoto, and Savanooko, being the representatives appointed by the warriors and other head men on behalf of the whole nation.

The grantees were Richard Henderson, Thomas Hart, Nathan Hart, John Williams, John Lutterell, William Johnson, James Hagg (Hogg), David Hart and Leonard Bullock, all said to be of the province of North Carolina. These nine individuals are the same that are noted as being pardners in the Transylvania Co agreement dated January 1775.

=== The Recital Clause ===
The grantors are said to be in accordance with current law, to hold the aboriginal title and sole owners since the beginning of time. That is, the Cherokee nation owns the property and has the right to sell it. The property owned is described as all that south of the Ohio River from the mouth of the Tennessee River north and east to the mouth of the Canaway River. The south eastern boundary is the treaty point that lies Holston River six miles east of the Long Island.

=== The Testatum or Consideration ===
The Cherokee received ten thousand pounds lawful money of Great Britain in consideration for the sale of the lands.

=== The Habenum or Tenants in Common clause ===
The afore mentioned Richard Henderson, Thomas Hart, Nathan Hart, John Williams, John Lutterell, William Johnson, James Hagg (Hogg), David Hart and Leonard Bullock are spelled out and their respective ownership shares are defined. They are Tenants in Common and not Joint Tenants. The joint tenancy title passes to heirs and assigns on the death of the person noted.

=== The Parcels Clause ===
The parcel being granted/conveyed is described in accordance with North Carolina law current at the time

The South Eastern corner is the only corner point of the Path Grant that can be established with certainty. That point is on the Donelson survey line on the Holston river six miles east of the Long Island. It can be positively located as being the point where the Holston River intersects with the parallel of latitude at 36° 30'.

The parcel boundary then follows the treaty line northeasterly until it meets the line of Powell Mountain curving easterly to a point on the Donelson Survey at the Big Stone Gap. The boundary then trends southwesterly until the end of the Powell Mountain ridge line. The course then extends southerly to the south west corner on the Holston River. The point where it intersects the river is thought to be the current intersection of the Hawkins, Hamblen and Grainger, Tennessee county lines. The boundary then follows the Holston river northeasterly to the point where the river meets the Virginia line of 36° 30' and along that line to the starting point on the treaty line.

The messuage includes not only the land described but all buildings and improvements. The word messuage is a term of art used by drafters of deeds to make note of the fact that all improvements, buildings and structures are conveyed along with the land.

=== The Tenatum ===
The Cherokee give up the right to the grant and all rights are transferred to have and to hold by Richard Henderson and Co.

=== The Redendum ===
Curiously the grant was in effect a sale of the described lands but the Cherokee were to receive a yearly rent of 4 pence. The deed format at the time provides for the redendum and the rent was apparently set at a very low amount.

=== The Warranty ===
The sale is made in fee simple with no conditions mortgage or limit on the use or water course.

=== The Covenants ===
The grantees shall have peaceable use of the grant with no molestation or hindrance by the Cherokee. The Cherokee will have no claims on the grant.

=== The Testimonium ===
The indenture states that the Cherokee have true and lawful attorneys being Joseph Martin and John Farror who are presumed to have approved the language of the deed. The deed was signed by Joseph Vann, Linquester, who was the Royal Interpreter for the crown.

The document is signed, sealed and delivered as marked by the three chiefs noted as Alla Cullocullah, Oconistoto, and Savanooko otherwise Coronok.

The marks are witnessed by Wm. Bailey Smith, George Lumpkin, Thos Houghton, Caselton Brooks, John Bacon, Tilman Dixon, Valentine Servy, and Thomas Price.

== Analysis ==
=== The Description Of The Grant ===
To grasp the scope of the Path Grant, it can be considered as a five sided irregular polygon lying along the valleys of the Clinch and Holston Rivers.

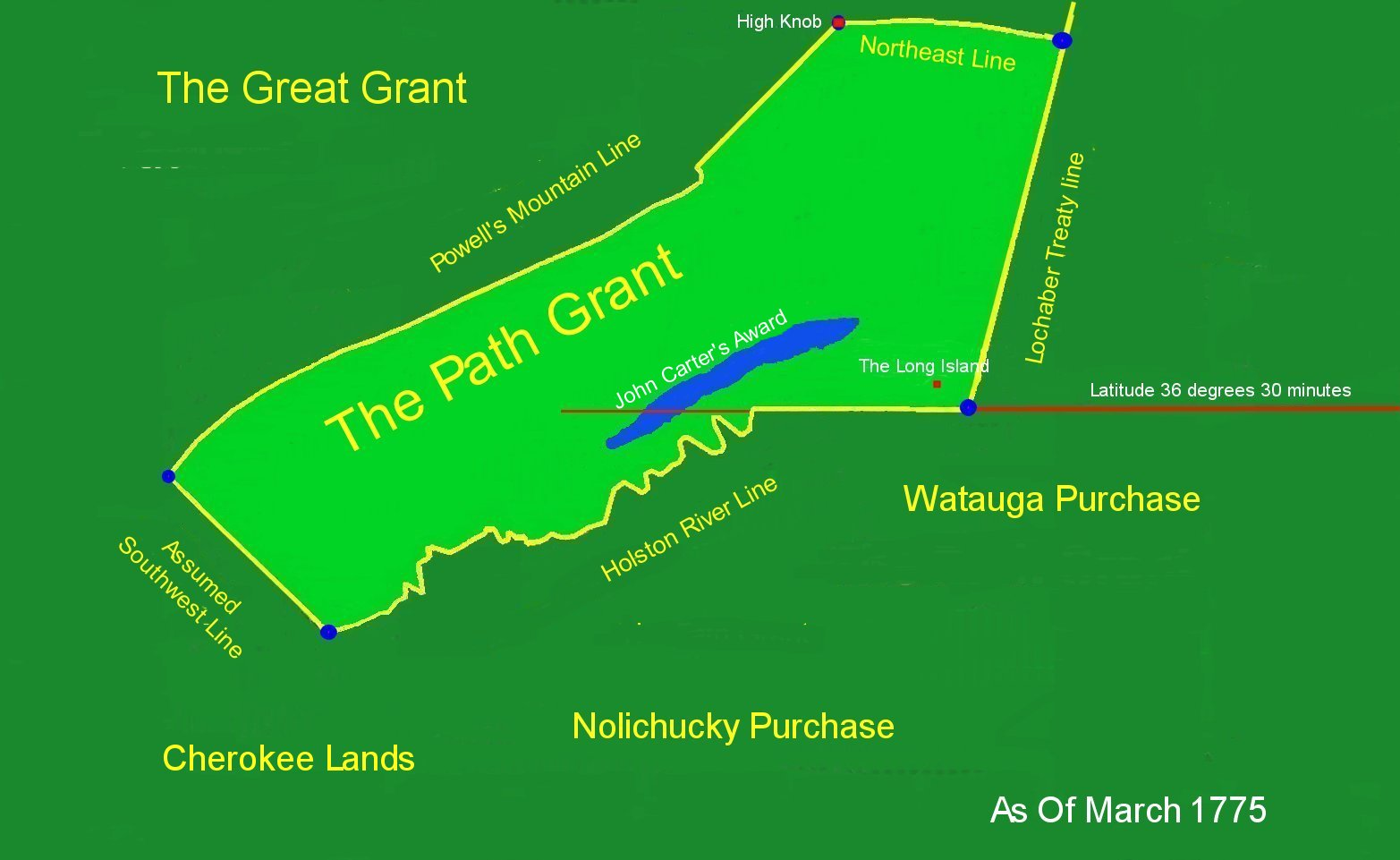
The graphic is a map of the property described in the Path Grant Deed

The long southerly boundary is the Holston River. The long northerly boundary is Powell Mountain ridge line that lies adjacent to a section of the Great Grant boundary and the Powell River valley leading to Cumberland Gap. That is to say, a portion of the Path Grant long Powell Mountain boundary is contiguous with the Great Grant boundary. The Wilderness Road envisioned by Daniel Boone began at the Holston River settlements at the present day Kingsport Tennessee, traversed up into Virginia through the Moccasin Gap of Clinch Mountain and thence across Powell Mountain to the Powell River valley. The Path Grant provided ownership transfer of the contested Holston River settlements and the Cherokee lands that must be crossed to reach the Powell River valley and the Great Grant lands.

When the description of the Path Grant is considered it seems somewhat vague except for one point specifically described. That point is on the Holston River six miles east of the Long Island, where Holston River crosses the Virginia line.

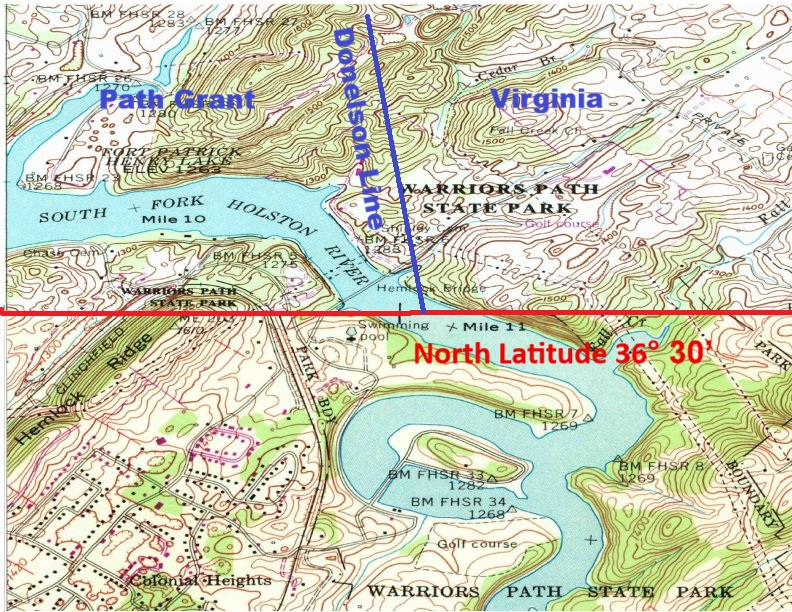
The Red line is the Latitude 36° 30' line NC/Va border extended west by the Donelson Survey. The Blue line is the Donelson Survey Line. The point of intersection in the middle of the Holston River is 6 miles upstream from the Long Island of the Holston. It is the corner of both the Path Grant and the Watauga Purchases of March 1775.

The Treaty of Lochaber in 1771 established the point in question and was made as part of the Donelson survey establishing a revised western border for the Virginia Colony. A survey was made by Col. Donelson and the Cherokee Chief Attakullakulla that established the survey line from the point on the North Carolina/ Virginia border via across the Clinch Mountain, the Powell Mountain and the Cumberland Mountain thence along the Kentucky and Ohio rivers to the mouth of Kanawha river at Point Pleasant. That is the same set of points and the line noted in the Path Grant Deed and the Great Grant Deed recital.

The point six miles from the Long Island is thus not dependent on how to measure six miles on a meandering river but is fixed by the river and the Latitude 36° 30'. Today that point is fixed as 36° 30' north latitude 82° 29' west longitude. The point is the center of the Holston River that is now Fort Patrick Henry Lake within the boundary of Warriors Path State Park. There is no structure or other man made feature marking the point. The present day Virginia/Tennessee line is north of this point and no longer 36° 30' north latitude.

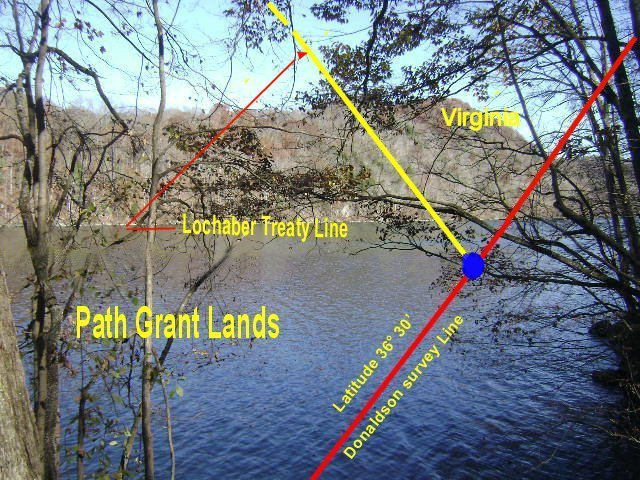
The Lochaber Treaty point shown is on the Holston River where it intersects the parallel of 36° 30' north latitude. The point is 6 miles upstream from the Long Island of the Holston and is within the current boundaries of Warrior's Path State Park near Kingsport, Tennessee. At this location, The Holston River is the Tennessee Valley Authority Fort Patrick Henry Reservoir. The point is approximately 200 yards upstream from the Hemlock Bridge. The Yellow Treaty Line extends to the Ohio River at the mouth of the Kanawha River at Point Pleasant West Virginia. The red line is looking due east along latitude 36° 30'

Additionally, the Lochaber Treaty point is not to be confused with a second intersection of the Holston river and the parallel of latitude 36° 30' further down stream and also noted in the Path Grant.

It is considered not possible to determine the polygon's short southwestern boundary line with certainty. A precise description was finessed by the negotiators with 14 words. "beginning on the Holston River where the courses of Powell Mountain crosses the same"

The line is said to follow the course of Powell Mountain to the Holston river. The course of Powell Mountain however does not intersect the Holston river.

When considered with the boundary of the Great Grant, the south western boundary becomes apparent.

The Path Grant short southwestern boundary is an extension of the Great Grant line extending from the southern end of Powell Mountain to a point just west of Cumberland Gap. That point is the current intersection of the borders of Virginia, Kentucky and Tennessee. The complete line for both grants thus extends from the intersection of the three counties on the Holston River as noted above northward to the point of intersection of three states on Cumberland Mountain just west of the Cumberland Gap.

A major route, referred to often as the Great War Path, traverses northeasterly through the Holston River Valley. At Bean Station, Tennessee junction, a trail extends northward across Clinch Mountain at Bean's Gap and onward to the Cumberland Gap. It includes the important way point and junction Bean's Station. That route is an alternate Path into the Cumberland Gap and Great Grant lands.

Similarly, the short Northern polygon boundary is not described with certainty. The line northward is on the Lochaber treaty line to the top ridge of Powell Mountain. The top ridge is presumed to be the ridge line at Big Stone Gap on the Donelson Survey.

Although some of the description is somewhat vague, some is quite specific. The course of Holston river as it meanders is the polygon's long southern line until it strikes the extension of the Lochaber Treaty survey line. The line then follows that 36° 30' Donelson's survey line to the point 6 miles from Long Island (Tennessee). By ceasing to follow the Holston river to the treaty line point some land south of the river was included in the Path Grant. Until March 1775 deed date, land south of the Holston river in the vicinity was unsettled and was Cherokee. The most immediate land that comes to view on the map today is The Long Island of The Holston River. The Long Island was important, even sacred to the Cherokee. This very specific line included in a deed with other very long and nonspecific lines makes it a very important departure from the geographically defined borders. The Cherokee sold the Long Island as a part of the Path Grant. If that is the reason, then Dragging Canoe's opposition justification takes on merit.

The long northern boundary of the polygon is the ridge line of Powell Mountain from its beginning on the south end to the high point at High Knob.

=== The Reason For The Path Grant ===
The purpose of the 9 man syndicate that was Henderson and Co was to purchase the lands of the Great Grant known as the Transylvania Colony from the Cherokee. Those lands are located within what is now Kentucky and Middle Tennessee. The syndicate needed a way, a route, a path into those Transylvania Colony lands. At that time, in 1775, the western border of Virginia extended down the Holston River Valley to the noted point on the south fork of the Holston River that was 6 miles up stream from the Long Island. At that point the land to the west was owned by the Cherokee.

The route down the Holston River valley was easily traversed. There were actually settlers, perhaps illegal settlers, living adjacent or nearby to the Long Island. What was needed was a route from this location to the Transylvania lands. That route was across Cherokee lands and subject to all sorts of possible problems with the Cherokee. There was a need to secure that route and the method was to purchase those lands in addition to the Great Grant Transylvania Colony lands.

The syndicate hired Daniel Boone to survey and develop the route. The route is known presently as the Wilderness Road. That path began at what is now Kingsport Tennessee, north across the North Fork of the Holston into present day Virginia, through the Moccasin Gap of Clinch Mountain, across the Clinch River and thence to Powell mountain where the Transylvania colony lands began. The result was the Path Grant that secured not only the route to Transylvania colony lands but the Holston River settlements and other settlements on the Clinch River.

=== Events at the Watauga Treaty Gathering ===
The parties, 1,200 Cherokee and more than 600 whites, gathered at Sycamore Shoals in March 1775 to negotiate the sale of much of the land that is now Kentucky and which is the subject of the Great Grant Deed. It was necessary to hold a second negotiation for land from the Holston River settlements to the Powell Valley to permit unmolested access to the Great Grant lands. That negotiation resulted in the Path Grant. On March 19, 1775, after the negotiations with the Henderson Co, the lease holders for the Watauga settlements around Sycamore Shoals purchased forever from the Cherokee Nation their leaseholds and Jacob Brown purchased his leasehold for the Nolichucky settlements. John Carter and Robert Lucas purchased the recently acquired Carter's Valley from the Richard Henderson Co. Others say the Carter property was awarded as payment for damages resulting from the Cherokee attack and burning of his Carter's valley store The result of this series of transactions transferred most of upper east Tennessee from Cherokee ownership to the settlers.

A very good and detailed account of all events pertaining to the gathering at the Fort Watauga and the various grants may be found at web books The Conquest of the Old Southwest.

=== The Deed Map ===
The line of 36° 30' north latitude was established as the Virginia/Carolina border by the king of England in the Carolina Charter of 1655. Generally, the Path Grant boundaries include the land laying between Powell Mountain on the north and the Holston river on the south. The land includes the Clinch River valley and the Holston River Valley. The various corner points and lines can be easily located on Google Earth.

=== The Consideration For The Grant ===
Prior to the gathering and negotiations, "chief Atta kulla-kulla, a young Buck and a squaw" journeyed to North Carolina to view the goods. Their report was favorable and perhaps exaggerated the wealth to be gained from the sale. The payment in valuation of 10,000 British Pounds was made in both silver and goods. The description of goods for the Path Grant is said to consist of "two thousand weight of leather in goods".

The potential acquisition of such abundance of unavailable goods proved to be adequate motivation for the chiefs and their people to overcome the opposition of those opposed to the sale of their lands. There is thus some ambiguity between the language of Great Grant and Path Grant deeds and the historical record. The consideration in both the Great Grant and the Path Grant deeds is said to be 10,000 British pounds. The consideration for the Path Grant is said to be two thousand weight of leather in goods. It can be deduced that there was one payment for both grants totaling 10,000 pounds in money and goods and a separate sweetening of two thousand weight of leather. The research does not yield an unambiguous certainty for the total.

=== The Opposition of Dragging Canoe ===
When Dragging Canoe made his speech, it can be argued he was not especially opposed to the sale of the lands around what is now Frankfort or Louisville or even Nashville. Dragging Canoe was opposed to selling the lands along the Holston and Watauga and Nolichucky rivers of East Tennessee. He was opposed to the sale of the Long Island of the Holston. He was opposed to the sale of the lands that were the East Tennessee settlements.

The basis for that argument is his subsequent action. Dragging Canoe did not lead a military campaign to settlements in Kentucky, he led his forces to the Island Flats of the Holston. Old Abram led a second force to attack the nearby Watauga settlement. One wonders if had they not split their force in a two pronged attack if history would have taken a different course. Had their combined forces prevailed in two engagements, there would have been no force to defeat Patrick Ferguson at Kings Mountain and change the course of the Revolution.

On the day of the signing, Dragging Canoe pointed to the west and said " A dark cloud hangs over that land known as the bloody grounds" Dragging Canoe did not accept the Path Grant Covenants clause noted above.

=== Names of Signatory Chiefs ===
The Cherokee Path Grant Deed Signers....."Alla Cullocullah, Oconistoto, and Savanooko otherwise Coronok."

The signer Alla Cullocullah is known in modern times as Attakullakulla, Little Carpenter

The signer Oconistoto is known in modern times as Oconostota. Oconostota and Attakullakulla were cousins and principle chiefs. Oconostota was also Attakullakulla's father in law,

The signer Savanooko otherwise Coronok is known in modern times as Kalanah Savanukah of Chota, the Raven of Chota. "Some historians believe be was Oconostota's nephew, while others stated he married Oconostota's sister. He served as Oconostota's advisor in the second half of the eighteenth-century."

Although not a signer, Dragging Canoe, aka Tsi'yu-gunsini, played an important historical role in Path Deed related events. He was the son of Attakullakulla and nephew of Oconostota. He was cousin to Nancy Ward who also played a part in events resulting from the granting of the Path deed.
