= Great Grant Deed =

Transaction for the sale of property by the Cherokee Nation

The Great Grant Deed, also known as The Great Grant, was a transaction for the sale of property by the Cherokee Nation to Richard Henderson and Company. The grant is also known as the Louisa purchase or the Transylvania purchase. The transaction occurred at Sycamore Shoals on the Watauga River on March 17, 1775. The Great Grant was for lands forming Henderson's new Transylvania Colony comprising much of what is now the state of Kentucky.

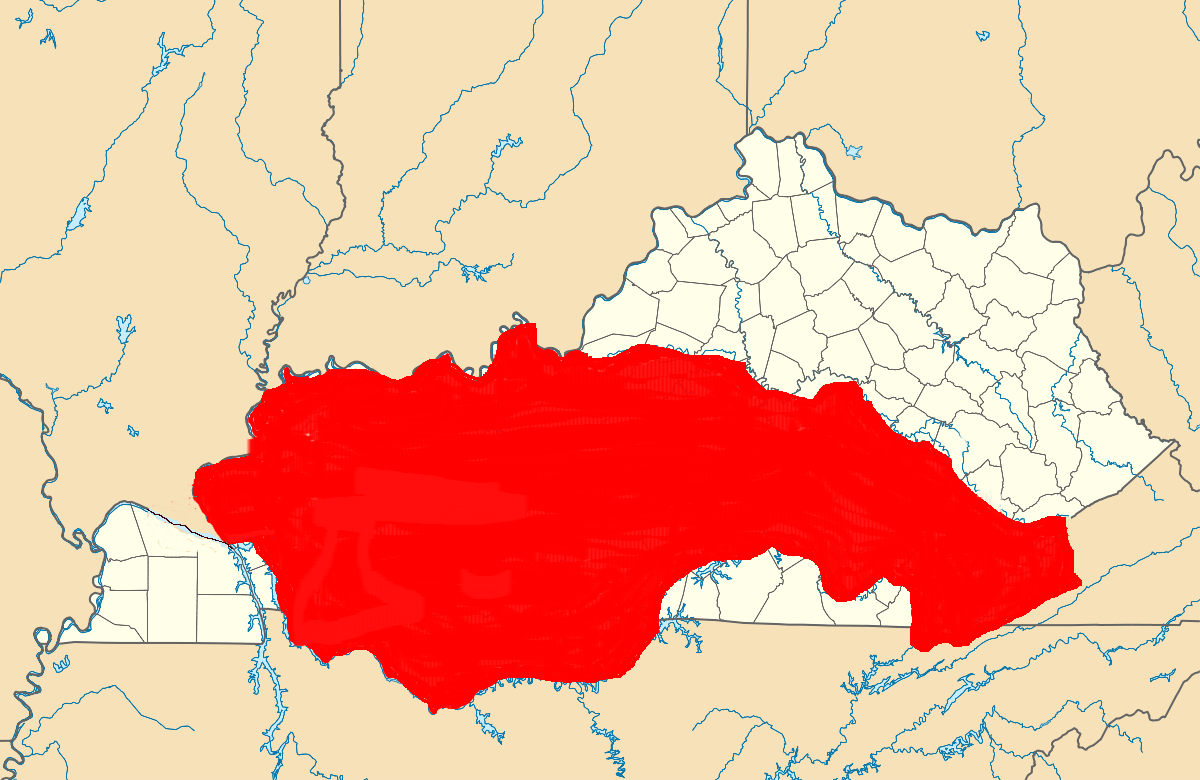
The Great Grant is located in Central Kentucky and Middle Tennessee between the Cumberland, Ohio, and Kentucky Rivers, and extending onto the Powell Valley of southwest Virginia.

The Great Grant was one of five property transactions made near present-day Elizabethton Tennessee at the Sycamore Shoals of the Watauga River, collectively known as The Watauga Treaties. The Path Grant Deed was for lands in East Tennessee and Southwest Virginia required by Henderson and company to permit free passage into Kentucky. The Charles Robertson Grant Deed for Watauga settlement lands and two Jacob Brown Grant Deeds For Nolichucky settlement lands clarified ownership of existing settlements in what is now East Tennessee.

Together these property sales from the Cherokee to the American settlers allowed the westward expansion of the American colonies beyond the Appalachian Mountains. The path beginning in East Tennessee into Kentucky was blazed by Daniel Boone for Richard Henderson and is known as the Wilderness Road.

== The parties to the transaction ==
=== The Buyers ===
The buyers of the lands were Richard Henderson and Company operating as the Transylvania company. Judge Henderson

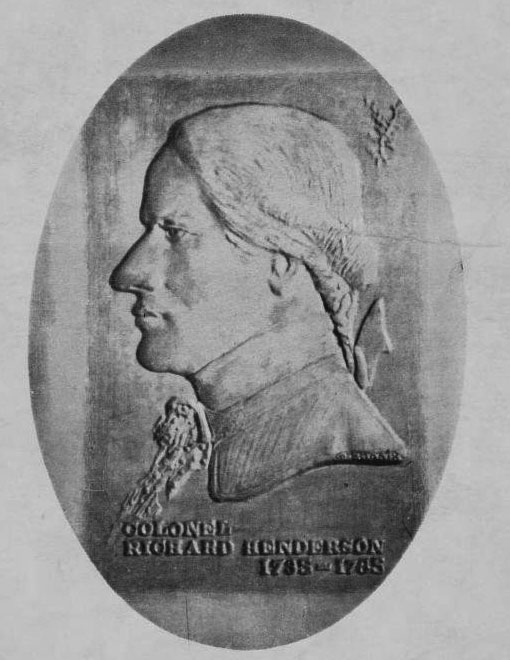
Profile of Col Richard Henderson Some to endure, and many to fail, Some to conquer, and many to quail, Toiling over the Wilderness Trail Richard Henderson

wanted to open the country for settlement. The company was initially organized as the Louisa Company in Hillsboro North Carolina on August 27, 1774. Later, the name was changed to the Transylvania Company in January 1775.

The Transylvania Company was in essence a real estate syndicate. The nine members of the syndicate investing their private funds in the venture are listed several times in the Path Grant deed and similarly in the Great Grant deed that served as the template. Those individuals are Richard Henderson, Thomas Hart, Nathanial Hart, William Johnson, James Hogg, John Lutterell, John Williams, David Hart and Leonard Henley Bullock. All were prominent North Carolina property owners. These men are the partners noted in the Henderson & Co Covenants.

In late summer 1774 at the urging of Daniel Boone that the time was right, Judge Richard Henderson, accompanied by Daniel Boone and Colonel Nathaniel Hart and guided by the experienced Indian-trader, Thomas Price, visited the Cherokee chieftains at the Otari towns. The purpose of the visit was to begin negotiations on behalf of the Louisa Company for vast lands in what is now Kentucky.

As a result of this meeting, the Cherokee Chief Attacullaculla, a young man and a woman made the journey to Cross Creek, Fayetteville North Carolina to view the goods offered as consideration for the sale. The goods met the approval of the Cherokee representatives. The woman was said to be especially pleased with the goods presented.

=== The Sellers ===
The identities of the Great Grant sellers, three Cherokee Chiefs acting for and on behalf of the Cherokee nation and also signatories to the Path Grant deed were Alla Cullocullah (aka Attacullaculla ), Oconistoto, and Savanooko, being the representatives appointed by the warriors and other head men on behalf of the whole nation.

The names of the various Cherokee chiefs Attacullaculla, Oconistoto and Savanooko are frequently noted as being present at the treaty and as signatories to the deeds. There are numerous references indicating other Cherokee in attendance including Dragging Canoe, Chenosta of the middle Cherokee towns, and twelve hundred others. The Cherokee had traveled some 150 miles from their Overhill towns to Ft Watauga in great numbers to individually receive a portion of the goods provided in consideration for the sale of the lands.

It was testified that there was good order during the three weeks the Cherokee were encamped at Ft Watauga. There was for instance an absence of drunkenness and misbehavior. The Cherokee assembled were satisfied with the quality and amount of the goods and merchandise received as consideration.

=== Dissention ===
During the negotiations, Dragging Canoe, a Cherokee warrior and son of Attacullaculla, warned that the land in question might be problematic. He gave an impassioned speech to those assembled. He knew the lands did not actually belong to the Cherokee and any sale of them might be contested.

Within a few days, Henderson learned of opposition to his efforts. On April 7, 1775, within three weeks of the treaty's signing, he was on the trail when he learned of attacks by Indians which resulted in the deaths of settlers headed to Kentucky. Dragging Canoe had been correct. On May 9, 1775, Henderson noted in his journal an encounter with Captain Harrod, who had already established his company on the Salt River, well with in the boundaries of the Great Grant.

Many others, including both Indians and various politicians, also expressed opposition to the treaty.

== The Legality of The Transaction ==
=== The transaction was not considered to be legal ===
In modern parlance, The Henderson and Co purchase of the Great Grant lands from the Cherokee Nation may be considered a double scam. Patrick Henry described the transaction as a scheme. John Adams similarly called it a scheme after receiving James Hogg and his proposal for having the Continental Congress accept Transylvania as the fourteenth colony. Hogg was elected as delegate to the Continental Congress from the unrecognized Transylvania Colony.

The Transylvania colony and the land it claimed were nullified by the Virginia House of delegates by the Resolution of November 4, 1778. The problem was that Henderson had no legal basis for the purchase. To the contrary, his actions were illegal and in violation of the Royal Decree of 1763 prohibiting precisely such actions. Further, the Virginia Charter claimed all the lands within the boundaries to the Mississippi river. Richard Henderson's fictional Transylvania colony, the sovereign entity created to treat with the sovereign Cherokee nation, was thwarted by the powerful politicians of the Virginia Commonwealth. Such notables as George Washington, Sam Adams and Thomas Jefferson weighed in on the matter

Henderson believed to the contrary. He made studies of similar property transactions to develop structure and precedent for Henderson and Co. Henderson went to England and obtained legal advice from Lord Mansfield, the great English jurist and future Lord Chancellor, that purchase of lands in American Colonies was not really different than purchasing land in East India and did not require permission of the crown

=== The sellers right to sell ===
On the other side of the transaction, there were also some problems. Foremost of the problems was that the Cherokee Nation said to be represented by Attacullaculla, Oconistoto and Savaninoko did not actually own all of the land it was selling. At very best, the Cherokee Nation ownership of the land between the Kentucky River and the Cumberland River was based on the claim of the old Chief Attacullaculla. The claim made in the deed said to have been read and understood by the signatory Chiefs and other Cherokee present indicated aboriginal ownership since the beginning of time. Path grant – via Wikisource. . That was just not true. The title of any of the lands within the Great Grant was far from certain and the topic of several depositions made before the Virginia convention investigating the matter.

"Though Claimed by many, Kentucky was by common consent not inhabited by any of the tribes"

The Cherokee Chief Chenosta from the Middle Cherokee Towns told Thomas Price that so far as he knew, the Cherokee had no claim on the lands north of the Cumberland River and took no part in the signing of the deeds.

Some believe that a primary reason for the Henderson & Co transaction with the Cherokee was that the northernmost Cherokee towns were a scant 50 or so miles from the Cumberland Gap and commanded the route of the Wilderness Road. That is, the Cherokee were in effect bought off to protect the route into Kentucky.

The lands included in the Path Grant were different. Those lands were to the south of the Cumberland River and Cumberland Mountain. In his speech where Dragging Canoe referred to a "dark cloud over the bloody Ground" he was making certain reference to the fact that there were other Indians in those lands between the rivers that would fight and die to keep them.

Within one month, "Indians" made several attacks on various parties bound for Kentucky and killed at least four of the whites, two of which were scalped. Although the Cherokee title to all the lands in the deed might not have ever been completely resolved, the Virginia commission claimed the lands and that ended the matter.

== Virginia and North Carolina Nullified the Great Grant 1777 ==
=== Action by Virginia ===
Although aware of the pending treaty in January 1775, Virginia Governor Dunsmore ( Lord Dunsmore) actually learned of the Great Grant transaction within four days of the signing. Thus began a series of events resulting in hearings before the Virginia Convention wherein many individuals were deposed to learn what transpired. The final determination was that Section 14 of the Declaration of Rights required territorial integrity under the Virginia Constitution. The territory west of the line from the mouth of the Great Kanawa to the point on the Holston River 6 miles upstream from the Long Island of the Holston was Virginia territory. Virginia did not recognize the Transylvania Colony The nullification was by a Virginia act in December 1778

=== Action by North Carolina ===
North Carolina Governor Martin issued a proclamation of opposition in February 1775 in opposition. Subsequently, in accord with Virginia and the voices of the Watauga settlers demanding clarification of the boundaries, North Carolina nullified the Transylvania Colony and asserted sovereignty over the western territory. That western territory was declared to be the Washington district and included all of what is now Tennessee. This action formally transpired in November 1777. The involvement of North Carolina in the Great Grant dealings was not nearly so significant as that of Virginia. The lands in question were those where the Cumberland River dipped south of the stated North Carolina/Virginia boundary of 36° 30' that had never actually been surveyed. A survey was needed and Richard Henderson became one of six commissioners to run the line in 1779.

=== Restitution to Henderson & Co.: The Green River tract ===
The Virginia Convention having nullified the Great Grant and thus the Transylvania Colony recognized that Richard Henderson & Co. had in fact made a positive effort and some recompense was in order. The Convention then made a grant of some 200,000 acres to the company.

The map depicts a tract of ground containing 200,000 acres granted by the Virginia Convention to Richard Henderson and Company in 1778. The tract lies on the Kentucky side of the Ohio and includes the present town of Henderson.

On Wednesday, November 4, 1778, the Virginia House of Delegates:

Resolved, That all purchases of lands made or to be made of the Indians within the chartered bounds of this Commonwealth, as described by the constitution or form of Government, by any private persons not authorized by public authority, are void.

Resolved, That the purchase heretofore made by Colonel Henderson & Co., of the Cherokee Indians is void.

But as said Richard Henderson and Company have been at very great expense in making the said purchase, and in settling the said lands, by which this Commonwealth is likely to receive great advantage by increasing its inhabitants, and establishing a barrier against the Indians, it is just and reasonable to allow the said Richard Henderson & Co. a compensation for their trouble and expense.

On Tuesday, November 17, these resolution of the House were agreed to by the Senate and a few weeks afterwards-

It was enacted by the General Assembly of Virginia, That all the tract of land situate, lying and being on the waters of the Ohio and Green Rivers, and bounded as follows, to wit:

Beginning at the mouth of Green River, thence running up the same twelve and one-half miles, when reduced to a straight line, thence running at right angles with the said reduced lines, twelve and one half miles each side of the river, thence running lines from the termination of the line extended on each side of Green River, at right angles with the same, till the said lines intersect the Ohio, which said river Ohio shall be the western boundary of the said trace, be, and the same is hereby granted the said Richard Henderson & Co., and their heirs as tenants in common, subject to the payment

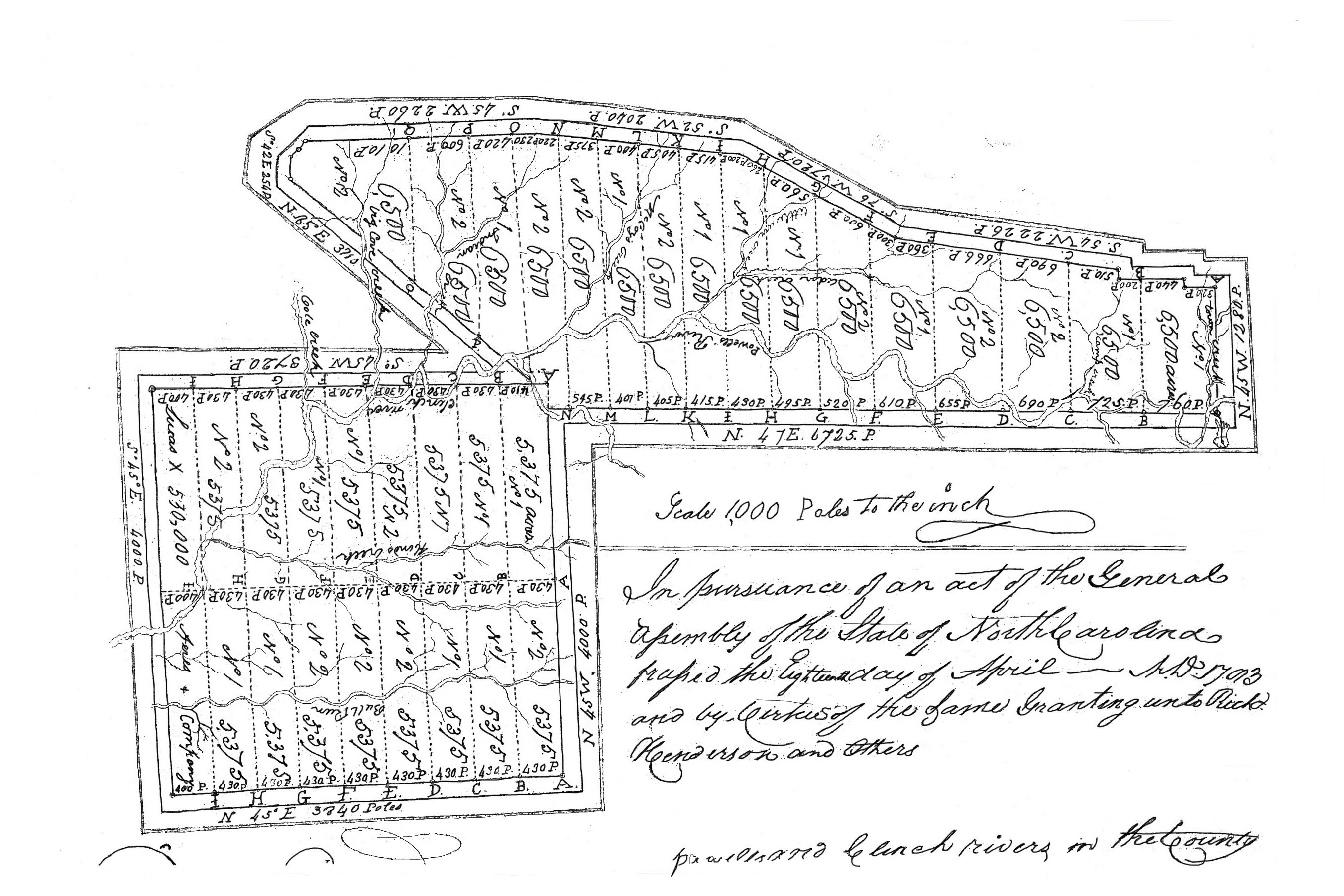
Henderson Grant Map in Powell and Clinch Valley, Hawkins County, North Carolina (now Tennessee)

=== Restitution to Henderson & Co: The Powell Valley tract ===
Years later, in 1783, North Carolina determined that Richard Henderson and Co.

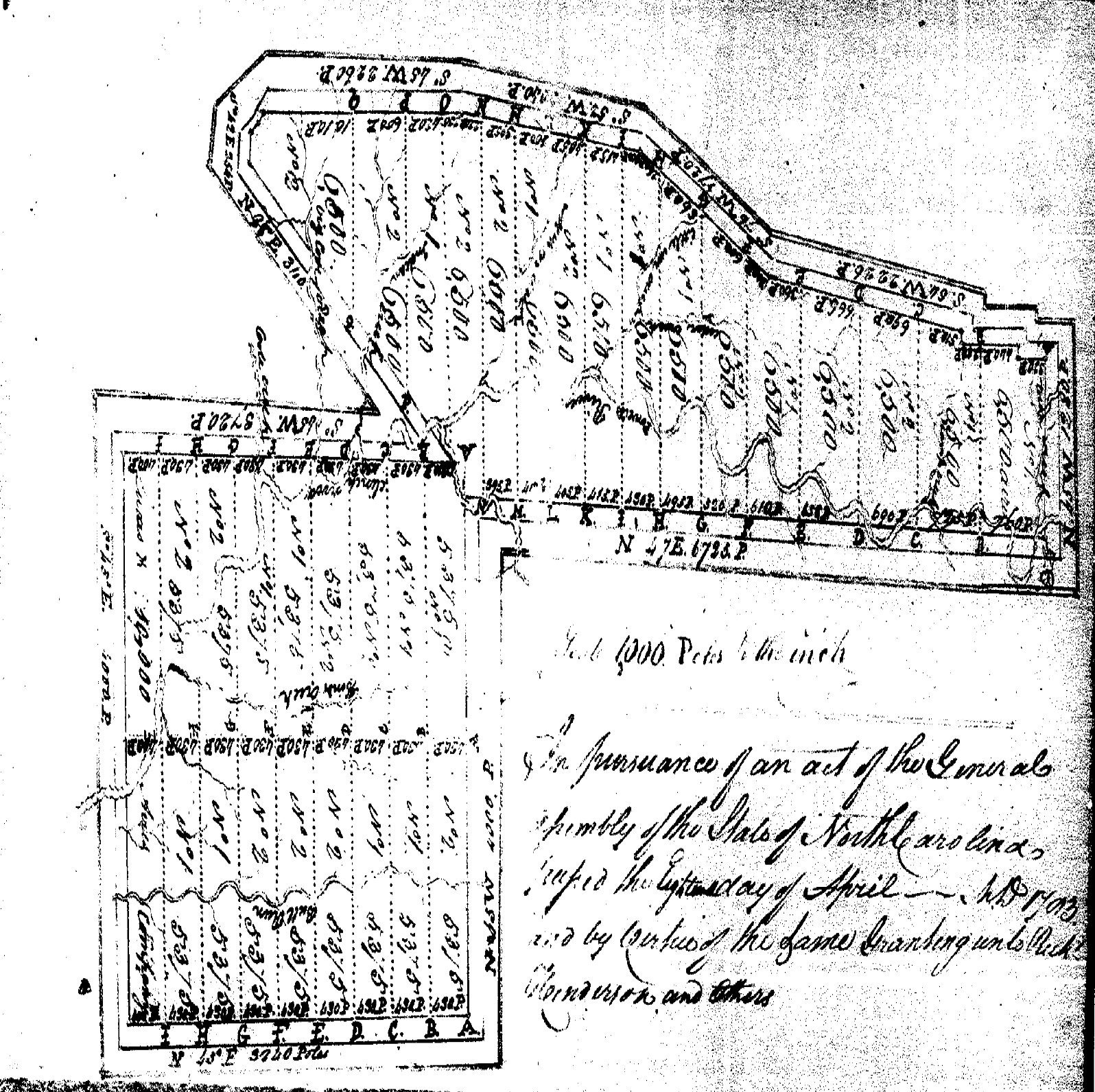
The drawing is the map drawn by the surveyors of the property granted to the Henderson & Co. The property lies along the Powell River between the Cumberland Mountain and the Powell Mountain. The westerly line is the line of the Great Grant that extends to form the Path Grant and the boundary on the south is contiguous with the Path Grant. A second tract is on the Clinch River further to the west in Tennessee. Taken together the total is said to be 200,000 acres. The tract is noted in Yellow as #2 on the Great Grant Map below.

should be compensated for their efforts and with some portion of the grant lands that were nullified. A grant was made for 190,000 acres in the Powell Valley Curiously, this land grant by North Carolina to Henderson & Co was mostly in what is now Virginia. The grant made in two tracts did include acreage further west in what is now Anderson County Tennessee.

== The nature of the land ==
=== The lay of the land, for the Watauga Treaties Grants ===
An understanding of the lands conveyed is helpful to develop an understanding of the events and transactions at Sycamore Shoals. A group of North Carolinians led by Richard Henderson from Hillsboro, Orange county sensed opportunity for development of the lands in the far west, of what would become Kentucky. That group intent on obtaining the Great Grant or the lands of Kentucky provided the impetus for the other four land transactions concluded at Sycamore Shoals in March 1775. The concept of Watauga Treaty lands was not based on political boundaries drawn on a map and easy to understand. Out west, beyond the high Appalachian mountain barrier, there were no political boundaries. The owners of the lands, the Cherokee and others had no maps nor lines.

The concept of territories was defined by the geographical features that were clearly identified and known in considerable detail by all. The features were mountains, ridges and waterways, of drainage, watersheds. The Great Grant or Transylvania Colony was for the most part defined by rivers, the vast land area contained within the Kentucky, Cumberland, Tennessee and Ohio Rivers. The Kentucky Geological Survey map of 1889 indicates geographical features controlling the westward travel beyond the Appalachian chain barrier. The long low mountains draining into rivers and valleys and the intervening gaps forced travel direction. The same features were the basis for describing the Great Grant and Path Grant boundaries.

The Cumberland River lands diverge from the Kentucky River lands along the crest of Cumberland Mountain. The rivers diverge to contain the extensive lands of central Kentucky. Although separated by as few as 4 or 5 miles at their sources on Cumberland Mountain, the Cumberland and Kentucky river mouths diverge as the crow flies by, 214 miles, between the points where they empty into the Ohio River. It was the broad river bottom land with rich soil suitable for clearing and farming that was desired by the new settlers. It was the vast potential of central Kentucky that was desired by Richard Henderson & Co. It was the long river valleys that provided relatively easily traversed pathways that permitted entry and travel within the vast new territories.

=== The Great Grant Parcels clause description of the lands. ===
Although there were nine original signed copies of the Great Grant indenture, none is known to have survived. One Thomas Price, the last of the nine witnesses to sign the Path Grant was deposed by the Virginia Convention, 1776–77 and provided the convention the wording of the Parcels clause of both the Great Grant and Path Grant indentures. Path grant – via Wikisource. The Virginia Convention was assembled to nullify the Transylvania Colony and to determine how the Richard Henderson and Company should be compensated for their efforts. Thomas Price was "a noted Indian trader" who accompanied Richard Henderson on a visit to the Cherokee town of Otari to begin negotiations. His deposition provided the first hand independent testimony on what actually took place.

The text of the Great Grant Parcels Clause follows:

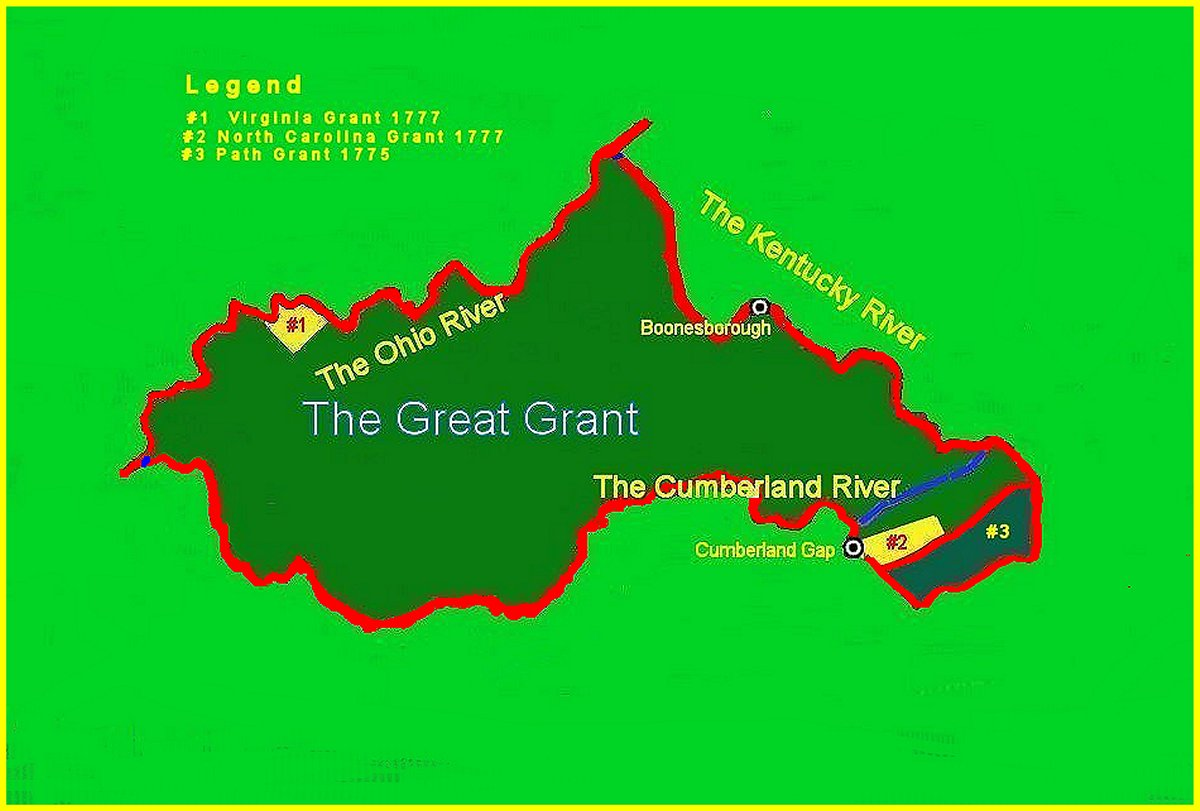
The Great Grant is shown between the Cumberland, Ohio, and Kentucky Rivers. The Blue line is the Cumberland River extended into the Great Grant Area. The grant extends below the Blue line and across the Cumberland Mountain into the Powell River Valley. The Great Grant line is contiguous with the Path Grant line along the length of Powell Mountain.

". . . all that Tract, Territory or parcel of Land, situated lying & being in North America, on the Ohio River, one of the Eastern Branches of the Mississippi River beginning on the said Ohio River at the Mouth of the Kentucky, Chenosa or what by the English is called Louisa River, from thence running up the said River and the most Northwardly fork of the same to the head of a spring thereof, thence a south east to the top of a ridge of Powells Mountain thence Westwardly along the ridge of the said mountain unto a point from which a Northwest Course will hit or strike the head spring of the most Southwardly branch of the Cumberland River thence down the said River all its waters to the Ohio River thence up the said River as it meanders to the beginning . . ."

Although there is no known copy of the Great Grant indenture, there is a surviving copy of the companion Path Grant Deed that was recorded some twenty years later on November 15, 1794, by the Registrar of Hawkins County Tennessee. That deed was signed by the three Cherokee Chiefs, the Interpreter for the crown Joseph Von who was titled Linquester, and nine witnesses, one of whom was Thomas Price.

It can be assumed that except for the Parcels Clause, the Great Grant indenture document and the Path Grant indenture document are identical. This assumption is not unreasonable because with the exception of the Parcels clause, the Recital Clause, all the purchasers, the various nine tenants in common, the Cherokee chiefs and all the deed structural elemental clauses were all the same.

All the language structure of both parcels clauses is similar and in some phrases identical. Most telling though is the inclusion of the consideration. The Path Grant provides for a consideration "of the sum of ten thousand pounds lawful money of Great Britton". The consideration for the Great Grant is universally said to be ten thousand pounds and often clarified by the statement in money or goods. This provides something of a dilemma that supports the identical nature of both indentures. History repeatedly records that the valuation of the Watauga Treaty land sales was ten thousand pounds. For that to be true and not twenty thousand pounds, the ten thousand pounds of the Great Grant and the ten thousand pounds of the Path Grant must be one and the same.

=== The Great Grant map ===
The description of the lands between the Cumberland and Kentucky rivers above is well known and used by map makers to illustrate the Great Grant lands.

"During this year {1767} John Findley a fearless Indian trader from North Carolina accompanied by several comrades visited the West Passing through Upper East Tennessee to the Cumberland Gap he continued his explorations to the Kentucky river" Others, including Daniel Boone followed. The Transylvania lands were well known and the demarcation was accurate.

The map by Nikater frequently depicted on the internet correctly indicates the land contained between the rivers as the Great Grant. That map, however, fails to include a very large boundary that lies to the south and that permits passage into the land bounded by the rivers via the all-important Cumberland Gap. The land in question within the Great Grant has a common boundary with the lands described in the Path Grant Deed that lies along the crest of Powell's Mountain.

The lines are from the mouth of the Kentucky River where it empties into the Ohio River at Carrollton, then along the Kentucky River and its north fork to a point on Cumberland Mountain. That point is the source spring of the river. It is at Payne Gap, just south east of Jenkins. A line is then drawn to the south east to a point on Powell Mountain at the corner with the Path Grant at the Lochaber treaty line. The line is then contiguous with the Path Grant Powell mountain line to the corner at the southwesterly end of Powell Mountain. The Great Grant line then extends the Path Grant south west line northerly to a spot on Cumberland Mountain just west of Cumberland Gap. From that point drainage northerly is to the Cumberland River. A large creek flows from the base of the mountain in Middlesboro northward to the Cumberland River near East Pineville. After joining, the line follows the Cumberland River until it reaches the mouth at Paducah and joins the Ohio River. The Line then follows the Ohio River upstream to the beginning at Carrollton.

== Revolution ==
On April 19, 1775, only one month after the signing of the Great Grant, the shot heard round the world was fired in Concord Massachusetts and the American Revolution began. Later On July 4, 1776, the formal United States Declaration of Independence was signed in Philadelphia. That same day, in Williamsburg, Virginia, the Virginia Convention acting as a new state resolved to hear the testimony concerning the Transylvania colony.

Notes on Depositions:

July 4. 1776. Commission to Collect Evidence in behalf of Virginia against persons pretending to have claims for lands within the territory thereof, under deeds and purchases from Indians; & for such purpose given power to summons and examine witnesses under oath and due notice of twenty days being given & c

The American revolt of the thirteen colonies was under way

The declaration establishing the convention foreshadowed the coming decision. That date of July 4, 1776 was an important one for Thomas Jefferson who wrote the Declaration and had a part in the Virginia Convention. His hand written annotations appear on the above noted memorandum.

So it was that Richard Henderson and company did their due diligence. They sent Daniel Boone to explore and report the finding. Richard Henderson went with Thomas Price and Nathaniel Hart to meet with Attacullaculla. They inquired about the legalities of the Crown law from high British officials. They did not however foresee the change that was coming that transformed Crown Law to American law.

Richard Henderson and Company did not foresee a revolution

== Sources ==
Ramsey, J.G. M., The Annals of Tennessee, 1853, Steam Power Press of Charleston
Henderson, Archibald (1), The Conquest of the Old Southwest, The Romantic Story of the Early Pioneers into Virginia, the Carolinas, Tennessee, and Kentucky, 1740–1790, New York, The century Co, 1920
Henderson, Archibald (2), The Transylvania Company and the founding of Henderson Kentucky, page 11f
Hamer, Philip M. Phd Tennessee A History 1675- 1932, The American Historical Society 1935, vol I page 71
The Thomas Jefferson Papers Series 1 . General Correspondence 1657-1827 .Richard Henderson, et al. To Virginia Convention, Library of Congress, American Memory, page 11 ( 767)
Edmund L. Starling, History of Henderson County, Kentucky 1887, page 18
Henderson, Archibald (3), The Significance of the Transylvania Company in American History, an address Delivered at the Transylvania Memorial Celebration, Boonesborough, Kentucky, October 12, 1935.
Perrin, William Henry and J.H. Battle, Kentucky A History of the State, Embracing and consise Account of the Origin, F.A. Battery & Co 1886
Skinner, Constance Lindsey, Pioneers of the Old Southwest, Public Domain, Chap VII
Hallmark, Linda Hicks, Journal of Richard Henderson 1775, Henderson County Kentucky Historical and Genealogical Society 2009
Henderson & Co Covenants, Partnership Agreement January 1775
Louisa Company, Partnership Agreement, 27 August 1774
Brewster, William, The Fourteenth Commonwealths, Philadelphia, George S. McManus Co 1960.
Library of Congress, Jefferson M.S.S. 5th series, Vol VII "A copy of the proceedings of Virginia Convention from June 15th to Nov 19th 1777" Tennessee Historical Society A.C. 443

== See also ==
- Sycamore Shoals
- Daniel Boone
- Wilderness Road
- Dragging Canoe
- Lord Mansfield
