= Sycamore Shoals =

River rapids along the Watauga River in Elizabethton, Tennessee, US

- U.S. National Register of Historic Places
- U.S. National Historic Landmark
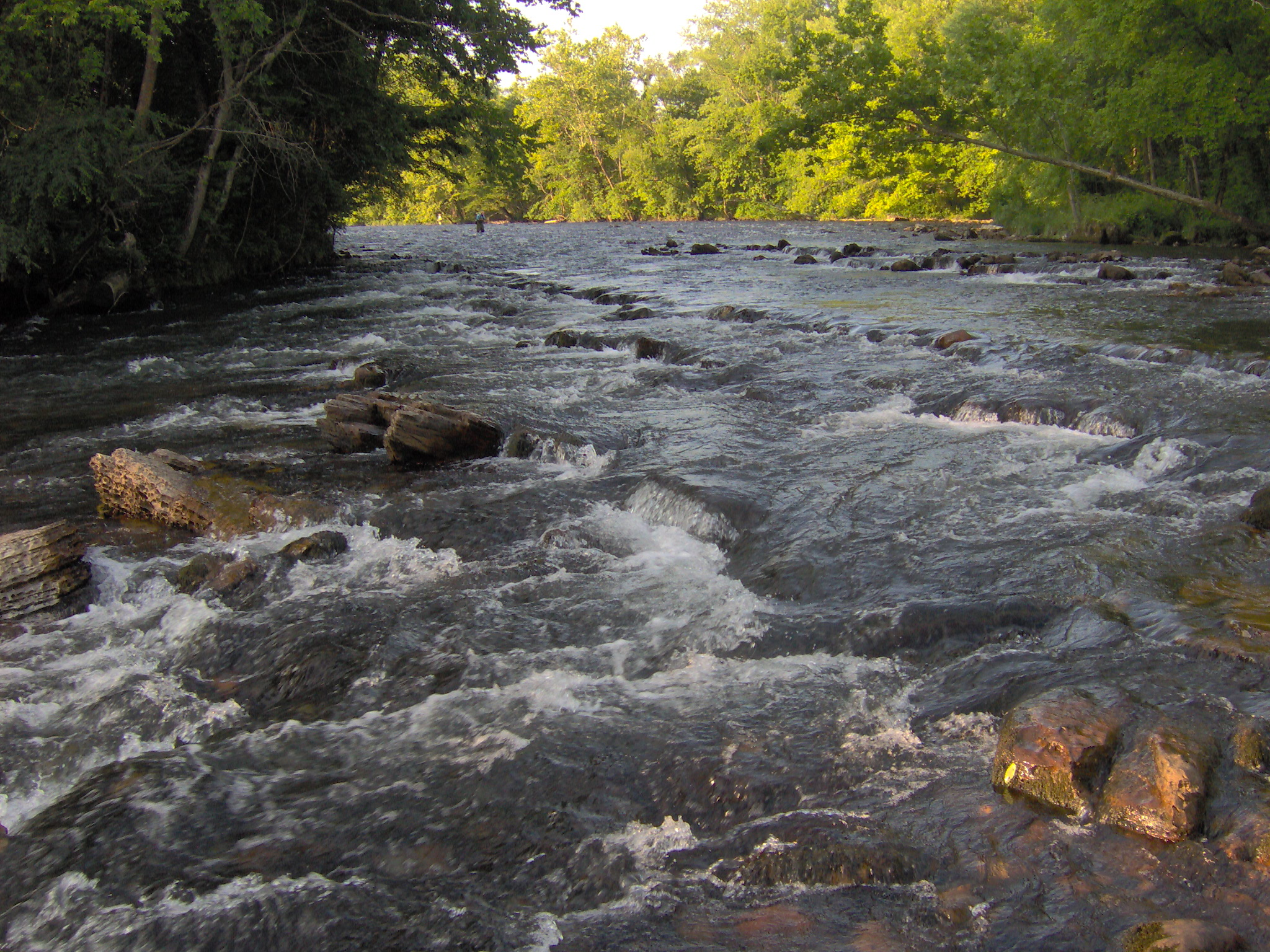
- Sycamore Shoals

- Location within Tennessee Location within the United States
- Nearest city: Elizabethton, Tennessee
- Coordinates: 36°20′33″N 82°15′21″W
- NRHP reference No.: 66000721

Significant dates
- Added to NRHP: October 15, 1966
- Designated NHL: July 19, 1964

The Sycamore Shoals of the Watauga River, usually shortened to Sycamore Shoals, is a rocky stretch of river rapids along the Watauga River in Elizabethton, Tennessee. Archeological excavations have found Native Americans lived near the shoals since prehistoric times, and Cherokees gathered there. As Europeans began settling the Trans-Appalachian frontier, the shoals proved strategic militarily, as well as shaped the economies of Tennessee and Kentucky. Today, the shoals are protected as a National Historic Landmark and are maintained as part of Sycamore Shoals State Historic Park.

Explorer James Robertson (later a founder of Nashville) identified the alluring flatlands at Sycamore Shoals, known as the Watauga Old Fields, in 1770, and led a group of colonists to the area shortly thereafter. In 1772, the Watauga settlers established the Watauga Association, one of the first constitutional governments west of the Appalachian Mountains and the "germ-cell" of what would later become the state of Tennessee.

In 1775, Richard Henderson and Daniel Boone negotiated the Treaty of Sycamore Shoals, in which Henderson's Transylvania Company purchased a large part of modern Kentucky and part of Tennessee from the Cherokee. The following year, the Watauga settlers successfully repelled one arm of a Cherokee group contesting land near Fort Watauga in a struggle that saw the creation of numerous stories surrounding figures such as Nancy Ward and John Sevier. In 1780, at the height of the American Revolutionary War, the frontier militia known as the Overmountain Men mustered at Sycamore Shoals as it prepared to march across the mountains en route to victory over British loyalists at the Battle of Kings Mountain.

== Location ==
The Sycamore Shoals is located at just over 23 miles (37 km) upstream from the mouth of the Watauga River, and approximately 3 miles (4.8 km) downstream from the river's confluence with the Doe River and 11 miles (18 km) downstream from Wilbur Dam. While managed by the Tennessee Department of Environment and Conservation, the shoals are located within the municipal boundaries of Elizabethton. Beyond the shoals, the Watauga flows for another 8 miles (13 km) before entering its Boone Lake impoundment.

== History ==
=== Prehistory and early history ===
Excavations in the flats around Sycamore Shoals have uncovered evidence of significant habitation dating back to the Woodland period (ca. 1000 B.C. – 1000 A.D.) and continuing sporadically through much of the Mississippian period (ca. 900–1600 A.D.). In 1567, a contingent of the Juan Pardo expedition passed through the Nolichucky River valley to the south and attacked a fortified Chisca village (the village was probably located between modern Jonesborough and Erwin). By the late 17th century, the Mississippian-period inhabitants had largely vanished, and had been replaced by the Cherokee, who used Sycamore Shoals as a gathering place and hunting camp.

By the 1760s, long hunters such as Julius Dugger and Andrew Greer were operating stations in the Watauga Valley in the vicinity of Sycamore Shoals. In 1769, William Bean, known traditionally as Tennessee's first permanent white settler, built a cabin at the confluence of Boone's Creek and the Watauga, about 15 miles (24 km) downstream from the Shoals. Around the same time, John Honeycut was operating out of a hut at the mouth of Roan Creek (about 20 miles upstream from the Shoals, now part of Watauga Lake). Early hunters and explorers called the flats around Sycamore Shoals the Watauga "Old Fields," as they were full of cane rather than trees, resembling once-cultivated fields that had for years lain fallow.

=== Settlement ===
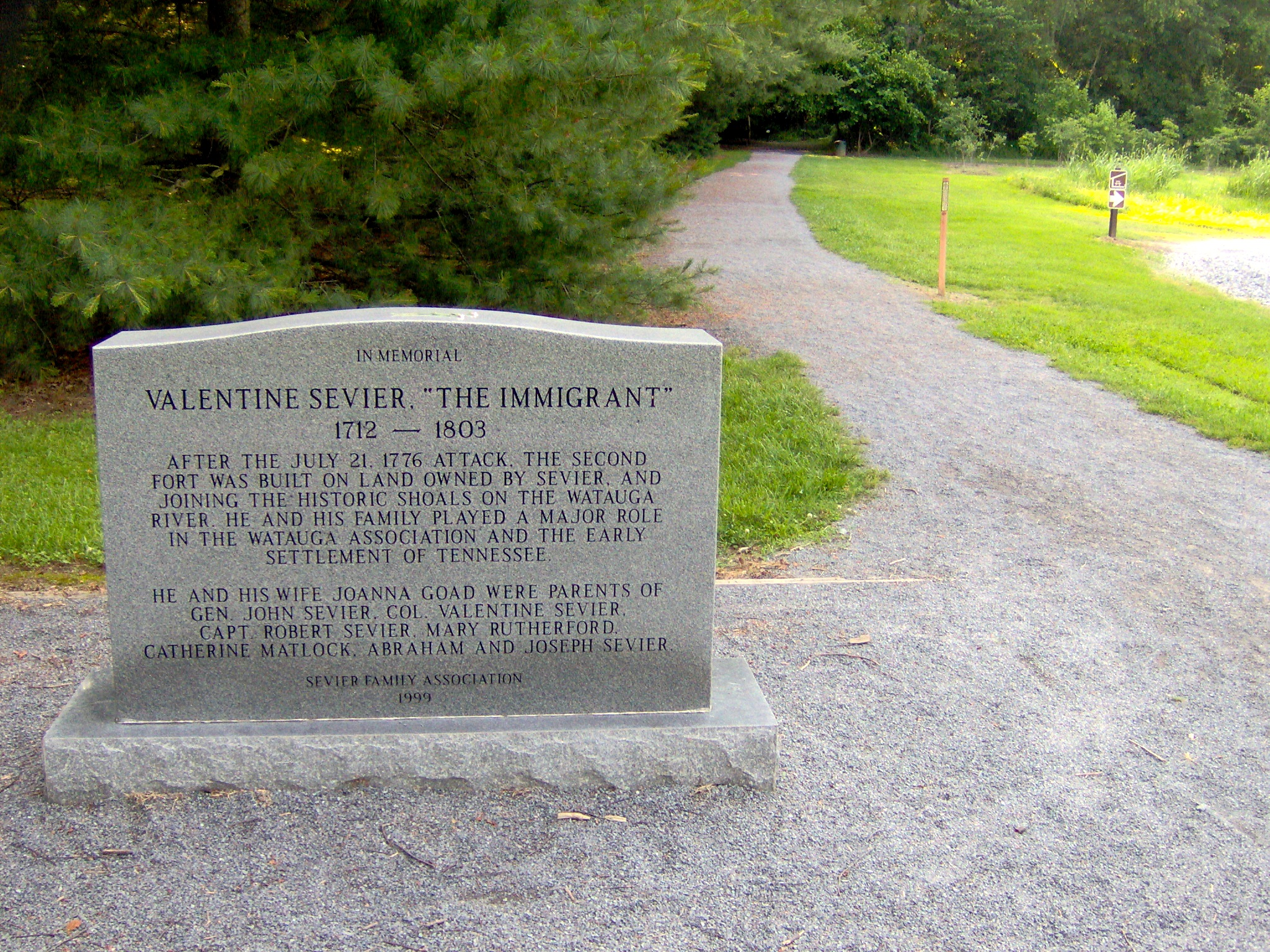
Valentine Sevier monument at Sycamore Shoals; the Seviers arrived in the Sycamore Shoals area in 1773.

In the Spring of 1770, James Robertson, possibly fleeing the turmoil created by the Regulator Movement in his home state of North Carolina, made an excursion into the Watauga Valley. He met John Honeycut, who pointed him to the Old Fields. Robertson later described the Old Fields as a "Promised Land" where fertile fields had already been cleared of the dense forest that dominated most lands in the region. Robertson planted crops and built a small cabin and corn crib on the north bank of the confluence to both the Watauga River and the Doe River and then returned to North Carolina to notify family and friends of his discovery. In late 1770 or early 1771, Robertson returned to the Old Fields with sixteen families in tow. Robertson's settlement, which became known as the Watauga Settlement, grew quickly.

The Watauga settlers believed (or claimed to have believed) that they were on lands that were part of the British domain, as the Watauga River is part of the watershed of the Holston River, the latter being established as the boundary between British and Cherokee lands by the 1770 Treaty of Lochaber. In 1771, however, a survey by John Donelson discovered that the Watauga settlements, along with the nearby Nolichucky settlement and an area east of Long Island of the Holston known as Carter's Valley, were on lands still claimed by the Cherokee. British Superintendent of Indian Affairs John Stuart thus ordered the Watauga settlers to vacate the valley and return to British territory.

=== The Watauga Association ===
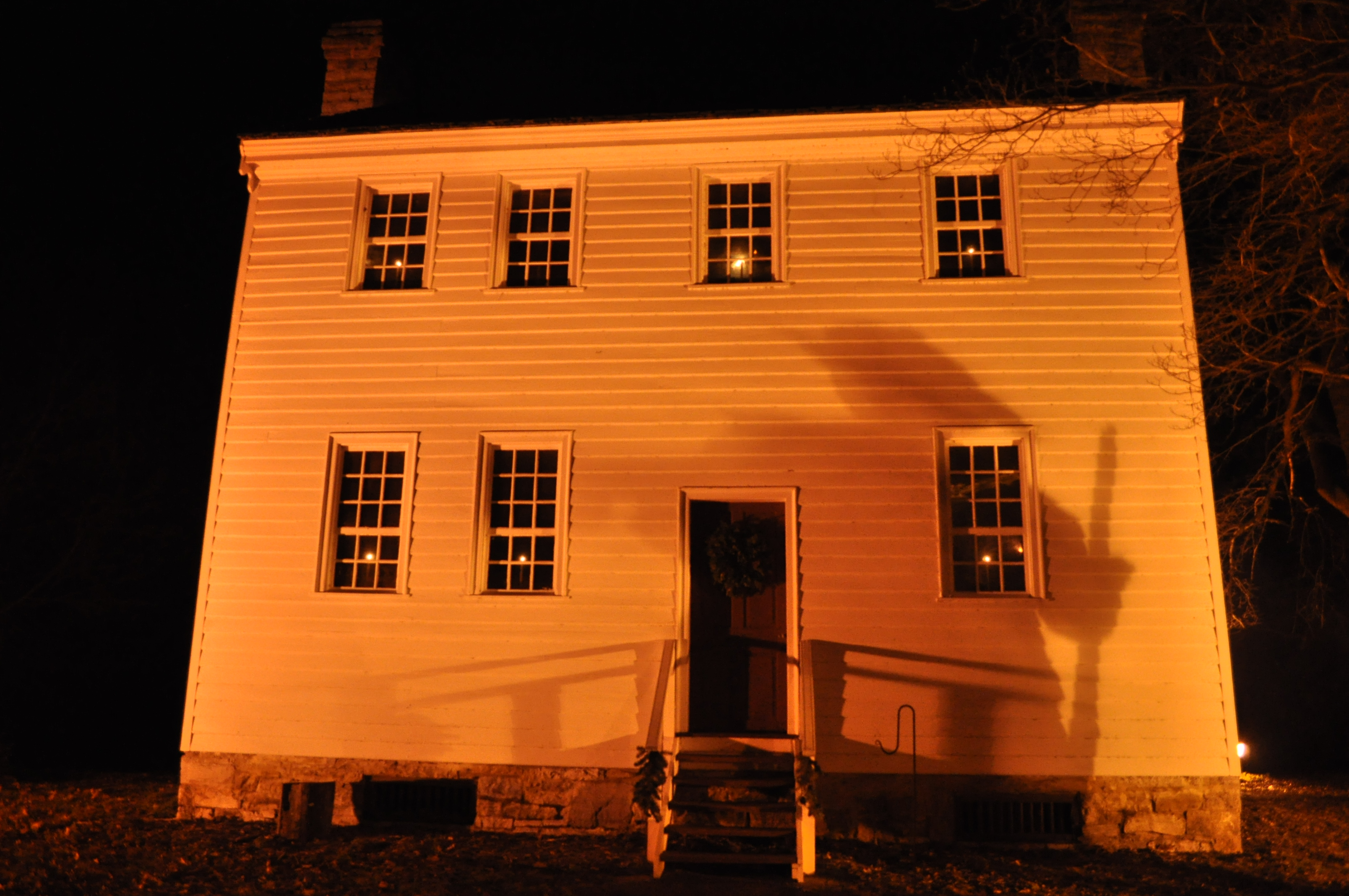
Carter Mansion ca. 1775-1780, oldest frame house in Tennessee

In 1772, the Watauga settlers, hoping to keep control of the land they had been developing, sent James Robertson and James Bean to Chota, where they negotiated a 10-year lease for the lands in the Watauga Valley. Being outside the authority of the Virginia and North Carolina colonial governments, the settlers lacked any official means of dealing with criminals and carrying out basic government functions, such as registering land deeds. Thus, in May 1772, the settlers drafted the Articles of the Watauga Association— one of the first written constitutions west of the Appalachian Mountains. The Watauga Association consisted of a five-man court that held sessions in a courthouse at Sycamore Shoals. The Association is often considered the root of state government in Tennessee, especially since many Wataugans went on to play prominent roles in the failed State of Franklin in the 1780s and in the Southwest Territory and Tennessee state governments in the 1790s. While later writers such as U.S. President Theodore Roosevelt romanticized the Watauga Association as a microcosm of the American Revolution, modern historians point out that the Wataugans never claimed to be independent of the British Crown, and tried to associate themselves with Virginia.

The Carter Mansion, the oldest frame house standing in Tennessee, may be the only surviving material link to the Watauga Association. Listed on the National Register of Historic Places, the mansion was built between 1775 and 1780 by John Carter and his son Landon. John and Landon Carter were both prominent in political and military affairs, serving during the American Revolution and several conflicts with Native Americans. When Tennessee was admitted into the United States in 1796, Carter County was named for Landon Carter, and the county seat of Elizabethton was named for his wife, Elizabeth Maclin Carter. The finely detailed interior and over-mantle paintings place the mansion among the most significant historic houses in Tennessee.

=== Treaty of Sycamore Shoals ===
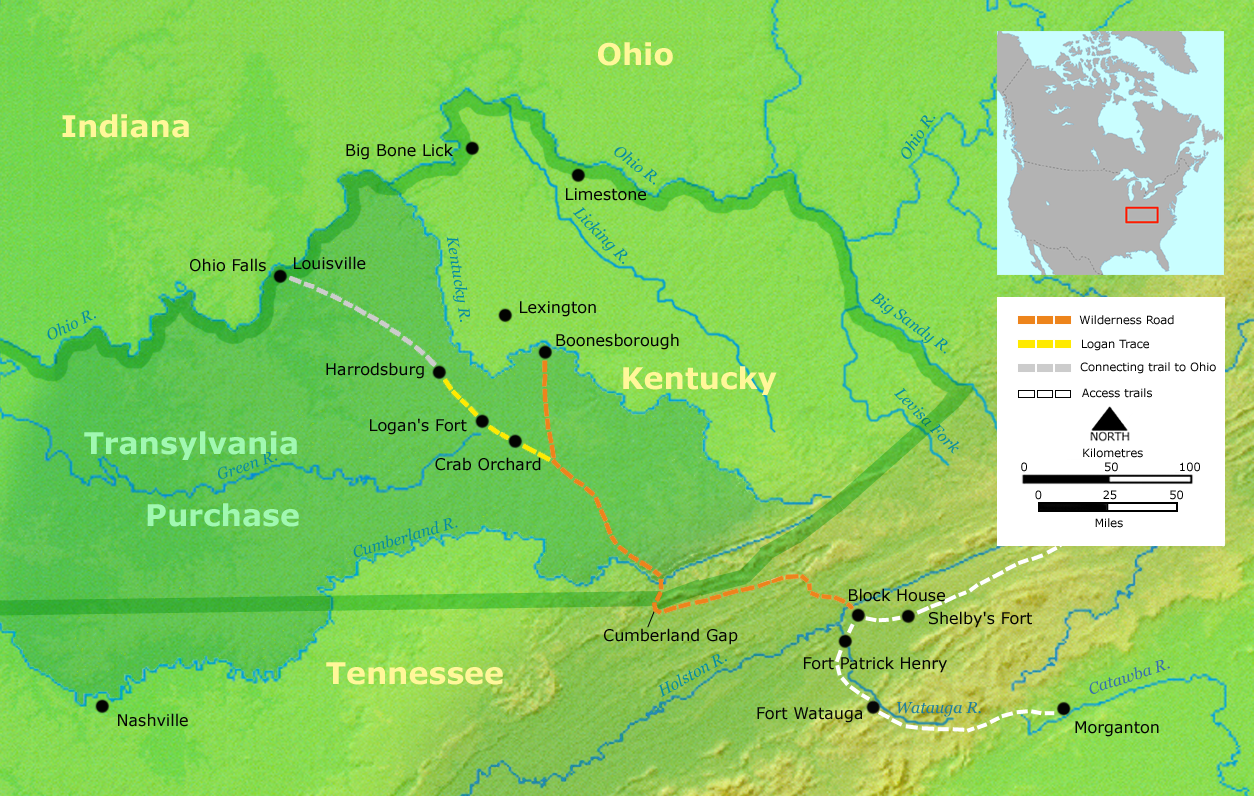
The Wilderness Road and the Transylvania Purchase

The defeat of the Shawnee in Lord Dunmore's War in 1774 emboldened land speculators in North Carolina, who believed much of what is now Kentucky and Tennessee would soon be under British control. One such speculator, Richard Henderson (1734–1785), learned from his friend Daniel Boone that the Cherokee were interested in selling a large part of their land on the Trans-Appalachian frontier, and Henderson quickly set up negotiations with Cherokee leaders. Between March 14 and March 17, 1775, Henderson, Boone, and several associates met at Sycamore Shoals with Cherokee leaders Attakullakulla, Oconastota, Willanawaw, Doublehead and Dragging Canoe, the latter of whom sought unsuccessfully to reject Henderson's purchase of tribal lands outside the Donelson line, and departed the conference vowing to turn the lands "dark and bloody" if settlers attempted to settle upon them. The rest of the negotiations went fairly smoothly, however, and the Treaty of Sycamore Shoals was signed on March 17, 1775. At the same conference, the Watauga and Nolichucky settlers negotiated similar purchases for their lands.

The Treaty of Sycamore Shoals, sometimes called the "Transylvania Purchase" (after Henderson's Transylvania Company, which had raised money for the endeavor), basically consisted of two parts. The first, known as the "Path Grant Deed", regarded the Transylvania Company's purchase of lands in Southwest Virginia (including parts of what is now West Virginia) and northeastern Tennessee. The second part, known as the "Great Grant," acknowledged the Transylvania Company's purchase of some 20,000,000 acres (81,000 km^{2}) of land between the Kentucky River and Cumberland River, which included a large portion of modern Kentucky and northern Tennessee. The Transylvania Company paid for the land with 10,000 pounds sterling of trade goods. After the treaty was signed, Boone proceeded northward to blaze the Wilderness Road, connecting the Transylvania Purchase lands with the Holston settlements.

=== Fort Watauga ===
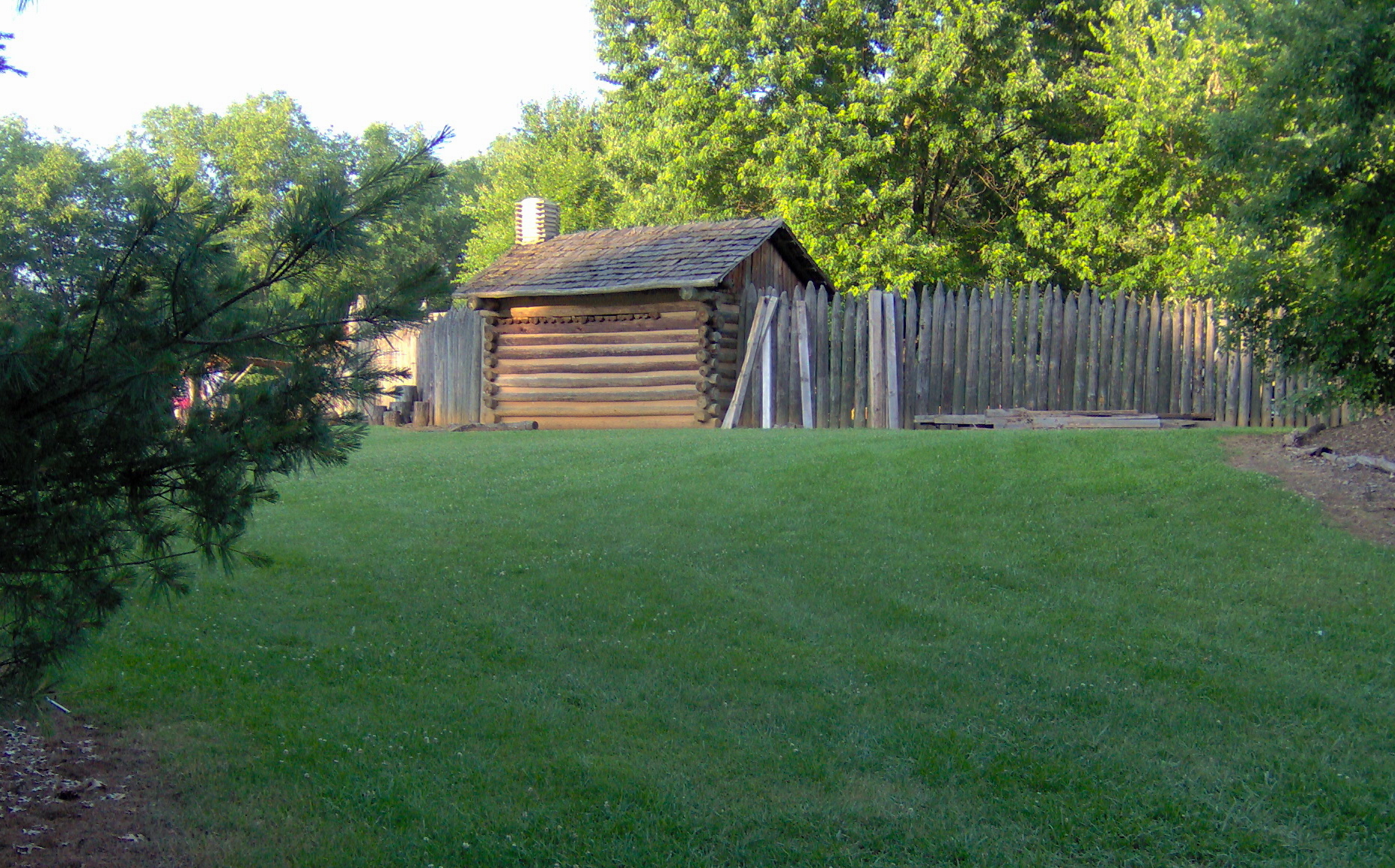
The reconstructed Fort Watauga

The Transylvania Purchase and the accompanying Watauga and Nolichucky purchases violated the Royal Proclamation of 1763, and the Virginia and North Carolina assemblies rejected their legality. At the outbreak of the American Revolutionary War in the months after the treaty was signed, the settlers aligned themselves with the colonies, whereas the Cherokee aligned themselves with the British. The Watauga and Nolichucky settlers organized themselves into the "Washington District" and formed a Committee of Safety, which set out to purchase arms and ammunition. The committee also oversaw the construction of various forts, including Fort Caswell (later called Fort Watauga) at Sycamore Shoals.

In July 1776, the Cherokee invaded the Nolichucky, Holston, and Watauga settlements. Although the settlers were chased out of Carter's Valley and the Nolichucky valley, the Holston settlers managed to thwart Dragging Canoe at the Battle of Island Flats (at modern Kingsport) on July 20. The following day, a Cherokee contingent led by Old Abraham of Chilhowee reached Fort Watauga. The Wataugans, led by John Carter, James Robertson, and John Sevier, were well-prepared, having been warned of the invasion by Nancy Ward. Ward also used her powers as a Cherokee Beloved Woman to spare the life of Lydia Russell Bean (wife of early settler William Bean), who had been captured during the invasion and had been sentenced to be burned at the stake. The Cherokee laid siege to Fort Watauga for about two weeks before retreating. A relief force led by William Christian arrived at Fort Watauga a few weeks later and attacked the Overhill towns. The following year, the Cherokee signed the Treaty of Long Island, ceding the Sycamore Shoals area to the United States.

=== The Overmountain Men ===
In 1776, the Washington District sent a petition to the North Carolina Assembly asking to be annexed. In November of that year, North Carolina agreed, and the district was admitted to the state as Washington County. Washington County militiamen, who along with the Holston and Southwest Virginia militiamen comprised a frontier militia known as the Overmountain Men, took part in various engagements throughout the war, including the Siege of Charleston (historian Samuel Cole Williams dubbed the siege's Washington County participants the first "volunteers" of Tennessee) and the Battle of Musgrove Mill. In late 1780, Major Patrick Ferguson led an army of loyalists into the Appalachian Mountains to cover Cornwallis' invasion of North Carolina. Ferguson sent a message to the frontiersmen in Southwest Virginia and northeast Tennessee, ordering them to give up their arms or face destruction.

On September 25, a force of 400 Virginians led by William Campbell, 240 Sullivan Countians led by Isaac Shelby, and 240 Washington Countians led by John Sevier gathered at Sycamore Shoals. After being supplied with food, money, and gunpowder by locals, the force marched across the Appalachian Mountains, linking up with several North Carolina and South Carolina militias along the way. On October 7, the Overmountain Men engaged and defeated Ferguson's loyalists at the Battle of Kings Mountain. The Overmountain Men suffered less than 100 casualties while killing 157 in the loyalist force (including Ferguson), wounding 163, and capturing another 698. The victory forced Cornwallis to temporarily abandon his invasion of North Carolina.

== Sycamore Shoals State Historic Park ==
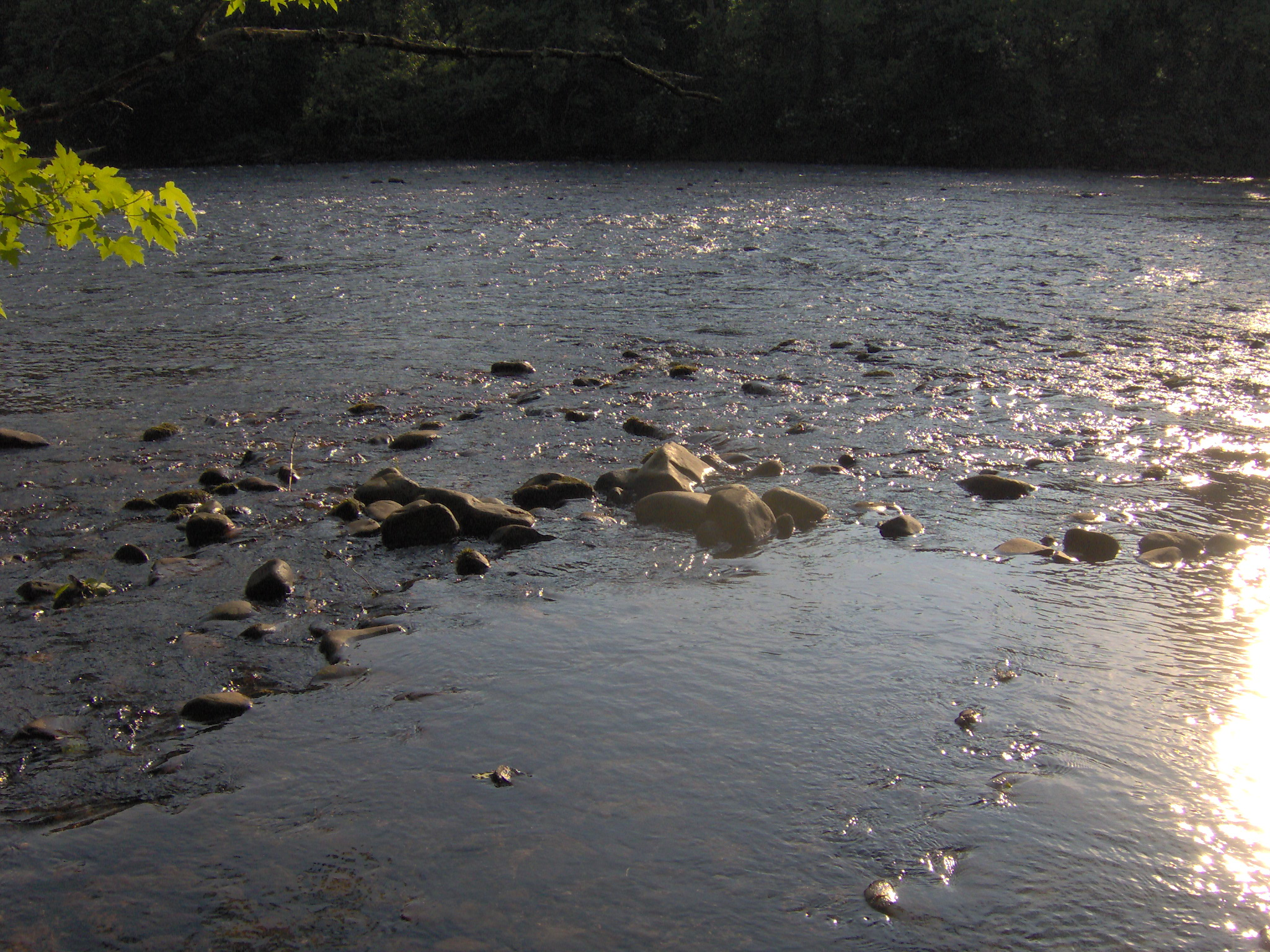
Sycamore Shoals, viewed from just off the Mountain River Trail

In the 20th century, various entities began to acknowledge the importance of Sycamore Shoals in the history of Tennessee and the Trans-Appalachian frontier. In 1909, the Daughters of the American Revolution placed an obelisk, constructed from local river rock and set on a concrete base, at the intersection of West G Street and Monument Place in Elizabethton, one half-mile from the mouth of Gap Creek at Watauga River, where Tennessee historian J. G. M. Ramsey recorded within his Annals of Tennessee as where Fort Watauga had once stood.

In 1964, Sycamore Shoals was designated a National Historic Landmark, and it was placed on the National Register of Historic Places in 1966. As part of the United States Bicentennial celebrations, the state of Tennessee decided to reconstruct Fort Watauga. The state purchased Sycamore Shoals, a small island within the shoals, and an undeveloped stretch of land along the south bank of the Watauga River for the reconstructed fort and the accompanying state park that would interpret it and maintain the shoals. Sycamore Shoals State Historic Park opened in 1975. In 1980, the U.S. Congress appropriated funds for the creation of the Overmountain Victory National Historic Trail, which connects Sycamore Shoals with Kings Mountain National Military Park.

Today, Sycamore Shoals State Historic Park hosts various annual reenactments regarding the siege of Fort Watauga and the mustering of the Overmountain Men. A walking trail follows the south bank of the Watauga, allowing easy access to the Sycamore Shoals, with various interpretive signs explaining the various historical events along the way. In recent years, the relatively low waters along the shoals (which are easy to wade across) have become a popular spot for fly fishing.

== See also ==
- List of National Historic Landmarks in Tennessee
- National Register of Historic Places listings in Carter County, Tennessee
