= Jane Thomas (American Revolution) =

- Born: Jane Black c. 1720; Chester County, Pennsylvania
- Died: April 16, 1811 (aged 90–91); Greenville District (now Greenville, South Carolina)
- Known for: Brave contributions during the American Revolutionary War
- Spouse: Col. John Thomas, Sr.

Jane Thomas (c. 1720–April 16, 1811) was the wife of John Thomas, a colonel in South Carolina who fought for the rebels in the American Revolution. She passed key intelligence that thwarted an ambush of Whig forces.

William J. Bennett and John T. E. Cribb state that Jane Thomas' intervention before "the Battle of Cedar Springs helped launch a resurgence of Patriot fortunes in South Carolina, and brought a much-needed boost in morale." Markers were erected to honor Jane and her husband Col. John Thomas for their contributions during the American Revolution. A monument was installed by the Greenville County Historical Preservation Commission and Mark III Properties and a highway marker was installed by the Spartanburg Chapter of the Daughters of the American Revolution.

== Background ==
Men and women of the Thirteen Colonies were essentially tested throughout the American Revolutionary War (1775–1783) as to what side had their allegiance. Loyalists aligned with the British and the English King George III. Patriots, also called rebels, were dedicated in the opposition to being ruled by the British. For them, the conflict was a War of Independence. Colonialist's allegiances could be decided by their means of income, for example, if their livelihoods relied on trade with England, they might then have more loyalty to The Crown.

In the Province of South Carolina, like other colonies, people were essentially at war with their neighbors. The Thomas family—Jane, John, their children, and their children's spouses were all patriots. After the Fall of Charleston (May 12, 1780) the infighting became more fierce in South Carolina. British General Charles Cornwallis had the mission to take control of Carolina. Leaders of the patriots in South Carolina created and distributed Articles of Association to identify and obtain the signatures of the people who would fight against the British government. The Thomas family, including their sons-in-law, were committed to protecting their homes and to fight against the Loyalists.

In the last few years of the war, life became very difficult. Loyalists had stole livestock, ruined crops, and set fire to barns. Women and children did not have the food and clothes that they needed.

When small numbers are involved, a few deaths have as much impact as hundreds or thousands when

armies clash, and the significance is magnified when those involved are friends and neighbors and kin, some on one side, some on the other. This kind of fighting would go on for almost two years, and not

all were small fights—some backwoods encounters would involve hundreds of men on each side.

— John Buchanan, The Road to Guilford Courthouse: The American Revolution in the Carolinas

Colonel Patrick Ferguson particularly focused on a relentless campaign against the Thomas family and the patriots that were loyal to them. Ferguson's troops stole their livestock, took their enslaved people, and stole or destroyed their possessions.

== Early life ==
Jane Black, the daughter of Annabelle (Waters) and Robert Black, was born about 1720. She was a native of Chester County, Pennsylvania and the sister of Reverend John Black, of Carlisle, the first president of Dickinson College. She was married about 1740, to John Thomas, becoming Jane Thomas. John also grew up in Chester County and he is thought to have been a native of Wales.

== South Carolina ==
John Thomas received a land grant in 1754 for 600 acres in what was then Anson County in the Province of North Carolina (now York County, South Carolina). They traveled along the Great Wagon Road for 800 miles (1,300 km) and settled in the Camden District along Fishing Creek, south of the Catawba River. (Note: They were also said to have first settled along Fishing Creek in the Chester District in 1755.) Thomas and her family attended the Fishing Creek Presbyterian Church.

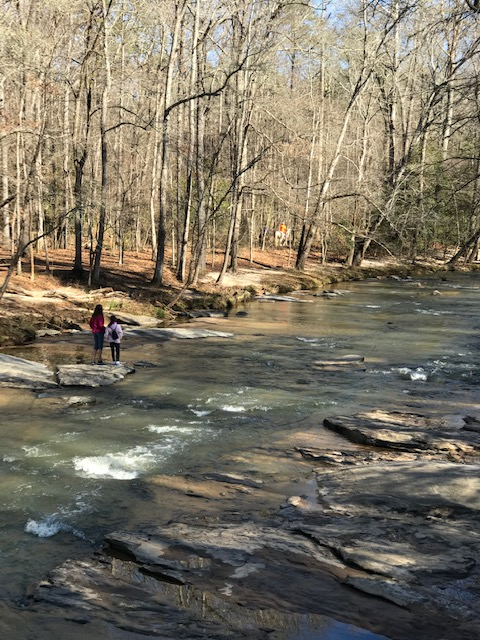
Fairforest Creek

In 1762, they moved to what is now Spartanburg County, South Carolina, settling near where Fairforest Creek is met by Kelsey Creek. (Note: The approximate area where Kelsey Creek meets up with Fairforest Creek is 34°51′21″N 81°49′43″W.) Thomas was one of the first members of the Fairforest Presbyterian Church, the church that she was affiliated with for much of the rest of her life. The building was made of logs in the 1770s. Thomas and her husband owned enslaved people.

== Revolutionary War ==
John Thomas was a magistrate and a captain of the militia, for many years. He resigned from both positions before the outbreak of the Revolutionary War. John Thomas was elected Colonel of the Spartan Regiment, operating close to the frontier and involving significant amounts of active service. Colonel Thomas led his regiment into a battle with Native Americans in 1776. When that campaign ended, and the Native Americans sued for peace, Thomas was entrusted with the protection of a long section of the frontier. He retained his command until after the fall of Charleston.

As soon as the news of the surrender of Charleston reached the borders of the State, Thomas and other colonels drew up plans to concentrate their forces to protect the country. They were impeded in this by Colonel Fletcher, who remained in the area, and informed some British troops who had recently arrived in the area, as well as a loyalist cavalry regiment 30 miles (48 km). These forces were united, and surprised Colonel Brandon's (Note: This could also be Col. Thomas Brandon of the 2nd Spartan Regiment.) forces at the meeting point before the others arrived. Within a short time, almost every patriot between the Broad and Saluda Rivers was forced to abandon the country or accept British protection, with many of them fleeing to North Carolina.

=== Attack by Tories ===
The Torys who lived in the area were encouraged to make life difficult for the patriots, who were subject to attacks, having their property stolen, and their houses destroyed. Colonel Patrick Ferguson, a British officer, incited such behavior and became directly involved in the activity.

On hearing that a large party was approaching to seize the ammunition that Gov. John Rutledge had entrusted to his keeping, Col. Thomas fled with his band of twenty-five men, taking with him a part of the powder. Two men and two women were left in charge of the house, which was attacked by the Tories. The two men were her son-in-law Josiah Culbertson (Martha's husband) and her son William. The other women were her daughters. Thomas and her grown children loaded the guns for Culbertson, and a continual firing was kept up until the assailants withdrew, believing that there were more men at Thomas's house. It is said that the ammunition that she saved was the main supply for Thomas Sumter's command in the Battle of Rocky Mount (August 1, 1780) and Battle of Hanging Rock (August 6, 1780).

At the Thomases' house, Ferguson took what he could, including enslaved people, household goods, and their livestock. The result was that anything that the soldiers could carry away was taken, and they attempted to destroy their home and farm.

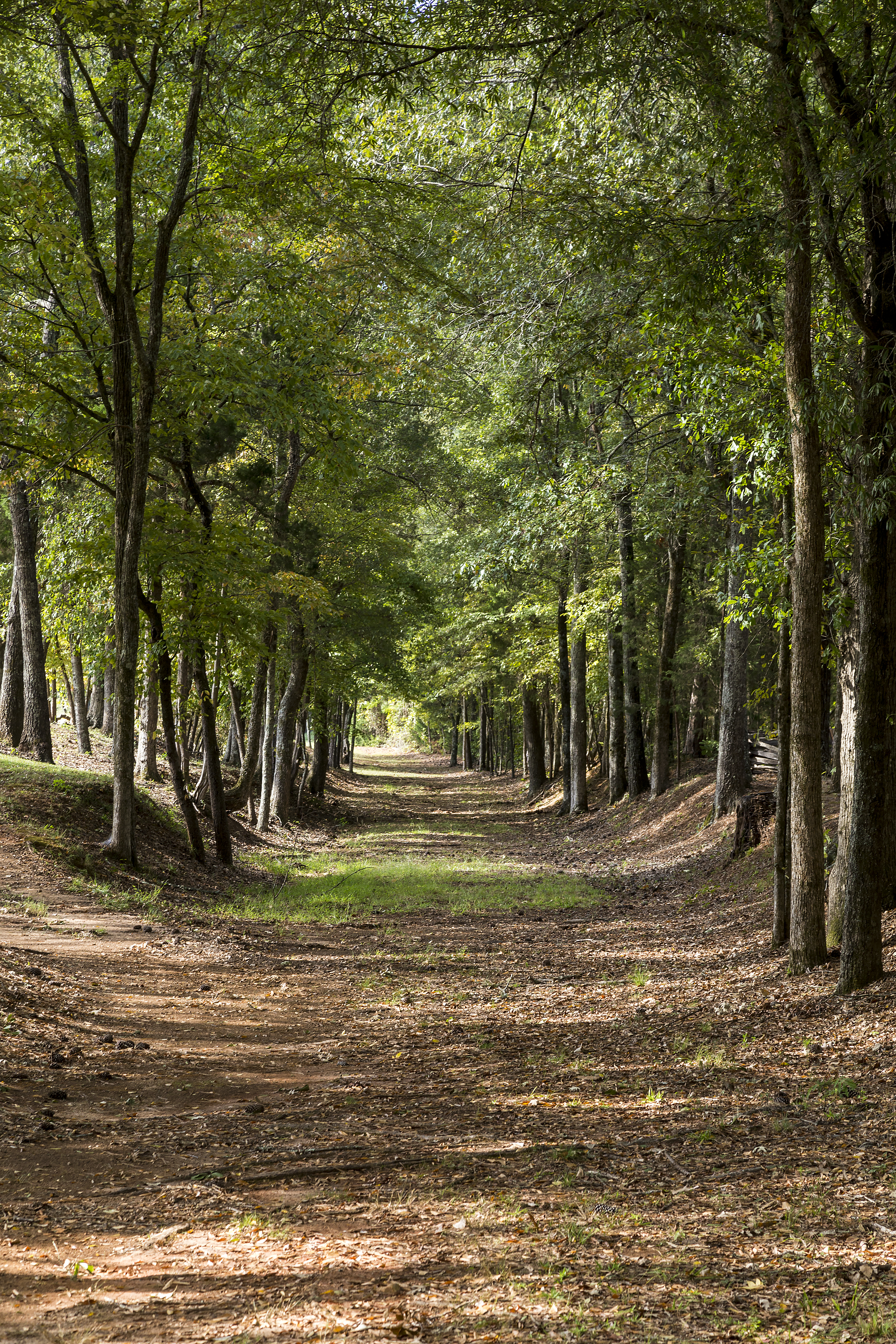
The old Island Ford Road at Ninety-Six National Historic Site, South Carolina

Colonel Thomas was captured. Too old to flee, he was forced to accept protection, hoping to be allowed to live with his family. However, he was arrested and imprisoned at Ninety Six, as were her sons Abram and Robert. The men suffered from poor, minimal food and disease. Jane was allowed to bring supplies to her husband and sons. Abram died there.

=== Ambush at Cedar Springs ===
While visiting her husband and two sons in Ninety Six, Thomas overheard a conversation between some Tory women, hearing one of them say: "To-morrow night the loyalists intend to surprise the rebels, at Cedar Spring." The Spartan regiment that was posted at the Cedar Springs were led by her son John Thomas, Jr. after her husband Col. Thomas was captured. On July 12, 1780, the day after hearing the news Jane Thomas resolved to notify the rebels of the news, and left quickly from Ninety Six, riding 60 miles to relay the information to her son of the impending attack. She arrived at night, having evaded the enemy.

The rebels were therefore able to prepare measures for self-defense, withdrawing to the surrounding woods a short distance from their campfires, which were prepared to burn as brightly as possible. At that point, they heard from a distance the loyalist forces approaching their camp by stealth. When they reached the camp, apparently without being detected, the loyalist forces attacked, expecting to carry out an ambush. However, thanks to Jane Thomas's information, the patriot forces were able to open fire from their secure positions, and thus inflicted heavy casualties on the attacking army. In this way, 60 patriots were able to repel and roundly defeat an attacking force of around 150 loyalists. The men of the Spartan Regiment had become downtrodded by the events of the war, but this win followed by the news of another group of patriots' success at Huck's retreat, which occurred that night about 50 miles (80 km) away, improved their morale.

Col. Thomas was transferred from Ninety-Six to Charleston, where he remained until near the close of the war.

== Personal life ==
Thomas had nine children, and her sons and sons-in-law were active soldiers:

- Her eldest son Col. John Thomas, Jr. rose during the war from the rank of captain to succeed his father in the command of the Spartan regiment, commanding at the Battle of Cowpens, among others.
- Capt. Robert Thomas, another son, was killed in Roebuck's defeat at the Battle of Mudlick Creek.
- Abram, who was wounded and captured at Ninety Six, died in enemy imprisonment.
- William was also a soldier, wounded at the Battle of Mudlick Creek. He, his mother, and his sisters protected their house from an attack by the Loyalists.
- Martha, one of the daughters, married Josiah Culbertson, who received a captain's commission towards the close of the war.
- Ann married Joseph McJunkin, who entered the military as a private aged 20 and rose to the rank of major by 1780.
- Jane, the third daughter, married Captain Joseph McCool or McCoal.
- Letitia was the wife of Major James Lusk.
- Esther married Robert Carter.

After the end of the war, in 1785, John and Jane Thomas moved to Greenville district (now Greenville, South Carolina), where they lived the rest of their lives. They both died in 1811, Jane on April 16, as was published in her obituary in the Carolina Gazette. Her husband died later than year.

== Legacy ==
The Spartanburg Chapter of the Daughters of the American Revolution erected a monument for "Col. John Thomas and his wife Jane Thomas" at White Stone, South Carolina, recognizing both as heroes of the American Revolutionary War.

A marker for "Col. John and Jane Thomas" is located in Greer, South Carolina. (Note: The marker is located at 34°59′44″N 82°16′39″W.) It was erected by the Greenville County Historical Preservation Commission and Mark III Properties in 2019. For Jane, the marker says,

Jane Black Thomas was also a staunch whig. Learning of British plans to attack patriots at Cedar Spring, she rushed the intelligence to American forces. As a result, the patriots were able to spring an ambush. She boldly defended a cache of weapons stored in their place. Both John and Jane Thomas are buried here, in sight of their home, later owned by S.C. Chief Justice John Belton O'Neall.

== See also ==
- Katharine Steel, another notable woman from the Fishing Creek area during the Revolutionary War

== Sources ==
- Ellet, Elizabeth Fries (1849). The Women of the American Revolution. Original from the New York Public Library: Baker and Scribner. pp. 250–262.
- Ingle, Sheila (2022). "South Carolina Biography: Revolutionary Women: Jane Black Thomas" (PDF). South Carolina American Revolution Sestercentennial Commission. Archived from the original (PDF) on 2023-04-03.
