= Fishing Creek =

Fishing Creek may refer to a location in the United States:

== Communities ==
- Fishing Creek, Maryland, an unincorporated community and census-designated place in Dorchester County
- Fishing Creek Township, Columbia County, Pennsylvania
- Fishing Creek Township, Granville County, North Carolina, in North Carolina
- Fishing Creek Township, Warren County, North Carolina, in North Carolina

== Waterbodies ==
=== Delaware ===
- Fishing Creek (Blackbird Creek tributary), a tributary of Blackbird Creek in New Castle County

=== Maryland ===
- Fishing Creek (Maryland), a tributary of Little Choptank River along the Chesapeake Bay Eastern Shore
- Fishing Creek (Monocacy River), in the watershed of the Potomac River

=== Missouri ===
- Fishing Creek (Missouri), a tributary of the South Grand River

=== New Jersey ===
- Fishing Creek (Delaware Bay), a tributary of the Delaware River in New Jersey

=== North Carolina ===
- Fishing Creek (Catawba River), in the Santee River watershed in List of rivers of North Carolina
- Fishing Creek (North Carolina), a tributary of the Tar River in North Carolina

=== Pennsylvania ===
- Fishing Creek (Bald Eagle Creek), in Clinton County, Pennsylvania
- Fishing Creek (North Branch Susquehanna River), in Columbia County, Pennsylvania
  - East Branch Fishing Creek, a tributary in Columbia and Sullivan Counties
  - Little Fishing Creek, a tributary in Columbia, Lycoming, and Sullivan Counties
  - West Branch Fishing Creek, a tributary in Columbia and Sullivan Counties
- Fishing Creek (Susquehanna River) (east bank), in Dauphin County, Pennsylvania
  - Fishing Creek (Perry County) (west bank Susquehanna River), in Pennsylvania
  - Fishing Creek (York County), in Pennsylvania

=== South Carolina ===
- Fishing Creek (Catawba River), in the Santee River watershed in List of rivers of South Carolina where the Battle of Fishing Creek was fought in 1780

=== West Virginia ===
- Fishing Creek (West Virginia), a stream in West Virginia

== See also ==
- Fishing Hawk Creek, a stream in West Virginia
- Fishing River, in Missouri
- Fish River (disambiguation)
- Fisher River (disambiguation)
