= John Thomas (colonel) =

American Revolutionary War military officer

- Born: 1720; Wales, Great Britain
- Died: 1811 or 1812 (aged c. 91) Greenville, South Carolina, United States
- Allegiance: 1755 (Great Britain); 1775 (United Colonies)
- Service years: 1755, 1775
- Conflicts: French and Indian War; Battle of the Monongahela; American Revolutionary War
- Spouse: Jane Black (m. 1740)
- Children: 5 daughters and 4 sons

John Thomas, Sr. (1720 - 1811 or 1812) was a colonel during the American Revolutionary War who led the Spartan Regiment against the Loyalists. He was a representative of the Provincial Congress in 1776. During the Siege of Charleston, Thomas was captured and was imprisoned at the Ninety Six prison and later at Charleston until the end of the war.

Markers were erected to honor John and his wife Jane Thomas for their contributions during the American Revolution. A monument was installed by the Greenville County Historical Preservation Commission and Mark III Properties and a highway marker was installed by the Spartanburg Chapter of the Daughters of the American Revolution.

== Early life ==
John Newcastle Thomas was born in Wales in 1720. On January 3, 1740, Thomas married Jane Black, both of whom were from Chester County, Pennsylvania.

== French and Indian War ==
Thomas fought at the Battle of the Monongahela under British General Edward Braddock, who was defeated and killed 10 miles (16 km) south of Fort Duquesne, in July 1755. Braddock's troops had fought against Native Americans and French soldiers. As a result of the defeat, the French continued to possess the fort and gained control of the Ohio River Valley.

== South Carolina and Revolutionary War ==
Thomas received a land grant in 1754 for 600 acres in what was then Anson County in the Province of North Carolina (now York County, South Carolina). Seeking wider expanses of available land for himself, his wife, and their children's families, they traveled along the Great Wagon Road for 800 miles (1,300 km). They settled their property in the Camden District along Fishing Creek, south of the Catawba River. (Note: They were also said to have first settled along Fishing Creek in the Chester District of South Carolina in 1755.) In 1762, they moved to what is now Spartanburg, South Carolina, settling in Fairforest Creek. The Thomas family were among the first members of the Fairforest Presbyterian Church. Thomas and his wife had enslaved people.

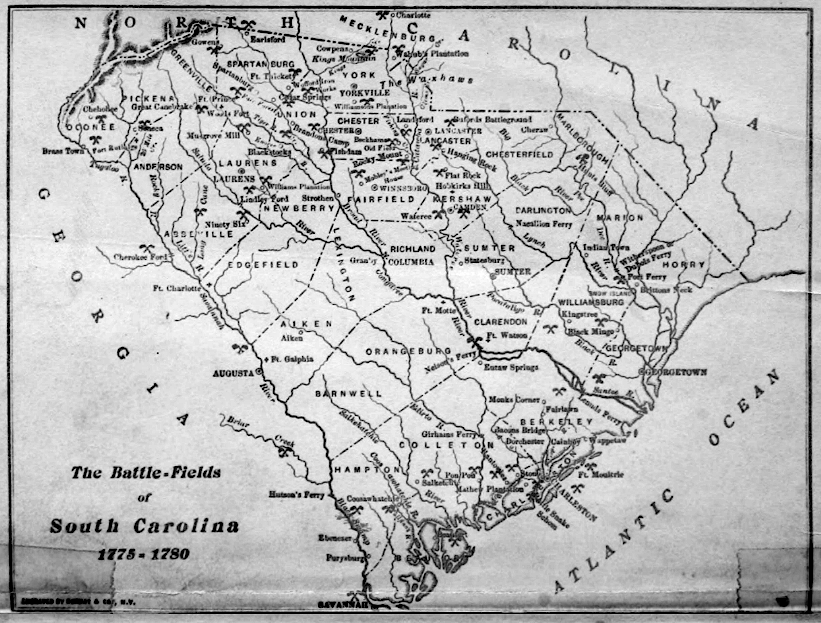
Map of South Carolina Battlefields 1775 - 1780. County Borders are not historical, but seem to predate the publication date a bit (pre 1896).

Thomas served as a captain of the militia and as a magistrate, roles that supported the British. He resigned from those positions at the outbreak of the American Revolutionary War. On June 3, 1775, the Provincial Congress of Carolina met to discuss the breakout of the war in Massachusetts, with the Battles of Lexington and Concord and Bunker Hill. Most of the people in attendance wanted to fight for their independence like the northern patriots. Thomas found himself fighting against his former militia leader, Col. Thomas Fletchall, who was a loyalist or Tory.

On August 21, 1775, he organized the Spartan Regiment, many of whom were members of the Fairforest Presbyterian Church. He had been requested to form the regiment by the Council of Safety. The regiment served at the Snow Campaign in November and December 1775. Parris's Mill in Greenville District was a place where they fought.

His wife passed on key intelligence that thwarted an ambush of Whig forces at Cedar Springs (Battle of Cedar Springs). She succeeded in saving the main supply of ammunition that was used under Thomas Sumter's command in the Battle of Rocky Mount and Battle of Hanging Rock.

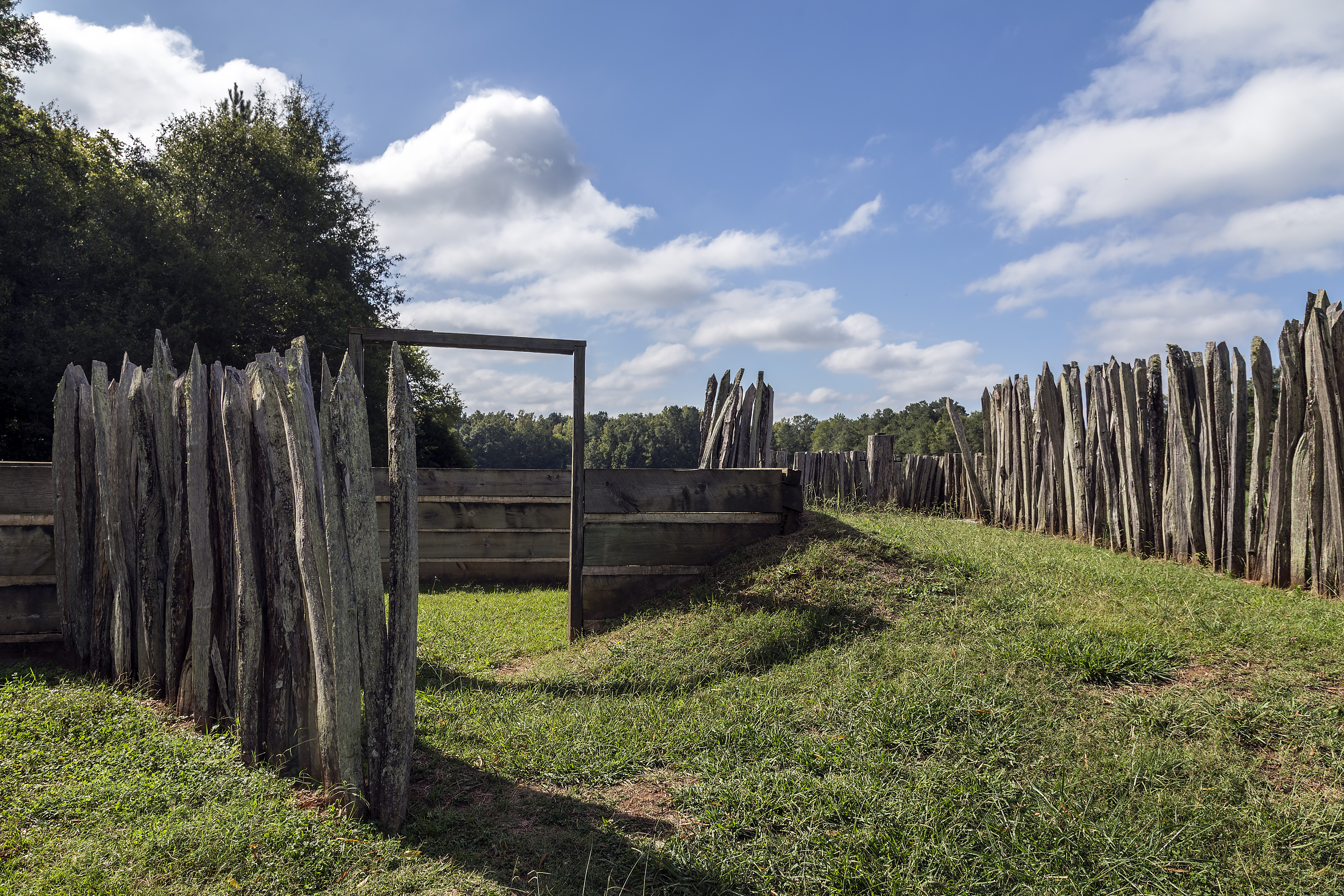
Ninety Six stockage fort

In 1776, he was a representative of the Provincial Congress. During the fall of Charleston in May 1780, Thomas was captured by Capt. Sam Brown and was sent to the Ninety Six prison, as were his sons Abram and Robert. The Americans held at the prison suffered from lack of sufficient, edible food. They were subject to disease, but did not have medical care. Abram died there. As the war continued, Thomas was moved to Charleston. He was released at the end of the Revolution.

== Personal life ==
Thomas had nine children, and his sons and sons-in-law were active soldiers:

- His eldest son Col. John Thomas, Jr. rose during the war from the rank of captain to succeed his father in the command of the Spartan regiment, commanding at the Battle of Cowpens, among others.
- Capt. Robert Thomas, another son, was killed in Roebuck's defeat at the Battle of Mudlick Creek.
- Abram, who was wounded and captured at Ninety Six, died in enemy imprisonment.
- William was also a soldier, wounded at the Battle of Mudlick Creek. He, his mother, and his sisters protected their house from an attack by the Loyalists.
- Martha, one of the daughters, married Josiah Culbertson, who received a captain's commission towards the close of the war.
- Ann married Joseph McJunkin, who entered the military as a private aged 20, and rose to the rank of major by 1780.
- Jane, the third daughter, married Captain Joseph McCool or McCoal.
- Letitia was the wife of Major James Lusk.
- Esther married Robert Carter.

Soon after the end of the war, John and Jane Thomas moved to Greenville district (now Greenville, South Carolina), where they lived the rest of their lives. He died in the Greenville District of Spartanburg County, South Carolina on May 2, 1811, or 1812. The couple was buried in Greer, South Carolina. South Carolina Chief Justice John Belton O'Neall later owned their house.

== Legacy ==
A marker for "Col. John and Jane Thomas" is located in Greer, South Carolina. (Note: The marker is located at 34°59′44″N 82°16′39″W.) It was erected by the Greenville County Historical Preservation Commission and Mark III Properties in 2019. For John, the marker says,

John [and] Jane Black Thomas emigrated to S.C. c.1755 from Chester Co., PA. John was a local magistrate and militia captain. As the Revolutionary War began, he was elected Colonel of the Spartan Regiment. Captured in 1779, he was held in Ninety Six and Charleston up to the end of the war. Returning to the upstate, John farmed here till his death [on] October 2, 1811.

The Spartanburg Chapter of the Daughters of the American Revolution erected a monument for "Col. John Thomas and his wife Jane Thomas" at White Stone, South Carolina, recognizing both as heroes of the American Revolutionary War.

== Sources ==
- Ellet, Elizabeth Fries (1849). The Women of the American Revolution. Original from the New York Public Library: Baker and Scribner. pp. 250–262.
- Ingle, Sheila (2022). "South Carolina Biography: Revolutionary Women: Jane Black Thomas" (PDF). South Carolina American Revolution Sestercentennial Commission.
