= Rosanna Waters Farrow =

American Revolutionary War heroine

Rosanna Farrow (née Waters; June 1, 1734-1800) was an American Revolutionary War heroine. During the war, Rosanna Waters Farrow saved three of her sons from being executed by the British.

== Family and Background ==
Rosanna Waters was born on June 1, 1734, in Prince William County, Virginia, to Philemon Waters and Sarah Bordroyne. She was the twin sister of Philemon Waters, Jr., who served in the French and Indian War and the American Revolutionary War.

Rosanna Waters married John Thomas Farrow. Around 1764, the Farrow family moved to present-day Spartanburg, South Carolina, along the Enoree River. In 1776, John Thomas Farrow died of smallpox on his way home from a trip to Virginia. Rosanna and John Thomas Farrow would have eight children:

1. Sarah Farrow (1752-1796) married American Revolutionary War soldier Thomas Miles who fought in the Battle of Cowpens
2. Thomas Farrow (1755-1843) married three times, was wounded in the hip in the Battle of Cowpens
3. John Farrow (1757-1843) remained as a guard for his brother Thomas after he was wounded
4. Landon Farrow (1759-1799) was captured and aboard a prison ship in Charleston
5. Samuel Farrow (1762-1824) fought at the Battle of Musgrove Mill
6. Mary Farrow (1764-1843) married John James Clayton
7. Jane Farrow (1768-1828) married Spencer Bobo
8. William Farrow (1771-1852)

== American Revolutionary War Heroine ==
After her husband's death in 1776, Rosanna Waters Farrow was left to raise eight children on her own. Their home was in an area surrounded by Tory neighbors, and after her older sons went off to fight, Rosanna and her younger children were left unprotected. She was proud though, to have four of her sons fighting for liberty and independence. Back at home, Rosanna and her daughters often had to hide food, and slept with pistols or weapons under their pillows in the chance that they might need them.

One night in 1780, the Farrow household was awoken by a voice at their gate that informed them that three of the Farrow sons had been captured by the British and were imprisoned at the Ninety-Six District, South Carolina. Hearing that the British Colonel John Cruger would be willing to release her sons in exchange for British prisoners, Rosanna Waters Farrow sprung into action. She gave her daughters directions to keep the windows and doors closed, and to allow no one except friends into the home. She grabbed a rifle, saddled the one remaining horse on the property, and rode off into the darkness of the night to rescue her sons. She arrived at the patriot camp, and petitioned James Williams (Revolutionary War) to grant her six of the captured British soldiers and a guard to make the exchange. He granted her this request, and she set off towards the British camp. Rosanna was just in time, as the British were preparing to hang her sons at sunrise. It is reported that at the close of the exchange Rosanna Waters Farrow told Colonel John Cruger "I have given you two for one, Colonel Cruger, but understand that I consider it the best trade I ever made, for rest assured hereafter the 'Farrow boys' will whip you four to one."
