= Jane Thomas =

Jane Thomas may refer to:

- Jane Thomas (American Revolution) (c. 1720–1811), passed intelligence that thwarted an ambush in the American Revolution
- Jane Thomas (actress) (1899–1976), American film actress
- Jane Thomas (tennis) (born 1966), American tennis player
- Jane Resh Thomas (1936–2023), American children's writer

== See also ==
- Jane Thomas-Oates (born 1960), British chemist
