= Katharine Steel =

American pioneer (1725–1785)

- Born: Katharine Fisher; 1725; Pennsylvania
- Died: 1785 (aged 59–60); Fishing Creek region, South Carolina
- Other names: Katy of the Fort; Witty Katy of the Fort

Katharine Steel lived in on the edge of Euro-American settlement in the Colony of South Carolina. When the Revolutionary War broke out, she urged her sons to fight against the British.

== Biography ==
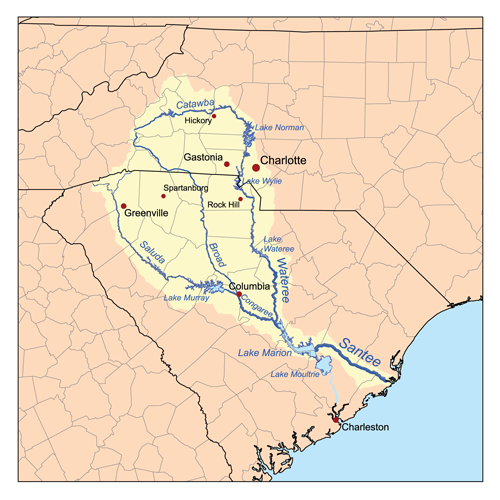
The Steels lived about one mile from the Catawba River, along Fishing Creek, south of Charlotte and near Waxhaw, North Carolina.

Katharine Fisher was born in Pennsylvania about 1725 of Scottish-Irish ancestry, whose family had immigrated to the colonies from Ulster. She was described as being "good-natured and fun-loving", traits that she had throughout her life. She married Thomas Steel, who also descends from Scottish-Irish people from Ulster, in 1745 and they lived in Pennsylvania. She became Katharine Steel. (Note: The historical sketch prepared by the Daughters of the American Revolution stated that she was 28 years of age when she married. The Greens stated that she was 20 when she married.) The couple had three daughters and two sons. The Steel family moved to the wilderness of the Province of South Carolina, living about one mile from the Catawba River, along Fishing Creek. At first, they had occasional visits from the Catawba people, but lived remotely from other settlers. Thomas traded with the Cherokee. After a couple of years, John Gaston lived about one mile away along the creek. Their families, especially their sons, became close friends.

Concerned about attacks from the Cherokee people, Thomas built a blockhouse for safety. Sometimes the men left the stronghold, called Steel's Fort, to maintain their crops or fight Native Americans. Steel, nicknamed Witty Katy of the fort, was a good marksman and had other characteristics, like intelligence and courage, that made her the leader of the fort. She had a calming influence that helped the women and children wait out the time until they could return to their homes. Steel taught her daughters how to fire rifles.

John McDaniel had a family of nine living at Rock Creek. They were attacked by the Cherokee and John and his wife were killed. Their nine children were taken and Thomas led a group of people to claim the children, and they were returned to their uncle, Hugh McDaniel. Steel made it her mission to ensure that families were safe near and far away. She checked in on families as far away as 90 90 miles (140 km) to the north in the Yadkin River area. During those times, she left her baby with Robert Brown who lived about 12 miles (19 km) to the north. She was particularly concerned for women who were left alone when their husbands were away. She rode up to 100 miles (160 km) a day through the wilderness to check on other settlers.

Thomas died when during a journey to the Mississippi River to trade goods in 1763 or 1764. He had been gone for a year with Stephen White and James Hemphill, who returned safely. In 1775, Cherokee warriors attacked settlers, and one of Steel's sons John led a company of militiamen, including the sons of John Gaston, in a battle against the Cherokee. They fought together at Fort Moultrie (near Charleston, South Carolina) and further battles against the British during the Revolutionary War. John became a favorite of General Thomas Sumter after he saved the leader from capture. John was called the "Murat of the Catawba" during the Revolutionary War. Steel urged her 17-year-old son Thomas to join the war as a patriot. Thomas served with his brother.

John Steel was at his mother's house when a group of Torys intended to ambush him. Steel saw the soldiers and shouted about their arrival. John as able to get on his horse and safely ride away, but several of his men were killed. They had been standing near Steel, and although her dress had four bullet holes, she was not injured. The Tories set Steel's house on fire. Some of John's men made it safely to General Sumter, but some of his men were captured.

Steel died in 1784 at the old blockhouse. John was to have inherited all of his father's property, according to the laws at the time, but instead, the land was divided up among the five children. The three daughters and their husbands received large parcels of land. Margaret was married to William Wylie. Mary was married to Robert Archer. And, Nancy was married to Thomas Bell. John received his share of the subdivided land, which included the homestead. Thomas also received his share.

Considered a heroine of the Revolutionary War, a chapter of the Daughters of the American Revolution was named after her in 1906.

== See also ==
- Battle of Fishing Creek, an American Revolutionary War battle fought on August 18, 1780
- Jane Thomas (American Revolution), Revolutionary War heroine from Chester County, South Carolina
- Morgan Bryan, early Colonial settlement of the Forks of Yadkin area
- Rebecca Boone, granddaughter of Morgan Bryan and wife of Daniel Boone

== Sources ==
- Green, Harry Clinton; Green, Mary Wolcott (1912). The pioneer mothers of America; a record of the more notable women of the early days of the country, and particularly of the colonial and revolutionary periods. New York : G. P. Putnam's Sons.
