= 2nd Spartan Regiment =

- Active: 1778-1782
- Type: Militia
- Engagements: Battle of Stono Ferry; Battle of Camden; Battle of Musgrove Mill; Battle of King's Mountain; Battle of Cowpens; Siege of Ninety-Six

Commanders
- Commander: Colonel Thomas Brandon

The 2nd Spartan Regiment was a South Carolina militia unit during the American Revolution that was split from the Spartan Regiment in 1778. It was commanded by Colonel Thomas Brandon. The unit is sometimes referred to as the Fairforest Regiment.

The 2nd Spartans fought in the Southern theater of the American Revolutionary War in campaigns in Georgia as well as many of the important battles in the backcountry of South and North Carolina. Col. Brandon was noted for his role in preparing the location for the Battle of Blackstock's Farm. At the Battle of Cowpens they participated under Colonel Andrew Pickens as part of the militia line that feigned retreat.

The flag of the regiment has been preserved at the Museum of the American Revolution, one of only half a dozen such flags from the South that still exist.
