= Battle of Cedar Springs =

1780 American Revolutionary War conflict

- Part of the American Revolutionary War
| Date | July 12, 1780 and August 1780 |
| Location | Spartanburg County, South Carolina |

Belligerents
| United States | Great Britain |

Battle of Cedar Springs, also called the Battle of Cedar Spring reportedly skirmishes that happened twice near what is now Spartanburg, South Carolina during the American Revolutionary War. The first happened on July 12, 1780, and there is a question about whether that happened at all, or if so on that night and site. Another Battle of Cedar Springs occurred at a different site.

== First Battle of Cedar Springs ==
A group of 150 Tory militiamen, led by British Maj. Patrick Ferguson, planned to attack the Spartan Regiment, led by Col. John Thomas, Jr., at their encampment at Cedar Springs on July 12, 1780. According to a long-standing and well-documented legend, Thomas and his soldiers, most of whom were members of the Fair Forest Presbyterian Church, were notified about the plans by Jane Thomas. She was the wife of Col. John Thomas, Sr., who was imprisoned at Ninety Six, and the mother of Col. John Thomas, Jr. Having overheard two loyalists discuss the plan when she visited her husband at Ninety Six, she was compelled to ride her horse 60 miles (97 km) to Cedar Springs. She met up with her son and told him of the Loyalists' plan to attack during the night. Thomas and his 60 men hid in strategic locations behind and around their campsite, with the intention of surprising the loyalists when they attempted to attack the patriots. There was a short skirmish, during which John White, a loyalist was killed. Thomas and his men went to join Thomas Sumter and 35 loyalists went to Gowen's Old Fort, an encampment of loyalist militia men. The fate of the other loyalists from the skirmish is not known. The First Battle of Cedar Springs has been described as the first in a series of events that led to the Battle of King's Mountain. Its site is among those included in the Revolutionary War Trail, a driving tour around Spartanburg. A monument is located near the Cedar Spring Baptist Church in Spartanburg.

Two days later, on the night of July 14, 1780, Col. John Jones and his men attacked and took control of Gowen's Old Fort. This event, said to have followed the First Battle of Cedar Springs, was described as follows,

As they passed through the disaffected country, they pretended to be a company of loyalists, engaged in the king's service; and in many instances were furnished with pilots, under that impression. When they had passed the head waters of Saluda River, one of these guides informed them, that 'a party of rebels had attacked some loyalists the preceding night, a short distance in front, and defeated them.' Jones expressed a wish to be conducted to the place, that he might join the loyalists, and have it in his power to take revenge for the blood of the king’s subjects which had been selected to pursue the Americans who had retreated to the north. About eleven o'clock on the night of the 14th of July, Jones was conducted to the royal party, where about forty were collected.

— Lyman Draper, author of King's Mountain and Its Heroes (Note: Draper's account was based upon three sources, "McCall's Georgia... Frank Moore's Diary of the American Revolution, and two diary entries from British Lt. Anthony Allaire, an officer in the Loyal American Regiment.") Conner Runyan questions the conclusions that Draper made from the three sources, specifically regarding dates and places that were discussed from these three sources.

The incident described as "a party of rebels had attacked some loyalists the preceding night" could also be in reference to Huck's Defeat of July 12, 1780. Major Joseph McJunkin, a son-in-law of Jane Thomas, had said that there were three conflicts in or near Cedar Springs based upon the 1837 The Memoirs of Major Joseph McJunkin compiled by his grandson-in-law. The three conflicts near the Battle of Cedar Springs could refer to two skirmishes (rather than three) that happened near the site of the Second Battle of Cedar Springs.

== Second Battle of Cedar Springs ==
The Second Battle of Cedar Springs, also called the Battle of Wofford's Iron Work, occurred in August 1780. It occurred near the site of the first battle. British Major Ferguson and his troops, who were generally on foot, came to Wofford's Iron Works to fight patriots led by Col. Clarke and Col. Shelby. The loyalists had a hard time fighting against the patriots that were on horseback at the site near Lawsons Fork Creek. The loyalists returned to their camp at Cedar Springs. The patriots retreated, wanting to avoid Ferguson and his troops after their earlier experiences at the Battle of the Peach Trees. The Wofford's Iron Works building was destroyed in 1781 by "Bloody Bill" Cunningham, an enemy of the patriots. A marker was installed in the general area where the fight is thought to have occurred.
