= Cowpens station =

- Cowpens Depot
- U.S. National Register of Historic Places
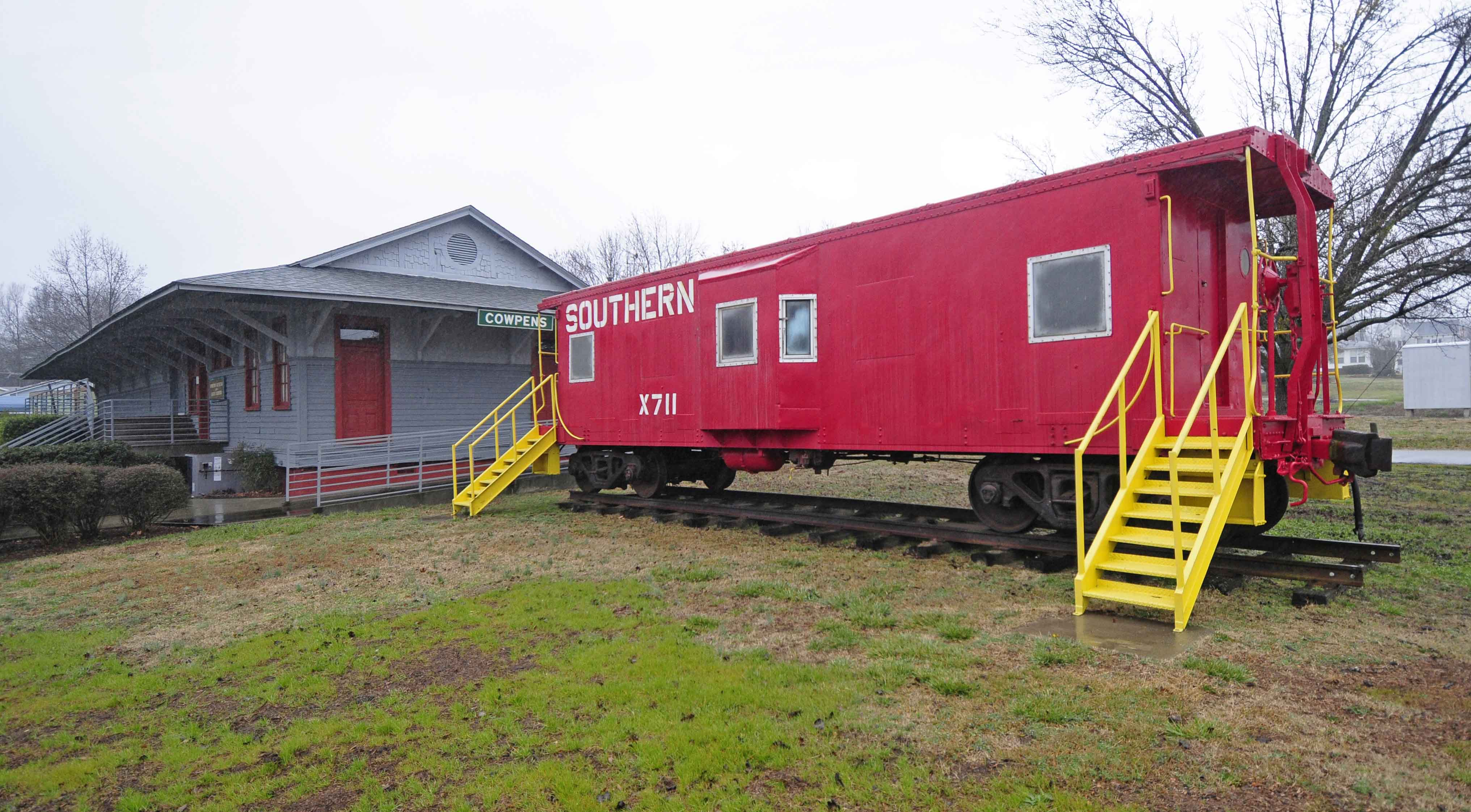
- Cowpens Depot, February 2012

- Location within South Carolina Location within the United States
- Location: 120 Palmetto St., Cowpens, South Carolina
- Coordinates: 35°0′56″N 81°48′10″W
- Area: 2.7 acres (1.1 ha)
- Built: 1896
- Built by: Southern Railway Company
- Architectural style: Late 19th And 20th Century Revivals
- NRHP reference No.: 97001104
- Added to NRHP: September 4, 1997

Cowpens Depot, also known as Cowpens Depot Museum and Civic Center, is a historic train station located at Cowpens, Spartanburg County, South Carolina. It was built in 1896 by the Southern Railway. It is a one-story, rectangular frame building painted gray, with a gable roof and freight loading platform. The depot closed in 1967.

In 1982 the Town of Cowpens moved it from railroad property one block to its present location. The town has an historic railroad car on display by the depot. The depot was listed on the National Register of Historic Places in 1997.

Preceding station	Southern Railway	Following station
Clifton, SC toward Birmingham	Main Line	Thicketty toward Washington, D.C.
