= Jane Thomas-Oates =

British chemist and academic

- Born: 16 May 1960 (age 66)
- Education: Imperial College London
- Scientific career
- Workplaces: University of York; University of Manchester Institute of Science and Technology; University of Dundee; Imperial College London; University of Colorado Boulder
- Thesis: Fast atom bombardment mass spectrometry of oligosaccharides and glycopeptides (1984)
- Doctoral advisor: Anne Dell

Jane E. Thomas-Oates (born 16 May 1960) is a British chemist who is an emeritus professor at the University of York. Her research has considered the development of mass spectrometry for biological applications including proteomics, metabolomics, and glycomics.

== Early life and education ==
Thomas-Oates' parents were both teachers. Her father was a physical chemist before teaching science and her mother was a botanist. She has said that she can remember being excited by mass spectrometry during her chemistry lessons. Thomas-Oates studied biochemistry at Imperial College London, where she remained for a doctorate with Anne Dell. Her doctoral research considered atom bombardment mass spectrometry of oligosaccharides and glycopeptides. She then moved to the United States as a postdoctoral researcher at the University of Colorado Boulder. She worked in the University of Colorado Complex Carbohydrate Research Center and the University of Georgia.

== Research and career ==
In 1986, Thomas-Oates returned to Imperial College London. Her research considered the development of mass spectrometry for biological applications. She was appointed a Beit Memorial Research Fellow at the University of Dundee in 1989, where she spent two years before joining Utrecht University as a lecturer in mass spectrometry. In Dundee, she studied the structures of glycosylphosphatidylinositol anchors, and in Utrecht she developed the first mass spectrometry technique to determine glycan attachment to glycoproteins. In 1996, Thomas-Oates moved to University of Manchester Institute of Science and Technology as a Senior Lecturer. She moved to the University of York as a Research Chair in 2002.

Thomas-Oates was made the British Mass Spectrometry Society lecturer in 2019.

== Selected publications ==
- Michael Buckley; Matthew Collins; Jane Thomas-Oates; Julie C Wilson (1 December 2009). "Species identification by analysis of bone collagen using matrix-assisted laser desorption/ionisation time-of-flight mass spectrometry". Rapid Communications in Mass Spectrometry. 23 (23): 3843–3854. doi:10.1002/rcm.4316. ISSN 0951-4198. PMID 19899187. Wikidata Q30877743. (erratum)
- Irene Kuiper; Ellen L Lagendijk; Russell Pickford; Jeremy P Derrick; Gerda E M Lamers; Jane E Thomas-Oates; Ben J J Lugtenberg; Guido V Bloemberg (1 January 2004). "Characterization of two Pseudomonas putida lipopeptide biosurfactants, putisolvin I and II, which inhibit biofilm formation and break down existing biofilms". Molecular Microbiology. 51 (1): 97–113. doi:10.1046/j.1365-2958.2003.03751.x. ISSN 0950-382X. PMID 14651614. Wikidata Q44677338.
- M Fukuda; E Spooncer; J E Oates; A Dell; J C Klock (1 September 1984). "Structure of sialylated fucosyl lactosaminoglycan isolated from human granulocytes". Journal of Biological Chemistry. 259 (17): 10925–10935. doi:10.1016/s0021-9258(18)90602-2. ISSN 0021-9258. PMID 6432790. Wikidata Q70494199.
