= Cowpens, South Carolina =

- Town
- Flag

- Location of Cowpens in South Carolina
- Coordinates: 35°01′07″N 81°48′15″W
- Country: United States
- State: South Carolina
- County: Spartanburg
- Named after: Hannah's Cow Pens

Government
  - Type: Mayor–council government

Area
  - Total: 2.29 sq mi (5.94 km^{2})
  - Land: 2.29 sq mi (5.94 km^{2})
  - Water: 0 sq mi (0.00 km^{2})
- Elevation: 869 ft (265 m)

Population (2020)
  - Total: 2,023
  - Density: 881.5/sq mi (340.35/km^{2})
- Time zone: UTC-5 (Eastern (EST))
  - Summer (DST): UTC-4 (EDT)
- ZIP code: 29330
- Area codes: 864, 821
- FIPS code: 45-17260
- GNIS feature ID: 2406330
- Website: www.townofcowpens.com

Cowpens is a town in Spartanburg County, South Carolina, United States. As of the 2020 census, Cowpens had a population of 2,023. The town was chartered February 20, 1880, and was incorporated in 1900.

== History ==
The community was named on account of pens for cattle near the original town site.

During the American Revolutionary War, the Battle of Cowpens was fought on January 17, 1781, resulting in a decisive victory for American Patriot forces over British troops commanded by Banastre Tarleton. The battle site is preserved at Cowpens National Battlefield, located 9 miles (14 km) north of town in Cherokee County, near the town of Chesnee. Two ships of the U.S. Navy have been named USS Cowpens in honor of the battle.

The Cowpens Depot, built in 1896, was listed on the National Register of Historic Places in 1997.

== Geography ==
Cowpens lies in the upland Carolina Piedmont region, approximately 9 mi (15 km) from the center of the county seat, Spartanburg.

According to the United States Census Bureau, the town has a total area of 2.3 square miles (6.0 km^{2}), all land.

== Demographics ==
Historical population
Census	Pop.	Note	%±
1880	112		—
1890	349		211.6%
1900	692		98.3%
1910	1,101		59.1%
1920	1,284		16.6%
1930	1,115		−13.2%
1940	1,343		20.4%
1950	1,879		39.9%
1960	2,038		8.5%
1970	2,109		3.5%
1980	2,023		−4.1%
1990	2,176		7.6%
2000	2,279		4.7%
2010	2,162		−5.1%
2020	2,023		−6.4%
U.S. Decennial Census

=== 2020 census ===
Cowpens racial composition
Race	Num.	Perc.
White (non-Hispanic)	1,436	70.98%
Black or African American (non-Hispanic)	354	17.5%
Asian	10	0.49%
Pacific Islander	3	0.15%
Other/Mixed	96	4.75%
Hispanic or Latino	124	6.13%

As of the 2020 United States census, there were 2,023 people, 843 households, and 537 families residing in the town.

=== 2000 census ===
As of the census of 2000, there were 2,279 people, 922 households, and 639 families residing in the town. The population density was 979.3 inhabitants per square mile (378.1/km^{2}). There were 991 housing units at an average density of 425.8 per square mile (164.4/km^{2}). The racial makeup of the town was 75.65% White, 21.37% African American, 0.13% Native American, 2.06% from other races, and 0.79% from two or more races. Hispanic or Latino of any race were 3.25% of the population.

There were 922 households, of which 32.1% had children under the age of 18 living with them, 47.9% were married couples living together, 17.6% had a female householder with no husband present, and 30.6% were non-families. 28.4% of all households were made up of individuals, and 15.4% had someone living alone who was 65 years of age or older. The average household size was 2.45 and the average family size was 3.00.

Age distribution of the population: 26.7% under the age of 18, 8.4% from 18 to 24, 25.9% from 25 to 44, 23.7% from 45 to 64, and 15.3% who were 65 years of age or older. The median age was 37 years. For every 100 females, there were 88.2 males. For every 100 females age 18 and over, there were 81.6 males.

The median income for a household in the town was $30,815, and the median income for a family was $39,387. Males had a median income of $35,978 versus $22,778 for females. The per capita income for the town was $14,847. About 15.6% of families and 17.8% of the population were below the poverty line, including 19.4% of those under age 18 and 16.4% of those age 65 or over.

== Education ==
It is in the Spartanburg School District 3.

Cowpens has a lending library, a branch of the Spartanburg County Public Library.
