= Daniel McJunkin =

American Revolutionary War patriot

Daniel McJunkin (November 30, 1756 – August 27, 1841) was an American Revolutionary War patriot serving in the battle of Kings Mountain, North Carolina.

Daniel McJunkin was the second son of Samuel Caldwell McJunkin and Mary Anne Bogan. He was brother of Major Joseph McJunkin. Daniel married Jane Chesney on February 28, 1782, in South Carolina. She was born September 15, 1763, in County Antrim, Ulster Province, Ireland & died 27 Aug 1841 in Greenville County, South Carolina. Her family was Loyalist and her brother, Alexander, returned to Ireland after the American Revolution, and whose son was Francis Rawdon Chesney.

Daniel was a Revolutionary War Patriot, prior to the Battle of Kings Mountain he was captured by the British and escaped. He was later "run through" by a British Officer's sword. Daniel McJunkin, brother of Major McJunkin, was with Col. Brandon at his defeat on Fair Forest. In the rout, he was overtaken by a British officer, who ran his thrust sword through his body. The blade entered between his shoulders, and came out in the breast, and came so far through that McJunkin caught it and held it tight in his agony. The officer said to him: "My good fellow, if you will let go, I will draw it out, and give you as little pain as possible. " He did so and the officer putting his foot against McJunkin's shoulder, as he sat on his horse, extracted the sword, upon which McJunkin fell to the ground. Mrs. C. Sims attended him for this wound, and under her skillful treatment, he recovered, and lived to a very old man, -if he is not yet dead. Wm. Sims, who went with his mother to see McJunkin, used to say he made the most awful groans while suffering from his wound, he ever heard mortal man utter. He moved to Pendleton.
