= Fisher River =

Fisher River may refer to:

In Australia:

- Fisher River (Tasmania), a river near the Fisher Power Station

In Canada:

- Fisher River Cree Nation
- Fisher River (Manitoba), a river that flows into Lake Winnipeg near Fisher Bay Provincial Park

In the United States:

- Fisher River (Montana)
- Fisher River (North Carolina)
- Fisher River (Wisconsin), a river that joins the Chippewa River in Brunet Island State Park

== See also ==
- Fish River (disambiguation)
- Fishing Creek (disambiguation)
