= Fish River =

Fish River may refer to:

== Watercourses ==
Africa

- Fish River (Namibia)

Australia

- Fish River (Northern Territory), a tributary of the Daly River, located in the Northern Territory
- Fish River (Oberon), a tributary of the Macquarie River, located near Oberon, New South Wales
- Fish River (Gunning), a river near Gunning, New South Wales

New Zealand

- Fish River (New Zealand), a tributary of the Makarora River in the Otago Region

United States

- Fish River (Alabama)
- Fish River (Alaska)
- Fish River (Maine)
- Fish River chain of lakes, in Maine

== Places ==
- Fish River railway station, a station on the Main Southern railway line, New South Wales, Australia, 1875–1975

== See also ==
- Great Fish River, in South Africa
- Back River (Nunavut), in Nunavut, Canada, also known as "Thlewechodyeth", or "Great Fish River"
- Fish River Canyon
- Fisher River (disambiguation)
- Fishing Creek (disambiguation)
