= Joseph McJunkin =

Major Joseph Caldwell McJunkin (1755 – 1846) was an American Revolutionary War patriot serving in the battle of Kings Mountain, North Carolina.

Joseph Caldwell McJunkin was the first son of Samuel Caldwell McJunkin and Mary Anne Bogan. Born 22 June 1755 in Carlisle, Cumberland County, Pennsylvania & died 31 May 1846 in Union County, South Carolina, he married Anne Jane Thomas 9 March 1779 in Union District, South Carolina. She was born 15 January 1757 in Cumberland County, Pennsylvania & died 17 March 1826 in Union County, South Carolina. He was brother of Daniel Mcjunkin.

== Revolutionary War Service ==
In 1776, McJunkin volunteered in Col. John Thompson's Fair Forest Militia Regiment, where he engaged in the Cherokee campaign. In May 1777, he was made captain and commanded at Fort Jamieson. He served a three-month guard tour in Charleston, South Carolina, from November 1779 to February 1780. After the fall of Charleston, and the Battle of Camden, the Tory and Whig Militias engaged in guerilla war leading up to Huck's Defeat, and the Battle of King's Mountain.

He said of Captain Christian Huck:

to punish the Presbyterian inhabitants of that place, which he did with a barbarous hand, by killing men, burning churches, & driving off the ministers of the gospel to seek shelter amongst strangers.

McJunkin was at the Battle of King's Mountain, Cedar Springs, Hanging Rock, Musgrove's Mill, Hammond's Store, Blackstock's Ford, and the Battle of Cowpens.

He was taken as a captive to Old Ninety-Six, where he was released on parole. He then aided Gen. Nathanael Greene at the Siege of Ninety-Six.

== After the war ==
McJunkin married Anne Jane Thomas, (daughter of Colonel John Thomas and Jane Black Thomas) settled in Union County. In about the year 1837, he wrote his memoirs. Anne Thomas McJunkin died on 17 March 1826. Major Joseph Caldwell McJunkin died intestate on 31 May 1846. They are both buried in the McJunkin Cemetery, which is located about 6 miles south from the town of Union.

== Works ==
- Reverend James Hodge Saye, Memoirs of Major Joseph McJunkin - Revolutionary Patriot, Richmond Watchman and Observer, 1847
