= USS Cowpens =

Two ships of the United States Navy have been named USS Cowpens, after the Battle of Cowpens, an American victory during the American Revolutionary War.

- USS Cowpens (CVL-25), was a light aircraft carrier active in World War II and decommissioned in 1946.
- USS Cowpens (CG-63), was a guided missile cruiser commissioned in 1991 and was decommissioned in August 2024.
