= Fishing Hawk Creek =

Stream in West Virginia, U.S.

Coordinates: 38°48′52″N 79°44′24″W

Fishing Hawk Creek is a stream in the U.S. state of West Virginia.

Fishing Hawk Creek was named after the fish hawk native to the area.

== See also ==
- List of rivers of West Virginia
