= Anne Dell =

Australian biochemist

Professor Anne Dell
- Born: 11 September 1950 (age 75); Perth, Western Australia
- Citizenship: Australian, British
- Education: University of Western Australia; University of Cambridge
- Awards: Tate and Lyle Medal, Royal Society of Chemistry (1986); Whistler Award, International Carbohydrate Organisation (2000); FRS (2002); Haworth Memorial Lectureship, Royal Society of Chemistry (2003); International Glycoconjugate Organization Award (2005); Fellow of the Academy of Medical Sciences (2008); Commander of the Order of the British Empire (2009)
- Scientific career
- Fields: Biochemistry
- Workplaces: Imperial College London
- Thesis: Peptide and protein sequencing by mass spectrometry (1975)
- Doctoral advisor: Howard R. Morris

Anne Dell CBE FRS FMedSci (born 11 September 1950) is an Australian biochemist specialising in the study of glycomics and the carbohydrate structures that modify proteins. Anne's work could be used to figure out how pathogens such as HIV are able to evade termination by the immune system which could be applied toward understanding how this occurs in fetuses. Her research has also led to the development of higher sensitivity mass spectroscopy techniques which have allowed for the better studying of the structure of carbohydrates. Anne also established GlycoTRIC at Imperial College London, a research centre that allows for glycobiology to be better understood in biomedical applications. She is currently Professor of Carbohydrate Biochemistry and Head of the Department of Life Sciences at Imperial College London. Dell's other contributions to the study of Glycobiology are the additions she has made to the textbook "Essentials of Glycobiology" Dell was appointed Commander of the Order of the British Empire (CBE) in the 2009 Birthday Honours.

== Early life ==
Anne Dell was the youngest of seven children and grew up on a farm in the Australian outback, where she was educated at home by her mother using Correspondence School lessons until the age of eleven. She earned a First Class Honors degree in Organic chemistry from the University of Western Australia, and came to the UK to carry out her PhD at the University of Cambridge, before joining Imperial College where she is currently employed. She also has a daughter, who was born in 1984.

== Education and research ==
After gaining a First Class Honors degree (equivalent to B.S) in Organic Chemistry from the University of Western Australia, Dell was awarded an 1851 Exhibition Scholarship to study for a PhD at the University of Cambridge. After she was awarded her PhD in 1975 her doctoral supervisor, Howard R. Morris, moved to Imperial College London as a lecturer in biochemistry and brought Dell with him. She would remain at Imperial for the rest of her career. Anne was elected to the Fellowship of the Royal Society in 2002 and was appointed a CBE in recognition of her services to science in 2009. Other honours include election to Fellowship of the Academy of Medical Sciences and Membership of the European Academy of Science. She has Honorary Doctorates from the University of Western Australia and the University of Waterloo in Canada. In 2017 Dell and her colleagues determined in their experiment that O-linked glycosylation is not necessary for the natural replication cycle of HIV. They also determined that the diversity of the many GalNAc transferase enzymes that initiate O-linked carbohydrate attachment and the theoretical possibility that natural target cells for HIV in vivo could potentially complete such O-linked carbohydrate attachment to increase infectivity further. Dell's other contributions to the study of Glycobiology are the additions she has made to chapter 50 of the textbook "Essentials of Glycobiology" this chapter gave methods for the characterisation of glycan structure, including residue composition, linkage types, and attachment to aglycones. It covered methods for detection of specific glycan sequences on glycoproteins and it covers methods for characterising structures in three dimensions. The methods varied widely and included nuclear magnetic resonance (NMR) spectroscopy and mass spectrometry (MS) techniques that allow more detailed structures to be observed in the study of Glycobiology.

=== Honors and awards ===
- Tate and Lyle Medal, Royal Society of Chemistry (1986)
- Whistler Award, International Carbohydrate Organisation (2000)
- FRS (2002)
- Haworth Memorial Lectureship, Royal Society of Chemistry (2003)
- International Glycoconjugate Organisation Award (2005)
- Fellow of the Academy of Medical Sciences (2008)
- Commander of the Order of the British Empire (2009)

== Bibliography ==
- Haslam SM, North SJ, Dell A (October 2006). "Mass spectrometric analysis of N- and O-glycosylation of tissues and cells". Curr. Opin. Struct. Biol. 16 (5): 584–91. doi:10.1016/j.sbi.2006.08.006. PMID 16938453.
- Hitchen PG, Dell A (June 2006). "Bacterial glycoproteomics". Microbiology. 152 (Pt 6): 1575–80. doi:10.1099/mic.0.28859-0. PMID 16735721.
- Dell A, Morris HR (March 2001). "Glycoprotein structure determination by mass spectrometry". Science. 291 (5512): 2351–6. Bibcode:2001Sci...291.2351D. doi:10.1126/science.1058890. PMID 11269315. S2CID 23936441.
- Dell A, Reason AJ (February 1993). "Carbohydrate analysis". Curr. Opin. Biotechnol. 4 (1): 52–6. doi:10.1016/0958-1669(93)90032-R. PMID 7763394.
