= Spartan Regiment =

American Revolutionary War militia group

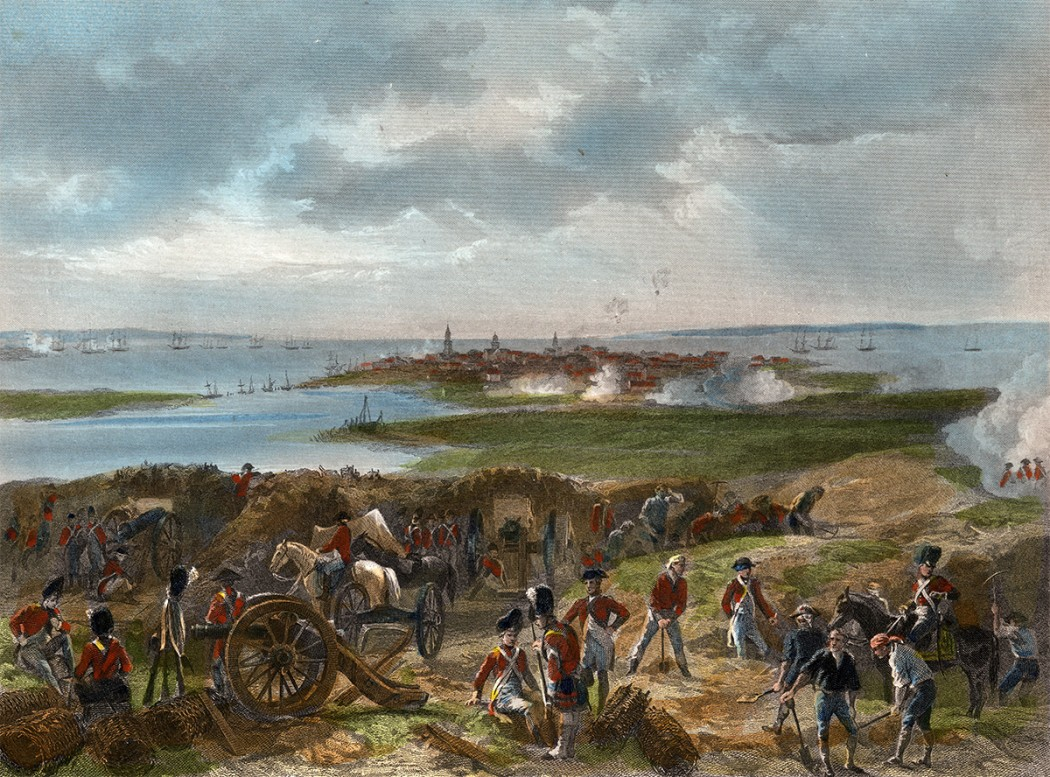
Siege of Charleston (also Fall of Charleston)

The Spartan Regiment, a militia group of South Carolina in the American Revolution, was formed in 1775 by John Thomas at the request of the Council of Safety. The regiment was formed on August 2, 1775 at Wofford's Iron Mill. Thomas held the first muster at his house. The Spartan Regiment met every two weeks to train for battle. Thomas found himself fighting against his former militia leader, Col. Thomas Fletchall, who was a loyalist or Tory. The patriots were also called Whigs.

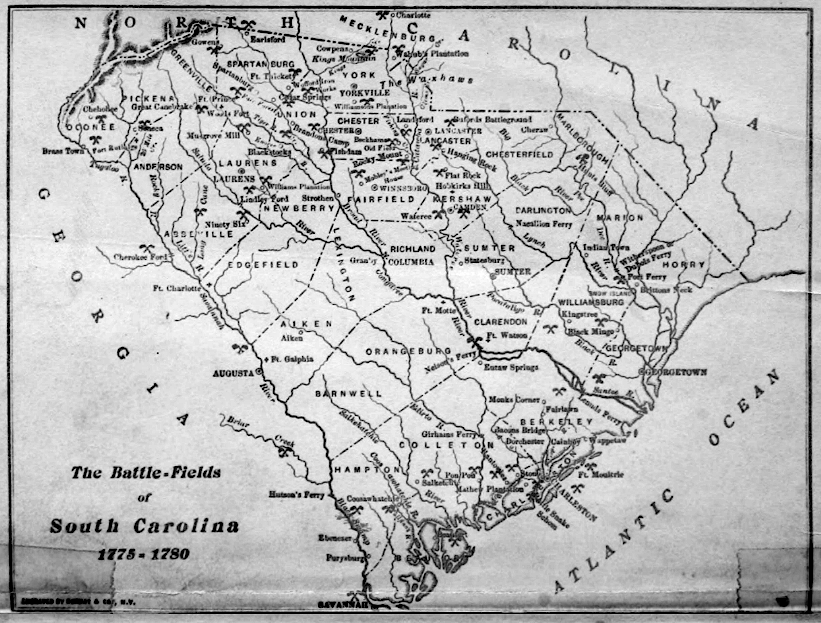
Map of South Carolina Battlefields 1775 - 1780 County Borders are not historical, but seem to predate the publication date a bit (pre 1896).

The regiment served at the Snow Campaign in November and December 1775. Parris's Mill in Greenville District a site for fighting during the campaign. In 1778 the regiment was split into the 1st and 2nd Spartan Regiments.

Spartanburg County, South Carolina, formed in 1785, was named after this regiment.

== Participated ==
- Battle of Cowpens, serving under a brigade of four battalions under Colonel Andrew Pickens
- Battle of Musgrove Mill, Spartan Regiment served under South Carolina militia under command of Col. James Williams and Major Samuel Hammond
- Battle of Ramsour's Mill, led by Col. Thomas Brandon
- Siege of Charleston, served under the 2nd brigade of South Carolina militia
- Siege of Savage's Old Fields, led by Capt. John Lisle, Jr.

== See also ==
- List of South Carolina militia units in the American Revolution
- South Carolina militia

== Sources ==
- Ingle, Sheila (2022). "South Carolina Biography: Revolutionary Women: Jane Black Thomas" (PDF). South Carolina American Revolution Sestercentennial Commission. Archived from the original (PDF) on 2024-07-17.
