= Fishing Creek (Missouri) =

Stream in the American state of Missouri

Coordinates: 38.3958533°N 93.9107725°W

Fishing Creek (also called Fishing Hollow Branch) is a stream in Henry County in the U.S. state of Missouri. It is a tributary of the South Grand River.

Fishing Creek was named for the fishing activity along its course.

== See also ==
- List of rivers of Missouri
