= James Williams (Revolutionary War) =

American pioneer, farmer, and miller

- Born: November 10, 1740; Old Church, Hanover County, Virginia Colony
- Died: October 7, 1780 (aged 39); Cherokee County, South Carolina, USA
- Burial place: Gaffney, South Carolina
- Military career
- Allegiance: United States
- Branch: South Carolina militia
- Service years: 1773–1780
- Rank: Colonel
- Conflicts: American Revolutionary War; Siege of Savage's Old Fields; Battle of Stono Ferry; Battle of Brier Creek; Battle of Musgrove Mill; Battle of Kings Mountain †

James Henderson Williams (November 10, 1740 – October 7, 1780) was an American pioneer, farmer, and miller from Ninety-Six District in South Carolina. In 1775 and 1776, Williams was a member of the state's Provisional Assembly. During the War of Independence, he held a colonel's rank in the South Carolina militia. He was killed at the decisive Battle of Kings Mountain.

== Early life ==
Williams was born in Hanover County, Virginia and was the son of Daniel Williams and Ursula Clark Henderson. His siblings included James, Joseph, John, Daniel, Henry, Mariah Goodman, and Mary Mitchell. He was orphaned the week after his 17th birthday. He moved into the home of his brother, John, in Granville County, North Carolina. John, being a lawyer, gave him a basic education before James set out on his own. He settled on the Little River in South Carolina.

By 1773, Williams had started a farm and built a mill in Ninety-Six District on the South Carolina western frontier (in what is modern Laurens County, South Carolina), and was an officer in the local militia. Tensions rose before the revolution, as many of his neighbors took a Loyalist stance. Williams supported the Patriot cause. He joined the local Committee of Safety, and was elected to the state's Provincial Congress in 1775 and again in 1776.

== War of Independence ==
In 1776, the Ninety-Six District militia split into Loyalist and Patriot factions. Williams was made a lieutenant colonel of a regiment, but he had to recruit and train the new men. He succeeded in organizing a militia group, but pressure from Britain and her Indian allies meant that Williams always had to leave some troops behind for home defense. Williams led forces of local men into action at nearby Briar Creek and Stono Ferry, and as far afield as the expedition to the Second Battle of Savannah.

On August 19, 1780, he led his detachment into the Battle of Musgrove Mill. The Patriots' success there, even in such a limited engagement and coming so soon after the disaster of Camden, earned him a promotion to colonel.

=== Battle of Kings Mountain ===
Williams led a 100-man detachment to meet up with other militia from the overmountain settlements which were gathering to engage Cornwallis' western force led by Major Patrick Ferguson. He joined with the other units at Cowpens on October 6. The next day these forces won a major victory at the Battle of Kings Mountain, where the out-numbered Americans overwhelmed a 1,100 man Loyalist force, while suffering only twenty-eight fatalities. Williams was one of them.

== Burial on John B. Mintz property ==
Williams' original hastily dug grave was on John B. Mintz's property, on top of a hill at the intersection of Buffalo Creek and the Broad River, near Blacksburg, South Carolina. His body was dug up in May 1898 and kept secret for several years before being re-interred on the lawn in front of the Administration building, on Limestone Street in Gaffney, South Carolina and marked by a large memorial. The following newspaper article relates the story of his body being dug up. "Several days ago a party of men consisting of A. G. Mintz, Rev. Mr. Bailey, J. E. Mintz, J. H. Mintz, Lee Broom, F. L. White and several others opened the grave of Colonel Williams, who was seriously wounded at the battle of King's Mountain and was carried by the Americans on their retreat eastward, back across Broad River. That night he died and was buried on a hill near the intersection of Buffalo Creek and Broad River. His bones were found in a good state of preservation and were all removed except the skull, which are hidden away for a future funeral. Mr. A. G. Mintz was exhibiting the skull on the streets of Blacksburg. It is proposed that his remains be buried in Berkley Park at Blacksburg and a monument be erected over them. - Yorkville Yeoman. Story published in The Laurens Advertiser (Laurens, South Carolina), Tuesday, 17 May 1898, page 3.

His death was unknown for several weeks and during that time the South Carolina Provincial Congress had promoted Col. James Williams to the rank of brigadier general; the commission could not be delivered. In 2005, the South Carolina General Assembly confirmed the rank originally bestowed upon him 225 years before. In the same act, Gen. Williams was further honored by renaming the Little River Bridge, "James Williams Memorial Bridge", marking the northeast corner of what had been his plantation.

== See also ==
Gideon Gibson Jr.
