= White Stone, South Carolina =

- Unincorporated community
- Location within South Carolina Location within the United States
- Coordinates: 34°54′10″N 81°49′01″W
- Country: United States
- State: South Carolina
- County: Spartanburg
- Elevation: 801 ft (244 m)
- Time zone: UTC-5 (Eastern (EST))
  - Summer (DST): UTC-4 (EDT)
- ZIP code: 29386
- Area codes: 864, 821
- GNIS feature ID: 1251423

White Stone is an unincorporated community in Spartanburg County, South Carolina, United States. The community is located along South Carolina Highway 295, 7.3 miles (11.7 km) east-southeast of Spartanburg. White Stone has a post office with ZIP code 29386, which opened on February 2, 1827.
