= Battle of Musgrove Mill =

1780 battle of the American Revolutionary War

- Part of the American Revolutionary War
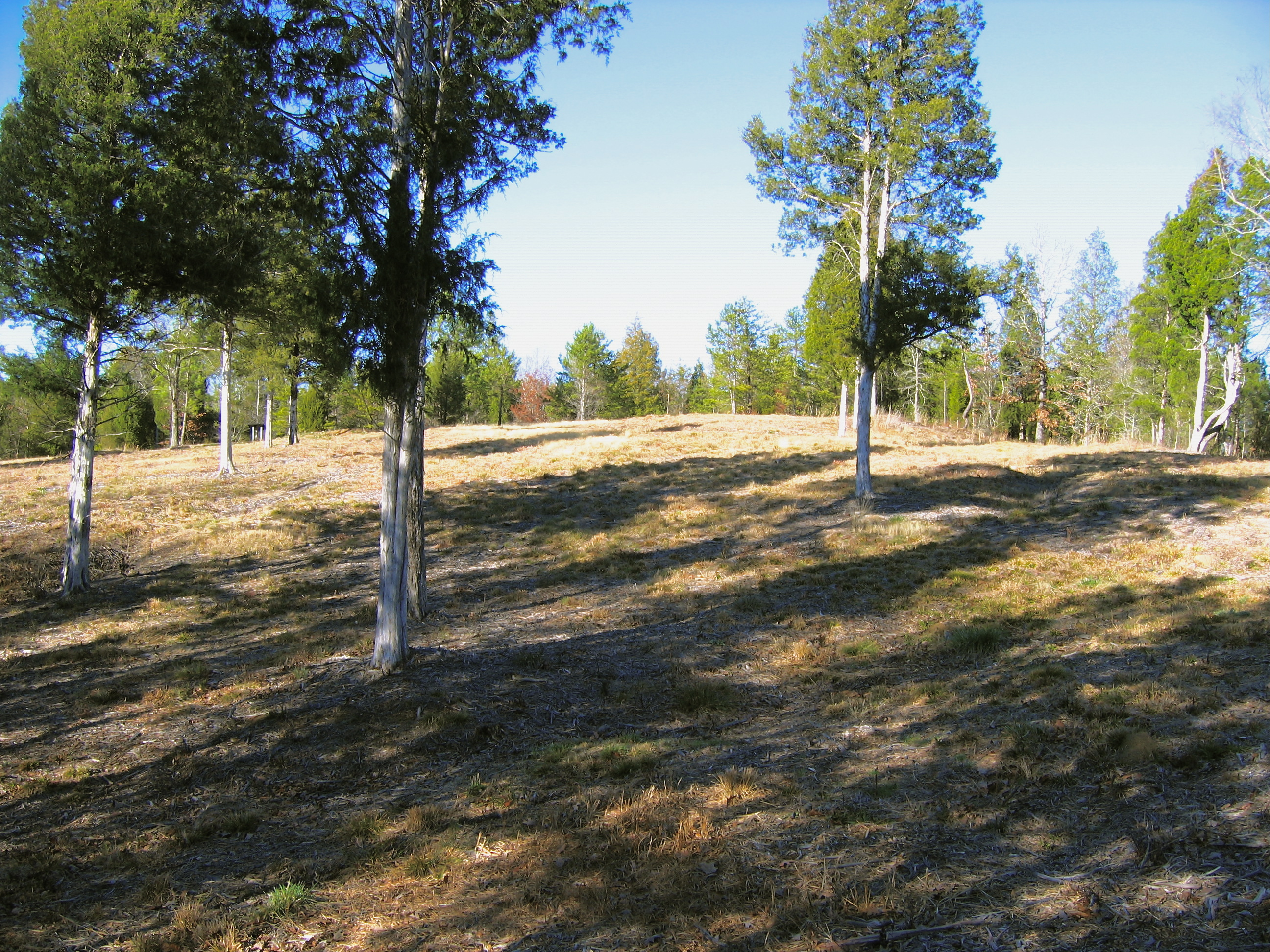
- View towards the ridge line where Patriot militia defeated attacking Loyalist regulars and militia.
Date	August 18, 1780
Location	Laurens County, near Cross Anchor, South Carolina 34°35′36.76″N 81°51′8.92″W
Result	Patriot victory

Belligerents
(Kingdom of Great Britain) Loyalist militia	(United States) Patriot militia

Commanders and leaders
(Kingdom of Great Britain) Alexander Innes (Kingdom of Great Britain) Abraham de Peyster (Kingdom of Great Britain) Daniel Clary	(United States) Isaac Shelby (United States) James Williams (United States) Elijah Clarke

Strength
500	200

Casualties and losses
63 killed Unknown number wounded 70 captured	4 killed 12 wounded

The Battle of Musgrove Mill, August 19, 1780, occurred near a ford of the Enoree River, near the present-day border between Spartanburg, Laurens and Union Counties in South Carolina during the American Revolutionary War. During the course of the battle, 200 Patriot militiamen defeated a combined force of approximately 300 Loyalist militiamen and 200 provincial regulars.

== Background ==
By the summer of 1780, the war that raged in the backcountry of South Carolina had effectively become America’s first civil war. Few men engaged on either side had ever seen Great Britain, and backcountry fighting tended to be especially brutal and retaliatory.

== Battle ==
On the evening of August 18, two hundred mounted Patriot partisans under joint command of Colonels Isaac Shelby, James Williams, and Elijah Clarke prepared to raid a Loyalist camp at Musgrove’s Mill, which controlled the local grain supply and guarded a ford of the Enoree River. The Patriots anticipated surprising a garrison of about an equal number of Loyalists, but a local farmer informed them that the Tories had recently been reinforced by about a hundred Loyalist militia and two hundred provincial regulars on their way to join British Major Patrick Ferguson.

With their position compromised by an enemy patrol and horses unable to go on without rest, the Patriots understood that they must stand and fight despite being outnumbered better than two to one. At the top of a ridge across the road leading down to Musgrove Mill, the partisans quickly formed a semicircular breastwork of brush and fallen timber about three hundred yards long.

In the best tradition of guerrilla tactics, a band of about twenty men under the leadership of Captain Shadrach Inman crossed the Enoree and engaged the enemy. Feigning confusion they retreated back toward the line of ambush until the Loyalists were nearly on the Patriot line. When the Loyalists spotted the Patriot line, they fired too early. The Patriots, however, held their fire until the Loyalists got within killing range of their muskets.

Patriot musket fire operated “with devastating effect.” Nonetheless, the Tory regulars were well disciplined and nearly overwhelmed the Patriot right flank with a bayonet charge. (Frontiersmen had no bayonets.) Isaac Shelby ordered his reserve of “Overmountain Men” to support him, and they rushed into the battle shrieking Indian war cries. The Tories wavered, and when a number of their officers went down, they broke—although not before Captain Inman, who had a key role in implementing the Patriot strategy, was killed on the battlefield.

Patriots ran from their positions “yelling, shooting, and slashing on every hand.” The whole battle took perhaps an hour. Within that period, sixty-three Tories were killed, an unknown number wounded, and seventy were taken prisoner. The Patriots lost only about four dead and twelve wounded.

=== Known participants ===
Patriots, 200 to 300 men:

North Carolina and Georgia militia under command of Colonel Isaac Shelby:

- Sullivan County Regiment of North Carolina militia
- Burke County Regiment of North Carolina militia
- Washington County Regiment of North Carolina militia
- Wilkes County regiment of Georgia militia

South Carolina militia under command of Col. James Williams and Major Samuel Hammond

- 1st Spartan Regiment
- 2nd Spartan Regiment
- Roebuck's Battalion of Spartan
- Lower District regiment
- Little River District regiment

Loyalists under the command of Lt. Col. Alexander Innis

- South Carolina Royalists, a regiment of provincial loyalists trained and equipped as British Regulars
- New Jersey Volunteers
- DeLancey's Brigade, 1st Battalion
- Fanning's South Carolina Loyalist militia
- Dutch Fork Regiment of Loyalist militia

== Aftermath ==
Some Whig leaders briefly considered attacking the Tory stronghold at Ninety Six, South Carolina; but they hurriedly dispersed after learning that a large Patriot army had been defeated at Camden three days previous.

Shelby’s forces covered sixty miles with Ferguson in hot pursuit before making good their escape. In the wake of General Horatio Gates’ blundering defeat at Camden, the victory at Musgrove Mill heartened the Patriots and served as further evidence that the South Carolina backcountry could not be held by the Tories.

Shelby and his Overmountain Men fled back over the Appalachian Mountains and into the territory of the Watauga Association at Sycamore Shoals in present-day Elizabethton, Tennessee, and by the next month on September 25, 1780, Colonels Shelby, John Sevier, and Charles McDowell and their 600 Overmountain Men had combined forces with Col. William Campbell and his 400 Virginia men at the Sycamore Shoals muster in advance of the October 7, 1780 Battle of Kings Mountain near present-day Blacksburg, South Carolina.

The Musgrove Mill battlefield is preserved at the Musgrove Mill State Historic Site, and it is listed on the National Register of Historic Places.
