= Battle of Cowpens =

1781 battle of the American Revolutionary War

Coordinates: 35°08′12.6″N 81°48′57.6″W

- Part of the American Revolutionary War
- 2004 painting of the battle
Date	January 17, 1781
Location	Near Cowpens, South Carolina
Result	American victory

Belligerents
United States	Great Britain

Commanders and leaders
Daniel Morgan	Banastre Tarleton

Strength
1,887–1,912	1,150; 2 guns

Casualties and losses
25 killed 124 wounded	110 killed 229 wounded 629 captured or missing 2 guns captured

The Battle of Cowpens was a military engagement of the American Revolutionary War fought on January 17, 1781, near the town of Cowpens, South Carolina. An American army of nearly 2,000 regulars and militia under Brigadier general Daniel Morgan defeated a force of about 1,000 British and Loyalist troops commanded by Lieutenant-colonel Banastre Tarleton. It was the worst defeat suffered by the British in North America during the conflict following the 1777 Saratoga campaign.

The battle was part of the British "Southern strategy" in which British forces attempted to retake control over the American South under the belief that there was a significant Loyalist population there. However, such assumptions were mostly unfounded, and pro-Patriot sentiment surged in the South following the spread of news of the American victory at Cowpens. Tactically, the battle demonstrated that militia, when deployed properly, could defeat experienced regulars, something which American military and political leaders had previously considered impossible.

Morgan's militiamen disbanded after the battle, leaving 550 regulars under his command. British General Lord Cornwallis pursued Morgan during December 1780 and January 1781 with an army of 2,500 men. Morgan evaded Cornwallis and joined American General Nathanael Greene’s army near Greensboro, North Carolina, in early February, resulting in the Battle of Guilford Court House.

== Background ==
On October 14, 1780, Continental Army commander General George Washington chose Nathanael Greene, a Rhode Island Quaker officer, to be commander of the Southern Department of the Continental forces. Greene's task was not an easy one. In 1780 the Carolinas had been the scene of a long string of disasters for the Continental Army, the worst being the capture of one American army under General Benjamin Lincoln in May 1780 at the siege of Charleston. The British then occupied the city, the largest in the South and the capital of South Carolina. Later that year, an American army commanded by General Horatio Gates was defeated at the Battle of Camden. A victory of Patriot militiamen over their Loyalist counterparts at the Battle of Kings Mountain on the northwest frontier in October had bought time, but the British still occupied most of South Carolina. When Greene took command, the southern army numbered 2,307 men on paper (1,482 present), of whom 949 were Continental regulars, mostly of the famous and highly trained "Maryland Line" regiment.

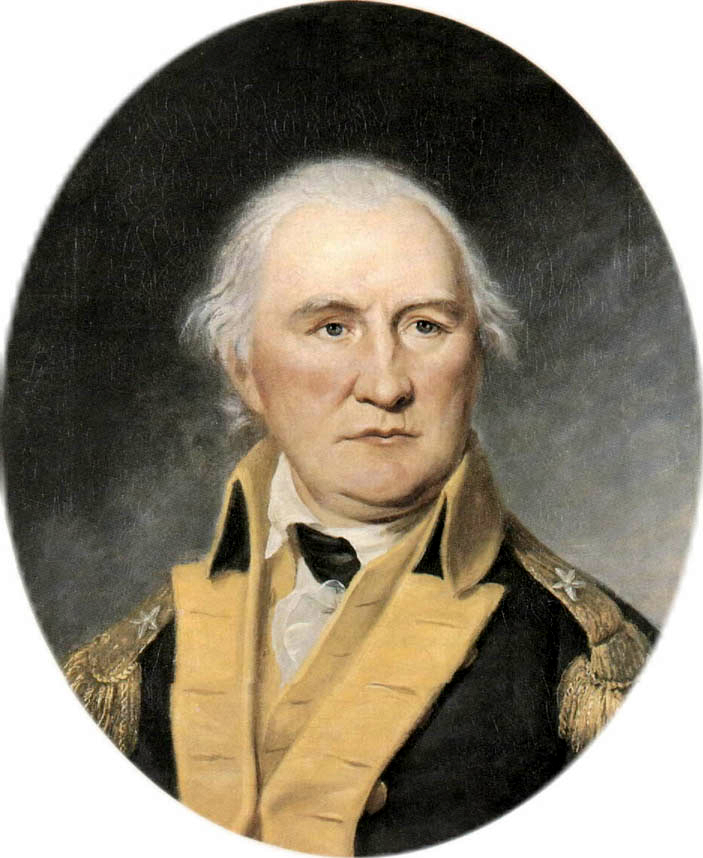
Brigadier General Daniel Morgan

On December 3, Brigadier General Daniel Morgan reported for duty to Greene's headquarters at Charlotte, North Carolina. At the start of the American Revolution, Morgan—whose military experience dated to the French and Indian War (1754–1763)—had served at the siege of Boston in 1775. Later he participated in the 1775 invasion of Canada and its climactic battle, the Battle of Quebec. That battle ended in defeat and Morgan's capture by the British. Morgan was exchanged in January 1777 and placed by Washington in command of a picked force of 500 trained riflemen, known as Morgan's Riflemen. Morgan and his men played a key role in the 1777 victory at Saratoga, which proved to be a turning point of the entire war. Bitter after being passed over for promotion and plagued by severe attacks of sciatica, Morgan left the army in 1779. A year later, he was promoted to brigadier general and returned to service in the Southern Department.

Greene decided that his weak army could not meet the British in a stand-up fight. He made the unconventional decision to divide his army, sending a detachment west of the Catawba River to raise the morale of the locals and find supplies beyond the limited amounts available around Charlotte. Greene gave Morgan command of this wing and instructed him to join with the militia west of the Catawba and take command of them. Morgan headed west on December 21, charged with taking position between the Broad and Pacolet rivers and protecting the civilians in that area. He had 600 men, some 400 of whom were Continentals, mostly from Delaware and Maryland. The rest were Virginia militia who had experience as Continentals. By Christmas Day, Morgan had reached the Pacolet. He was joined by 60 more South Carolina militiamen led by the experienced guerrilla partisan Andrew Pickens. Other militia from Georgia and the Carolinas joined Morgan's camp.

Meanwhile, Lord Cornwallis was planning to return to North Carolina and conduct the invasion that he had postponed after the defeat at Kings Mountain. Morgan's force represented a threat to his left. Additionally, Cornwallis received incorrect intelligence claiming that Morgan was going to attack the important British fort of American Loyalists at Ninety Six, South Carolina. Seeking to save the fort and defeat Morgan's command, Cornwallis on January 1, 1781, with a follow-up message on January 2 ordered cavalry (dragoons) commanded by Lieutenant Colonel Banastre Tarleton to the west.

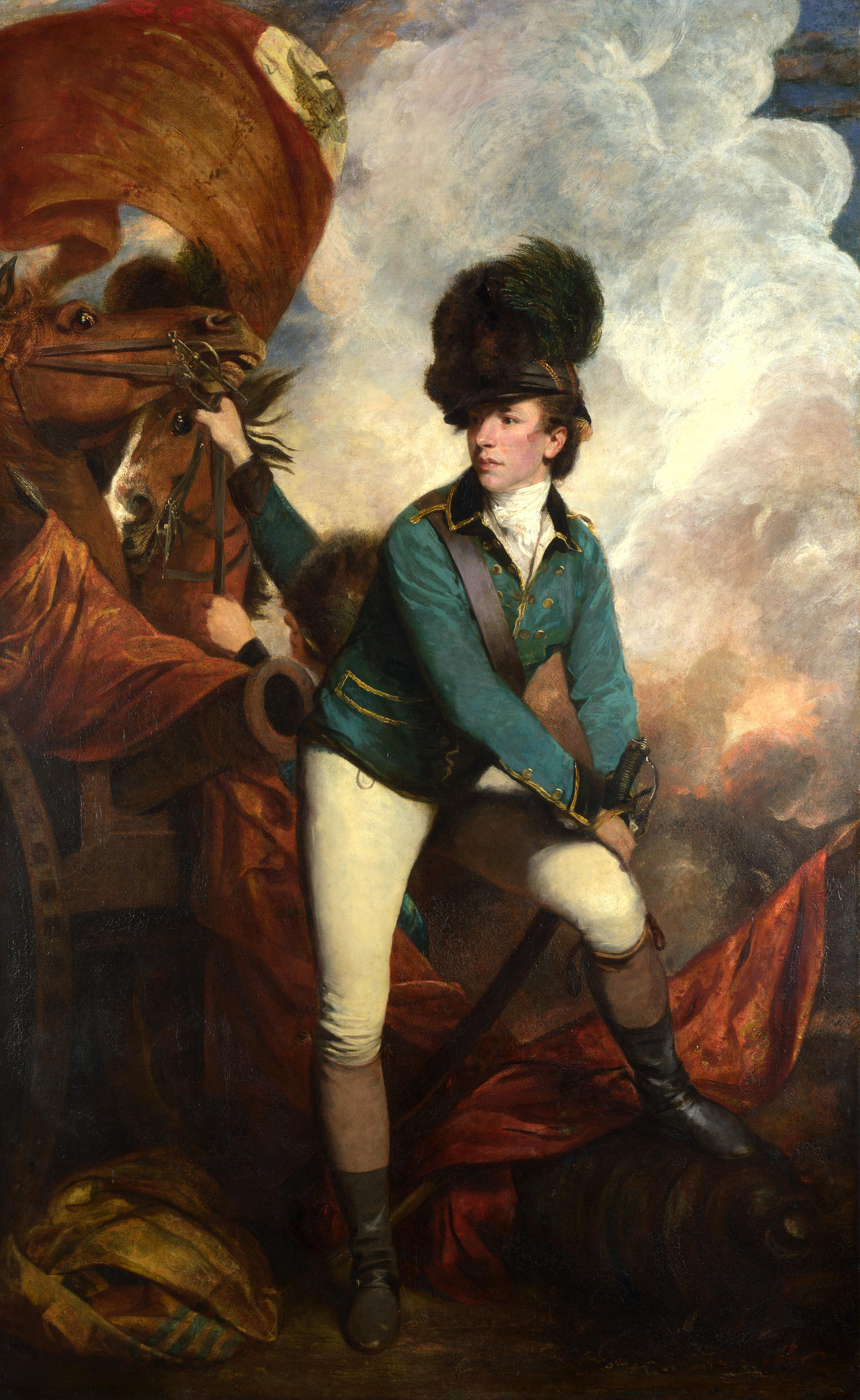
Portrait of Banastre Tarleton by Sir Joshua Reynolds

Tarleton had enjoyed a spectacular career in his service with the British in the colonies. In December 1776, he and a small party surprised and captured American General Charles Lee in New Jersey. He served with distinction at the siege of Charleston and the Battle of Camden. Commanding the British Legion—a mixed infantry/cavalry force composed of American Loyalists who constituted some of the best British troops in the Carolinas—Tarleton won victories at Monck's Corner and Fishing Creek. He became infamous among colonists after his victory at the Battle of Waxhaws, where his men were accused of killing American soldiers after they had surrendered. Fleeing Patriots believed at least one soldier who had surrendered picked up a gun and shot at Tarleton. Tarleton wrote in his 1781 history that his horse had been shot from under him during the initial charge and his men, thinking him murdered, attacked relentlessly until brought under control.

Tarleton and the Legion marched to Ninety Six. After learning Morgan was not there, Tarleton asked for reinforcements of British regulars, which Cornwallis sent. Tarleton set out with his enlarged command to drive Morgan across the Broad River. On January 12 he received accurate news of Morgan's location and continued with hard marching, building boats to cross rivers that were flooding with winter rains. Receiving word that Tarleton was in hot pursuit, Morgan retreated north to avoid being trapped between Tarleton and Cornwallis.

By the afternoon of January 16, Morgan was approaching the Broad River, which was high with flood waters and reported difficult to cross. He knew Tarleton was close behind. By nightfall, he had reached a place called locally "Hannah's Cowpens," a well-known grazing area for local cattle. Pickens, who had been patrolling, arrived that night to join Morgan with his large body of irregular militia. Morgan decided to stand and fight rather than continue to retreat and risk being caught by Tarleton while fording the Broad. Learning of Morgan's location, Tarleton pushed his troops, marching at 3 a.m. instead of camping for the night.

== Prelude ==
=== Continental force ===
The size of the American force at Cowpens remains in dispute. Morgan claims in his official report to have had about 800 men at Cowpens, which is substantially supported by historian John Buchanan whose estimate is between 800 and 1,000 men. In contrast, historian Lawrence E. Babits in his detailed study of the battle offers an interesting alternative estimate contending that the strength of Morgan's command on the day of the battle was closer to 1,900, composed of:

- A battalion of Continental infantry under Lieutenant Colonel John Eager Howard of Baltimore, with one company from Delaware ("Delaware Line"), one from Virginia, and three from the famous stalwart "Maryland Line" regiment, each with a strength of 60 men (300)
- A company of Virginia state militia troops under Captain John Lawson (75)
- A company of South Carolina state troops under Captain Joseph Pickens (60)
- A small company of North Carolina state troops under Captain Henry Connelly (number not given)
- A Virginia militia battalion under Frank Triplett (160)
- Three companies of Virginia militia under Major David Campbell (50)
- A battalion of North Carolina militia under Colonel Joseph McDowell (260–285)
- A brigade of four battalions of South Carolina militia under Colonel Andrew Pickens, comprising a three-company battalion of the Spartan Regiment under Lieutenant Colonel Benjamin Roebuck, a four-company battalion of the Spartan Regiment under Colonel John Thomas, five companies of the Little River Regiment under Lieutenant Colonel Joseph Hayes, and seven companies of the Fair Forest Regiment under Colonel Thomas Brandon. Babits states that this battalion "ranged in size from 120 to more than 250 men." If Roebuck's three companies numbered 120 and Brandon's seven companies numbered 250, then Thomas's four companies probably numbered about 160 and Hayes's five companies about 200 for a total of 730.
- Three small companies of Georgia militia commanded by Major Cunningham who numbered 55
- A detachment of the 1st and 3rd Continental Light Dragoons under Lieutenant Colonel William Washington (82), who was a second cousin of George Washington.
- Detachments of state dragoons from North Carolina and Virginia (30)
- A detachment of South Carolina state dragoons, with a few mounted Georgians, commanded by Major James McCall (25)
- A company of newly raised volunteers from the local South Carolina militia commanded by Major Benjamin Jolly (45)

Babits's figures can be summarized as follows: 82 Continental light dragoons, 55 state dragoons, 45 militia dragoons, 300 Continental infantry, about 150 state infantry, and 1,255–1,280 militia infantry for a total of 1,887–1,912 officers and men. Broken down by state, there were about 855 South Carolinians, 442 Virginians, 290–315 North Carolinians, 180 Marylanders, 60 Georgians, and 60 Delawareans.

Morgan's forces were strengthened by these seasoned troops. His Continentals were veterans (Marylanders from the 1776 Battle of Brooklyn), as were many of his militia which included some Overmountain Men who had fought at the Battle of Musgrove Mill and the Battle of Kings Mountain. British officers had a low opinion of militia. "Tarleton, who had some idea as to the composition of [Morgan’s] forces, was eager to take them on."

=== British force ===
Tarleton's force included:

- 250 dragoons and 200 light infantrymen of the British Legion,
- A 50-man troop of the 17th Light Dragoons,
- A Royal Artillery battery comprising 24 men and two 3-pounder cannons,
- 177 men of the 7th Regiment of Foot,
- A light company of the 16th Regiment of Foot comprising 42 men,
- 334 men of the 71st Regiment of Foot, Fraser's Highlanders under Major Arthur MacArthur,
- A light company of the Prince of Wales' American Regiment comprising 31 men,
- 50 Loyalist guides,

In total the British force consisted of over 1,150 officers and other ranks.

Broken down by troop classification, Tarleton had 300 cavalrymen, 553 British regulars, 231 Loyalist regulars, 24 artillerymen, and 50 irregulars. Nearly half of his men, 481 out of 1,158, were Loyalists. Tarleton's British regulars from the 17th Light Dragoons, 7th, 16th, and 71st Regiments of Foot and Royal Artillery were reliable and seasoned soldiers. Tarleton's own unit, the Loyalist British Legion, had established a fierce reputation as formidable pursuers, being used to great effect at Waxhaws and Camden, but they had an uncertain reputation when facing determined opposition.

=== Morgan's plan ===
Reenactors portraying American troops march into battle at Cowpens

Morgan turned to his advantage the terrain of Cowpens, the varying reliability of his troops, his expectations of his opponent, and the time available before Tarleton's arrival. He knew that untrained militiamen, which comprised a large portion of his force, were generally unreliable in a pitched battle. In the past, they had routed at the first hint of defeat and abandoned the regulars. For instance, the Battle of Camden had ended in disaster when the militia, which comprised half of the American force, broke and ran as soon as the fighting started, leaving the American flank exposed. To eliminate that possibility, he defied convention by placing his army between the Broad and Pacolet rivers, thus making escape impossible if the army was routed. Selecting a low hill as the center of his position, he placed his Continental infantry on it, deliberately leaving his flanks exposed to his opponent. With a ravine on their right flank and a creek on their left flank, Morgan reasoned his forces were sufficiently protected against possible British flanking maneuvers at the beginning of the battle.

Morgan surmised that Tarleton would be highly confident and attack him head-on, without pausing to devise a more subtle plan. He therefore arranged his forces to encourage this presupposed impetuosity of his opponent by establishing three lines of soldiers: one of sharpshooters, one of militia, and a main line of regulars and experienced militia. The first line was composed of 150 select riflemen from North Carolina (under McDowell) and Georgia (under Cunningham). The second line consisted of 300 militiamen under the command of Pickens. The effect was the conspicuous placement of weak militia in the center-front in order to encourage Tarleton to attack there. The skirmishers and militia would screen the veteran Continental regulars while inflicting casualties as the British advanced. Morgan asked the militia to fire two volleys, something they could do, and then withdraw to the left and re-form in the rear behind the third line, under the cover of reserve light dragoons commanded by Washington and McCall. The withdrawal of the militia was in effect a feigned retreat which would further embolden Tarleton. The third line, on the hill, was manned by Morgan's most seasoned troops: around 550 Continental regulars including the Maryland Line and Delaware Line, supported by experienced militiamen from Georgia and Virginia. Howard commanded the Continental regulars, while Tate and Triplett commanded the experienced militia. The third line could be expected to stand and hold against the British force. Morgan expected that the British advance uphill would be disorganized, weakened both physically and psychologically by the first two lines, before engaging the third. The third line would also withdraw a short distance to add to the appearance of a rout.

Morgan, in arranging his battle lines at Cowpens, proposed "to turn a weakness into a strength" by feigning a retreat of his militia. "His plan is studied to this day." In developing his tactics at Cowpens, as historian John Buchanan wrote, Morgan may have been "the only general in the American Revolution, on either side, to produce a significant original tactical thought".

=== Tarleton's approach ===
Reenactors at Cowpens

At 2:00 a.m. on January 17 Tarleton roused his troops and continued his march to Cowpens. Babits states "in the five days before Cowpens, the British were subjected to stress that could only be alleviated by rest and proper diet. ...In the forty-eight hours before the battle, the British ran out of food and had less than four hours' sleep". Over the whole period, Tarleton's brigade did a great deal of rapid marching across difficult terrain. Babits concludes that they reached the battlefield exhausted and malnourished. Tarleton sensed victory, and nothing would persuade him to delay. His Loyalist scouts had told him of the countryside Morgan was fighting on, and he was certain of success because Morgan's soldiers, mostly militiamen, seemed to be caught between mostly experienced British troops and a flooding river. As soon as he reached the spot, Tarleton formed a battle line, which consisted of dragoons on his flanks, with his two grasshopper cannons in between the British Regulars and American Loyalists.

Tarleton's plan was simple and direct. Most of his infantry (including that of the Legion) would be assembled in linear formation and move directly upon Morgan. The right and left flanks of this line would be protected by dragoon units. In reserve was the 250-man battalion of 71st Highlanders commanded by MacArthur, a professional soldier of long experience who had served in the Dutch Scotch Brigade. Tarleton kept his 200-man cavalry contingent of his Legion ready to be unleashed when the Americans broke and ran.

== Battle ==
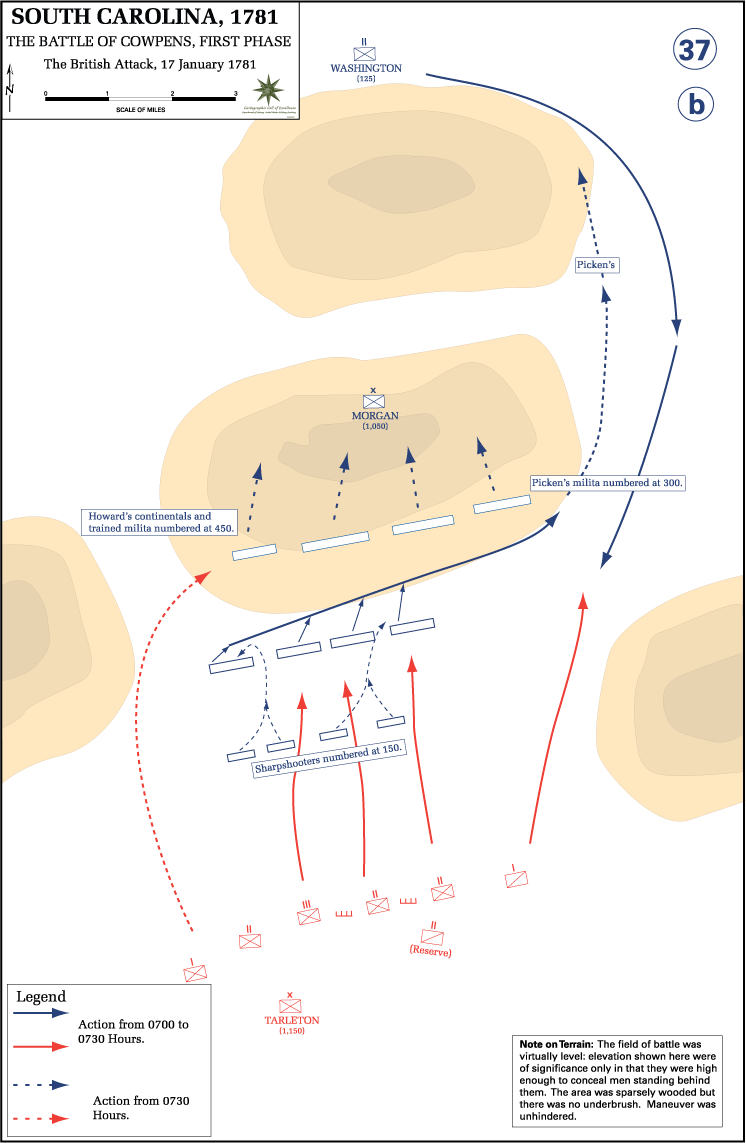
British attack, first phase

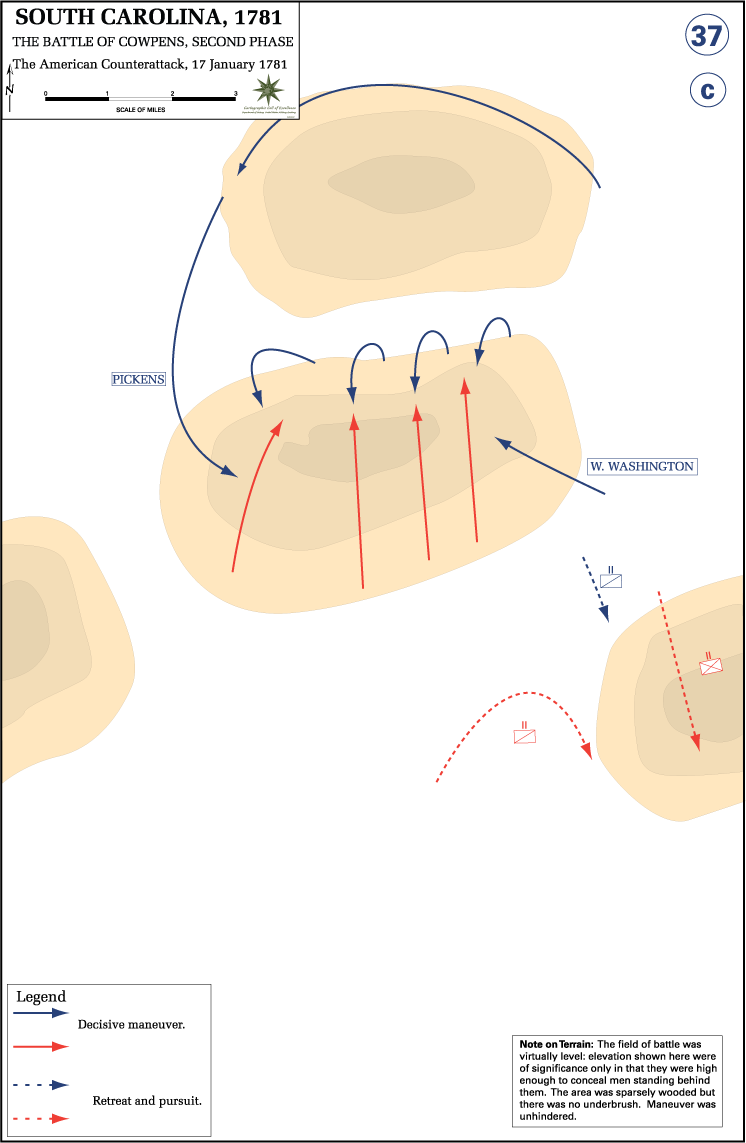
American counterattack, second phase

=== British attack ===
A few minutes before sunrise, Tarleton's vanguard emerged from the woods in front of the American position. Tarleton ordered his dragoons to attack the first line of skirmishers who then opened fire and shot 15 dragoons. When the dragoons promptly retreated, he immediately ordered an infantry charge without pausing to study the American deployment or to allow the rest of his infantry and his cavalry reserve to make it out of the woods. Tarleton attacked the skirmish line without pausing, deploying his main body and his two grasshopper cannons. The American skirmishers kept firing as they withdrew to join the second line manned by Pickens's irregular militia. The British attacked again, this time reaching the militiamen who (as ordered) poured two volleys into them, especially targeting commanders. Tarleton's troops were briefly thrown into disarray with 40% of their casualties being officers. However, they reorganized and continued to advance. Tarleton ordered one of his officers, Ogilvie, to charge with some dragoons into the "defeated" Americans. His men moved forward in regular formation and were momentarily paused by the militia musket fire, but continued to advance. Pickens's militia seemed to "flee" as usual, around the American left to the rear as planned after getting off their second volley.

Taking the withdrawal of the first two lines as a full-blown retreat, the British advanced headlong into the third and final line of Maryland and Delaware regulars which awaited them on the hill. The 71st Highlanders were ordered to flank the American right. Howard spotted the flanking movement and ordered the Virginia militiamen manning the American right to turn and face the Scots. However, in the noise of battle, Howard's order was misunderstood and the militiamen began to withdraw. It was now 7:45 am, and the British had been fighting for nearly an hour. They were tired and disorganized, but they saw the Virginia militia on the rebels' right withdrawing and believed the Americans were on the run. They charged, breaking formation and advancing in a chaotic mass.

=== Patriot counterattack ===
Morgan ordered a volley. Howard's "fleeing" militia suddenly stopped their withdrawal and made an about-face. The Virginians fired into the British at a range of no more than 30 yards, with massive effect, causing their pursuers to lurch to a halt. Howard shouted, "Charge bayonets!" The Continentals in the center, as ordered, mounted a bayonet charge. Tarleton's force, faced with a terrible surprise, began to collapse; some men surrendered on the spot while others turned and ran. Howard's men charged forward and seized the two British grasshopper cannons. Washington's cavalry came around from behind the opposite American left and hit the British on their right flank and rear. Pickens's militia, having now reorganized, charged out from behind the hill, completing a 360-degree circle around the American position to hit the 71st Highlanders on Tarleton's left flank and rear. Howard ordered the Virginia militia, whose withdrawal had brought on the ill-fated British charge, to turn about and attack the Scots from the other direction.

The shock of the sudden charge, coupled with the reappearance of the American militiamen on the left flank where Tarleton's exhausted men expected to see their own cavalry, proved too much for the British. Nearly half of the British and Loyalist infantrymen fell to the ground whether they were wounded or not with their will to fight having gone. Babits diagnoses "combat shock" as the cause for this abrupt British collapse—the effects of exhaustion, hunger, and demoralization suddenly catching up with them. They were caught in a double envelopment which one writer compared to a small-scale version of the ancient Battle of Cannae. Many surrendered.

When Tarleton's right flank and center line collapsed, only a minority of the 71st Highlanders were putting up a fight against part of Howard's line. Tarleton rode back to his sole remaining intact troops, the cavalry of the British Legion. He ordered them to charge, but they refused orders and left the field. The Highlanders, surrounded by militia and Continentals, surrendered. Tarleton gathered about 40 cavalry, mostly men of the 17th plus officers, and tried to retrieve his two cannons, but they had been captured, and he too retreated from the field. Although their charge was initially effective, the dragoons, numbering about 50, were quickly surprised and outnumbered by Washington's concealed cavalry and they were driven back in disarray.

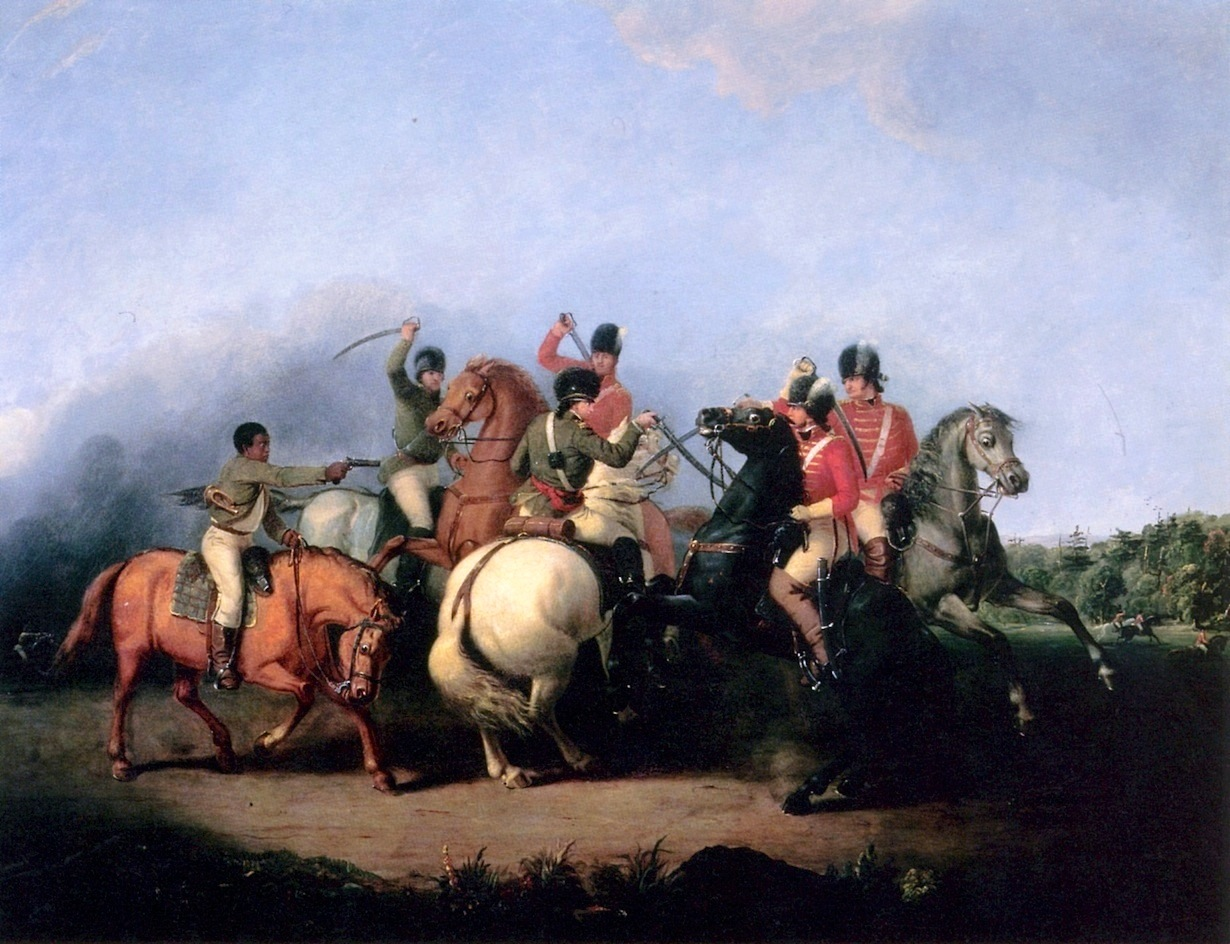
The Battle of Cowpens, painted by William Ranney in 1845.

A supposed "duel" between Continental and British cavalry became legendary. There are numerous versions of this alleged clash. Most say that Washington was pursuing British cavalry and became isolated. Many say that he was then attacked by Tarleton. Some say that a sword was broken but disagree whether it was Tarleton's or Washington's. Some say that Washington wounded Tarleton in the hand and the head.

The 1845 painting by William Ranney illustrates such a skirmish possibly based on the description in Marshall's Life of Washington. Aside from whether such an event occurred, the painting contains several errors, notably the colours of the uniforms and the depiction of a servant. Some say the unnamed man shown saving the life of Colonel Washington (on white horse in center) was his waiter, servant, or trumpeter, giving several names. Ranney depicted him as a Black man when he painted the incident 65 years later because he thought a servant ought to be Black, perhaps a slave.

Tarleton doesn't mention such a duel between him and Washington and clearly wasn't wounded. (He was wounded for the first and only time during the Battle of Guilford Courthouse.) Babits wrote “Howard’s comment that the British officer was “believed to be Tarleton” sums up the “duel.”

It was now 8:00 a.m., and the battle had lasted approximately one hour. Washington pursued Tarleton for 16 miles but gave up the chase when he came to the plantation of local planter Adam Goudylock near Thicketty Creek. Tarleton was able to escape capture by forcing Goudylock to serve as guide.

== Aftermath ==
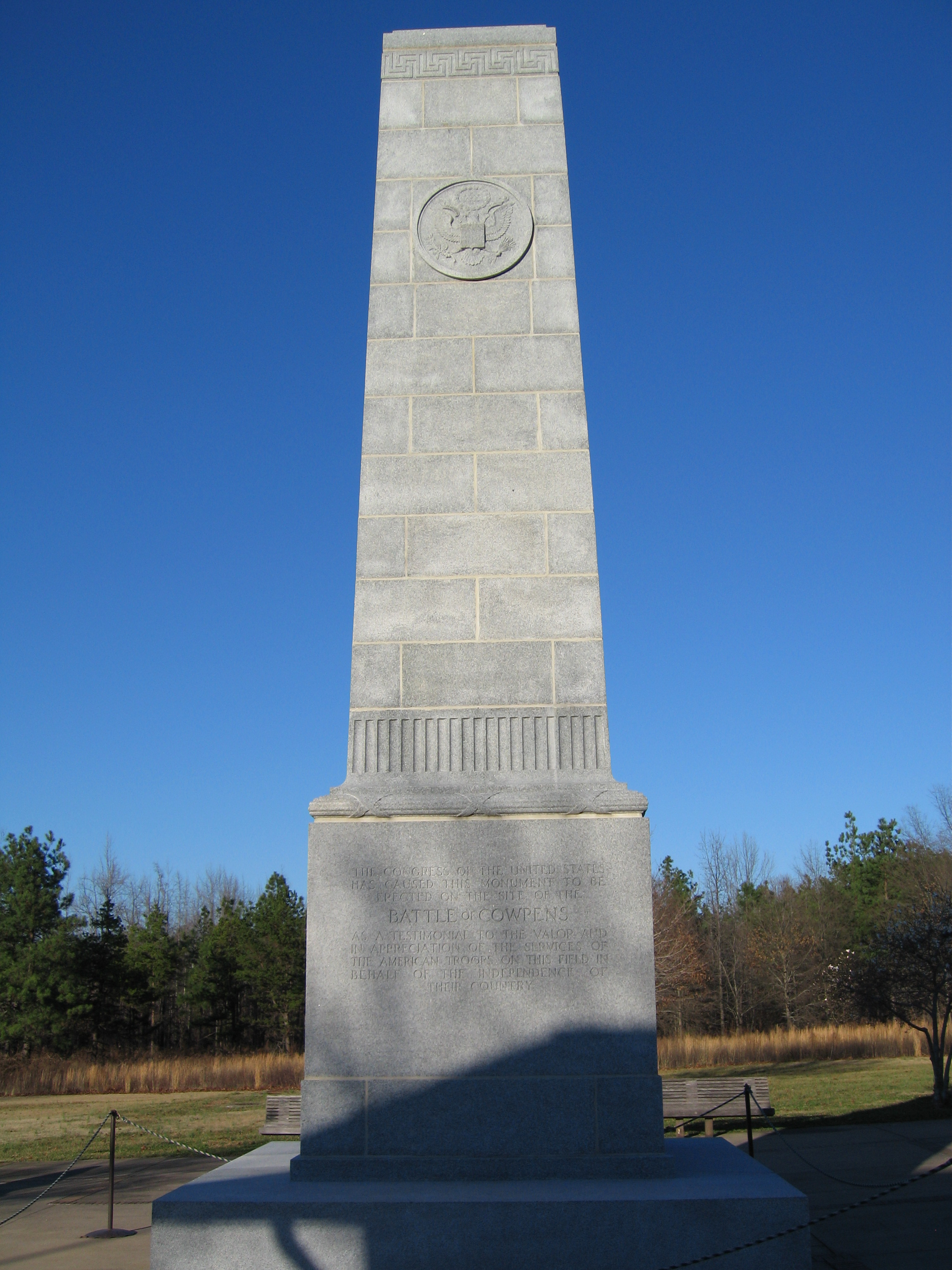
Battlefield monument

Morgan's army took 712 prisoners, 200 of whom were wounded. Some 110 officers and soldiers of Tarleton's force had been killed in action and all of his artillerymen were dead or severely wounded. Strategically, the battle meant that some of the best units in Cornwallis' army had been destroyed or severely weakened. Tarleton's infantry, which had suffered an 86% casualty rate, was no longer an effective fighting force. Howard quoted McArthur of the 71st Highlanders, now an American prisoner, as saying "he was an officer before Tarleton was born; that the best troops in the service were put under 'that boy' to be sacrificed." An American prisoner of war later recounted that when Tarleton reached Cornwallis and reported the disaster, Cornwallis placed his sword tip on the ground and leaned on it until the blade snapped.

Babits has demonstrated that Morgan's official report of 73 casualties appears to have only included his Continental troops. From surviving records, Babits identified by name 128 American officers and soldiers who were either killed or wounded at Cowpens. He also presents an entry in the North Carolina state records that shows 68 Continental and 80 militia casualties. It would appear that both the number of Morgan's casualties and the total strength of his force were about double what he officially reported.

Tarleton's apparent recklessness in pushing his command so hard in pursuit of Morgan may be explained because, up until Cowpens, every battle that he and his British Legion had fought in the South had been a relatively easy victory. He appears to have been so concerned with pursuing Morgan that he quite forgot that it was necessary for his men to be in a fit condition to fight once they caught him although Cornwallis did press Tarleton to take aggressive action.

Coming in the wake of the American defeat at Camden, Cowpens was a surprising victory and a turning point that affected the psychology of the entire war—"spiriting up the people," not only those of the backcountry Carolinas, but those in all the Southern states. The Americans were encouraged to fight further and the Loyalists and British were demoralized. Furthermore, its strategic result—the destruction of an important part of Cornwallis' army—was crucial toward ending the war. Along with the Loyalist defeat at Kings Mountain, Cowpens was a serious blow to Cornwallis who might have defeated much of the remaining American troops in South Carolina had Tarleton won at Cowpens. Instead, the battle set in motion a series of events leading to the end of the war. Cornwallis abandoned his pacification efforts in South Carolina, stripped his army of its excess baggage, and pursued Greene's force into North Carolina. Skirmishes occurred at the Catawba River (including the Battle of Cowan's Ford on February 1, 1781) and other fords. Yet, after a long chase, Cornwallis met Greene at the Battle of Guilford Court House, winning a victory, but so weakening his army that he withdrew to Wilmington to rest and refit. Later, when Cornwallis went into Virginia, Washington and his French ally Rochambeau seized this opportunity to trap and defeat him at the siege of Yorktown which caused the British to seek peace terms with the Americans that would acknowledge the United States' independence.

In the opinion of John Marshall, "Seldom has a battle, in which greater numbers were not engaged, been so important in its consequences as that of Cowpens." It gave Greene his chance to conduct a campaign of "dazzling shiftiness" that led Cornwallis by "an unbroken chain of consequences to the catastrophe at Yorktown which finally separated America from the British crown."

== Memorials ==
- The battle site is preserved at Cowpens National Battlefield.
- The Daniel Morgan Monument is in downtown Spartanburg.
- Two ships of the U.S. Navy have been named USS Cowpens in honor of the battle.
- Three current Army National Guard units (116th Inf, 175th Inf, and 198th Sig Bn) are derived from American units that participated in the Battle of Cowpens. There are only 30 Army National Guard and active Regular Army units with lineages that go back to the colonial era.

== See also ==
- American Revolutionary War § War in the South. Places ' Battle of Cowpens ' in overall sequence and strategic context.
