= Fishing Creek (Catawba River) =

Stream in North Carolina and South Carolina, United States

Coordinates: 34°35′41″N 80°53′44″W

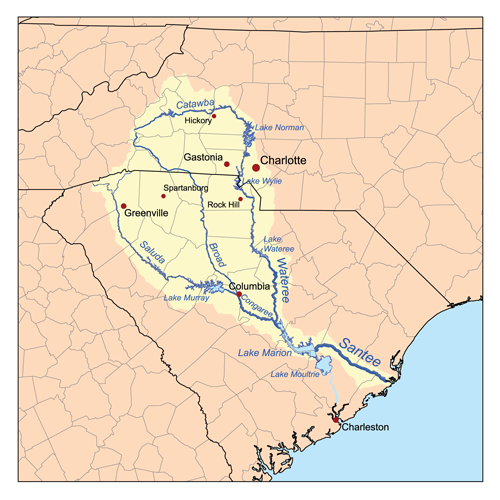
Santee drainage basin

Fishing Creek is a stream located in South Carolina, United States and is a part of the inland Catawba-Wateree drainage basin. Its elevation is 354 feet (108 m) and flows through Chester and York Counties.

The Fishing Creek watershed drains approximately 288 square miles in the Piedmont region of South Carolina's York and Chester Counties. The creek enters into the Catawba River downstream of Fishing Creek Hydroelectric Station and the Fishing Creek Reservoir near Great Falls, South Carolina.

Though sharing the same name, Fishing Creek in South Carolina is not part of the same watershed as Fishing Creek in coastal North Carolina. The North Carolina creek belongs to the Tar River system within the Atlantic coastal drainage basin.

== See also ==
- Battle of Fishing Creek
