= Lord Weir =

Lord Weir may refer to:

- William Weir, 1st Viscount Weir (1877–1959), Scottish industrialist and politician
- James Kenneth Weir, 2nd Viscount Weir, (1905–1975), Scottish industrialist
- William Weir, 3rd Viscount Weir (born 1933), Scottish industrialist
- Bruce Weir, Lord Weir (born 1931), Scottish judge
- Robert Weir, Lord Weir (born 1967), Scottish judge; son of the above
- Peter Weir, Baron Weir of Ballyholme (born 1968), Northern Irish politician
