= Keefer =

Keefer is the surname of:

- Charles Keefer (1852–1932), Canadian engineer
- Chester Keefer (1897–1972), American physician, medical researcher, and medical school dean
- Don Keefer (1916–2014), American actor
- Francis Henry Keefer (1860–1928), Canadian lawyer and politician
- George Keefer (1921–1985), Canadian World War II flying ace and wing commander
- Janice Kulyk Keefer (born 1952), Canadian novelist and poet
- Johnny Keefer (born 2001), American professional golfer
- Mel Keefer (1926–2022), American artist
- Philip B. Keefer (1875–1949), United States Navy sailor and a recipient of the Medal of Honor
- Thomas Keefer (1821–1915), Canadian civil engineer

== See also ==
- Keefers, British Columbia, Canada, a railway point and ghost town
- Kefer, a surname
- Kiefer, a given name and surname
- Kiefer, Oklahoma, United States, a town

== See also ==
- Kefer, another surname
- Kiefer, a given name and surname
- Kefir, a fermented milk dring
