= Kipfer =

Kipfer is a surname. Notable people with the surname include:

- Barbara Ann Kipfer (born 1954), American lexicographer, linguist, ontologist and part-time archaeologist
- Christian Kipfer (1921–2009), Swiss gymnast
- Ernst Kipfer (1915–2016), Swiss footballer

== See also ==
- Kiefer
