= Winnie Ye =

Canadian electronics engineer

Winnie N. Ye is a Canadian electronics engineer specializing in silicon-based photonics. She is a professor of electronics at Carleton University.

== Education and career ==
Ye's parents are both computer scientist professors. She studied electrical engineering as an undergraduate at Carleton University. After earning a master's degree in electrical and computer engineering from the University of Toronto, she returned to Carleton for her Ph.D.

She was supported by NSERC as a postdoctoral researcher at the Massachusetts Institute of Technology and Harvard University. She joined the Carleton faculty in 2009 as Canada Research Chair (Tier II) in Nano-scale IC Design for Reliable Opto-Electronics and Sensors, which she held until 2021.

== Recognition ==
Ye was the 2018 winner of the IEEE Women in Engineering Inspiring Member of the Year Award. In 2020, Ye was named as a Fellow of the Engineering Institute of Canada, and as chair of Women in Engineering for IEEE Canada. She has also chaired the Optoelectronics Technical Group of Optica.
