= Kefer =

Kefer is a surname. Notable people with the surname include:

- Franz Xaver Kefer (1763–1802), German educator
- Jan Kefer (1906–1941), Czech astrologer, hermeticist and publicist
- Rose Hobart, born Rose Kefer (1906–2000), American actress

== See also ==
- Portrait of Jeanne Kéfer, 1885 painting by Fernand Khnopff
- Keefer, a surname
- Kiefer, a given name and surname
