= John Jonas =

Canadian engineer (1932–2025)

John Joseph Jonas
- Born: December 8, 1932; Montreal, Quebec, Canada
- Died: February 3, 2025 (aged 92); Montreal, Quebec, Canada
- Education: McGill University; University of Cambridge
- Occupation: Professor of Metallurgy
- Awards: Order of Canada; National Order of Quebec

John J. Jonas (December 8, 1932 – February 3, 2025) was a Canadian engineer.

== Biography ==
Jonas was born in Montreal and graduated from McGill University with a bachelor's degree in Metallurgical Engineering in 1954. He later attended Cambridge University on an Athlone Fellowship and received a Ph.D. degree in Mechanical Sciences in 1960. On returning to Montreal, he began teaching "mechanical metallurgy" at McGill and built up a research laboratory that includes a number of specialized testing machines and is particularly well equipped for experimental investigations in the field of high temperature deformation.

Jonas is known internationally for the ground breaking studies that he and his students and colleagues have carried out at McGill on the hot rolling behaviour of metals. Their work has resulted in major improvements in the understanding of the softening processes involved in steel processing; these have led to more accurate computer models for the control of industrial rolling mills. They have published over eight hundred technical papers dealing with the scientific and engineering aspects of metal shaping and forming. They have received numerous awards for this work, including the Réaumur and Gold Medals of the French Metallurgical Society, the Hatchett Medal of the Metals Society (U.K.), the Airey, Dofasco and Alcan Awards of the Canadian Institute of Mining and Metallurgy, the Gold Medal of the Canadian Metal Physics Association, the NSERC Award of Excellence, the Canada Council Killam Award, the Michael Tenenbaum Award of the American Institute of Metallurgical Engineers, the Hunt Silver Medal of the US Iron and Steel Society, the Barrett Silver Medal and G. Macdonald Young Award of the American Society for Metals, the Alexander von Humboldt Research Award (Germany), and the Sawamura Award of the Iron and Steel Institute of Japan. Professor Jonas has been elected a Fellow of the American Society for Metals, Royal Society of Canada, Canadian Academy of Engineering, Canadian Institute of Mining and Metallurgy, and Hungarian Academy of Sciences. He was an Honorary Member of the Iron and Steel Institute of Japan and of the Indian Institute of Metals. He was made an Officer of the Order of Canada in 1993, a Chevalier of the Order of Quebec in 2000, and received the Quebec prize for science (Prix du Québec - Marie Victorin) in 1995. He has served as a visiting professor in a number of countries, including Argentina, Australia, Belgium, Brazil, China, France, Germany, Hungary, India, Iran, Israel, Japan, Mexico, the Netherlands, South Africa, South Korea, Spain, Taiwan, the UK, the US and the USSR.

In 1985, Jonas was appointed to the CSIRA/NSERC Chair of Steel Processing at McGill, a position which was funded jointly by the Canadian Steel Industry Research Association and the Natural Sciences and Engineering Research Council of Canada. In this capacity, he worked closely with the Canadian steel industry, and collaborated in the solution of a number of important processing problems. Dr. Jonas also held the Birks Chair of Metallurgy. He and his colleagues have been granted five sets of international patents associated with steel rolling, three of which have been assigned to the sponsoring companies.

Jonas served on the Quebec Science Council (Conseil de la science et de la technologie) from 1987 to 1990, and as Chairman of the AECL (Atomic Energy of Canada Limited) R&D Advisory Panel in 1992 and 1993. His h-index (Hirsch number) was 92 and he had more than 32,000 citations to his credit.

Jonas died at his home on February 3, 2025, at the age of 92.
