= Swiss Medical Weekly =

- Discipline: Medicine
- Language: English
- Edited by: Adriano Aguzzi and Gérard Waeber

Publication details
- Former names: Correspondenz-Blatt für Schweizer Aerzte, Schweizerische Medizinische Wochenschrift
- History: 1871-present
- Publisher: SMW supporting association
- Frequency: continuous online
- Impact factor: 4.203 (2021)

Standard abbreviations
- ISO 4: Swiss Med. Wkly.

Indexing
- ISSN: 1424-3997
- OCLC no.: 807721576

Links
- Journal homepage; Online archive

The Swiss Medical Weekly is a peer-reviewed open access medical journal published by the SMW supporting association.

It was established in 1871 as the Correspondenz-Blatt für Schweizer Aerzte, then renamed to Schweizerische Medizinische Wochenschrift (1920–2000), before obtaining its current title in 2001.

The SMW was one of the first journals to adhere to the principles of Diamond open access (also known as Platinum open access). The editors-in-chief is Gérard Waeber (University of Lausanne).

== Abstracting and indexing ==
The journal is abstracted and indexed in:

- Directory of Open Access Journals
- EMBASE
- MEDLINE/PubMed
- Science Citation Index Expanded

According to the Journal Citation Reports, the journal has a 2021 impact factor of 4.203.

== Important papers ==
In 1957, Roland Kuhn published an observational study on the effectiveness of imipramine in treating depression. Other examples are the fundoplication described by Rudolf Nissen in 1956 and the first description of a haemolytic-uraemic syndrome by Conrad Gasser in 1955.

== See also ==
- Revue Médicale Suisse
