= Revue Médicale Suisse =

Revue médicale suisse
- Discipline: Medicine
- Language: French
- Edited by: Bertrand Kiefer

Publication details
- History: 2005-present
- Publisher: Groupe Médecine & Hygiène (Switzerland)
- Frequency: Weekly

Standard abbreviations
- ISO 4: Rev. Méd. Suisse

Indexing
- ISSN: 1660-9379
- OCLC no.: 494557199

Links
- Journal homepage; Online archive

The Revue médicale suisse (French pronunciation: [ʁəvy medikal sɥis]) is a weekly peer-reviewed medical journal published in French and aimed at the continuing medical education of medical practitioners and the francophone medical community in general.

== History ==
The journal was established in 2005 as the result of a merger between the Revue médicale de la Suisse romande and Médecine & Hygiène.

== Abstracting and indexing ==
The journal is abstracted and indexed in Index Medicus/MEDLINE/PubMed, Embase, EMCare, and Scopus.

== See also ==
- Swiss Medical Weekly
