= Keifer =

Keifer may refer to:

- Keifer, a microprocessor architecture
- Joseph Warren Keifer (1836–1932), United States Army general and Speaker of the House
- Tom Keifer (born 1961), United States rock musician
- Keifer, a character from the horror comic series Witch Creek Road

== See also ==
- Kiefer (disambiguation)
- Kefir, a fermented milk drink
