= ESCO Group =

United States manufacturing corporation

ESCO Group LLC
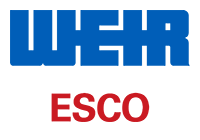
- Type: Division
- Industry: Mining and minerals
- Founded: 1913; 113 years ago
- Headquarters: Portland, Oregon, U.S.
- Key people: Sean Fitzgerald, Division President
- Products: Wear parts for industrial applications
- Parent: Weir Group
- Website: www.escocorp.com

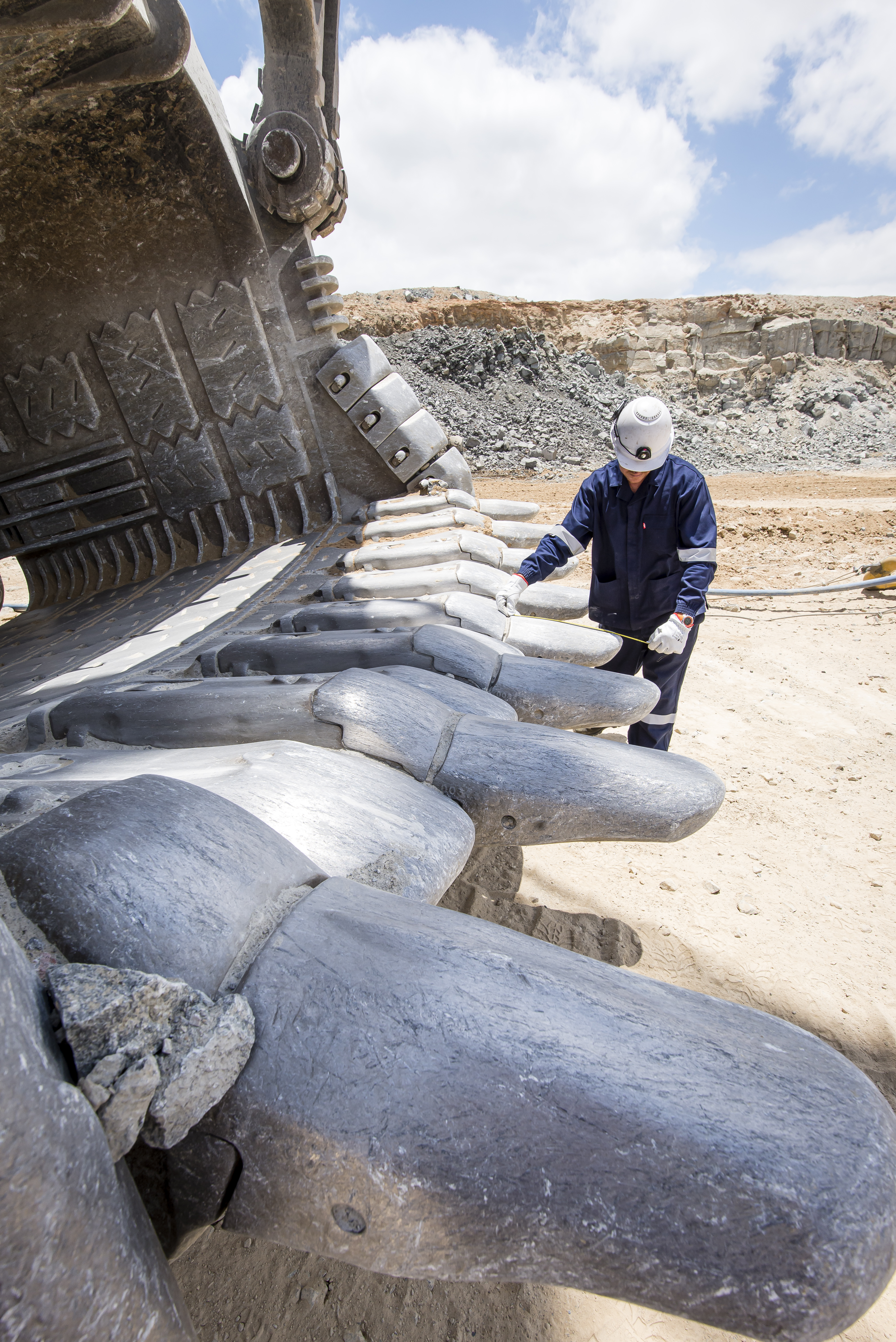
Mine operator and ESCO tooth system shown at a surface mine site

ESCO Group LLC is a manufacturer of engineered metal wear parts and components for industrial applications—including mining and construction. Since 1913, the company, which is a division of Weir Group PLC, has been headquartered in Portland, Oregon, United States.

== History ==
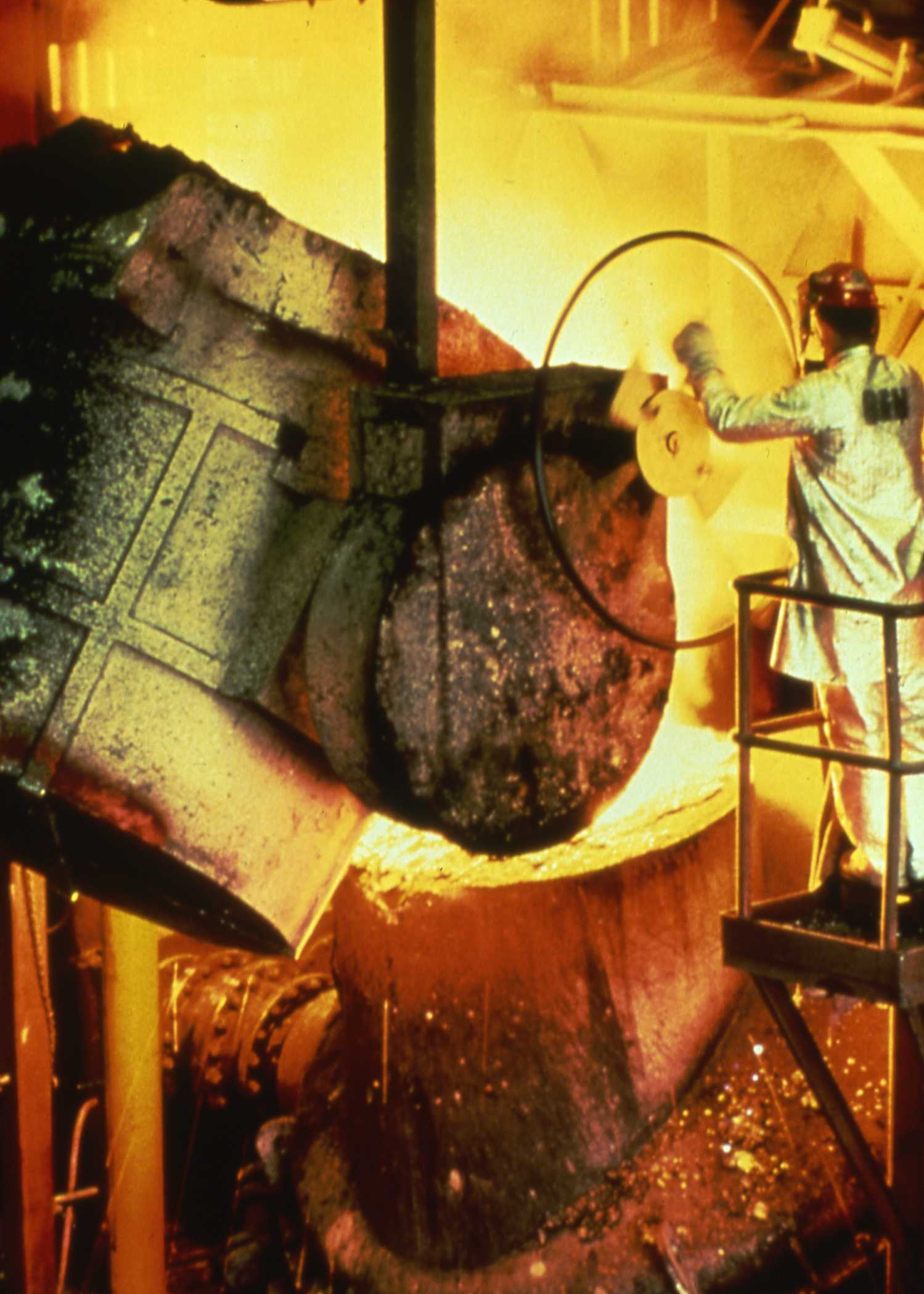
A ladle of hot metal is poured in an archival photo taken at a former ESCO foundry in Portland, Ore.

ESCO was founded in 1913 by Oregon businessman Charles (C.F.) Swigert as a local source of steel castings. The Electric Steel Foundry Company was founded on property once occupied by the 1905 Lewis and Clark Centennial Exposition.

During its first 30 years, ESCO was mainly a regional supplier of cast steel alloy products for the logging, construction, and pulp and paper industry throughout the Pacific Northwest. In the 1920s, the company expanded production to include cast steel alloy products. The ESCO trademark was first used in 1926 and eventually became the company's new name.

ESCO survived the Great Depression primarily as a jobbing foundry, making castings for sawmills, pulp and paper mills. In 1932, ESCO opened its first stainless steel industrial service center. During the 1940s, ESCO added new products to meet demand for supply valves, pump bodies, anchor chains and other components for warships and tanks. Postwar productions saw reforms to the company structure.

In 1983, ESCO bought Hyster Company, and then sold it in 1989 to NACCO Industries.

During the 1990s, ESCO expanded operations in the United States, the United Kingdom and Canada and entered a joint venture to manufacture products in China. The company also acquired Heflin Steel, producing wear liners and armor plate.

The company announced plans for an initial public offering in May 2011 that could raise as much as $175 million. The company canceled plans for an IPO in May 2013.

On December 28, 2012, Esco Corporation sold Turbine Technologies Group (Esco-TTG) to Consolidated Precision Products (CPP).

ESCO announced the acquisition of Texas-based Ulterra Drilling Technologies L.P. in August 2012 in a deal estimated at $325 million. In 2014, ESCO acquired another Texas-based company, Stabiltec Downhole Tools, LLC., further adding to the company's oil and gas portfolio.

On April 19, 2018, ESCO entered into an agreement to be acquired by The Weir Group PLC, one of the world's leading engineering businesses, for an enterprise value of $1.285 billion. The acquisition was completed on July 12, 2018.

== Plant closures and violation of U.S. trade sanction with Cuba ==
Commencing in 2013, ESCO has closed multiple manufacturing and service facilities in recent years, citing a protracted downturn and declining customer demand for their products. In January 2013, ESCO closed the Northgate, Australia foundry they purchased in 2010. In September, 2014 ESCO closed another foundry located in Guisborough, England. In February 2015, ESCO announced the closure of a large foundry in Nisku, Canada. ESCO laid off an estimated 25% of their manufacturing work force at their Port Hope, Canada facility in 2014 and made further cuts in 2015. ESCO announced the closure of another foundry in Dunedin, New Zealand in September, 2015. In November 2015, ESCO announced that they would be eliminating 247 employees when closing the main production plant that adjoins the North American headquarters.

In 2014, the Wall Street Journal reported that ESCO Corporation agreed to pay a $2.1 Million fine for violating U.S. sanctions imposed on Cuba. In the official penalty notice, the U.S. Treasury Department concluded that ESCO acted with "reckless disregard" and "caused significant harm" to the U.S. sanctions program on Cuba by conducting large-volume and high-value transactions in products made from Cuban-origin nickel, "which were ultimately sourced" from people on the U.S. blacklist.

== Pollution ==
In November 2011 ESCO and Portland neighborhood representatives signed a Good Neighbor Agreement, which includes an implementation schedule for 17 emission reduction projects over five years. As of April 2014, 12 of 16 projects are completed, and one ongoing project with no completion date. Several of the projects are related to improving or adding control devices to capture particulate matter and metal emissions. It also includes projects related to chemical substitution to reduce organic compound emissions, and projects requiring additional or modified procedures or operations to improve emission capture.

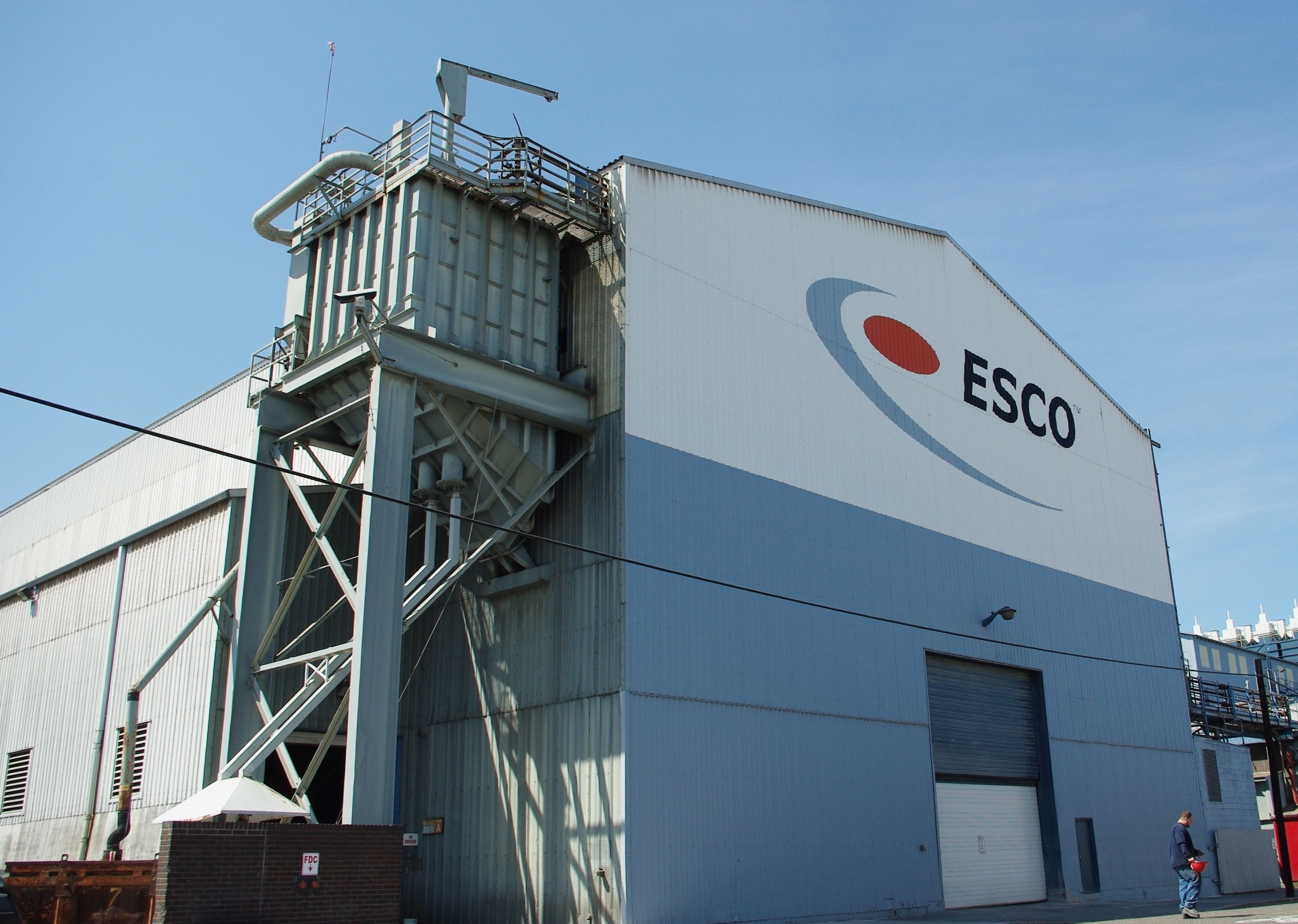
Former plant in Northwest Portland

== See also ==
- List of companies based in Oregon
