= Loanhead of Daviot stone circle =

Recumbent stone circle in Aberdeenshire

Loanhead of Daviot
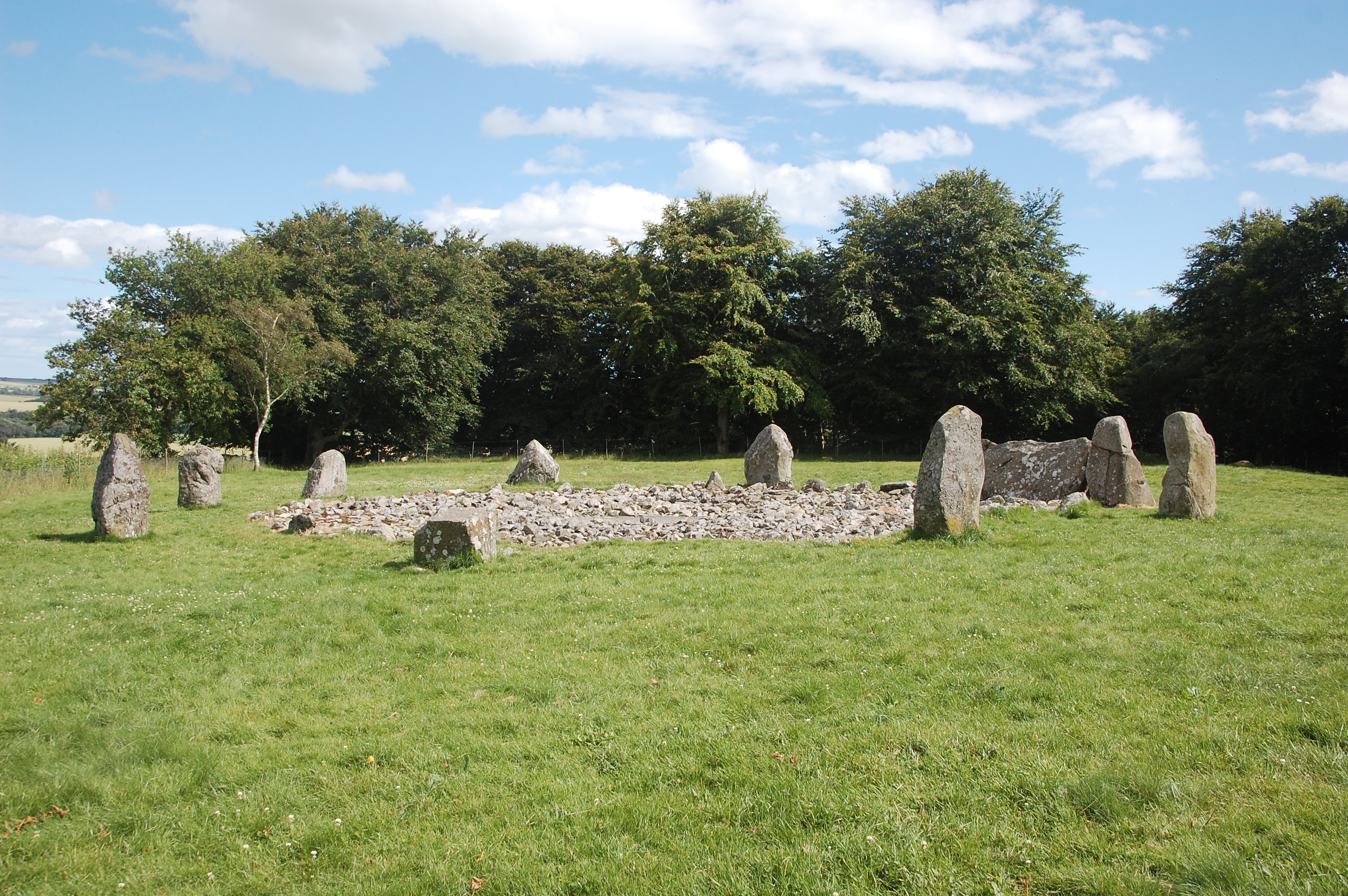
- Stone circle in 2017
- Interactive map of Loanhead of Daviot
- 57.349445°N 2.4210453°W
- Type: Recumbent stone circle
- Periods: Neolithic, Bronze Age
- Location: Scotland
- Region: Aberdeenshire
- OS grid reference: NJ747288

Site notes
- Material: Granite
- Height: 2.26 metres (7 ft 5 in) maximum
- Diameter: 21 metres (69 ft)
- Excavation dates: 1934, 1935
- Archaeologists: H.E. Kilbride-Jones
- Management: State
- Public access: Yes

Scheduled monument
- Official name: Loanhead stone circle
- Type: Prehistoric ritual and funerary: enclosed cremation cemetery; stone circle or ring
- Designated: 31 August 1925
- Reference no.: SM90202

Loanhead of Daviot stone circle is a recumbent stone circle in Aberdeenshire in lowland northeast Scotland. The circle consists of the recumbent stone with its flankers and a complete set of eight orthostats about 21 metres (69 ft) in diameter surrounding a low kerbed ring cairn which has an open court. However, the present appearance has in part been produced by substantial restoration after archaeological excavation in 1934, and in 1989 by the removal of the stones covering the central court.

The recumbent setting is at the south-south-west of the circle but the recumbent stone itself is angled somewhat towards the south. Immediately to the east-south-east is a cremation cemetery approximately contemporary with the circle.

== Recumbent stone circles ==
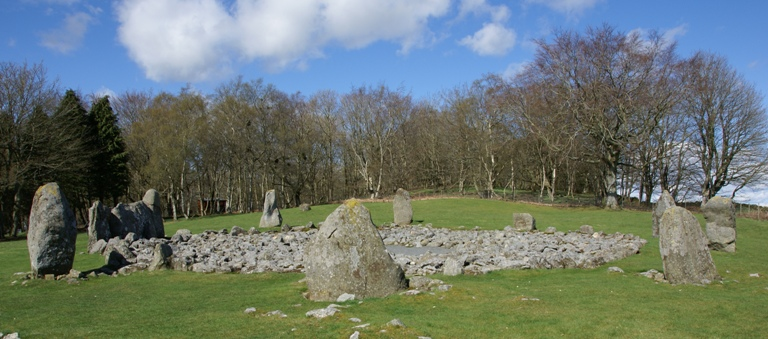
Loanhead of Daviot stone circle from the east

These stone circles consist of a circle of upright stones, the orthostats, with a particularly large megalith, the recumbent, lying on its side with its long axis generally aligned with the perimeter of the ring between the south and southwest. On each side of the recumbent is a tall pillar-like stone called a flanker. This type of ring is found in lowland Aberdeenshire in northeast Scotland – the most similar monuments are the axial stone circles of southwest Ireland. Recumbent stone circles generally enclosed a low ring cairn, though over the millennia these have often disappeared. They may have been a development from the Clava cairns found nearby in Inverness-shire and axial stone circles may have followed the design.

== General description ==
=== Stone circle ===
Plan of circle and cemetery

Loanhead of Daviot stone circle is situated on a ridge above the village of Daviot in Aberdeenshire in lowland northeast Scotland at grid reference NJ 747 288. It became a scheduled monument (SM90202) in 1925 and was taken into state guardianship in 1933. The circle was constructed of granite in the early Bronze Age and is one of only very few recumbent stone circles that has all of its stones in place – the recumbent stone with its two flankers and eight more orthostats. The ring is some 21 metres (69 ft) in diameter and the recumbent setting is at the south-south-west of the circumference.

The recumbent stone is angled slightly towards the south and it has a vertical split lengthways along a natural weakness in the rock so that it now looks like two parallel slabs, one in front of the other. The recumbent was originally about 3.4 metres (11 ft) long and the taller slab to the rear (to the inside of the circle) is about 1.8 metres (5 ft 11 in) high. The recumbent and flankers are set in an artificially constructed platform of boulders. The top of the western 2.26-metre (7 ft 5 in) flanker was replaced as part of archaeological excavations and restoration in 1934–1935 and the eastern 1.73-metre (5 ft 8 in) flanker, which had fallen, was replaced in its original socket. This latter stone has a single cupmark on its inner face slightly above the ground. Ruggles has published the orientation of the recumbent setting using various measures giving the azimuth from the centre of the ring between 196° and 202°. (Note: Coles in 1902 measured the azimuth from the centre as 180°. The perpendicular to the axis of the recumbent is at 187°.) Of the orthostats, those on the eastern perimeter (4 – 7 on plan) decrease in height from south to north whereas those on the west (11 – 8) are generally about equal in height but, because they are set on sloping ground, they look as if graded. The orthostat next to the cupmarked eastern flanker bears twelve shallow cupmarks and the next stone has two cupmarks.

On excavation, pottery was found across the site, the earliest dating from the Early Neolithic.

==== Size of stones in circle ====
The table is of approximate stone dimensions (in metres) is derived from Welfare. The stones are numbered anticlockwise starting from the (1) west flanker, (2) recumbent, (3) east flanker and (4–11) orthostats as in the plan above.

Size of stones (metres)	1	2	3	4	5	6	7	8	9	10	11
Height	2.26	1.80	1.73+	2.09	1.59	1.48	1.43	1.80	0.74+	1.74	1.82
Width	1.32	3.44	1.49	1.49	1.50	1.26	0.87	0.87	0.90	0.94	1.06
Thickness	0.81	1.34	0.45	0.77	0.88	0.38	0.65	0.70	0.70	0.43	0.79

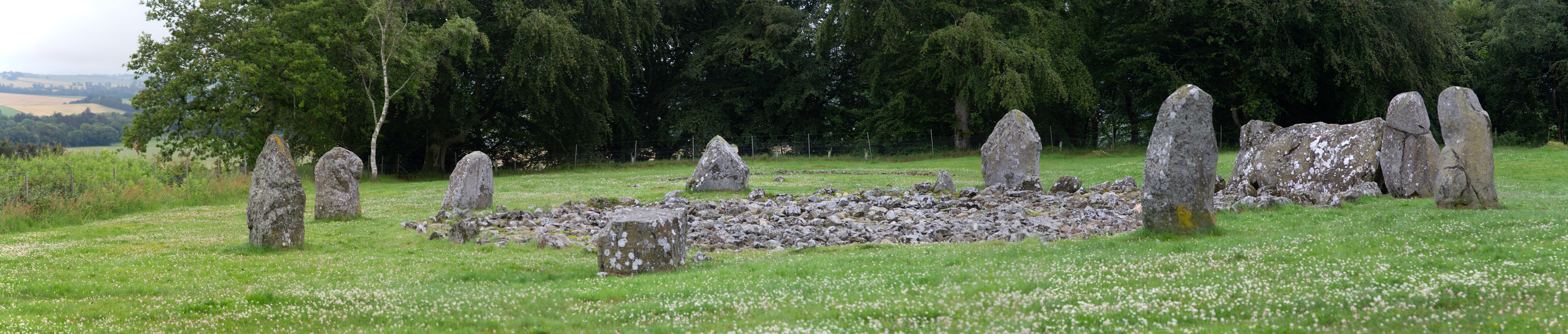
View from the west with interior kerb cairn and cemetery behind

=== Kerbed ring cairn ===
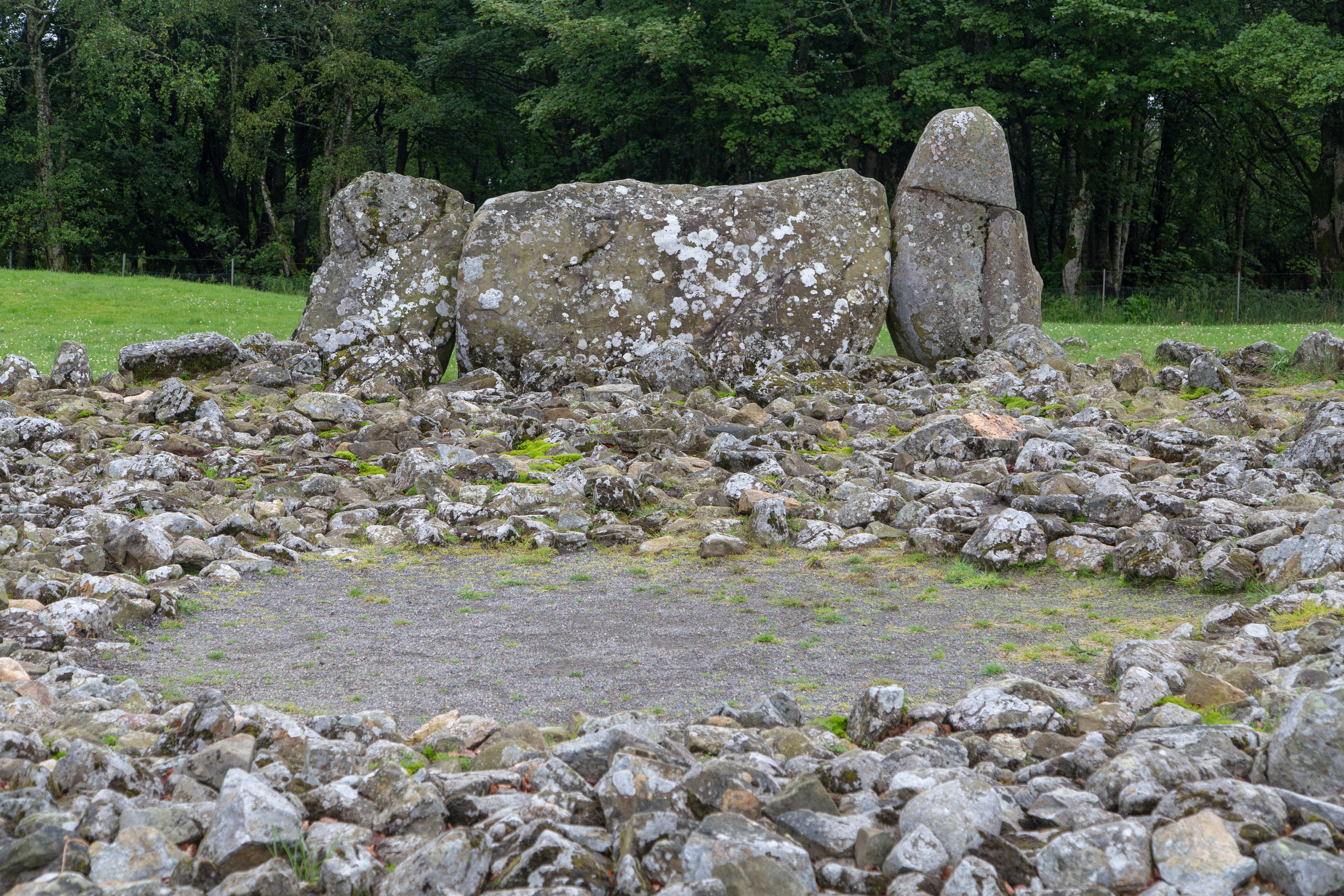
Kerbed ring cairn

The central cairn is somewhat polygonal in shape and is 16 metres (52 ft) in diameter and up to 0.3 metres (1 ft 0 in) high – because it has been reconstructed it is difficult to know its original state. There are 38 kerb stones around the southern perimeter of the cairn, increasing in size as they near the recumbent. In 1989 stones in the middle of the cairn were removed to give the appearance of a ring cairn with an internal court some 4.3 metres (14 ft) in diameter. Behind (within) the recumbent setting the line of kerb stones becomes double in the same way as at Tomnaverie stone circle. A platform of stones stretched beyond the kerbstones out to beyond the orthostats but most had been removed before the excavations and few remain visible now.

== Archaeological investigation, excavation and reconstruction ==
=== Stone circle and cairn ===
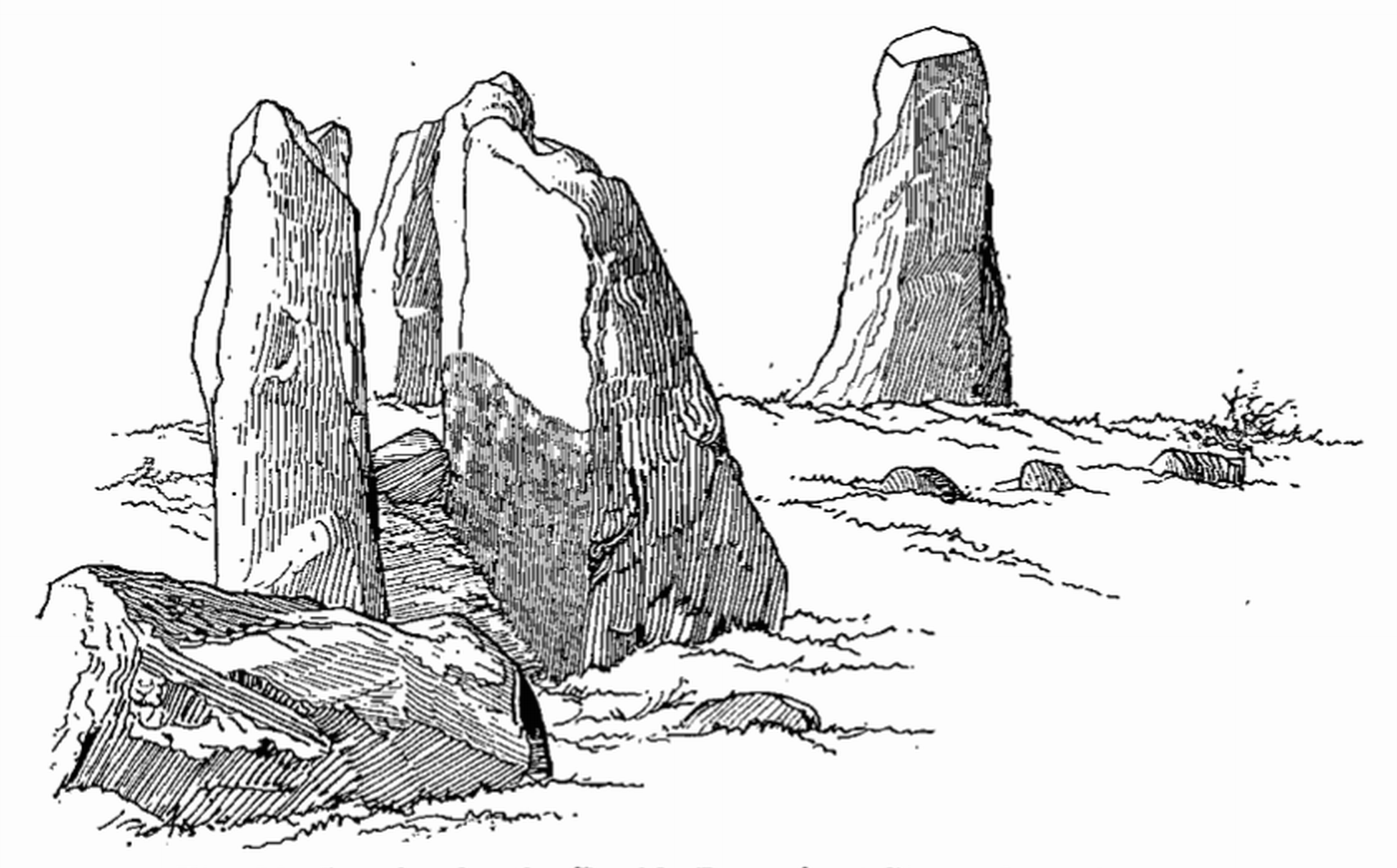
The two slabs of the recumbent as drawn by Coles in 1901

Frederick Coles was the first person to make a detailed record of the site. In 1901 he found the east flanker and four orthostats lying on the ground. Only the upper parts of the split recumbent were visible and he concluded that the two slabs had always been separate and in this respect the recumbent was unique. He explicitly ruled out the possibility that they had split apart because "the two surfaces do not present any of that correspondence of form in detail as if they could be fitted into one another". In 1918 James Ritchie considered that the recumbent had been a single block that had split apart and he discovered the cupmarks.

In 1934 Howard Kilbride-Jones led a major excavation of the site after it had come into state care. (Note: The PSAS scan of Kilbride-Jones' paper omits his Plate I, the overall plan of the excavated site but Plate I is available online elsewhere.) Cremated bones and over 100 sherds of probable late Bronze Age pottery were found when the top 0.3–0.6 metres (1 ft 0 in – 2 ft 0 in) of soil were removed and the kerb stones were also discovered. Kilbride-Jones uncovered an open court (without kerb stones) or a large pit at the centre of the cairn – it is now thought it was probably a pit. Kilbride-Jones thought the recumbent had been placed before the cairn was built and this has recently found support (Note: Unlike at Tomnaverie stone circle where the recumbent is thought to have been sited long after the cairn had been constructed.) Another current view is that the recumbent had been one of the earliest features to have been constructed. In summary, the earliest finds are Neolithic sherds of pottery, the recumbent was set in the early Bronze Age, and most of the sherds are from the late Bronze Age. In 1989 the stones were removed from the 4.3-metre-diameter (14 ft) central area of the ring cairn and the site was re-turfed. Welfare considers that the cairn originally lacked a court but that a ring cairn might have been briefly created around 1000 BCE.

=== Cremation circle ===
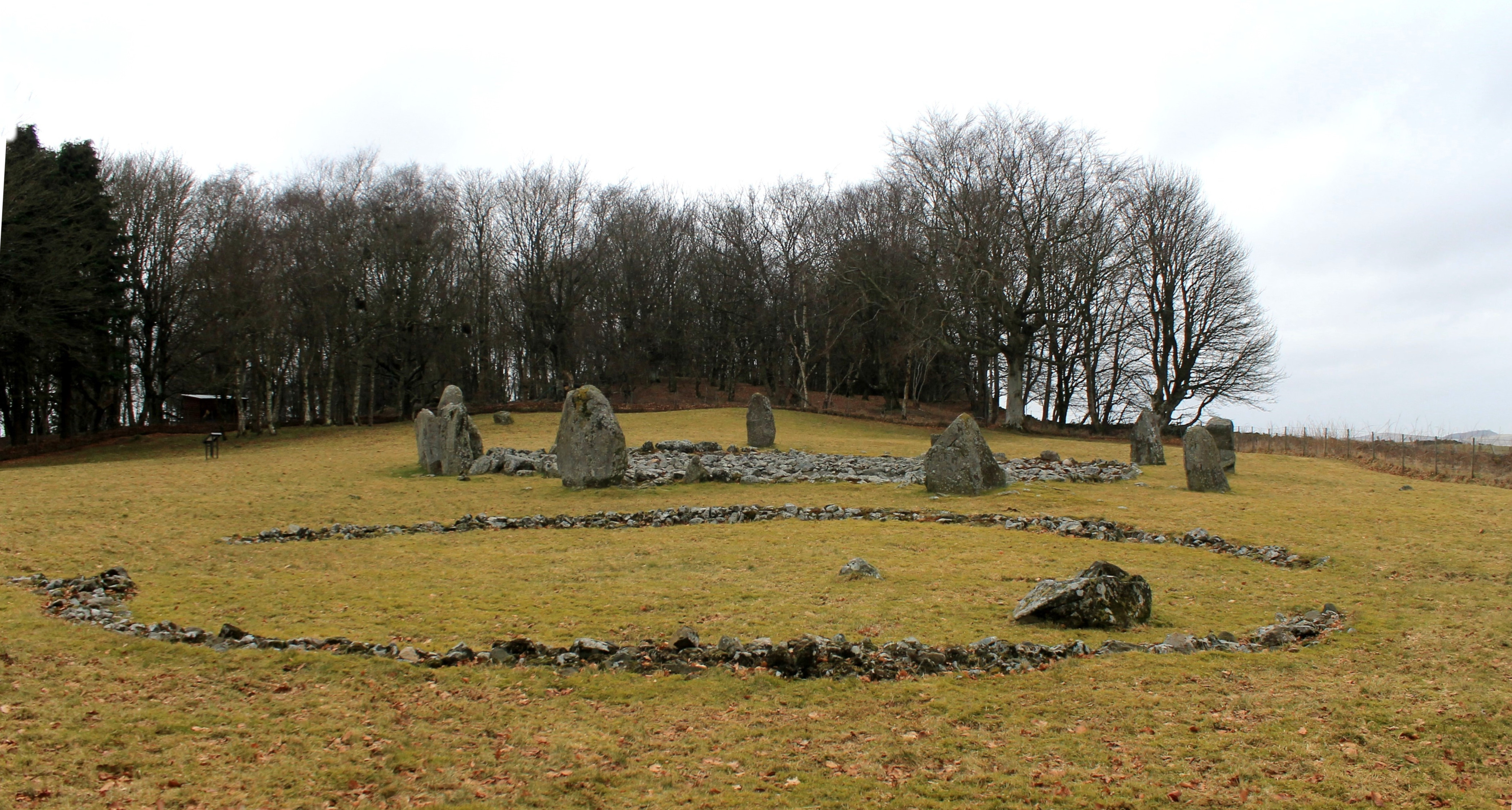
Cremation circle looking from the east with the stone circle behind

Towards the end of the 1934 season Kilbride-Jones uncovered, at the eastern edge of his excavation site, a cist 0.56 by 0.32 metres (22 in × 12.5 in) in internal dimensions containing an incense cup and cremated human bones. Next season he excavated further and discovered the cist was on the northern edge of a sunken stone wall about 10 metres (33 ft) in diameter enclosing a cemetery whose presence was entirely unexpected. However, it now seems more likely the wall was of timber, later burnt down, which was packed with stone. (Note: RCAHMS (2007) cites this opinion to Bruck (2004)) Dated to 1000–2000 BCE, the cemetery was the scene of successive pyres leaving cremated remains of at least 31 humans spread amongst twelve urns and thirteen pits. Since excavation, the cremation deposits can no longer be located so no carbon dating has been possible.
