= William Robinson Clark =

Scottish-Canadian theologian (1829–1912)

William Robinson Clark FRSC
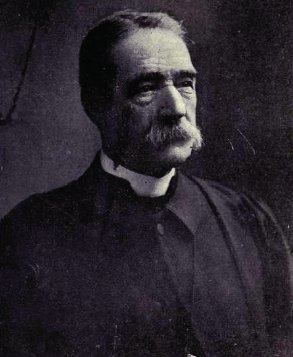
- Born: 26 March 1829; Daviot, Aberdeenshire, Scotland
- Died: 12 November 1912 (aged 83); Toronto, Ontario, Canada
- Education: King's College, Aberdeen; Hertford College, Oxford

William Robinson Clark FRSC (26 March 1829 – 12 November 1912) was a Scottish-Canadian theologian.

== Biography ==
Clark was born in Daviot, Aberdeenshire, son of Rev. James Clark. Originally educated for the Congregationalist ministry at New College London, he later conformed to the Church of England. After graduating from King's College, Aberdeen MA with honours, he went to Hertford College, Oxford. Foster's 'Alumni Oxonienses' indicates that his BA was conferred by Oxford in 1864 and his MA in 1865.

Immediately after leaving New College, London he became minister of the Congregational Church at Lymington, Hampshire. He entered the Church of England in 1856, a fact attributed by his former tutor William Farrer (1820–1908) to the influence of Clark's wife. He was the Curate of St Matthias, Birmingham, 1857–1858, and then the Dean of Taunton and prebendary of Wells Cathedral from 1859 to 1880. He was frequently selected to preach in St. Paul's Cathedral and Westminster Abbey.

In 1882, aged about 53, he emigrated to Canada and became the Professor of Mental and Moral Philosophy at Trinity College, Toronto, Ontario (from 1883 to 1908). He was noted as a lecturer and preacher. He was also Professor of Theology at Toronto University. He resigned his chair in the college in 1909, after occupying it for twenty-five years. From that date to the time of his death he held the title of Emeritus Professor and as such he sat ex officio on the Council of Trinity College.

In recognition of his services to the Church and to education he was created a Canon of St. Alban's Cathedral, the Cathedral Church of St. James (Toronto), by the third Bishop of Toronto, Arthur Sweatman. Among these services was the help he rendered in the formation of the General Synod of the Church of England in Canada, in 1893.

He was described as one of the foremost theologians in North America, and there are records of him delivering lectures in Michigan. Amongst honours and distinctions which were bestowed upon him by institutions of learning were the degrees of D.C.L., conferred by Trinity College Toronto; D.D., conferred by Queen's University, Kingston; and LL.D., conferred by Hobart College, Geneva, USA - now part of the Hobart and William Smith Colleges in 1888; his appointment by the University of Michigan as Baldwin Lecturer in 1887, and as Slocum Lecturer in 1889; his appointment as Honorary Professor of Hobart College, Geneva, (USA) in 1888. He was eminent in the councils of the Church of England in Canada.

He became a Fellow of the Royal Society of Canada. He was elected in 1891 and later served as President of the Society from 1899 – 1900. It seems that he was involved in the formation of the Empire Club of Canada, and became President of the Empire Club of Canada 1905 – 1906.

In Canada, he also became a close friend of the long-time Prime Minister and political figure, William Lyon Mackenzie King (1874–1950), who was also of Scottish descent, and the Reverend William Robinson Clark is referred to in the Archives of Canada.

Following his death, the Corporation of Trinity College, at its annual meeting on 21 November 1912, adopted a resolution recording the great debt of gratitude it owed to Professor Clark. The resolution proceeded to say:

"As a Preacher and public Lecturer, Professor Clark was very highly esteemed, and his many engagements in these capacities served to make Trinity College favourably known far and near. He showed remarkable versatility and brilliancy in his work, both in the class room and on the public platform, as well as in his literary productions, which embrace Theology, History, and Literature. Dr. Clark's singular devotion to Trinity College and the great ability with which he served it, entitle him to the lasting regard of all its supporters, while his inexhaustible human sympathy and kindness of heart ensure for him the grateful and affectionate remembrance of a host of friends."

== Selected works ==
He was the author of many biographical and theological works (both in the UK and in Canada). Many are held in the British Library. These included:

- Self-knowledge and the four temperaments. a series of sermons preached in Lent. 1865.
- The Anglican Reformation. 1897.
- Antichrist. The First Resurrection. Two Advent sermons. 1865.
- Beveridge, the Scriptural Preacher.
- Character and Work. Hints for younger men and women. 1878.
- Christmas. [A sermon.] 1874.
- The Church and Science. 1872.
- The Comforter. [1875.]
- The Comforter: a series of sermons on certain aspects of the work of the Holy Ghost. 1864.
- Culture. [A sermon.] 1875.
- Four Advent Sermons. 1861.
- Four Sermons preached during Advent, 1860. Second edition, partially rewritten. 1861.
- The Four Temperaments; together with some occasional sermons ... Second edition. 1874.
- Hindrances to the Work of the Church in the World: a series of sermons. [Edited by W. R. Clark.] [1872.]
- The Paraclete. A series of discourses on the person and work of the Holy Spirit ... The Slocum lectures-1899; 1900.
- Pascal and the Port Royalists. 1902.
- The Prodigal Son: a series of sermons. 1860.
- The Redeemer: a series of sermons on certain aspects of the person and work of our Lord Jesus Christ. 1863.
- Righteousness exalteth a Nation. A sermon, etc. 1876.
- Savonarola: his life and times. 1880?.

Professional and academic associations
Preceded by Thomas Keefer	President of the Royal Society of Canada; 1899–1900	Succeeded by Louis-Honoré Fréchette
