= John Castell Hopkins =

Canadian journalist, author, and encyclopedist (1864–1923)

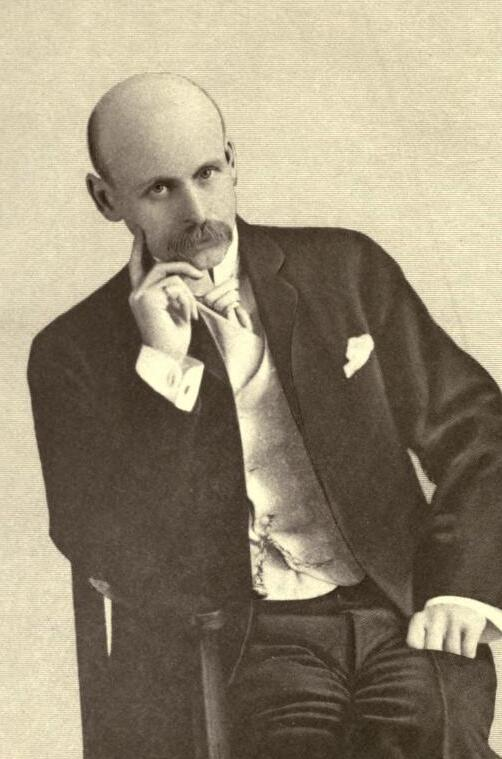
- Hopkins in 1907
- Born: April 1, 1864; Dyersville, Iowa, U.S.
- Died: November 5, 1923 (aged 59); Toronto, Ontario, Canada
- Occupations: Journalist, author, encyclopedist
- Writing career
- Notable works: Canada: An Encyclopædia of the Country; Canadian Annual Review of Public Affairs

John Castell Hopkins (April 1, 1864 – November 5, 1923) was a Canadian journalist, author, and encyclopedist known for his strongly pro-British imperialist views. Over a career spanning three decades, he produced around 40 books and pamphlets on Canadian history and current affairs. Hopkins edited Canada: An Encyclopædia of the Country (1898–1900), the first encyclopaedia of Canada, and was the founding editor of the Canadian Annual Review of Public Affairs from 1901 until his death in 1923.

== Early life and education ==
Hopkins was born in Dyersville, Iowa, to British parents, and moved as a child with his family to Bowmanville, Ontario, where he was educated. In 1883 he began working as a clerk for the Imperial Bank of Canada, first in Bowmanville and from 1889 in Toronto. During the mid-1880s he became active in the Imperial Federation League, helping to found its Ontario branch in Ingersoll in 1886. By 1888 he was an honorary secretary of the League's Dominion branch. Hopkins also sought a literary career, and in 1887 solicited support from intellectual Goldwin Smith, who encouraged him but declined to participate in his projects.

== Journalism ==
In the early 1890s, Hopkins joined the staff of the Toronto Empire, a Conservative daily, where he rose from clerk to associate editor. He resigned in 1894 to work as an independent writer and publicist, shortly before the paper merged with the Mail to form the Mail and Empire. His early writings and pamphlets strongly advocated Imperial Federation and warned against American influence over Canada.

== Imperialist advocacy ==
Hopkins argued that Canada's national development had advanced under British guidance and that the ultimate goal should be an imperial federation in which Canada would be a key member. Like many Canadian imperialists of his era, he was wary of American expansionism and what he viewed as the "democracy and materialism" of the United States. His writings often glorified the United Empire Loyalists and Canadian defenders in the War of 1812.

During the Second Boer War he published South Africa and the Boer-British War (1900), defending Britain's campaign as a fight for liberty. In the First World War, Hopkins depicted the conflict as a struggle between British-led civilization and German authoritarianism, celebrating Canada's wartime contributions, its presence at the Paris Peace Conference of 1919, and participation in the League of Nations.

== Author and editor ==
Between the 1890s and early 1920s, Hopkins wrote or compiled some forty books and pamphlets, in addition to numerous articles in Canada and abroad. He served as general editor of Canada: An Encyclopædia of the Country (6 vols., 1898–1900) and contributed many entries himself, declaring that Canada “requires only to be known in order to be great.” Beginning in 1901 he published the annual Canadian Annual Review of Public Affairs, a compendium of Canadian events and statistics that he edited until his death (with assistance from his wife).

He also authored biographies and histories including Life and Work of Sir John Thompson (1895), Queen Victoria: Her Life and Reign (1896), Progress of Canada in the Nineteenth Century (1900), and The Story of the Dominion (1901).

== Personal life ==
In 1906 Hopkins married Annie Beatrice Mary Bonner, a Roman Catholic, in Toronto. The couple had two daughters. Annie assisted her husband with his work on the Annual Review and continued its publication after his death.

Hopkins was active in the Orange Order and the Sons of England benevolent society, served on the council of the British Empire League in Canada, and was a founder of the Empire Club of Canada, where he served as president in 1910–11. He also belonged to the Albany Club, Rosedale Golf Club, and the Royal Canadian Yacht Club. He was elected a fellow of the Royal Geographical Society, the Royal Statistical Society, and the Royal Society of Literature.

== Legacy ==
Hopkins died in Toronto on November 5, 1923. His widow continued to publish the Annual Review until 1936. The series was later revived in 1960. Though his works were often criticized for their lack of polish and deferential tone, the Canadian Annual Review remains a useful reference for researchers. Hopkins is remembered as one of Canada's most prolific imperialist writers and chroniclers of his time.

== Selected works ==
- Canada and the Empire: A Study of Imperial Federation (1890)
- Canada and American Aggression (1892)
- The Maple Leaf and the Union Jack (1892)
- Life and Work of the Rt. Hon. Sir John Thompson (1895)
- Queen Victoria: Her Life and Reign (1896; rev. 1901)
- South Africa and the Boer-British War (1900)
- Progress of Canada in the Nineteenth Century (1900)
- The Story of the Dominion (1901)
- Canada: An Encyclopædia of the Country (editor, 6 vols., 1898–1900)
- The Origin and History of Empire Day (1910)
- French Canada and the St. Lawrence (1913)
- Canada at War, 1914–1918 (1919)
