= Viscount Weir =

Viscountcy in the Peerage of the United Kingdom

Viscount Weir, of Eastwood in the County of Renfrew, is a title in the Peerage of the United Kingdom. It was created on 25 June 1938 for the Scottish businessman, public servant, politician and former President of the Air Council, William Weir, 1st Baron Weir. He had already been created Baron Weir, of Eastwood in the County of Renfrew, on 26 June 1918, also in the Peerage of the United Kingdom. As of 2010 the titles are held by his grandson, the third Viscount, who succeeded his father in 1975.

The family previously owned Montgreenan Estate, near Torranyard, Ayrshire.

== Viscounts Weir (1938) ==
- William Douglas Weir, 1st Viscount Weir (1877–1959)
- James Kenneth Weir, 2nd Viscount Weir FRSE (1905–1975)
- William Kenneth James Weir, 3rd Viscount Weir (b. 1933)

The heir apparent is the present holder's son, the Hon. James William Hartland Weir (b. 1965)

== Arms ==
Coat of arms of Viscount Weir
Coronet A Coronet of a Viscount Crest A Wing Argent charge with a Thistle slipped proper Escutcheon Azure a Cogwheel Or winged Argent in chief the Sun in Splendour of the second Supporters On either side a Winged Horse Argent hoofed and crined Or Motto Forward Towards The Light
