= Kieffer =

Kieffer is a surname. Notable people with the surname include:

- Aldine Silliman Kieffer (1840–1904), American music writer
- André Kieffer (1903-1984), French politician in Chad
- Charles Kieffer (1910–75), American athlete
- Eduardo Gudiño Kieffer (1935–2002), Argentine writer
- Guy-André Kieffer (born 1949), French-Canadian journalist
- John Kieffer, American information theorist
- Josef Kieffer (1900–1947), German Nazi executed for war crimes
- Jean-Jacques Kieffer (1857–1925), French entomologist
- Leo Kieffer (1930–2017), American politician and businessman
- Oliver Kieffer (born 1979), French volleyball player
- Philippe Kieffer (1899–1962), French naval officer
- Robert Kieffer (born 1946), Canadian politician
- Susan Kieffer (born 1942), American geologist

== See also ==
- Kiefer
