= List of listed buildings in Daviot, Aberdeenshire =

This is a list of listed buildings in the parish of Daviot in Aberdeenshire, Scotland.

== List ==
Name	Location	Date listed	Grid ref. (Note: Sometimes known as OSGB36, the grid reference (where provided) is based on the British national grid reference system used by the Ordnance Survey. • "Guide to National Grid". Ordnance Survey. • "Get-a-map". Ordnance Survey.)	Geo-coordinates	Notes	LB number (Note: Historic Environment Scotland assign a unique alphanumeric identifier to each designated site in Scotland, for listed buildings this always begins with "LB", for example "LB12345".)	Image
Old House Of Glack Gatepiers To N.W				57°20′45″N 2°25′50″W	Category C(S)	2791	Upload Photo
Old House Of Glack, House Of Daviot Hospital				57°20′44″N 2°25′48″W	Category B	2790	Upload Photo
Mounie Castle, Symbol Stone				57°20′52″N 2°23′22″W	Category B	33	Upload Photo
Mounie Castle, Detached Block At N.E				57°20′53″N 2°23′22″W	Category B	2794	Upload Photo
Mounie Castle, Garden House				57°20′53″N 2°23′26″W	Category B	2795	Upload Photo
Fingask House Gates				57°20′03″N 2°22′03″W	Category B	2799	Upload Photo
Parish Church Of Daviot, Churchyard				57°20′39″N 2°25′03″W	Category C(S)	2789	Upload Photo
Mounie Castle, Gatepiers Gates And Flanking Walls				57°20′48″N 2°23′02″W	Category B	2796	Upload Photo
Parish Church Of Daviot (St Colm)				57°20′39″N 2°25′04″W	Category C(S)	2788	Upload Photo
House Of Daviot Formerly New House Of Glack				57°20′41″N 2°25′47″W	Category B	2792	Upload Photo
Fingask House Walled Garden				57°20′00″N 2°22′00″W	Category C(S)	2798	Upload Photo
Mounie Castle, Original Block				57°20′53″N 2°23′22″W	Category A	2793	Upload Photo
Fingask House				57°20′01″N 2°21′55″W	Category B	2797	Upload Photo

== Key ==
The scheme for classifying buildings in Scotland is:

- Category A: "buildings of national or international importance, either architectural or historic; or fine, little-altered examples of some particular period, style or building type."
- Category B: "buildings of regional or more than local importance; or major examples of some particular period, style or building type, which may have been altered."
- Category C: "buildings of local importance; lesser examples of any period, style, or building type, as originally constructed or moderately altered; and simple traditional buildings which group well with other listed buildings."

In March 2016 there were 47,288 listed buildings in Scotland. Of these, 8% were Category A, and 50% were Category B, with the remaining 42% being Category C.

== See also ==
- List of listed buildings in Aberdeenshire
