= Keefers =

- Location of Keefers in British Columbia
- Coordinates: 50°00′59″N 121°32′04″W
- Country: Canada
- Province: British Columbia
- Region: Fraser Canyon
- Regional District: Fraser Valley
- Area codes: 250, 778, 236, & 672

Keefers is a railway point in the lower Fraser Canyon area of southwestern British Columbia. The ghost town is on the west shore of the Fraser River and north of the mouth of the Nahatlatch River. The locality is by rail about 82 kilometres (50.8 mi) north of Hope and 26 kilometres (15.9 mi) south of Lytton.

== Name origin ==
George Alexander Keefer (1836–1912), surveyor and construction engineer, had charge of building the Canadian Pacific Railway (CP) between North Bend and Lytton. During this period, he resided with his wife and children at his headquarters, namely the future Keefers.

== Mining ==
In 1858, during the Fraser Canyon Gold Rush, placer miners worked the river bars. Being forewarned that hostile First Nations intended to exterminate them, a party of 20 miners were retreating down the Fraser, when they came under attack at Mariners' Bar, just upstream from later Keefers. Five survivors, some seriously wounded, were able to escape. From that time, the location was known as Slaughter Flat.

The goldrush also drew thousands of Chinese to the Fraser Canyon, who then remained in the area. In the early 1880s, many were involved in building the CP, having accommodation at Keefers more permanent than found in the temporary camps. This Chinese village remained a notable feature well after construction was completed.

In the late 1890s, larger scale hydraulic mining took place in the vicinity. Over the following decades, small groups of prospectors worked the gravel bars and smaller scale mining continued in the surrounding hills.

== Railways ==
In August 1883, the northward advance of the CP rail head from Yale passed through Keefers toward a temporary terminus at the Cisco Bridge.

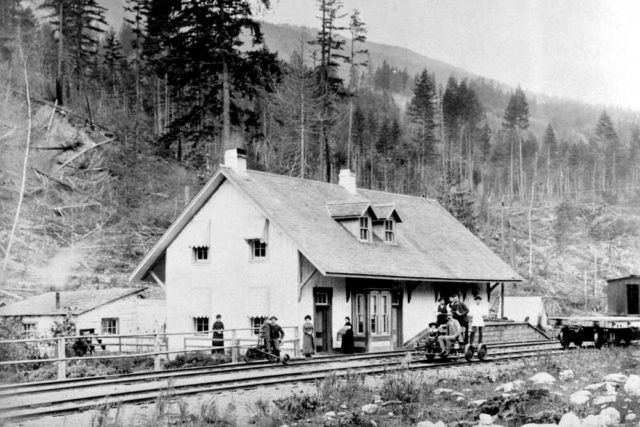
Train Station, Keefers, 1885

A few miles north of Keefers during construction, a contractor's locomotive struck a rockslide, derailed, fell, and slid down toward the river, but neither the crew were injured nor the locomotive damaged. After CP construction ended, the Skuzzy was berthed at Keefers until its machinery was removed in 1884.

In 1885, about 5 kilometres (3 mi) north, a locomotive derailed at the edge of a steep drop.

In 1888, a train struck a nightwatchman, crushing his hands and splintering his forearm.

In 1892, a passing train struck a plank on the station platform, which inflicted a fatal blow upon a carpenter at work.

During the erection of a large stone arch a few miles to the south in 1895, the mast of a derrick broke and fell, fatally injuring a member of the masonry crew.

Train Timetables (Regular stop or Flag stop)
	Mile	1887	1891	1898	1905	1909	1912	1916	1919	1929	1932	1935	1939	1943	1948	1954	1960	1964	1965
Gladwin	90.1					Flag	Flag	Flag	Flag	Flag	Flag	Flag	Flag	Flag	Flag	Flag			
Lytton	94.9	Regular	Regular	Regular	Regular	Regular	Regular	Both	Regular	Regular	Regular	Regular	Regular	Regular	Both	Both	Regular	Regular	Both
Cisco	99.6	Flag	Regular	Flag										Flag					
Kanaka	103.9						Flag	Flag	Flag	Flag	Flag	Flag	Flag	Flag	Flag	Flag			
Keefers	110.8	Regular	Regular	Regular	Regular	Flag	Flag	Flag	Flag	Flag	Both	Flag	Flag	Flag	Flag	Flag	Flag	Flag	
Chaumox	116.5					Flag	Flag	Flag	Flag	Flag	Flag	Flag	Flag	Flag	Flag	Flag			
North Bend	121.5	Regular	Regular	Regular	Regular	Regular	Regular	Regular	Regular	Regular	Regular	Regular	Regular	Regular	Regular	Regular	Regular	Regular	Regular
China Bar	6.1						Flag	Flag	Flag	Flag		Flag	Flag	Flag	Flag	Flag	Flag	Flag	
Spuzzum	15.5	Regular	Flag	Flag	Regular	Flag	Flag	Flag	Flag	Flag	Flag	Flag	Flag	Flag	Flag	Both	Flag	Flag	

In 1903, the engineer of an eastbound passenger train braked on sighting a massive washout ahead. The crew jumped to safety at the last moment before the locomotive and tender rolled 122 metres (400 ft) down an embankment to the river edge.

In 1907, a freight train struck a boulder and derailed, but the crew escaped serious injury.

On watching a landslide destroy the track in 1911, a watchman mounted his speeder, rushed toward an oncoming passenger train, signalled it to halt, threw his speeder from the track, and saved the passing locomotive from reaching the slide area.

In 1912, during the construction of the Canadian Northern Railway (CNoR) on the east side of the river, a massive landslide destroyed a tunnel.

In November 1913, the eastward advance of the CNoR rail head almost reached the shore opposite Keefers. Inkitsaph was the station at that location.

In 1916, passengers desperate for food on a snowbound CNoR train, walked across the frozen river to the small Keefer general store.

While a westbound freight train was winding around the high rocky cliffs near Keefers in 1929, a bullet crashed through the caboose window.

During the 1939 royal tour of Canada, the westbound royal train stayed overnight at Keefers. The lack of any road access would have enhanced security, and the trackside garden was picturesque.

In 1953, a truck driver died when a locomotive struck his truck.

In 1956, when a freighthopper fell, the freight car wheels severed his head, legs, and arms.

Built in 1884, the standard-design (Bohi's Type 5) single-storey station building with gable roof and dormers was destroyed in 1964. The passing track is 2,434 metres (7,986 ft) in length.

In 2007, a Canadian National Railway (CN) locomotive derailed on striking a landslide near Inkitsaph.

== General community ==
G.A. Libby provided meals for travellers from the mid-1880s and also accommodation by 1890. In addition, he ran a general store by that time.

Taking over from Libby, who had become section foreman, James Hannah provided meals and accommodation from 1895. Hannah was the inaugural postmaster 1895–1914.

When the school opened in 1899, Miss S. McAlpine was the inaugural teacher.

The short-lived community had a population of 126 in 1900. Hannah may have been selective in the guests offered accommodation.

By the late 1910s, the local economy was mining, ranching and orchards. A small cemetery existed. The general store was well stocked, but the population had shrunk to about 25.

The Hannah family remained as postmasters until 1953. That year, a portable replaced the former one-room school building and a teacherage was erected. The school closed in 1958. The post office closed in 1965, and the store assumedly closed around that time.

== Ferry and road ==
At least during the 1890s, First Nations provided an informal canoe service which connected with the road on the east shore.

Around 1960, a forest service road was built beyond Chaumox to provide vehicle access.

== Map ==
- "Department of Lands and Forests Map". searcharchives.vancouver.ca. 1956.

== See also ==
- Keefer (disambiguation)
