= Daviot, Aberdeenshire =

Coordinates: 57°20′N 2°25′W

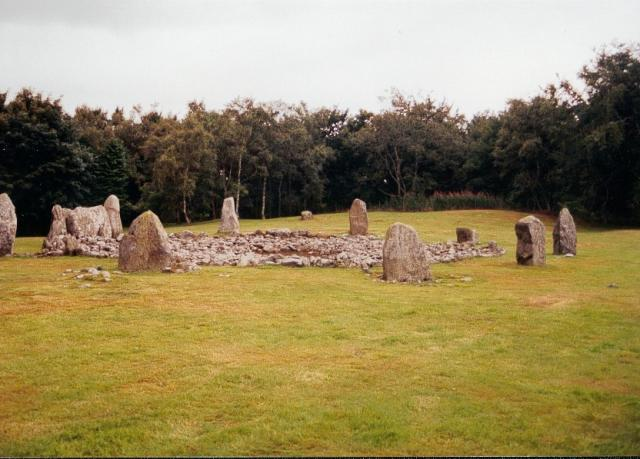
The prehistoric stone circle at Loanhead of Daviot

Daviot (Scottish Gaelic: Deimhidh) is a village in Aberdeenshire, Scotland, located about 4 miles (6.4 km) from Inverurie. It is the birthplace of the theologian William Robinson Clark.

Daviot is home to the Loanhead of Daviot stone circle, a Neolithic recumbent stone circle comprising ten standing stones and one recumbent stone. Other features in and around the village include the House of Daviot, a former residential care home, a Schlumberger explosives facility on a nearby hill, and the site of Scotland's first genetically modified crop field.

The village has a pub, the Smiddy Bar.

== See also ==
- List of listed buildings in Daviot, Aberdeenshire
- Mounie Castle
