= Hamilton Waterworks =

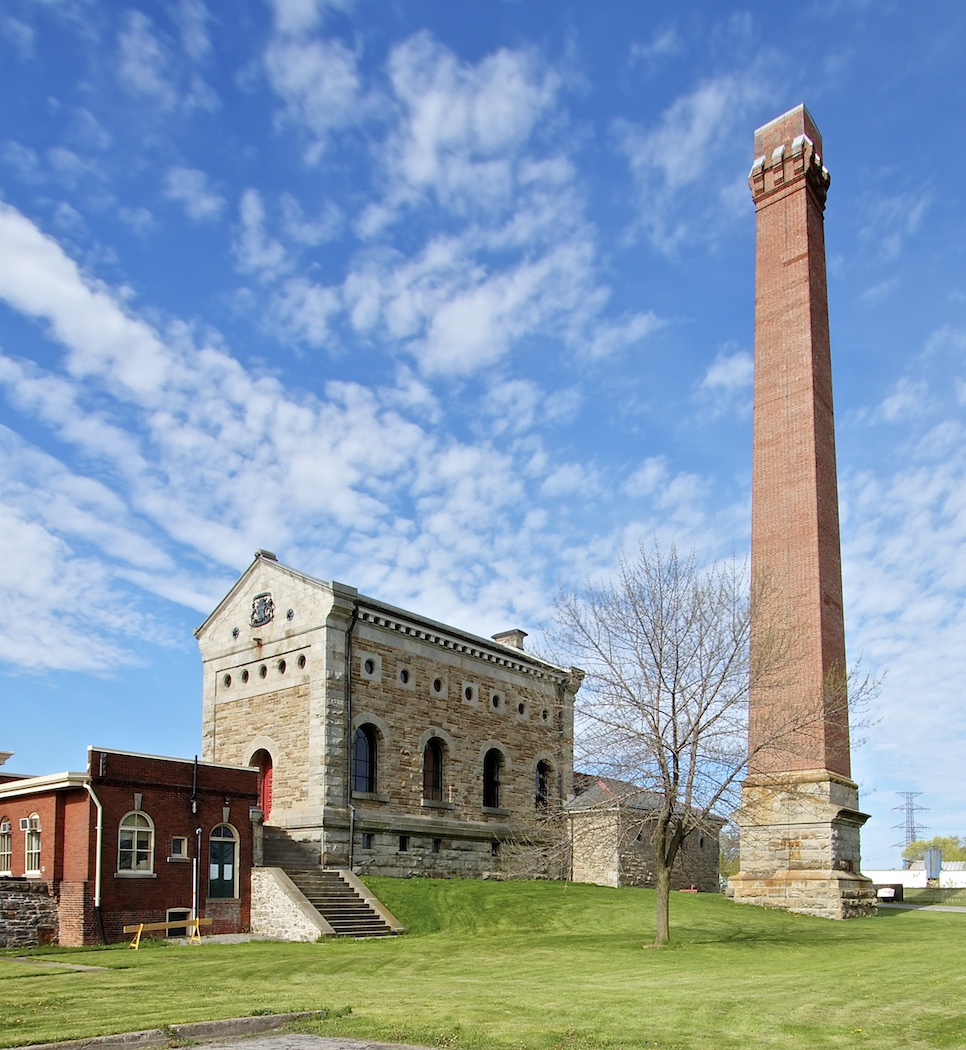
- Interactive map of the Hamilton Waterworks area

General information
- Architectural style: Victorian
- Location: Hamilton, Ontario, Canada
- Coordinates: 43°15′22.45″N 79°46′14.51″W
- Opened: 1859

Design and construction
- Main contractor: George Worthington

National Historic Site of Canada
- Official name: Hamilton Waterworks National Historic Site of Canada
- Designated: 17 November 1977

The Hamilton Waterworks, also known as the Hamilton Waterworks Pumping Station, is a National Historic Site of Canada located in Hamilton, Ontario. It is an industrial water works structure built in the Victorian style, and a rare example of such a structure in Canada to be "architecturally and functionally largely intact". It is currently used to house the Museum of Steam and Technology.

Its construction began in 1856, with the work contracted to local stonemason George Worthington, and was completed by 1859. It was opened on 18 September 1860 by Edward VII, at the time the Prince of Wales, during a two-month royal tour to Canada. It was formally designated a heritage site on 17 November 1977, and listed as a National Historic Site of Canada on 12 June 2007.

== Background ==
In 1833, Hamilton's water system consisted of five wells. A December 1853 report to city standing committee on fire and water, prepared by William Hodgins, proposed a public water system using Ancaster Creek as a source to avoid using pumps or sourcing water from the potentially contaminated Burlington Bay. The committee dismissed the proposal, and in September 1854 announced a public competition to design a public water system suitable for 40,000 inhabitants, about four times the population of the city. A prize of £100 was offered. This was prompted by a cholera epidemic in the city, which killed 552 people in the summer of 1854.

Thomas Keefer was hired to review the submissions, and on 23 December 1854 announced that American engineer Samuel McElroy was the winning candidate. His design included a pumping station at Burlington Heights, and a reservoir near the intersection of York Street and Dundurn Street. Council opted not to build this station, partly encouraged by Keefer whose reports recorded "peculiar" characteristics of the water from Burlington Bay. In January 1857, Hamilton City Council chose Keefer to be chief engineer to build a public water system drawing water from Lake Ontario.

A fountain was installed at Gore Park to remind the city's residents of the pure water that had become available to them.

== Description ==
The complex is located adjacent to Globe Park, with Queen Elizabeth Way to the east and Woodward Avenue to the west. There are several components to the site. The pump house used steam pressure to pump water 3 kilometres (1.9 mi) from Lake Ontario to a reservoir above the Niagara Escarpment, the boiler house generated the steam, the chimney exhausted the smoke, and the woodshed stored the fuel, initially wood and later coal. The water was distributed to the city's buildings through pipes by gravity.

The interior of the Italianate pump house building retains its original machinery, floors, and balustrades. Two Woolf Compound Engines were originally installed, each one a condensing rotative beam engine producing 100 hp built in Dundas. A massive stone structure was built around each 90-ton, 14-metre (46 ft) engine for support. One of these steam engines still operates, now powered by an electric motor.

The 150-foot (46 m) chimney is built of brick atop a large stone base consisting of two types of stone. Both the yellow-brown bioturbated Eramosa dolomite and the grey Whirlpool cross-bedding and laminated sandstone were quarried at Stoney Creek.

== National Historic Site of Canada ==
On 17 November 1977, the Hamilton Waterworks was officially recognized as a National Historic Site of Canada. In addition to the original pumping station, the site also includes the boilerhouse, chimney, and shed, all of which were built in 1859, a second shed built by Worthington in 1910 with a steam pump, a pumphouse built in 1913, a carpenter shed built in 1915, and valves and valve chambers installed throughout the 1900s.

== Legacy ==
The building's exterior has been featured in the television show Murdoch Mysteries as the setting for the Toronto morgue.
