= Charles Keefer =

Canadian engineer

Charles Henry Keefer (1852 – 12 April 1932) was one of Canada's pioneering engineers.

Charles was the son of well-known Canadian civil engineer, Thomas Keefer. Charles was born in Rideau Hall in Ottawa when it was the property of his grandfather, Thomas McKay, before it became the official residence of the Governor General of Canada. Although not formally educated, Keefer spent his early years employed as a surveyor on some of Canada's most important railway works including the Canada Central Railway (Ottawa to Carleton Place), the Chaudière branch of the St. Lawrence and Ottawa Railway, the Canadian Pacific Railway (Yellowhead Pass), and the Canada Atlantic Railway.

Between 1872 and 1875, he worked on the construction of the Ottawa Water Works as assistant engineer. He worked on Montreal Harbour Works in 1878 and between 1881 and 1885 he was division engineer during the construction of the New York, Lake Erie and Western Railway extensions. In 1884-1885, he worked on the Kicking Horse Pass section of the C.P.R. and later became an engineer for the construction of the Tay Canal. He joined the Canadian Society of Civil Engineers (CSCE) in 1887 and was an active participant in discussing engineering matters through the journal of the Engineering Institute of Canada. He was elected as a "Member of Council" of (CSCE) in 1892, 1893, and 1903, and became vice-president of that society in 1904-1905. In 1914, he was elected to the board of directors of the American Society of Civil Engineers (ASCE). Keefer's official biographer is historian Daniel Hambly.

In 1902, his daughter Mabel Crichton Keefer married James Fuidge Crowdy, who would later become Assistant Secretary to the Governor General of Canada. His granddaughter married James Kenneth Weir, 2nd Viscount Weir of Eastwood.
