= Roland Kuhn =

Swiss psychiatrist

Roland Kuhn (4 March 1912 – 10 October 2005) was a Swiss psychiatrist who discovered that the drug imipramine had antidepressant properties. he was born in Biel and died in Scherzingen. In 1957, Kuhn published the results of his observations of the antidepressant properties of Imipramine in the Schweizerische Medizinische Wochenschrift (Swiss Weekly Medical Journal). More recently, it was discovered that he tested drugs on patients and children without informed consent and without proper approval by the authorities during his time at the psychiatric hospital in Münsterlingen (where he was director 1971–1980), a practice that is highly unethical.

Kuhn studied medicine in Basel, and moved into psychiatry as a second choice of specialty. He trained under Jakob Klaesi, the inventor of sleep therapy.

== Personal life ==
He was married to Verena Gebhart. They had three daughters, Regula, Beatrix, and Ursula.

== Honours ==
Doctor of Medicine in Honoris causa from Université catholique de Louvain and University of Basel

Doctor of Philosophy in honoris causa from Sorbonne University

== Bibliography ==
Marietta Meier, Magaly Tornay, et Marie König, On trial: Testing new drugs in psychiatry, 1940-1980, Manchester, Manchester University Press, 2024.
