= Empire Club of Canada =

Canadian speakers forum

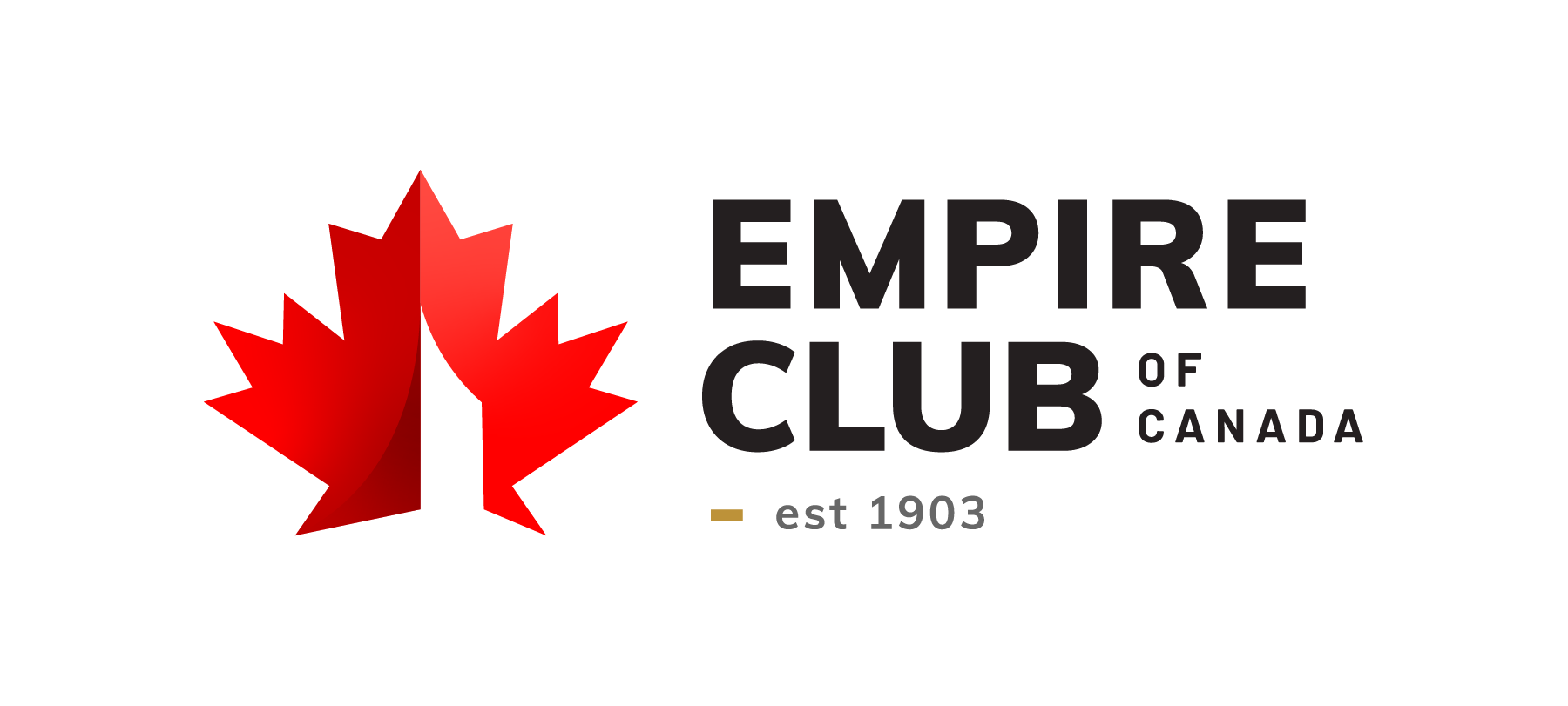
The Empire Club of Canada logo

The Empire Club of Canada is a Canadian speakers' forum. Established in 1903, the Empire Club has provided a forum for many thousands of different speakers.

Through a variety of presentation formats, the Empire Club invites local, national and international leaders and other change-agents to address the topical, relevant issues of the day. The club is based in Toronto, Ontario, with luncheon-style meetings held at several different downtown hotel and meeting spaces. It pivoted to virtual meetings as a result of health and safety concerns during the COVID-19 pandemic in 2020.

== History ==
The Empire Club of Canada was established in 1903 as a result of a political discussion which created considerable unrest in Canada. Growing dissent against the British was influencing Toronto's political and social landscape. In an attempt to refrain from a severing of ties with the British Empire, a group of men under the leadership of Brig.-Gen. James Mason discussed the creation of an organization that would promote public discourse and discussion about key issues of the day, both at home and abroad.

With this mandate in mind, the group gathered to draft the constitution for a new club to be named The Empire Club of Canada. Canada's "Imperial bond" with Britain was the cornerstone of the Empire Club of Canada, as its founders believed it would be beneficial to Canada to maintain strong political and economic ties with the Empire. This organization, with a plan of weekly luncheons, which would be addressed by prominent individuals who spoke with authority on the issues of the day, would also have the distinctive basis of the British connection in its work and policy. Membership was restricted to British subjects—there was no legal Canadian citizenship at the time—who would pay dues of one dollar a year, with a maximum membership of 500. Within a month, membership exceeded 300. A year or two later, the club had a waiting list of those wishing to join.

The first luncheon speaker on December 3, 1903, was a clergyman and professor, William Clark, who said: "I can quite understand that to many persons, the formation of a club of this kind will seem a very little thing, ... I have not the least doubt that this Club will become of great influence and power in this Dominion". Clark's address became the first of many, with the Empire Club's podium hosting countless great leaders of politics, business, social issues and arts & culture.

Since its inaugural meeting in December 1903, the Empire Club of Canada has provided a forum to discuss ongoing issues of local, national and international importance. More than 3,500 addresses have been delivered from the Empire Club podium, and every address is kept on record in the Empire Club of Canada's annual Red Book.

== Notable speakers ==
Some highly notable speakers who have addressed the Empire Club podium have included:

- Indira Gandhi
- Brian Mulroney
- The Dalai Lama
- Margaret Thatcher
- Bill Gates
- Audrey Hepburn
- John Diefenbaker
- Ronald Reagan
- Margaret Mead
- Prince Philip
- Winston Churchill
- Billy Graham
- Chrystia Freeland
- Pierre Trudeau
- Grey Owl
- Henry N.R. Jackman
- Jean Chrétien
- Hilary Weston
- Maureen Forrester
- Roberta Bondar
- Adrienne Clarkson
- Paul Martin
- Stephen Harper
- Michael Ignatieff
- Mark Carney
- Christopher Plummer
- Gordon Pinsent
- Beverley McLachlin
- Kyle Dubas
- Bobby Webster

== The Empire Club Foundation ==
The Empire Club Foundation was incorporated in January 1969 and serves as a vehicle for the publication and wide-distribution of the Club's speeches. Copies are sent to a large distribution of schools, libraries, consulates and embassies.

Registered as a charity, its objectives are to promote the interest in current and public affairs, and to establish a historical database of all Empire Club speeches. All of the Empire Club speeches since 1903 are available via the Empire Club's website. In 2021, Dr. Gordon McIvor, Past President of the Empire Club of Canada, was appointed as the Chair of the Empire Club Foundation (gordonmcivor.ca).

== List of club presidents ==
The following people have served as president of the Empire Club:

Year	President	Year	President
1903–1904	The Rt. Hon. Lord Strathcona	1904–1905	The Rt. Rev. William Clark
1905–1906	Mr. William Briggs	1906-1907	Mr. J. P. Murray
1907–1908	Mr. J.F.M. Stewart	1908–1909	Mr. D.J. Coggin
1909–1910	Mr. Elias Clouse		
1910–1911	John Castell Hopkins	1911–1912	F.B. Fetherstonhaugh
1912–1913	The Rt. Rev. James F. Sweeny	1913–1914	The Hon. Mr. Justice James Craig
1914–1915	Lt. Col. R.J. Stuart	1915–1916	Albert Ham
1916–1917	James Black Perry	1917–1918	Norman Sommerville
1918–1919	F.J. Coombs	1919–1920	R.A. Stapells
1920–1921	Arthur Hewitt	1921–1922	Brig. Gen. C.H. Mitchell
1922–1923	Sir William Hearst	1923–1924	Elias H. Wilkinson
1924–1925	William Brooks	1925–1926	Rev. N.R. Burns
1926–1927	Col. A.E. Kirkpatrick	1927–1928	Col. Alexander Fraser
1928–1929	Robert H. Fennell	1929–1930	Hugh S. Eayrs
1930–1931	John D.M. Spence	1931–1932	H.G. Stapells
1932–1933	Col. The Hon. George A. Drew		
1933–1934	Major James Baxter	1934–1935	The Hon. Mr. Justice Dana H. Porter
1935–1936	J.H. Brace	1936–1937	Major G.B. Balfour
1937–1938	Major R.M. Harcourt	1938–1939	J.P. Pratt
1939–1940	F.A. Gaby	1940–1941	The Hon. G. Howard Ferguson
1941–1942	C.R. Sanderson	1942–1943	John C.M. MacBeth
1943–1944	W. Eason Humphreys	1944–1945	Charles R. Conquergood
1945–1946	Eric F. Thompson	1946–1947	Major F.L. Clouse
1947–1948	Tracey E. Lloyd	1948–1949	T.H. Howse
1949–1950	H.C. Colebrook	1950–1951	Sydney Hermant
1951–1952	D.H. Gibson	1952–1953	John W.F. Griffin
1953–1954	Arthur E.M. Inwood	1954–1955	James H. Joyce
1955–1956	C.C. Goldring	1956–1957	Donald H. Jupp
1957–1958	LCol. W.H. Montague	1958–1959	MGen. B.J. Legge
1959–1960	Harold R. Lawson	1960–1961	Hon. Alexander Stark
1961–1962	Dr. Z.S. Phimister	1962–1963	Dr. J. Palmer Kent
1963–1964	Major Arthur J. Langley	1964–1965	Col. Robert H. Hilborn
1965–1966	Col. E.A. Royce	1966–1967	R. Bredin Stapells
1967–1968	B. Graham M. Gore	1968–1969	Edward B. Jolliffe
1969–1970	H. Ian Macdonald	1970–1971	H.V. Cranfield
1971–1972	The Hon. Henry N.R. Jackman	1972–1973	Maj. The Hon. Mr. Justice Joseph H. Potts
1973–1974	Robert L. Armstrong	1974–1975	Sir Arthur Chetwynd
1975–1976	H. Allan Leal	1976–1977	William M. Karn
1977–1978	Peter Hermant	1978–1979	MGen. Reginald W. Lewis
1979–1980	John A. MacNaughton	1980–1981	Reginald Stackhouse
1981–1982	BGen. S.F. Andrunyk	1982–1983	Henry J. Stalder
1983–1984	Douglas L. Derry	1984–1985	Catherine R. Charlton
1985–1986	Harry T. Seymour	1986–1987	Nona Macdonald
1987–1988	Ronald Goodall	1988–1989	A.A. (Tony) van Straubenzee
1989–1990	Sarah A. Band	1990–1991	Maj. The Rev. Canon Harold F. Roberts
1992–1993	Robert L. Brooks	1993–1994	Col. Frederic L.R. Jackman
1994–1995	John A. Campion	1995–1996	David A. Edmison
1996–1997	Julie K. Hannaford	1997–1998	Gareth S. Seltzer
1998–1999	George L. Cooke	1999–2000	Robert J. Dechert
2000–2001	Catherine Steele	2001–2002	Bill Laidlaw
2002–2003	Ann Curran	2003–2004	John Koopman
2004–2005	Bart J. Mindszenthy	2005–2006	William G. Whittaker
2006–2007	Capt. The Rev. Dr. John S. Niles MSM	2007–2008	Catherine S. Swift
2008–2009	Jo-Ann McArthur	2009–2010	Alfred Apps
2010–2011	Tim Reid	2011–2012	Verity Sylvester
2012–2013	Robin Sears	2013–2014	Noble Chummar
2014–2015	Andrea Wood	2015–2016	Gordon McIvor
2016–2017	Paul Fogolin	2017–2018	Barbara Jesson
2018–2019	Kent Emerson	2019–2020	Mike Van Soelen
2020–2021	Antoinette Tummillo	2021–2022	Kelly Jackson
2022-2024	Sal Rabbani	2024-2025	Jenna Donelson
