= Weir plc =

Scottish multinational engineering company headquartered in Glasgow, Scotland

Weir PLC
- Type: Public
- Traded as: LSE: WEIR; FTSE 100 component
- Industry: Engineering
- Founded: 1871
- Headquarters: Glasgow, Scotland, UK
- Key people: Barbara Jeremiah, (Chairman); Andrew Neilson, (CEO)
- Revenue: ▲£2,564.5 million (2025)
- Operating income: ▲£517.6 million (2025)
- Net income: ▼£247.6 million (2025)
- Number of employees: 12,000 (2026)
- Website: www.global.weir

Weir plc is a Scottish multinational engineering company headquartered in Glasgow, Scotland. It is listed on the London Stock Exchange and is a constituent of the FTSE 100 Index.

== History ==
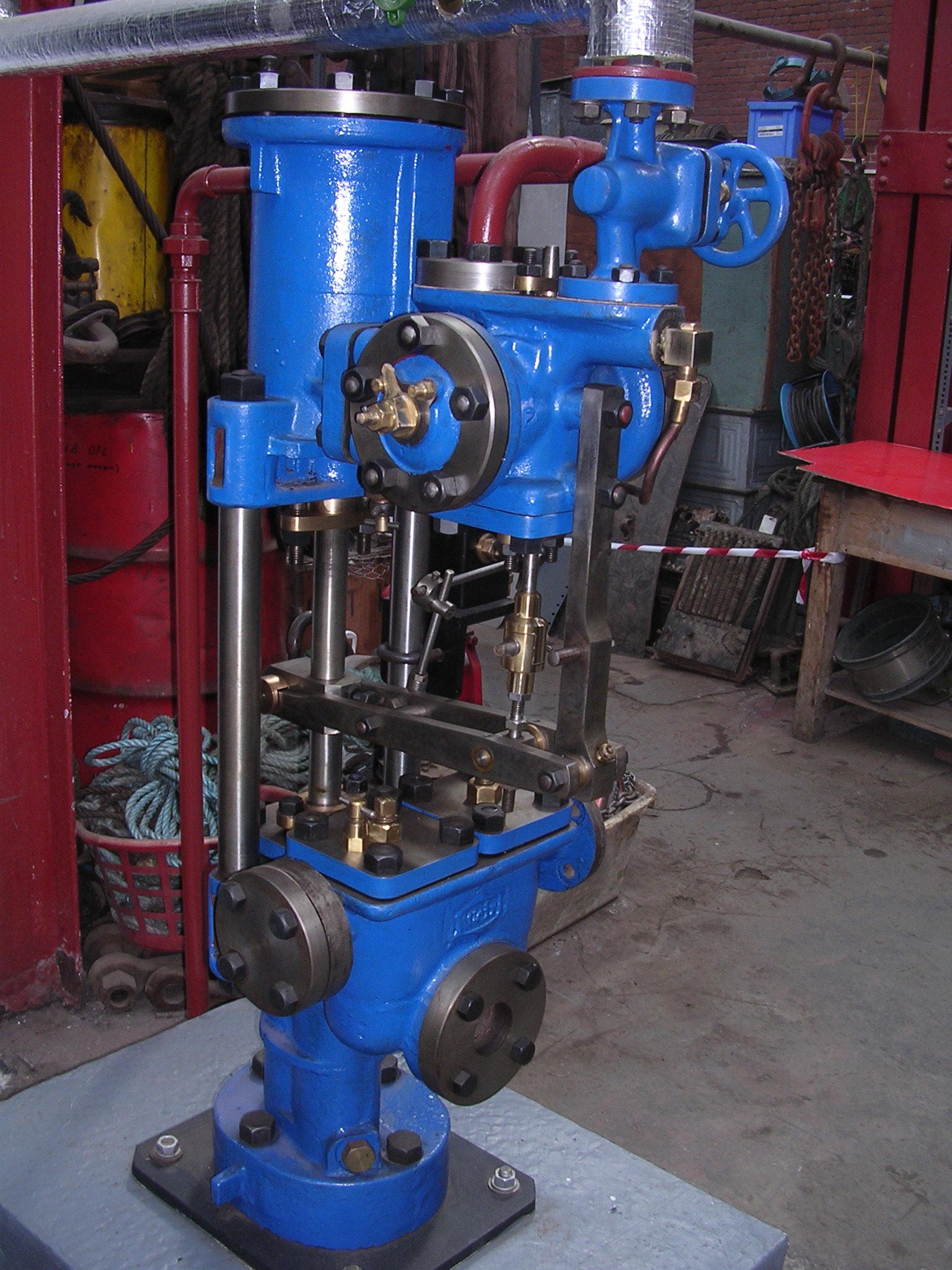
Weir boiler feedwater pump

The company was established in 1871 as an engineering firm by two brothers, George and James Weir, founding G. & J. Weir Ltd. The Weir brothers produced numerous groundbreaking inventions in pumping equipment, primarily for the Clyde shipyards and the steam ships built there. These pumps became extremely well known for their use as boiler feedwater pumps, and for ship's auxiliary equipment such as evaporators.

During 1886, the company established a new machine shop in Cathcart alongside a recently extended railway line. Under the leadership of W D Weir, the company turned to producing munitions and war materiel during the First World War. In addition to shells, it manufactured aero-engines and whole aircraft, including the Royal Aircraft Factory F.E.2 fighter and bomber. By the end of the conflict, in excess of 1,100 aircraft had been completed by the firm.

In 1930 the company acquired Contraflo Condenser & Kinetic Air Pump Co, Westminster, in 1933 A. G. Mumford, Colchester, in 1958 Catton & Co (merged into Weir-Catton) and in 1960 the pump section of Alley & MacLellan, Polmadie.

During the interwar period, James George Weir (aviator, son of James Galloway Weir) a director of the company formed the Cierva Autogiro Company. G & J Weir would be a financial supporter of the company during its existence. In 1943, the firm provided the finances for the construction of the W.9, an experimental helicopter, to Air Ministry requirements.

The company was first listed on the London Stock Exchange in 1946. By this time, double-acting Weir steam pumps had become virtually standard fitment on British-built steamships, being used for pumping water, fuel, air and numerous other materials, as well as being widely used on numerous foreign-built ships, well into the 1950s.

In December 1968, Weir Group issued an offer to purchase the rival British pump manufacturer Worthington-Simpson, following an offer by Studebaker-Worthington. During 1969, Studebaker-Worthington acquired Worthington-Simpson. After some negotiation, Weir's acquired 50% of Worthington Simpson. A new joint-venture company named Worthington Weir was set up to handle international sales of the two parent companies. The debt taken on by Weir to acquire their share of Worthington-Simpson was denominated in Deutsche Marks, and as that currency strengthened against both the Sterling and the Dollar, it became increasingly expensive to service. While Worthington-Simpson was a profitable venture, it did not cover the cost of this debt.

In response to the company's debt burden, Weir Group was compelled to sell off numerous assets and undertook financial reorganization in 1981. Following this reorganization, Derald Ruttenberg and Jacob Rothschild gained effective control of 40% of the company; Ruttenberg became a board member. Amid the reorganization, the 3rd Viscount Weir, who had been chairman since 1972, stepped down to vice chairman. However, Lord Weir regained the chairmanship in 1983 and served in this role until 1999.

During 1989, the company acquired Hopkinsons, an Huddersfield-based company manufacturing valves and controls.

=== 21st century ===
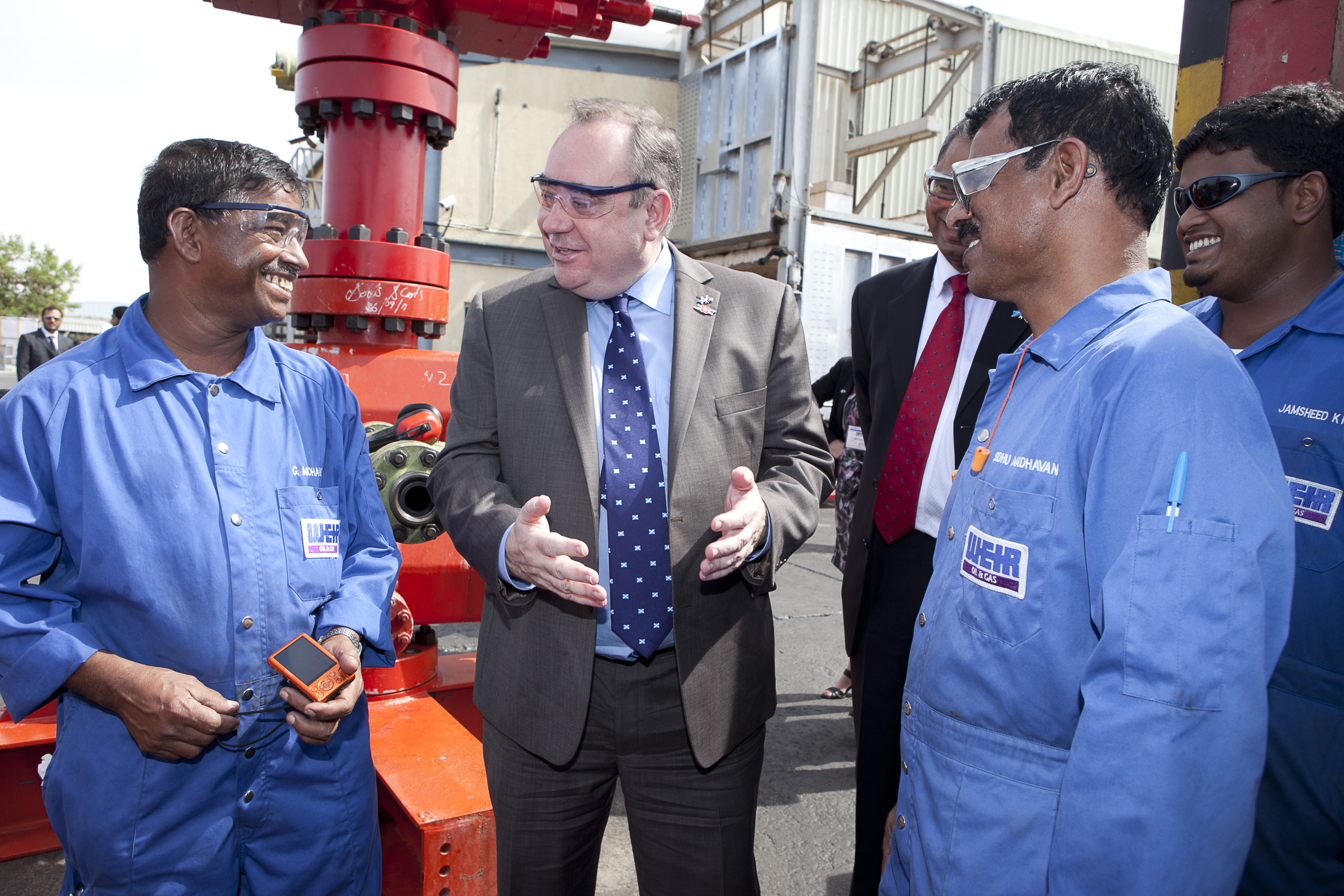
First Minister of Scotland Alex Salmond visiting a Weir facility in Dubai in 2011

During July 2005, Weir sold its desalination and water treatment businesses, (Weir Westgarth, Weir Entropie and Weir Envig) to Veolia Water Systems, part of the water division of Veolia Environnement: Weir Westgarth had been a pioneer of the multi-stage flash distillation process used predominantly to produce desalinated water from seawater. During May 2007, the company sold its Glasgow-based business Weir Pumps to Jim McColl's Clyde Blowers plc, with the pump company subsequently being renamed to Clyde Pumps Ltd.

In early 2006, it was reported that, amid allegations that the company had paid a multi-million pound bribe to Saddam Hussein's Iraq, Weir Group acknowledged that it had parted company with several employees over the claims. In December 2010, Weir Group pleaded guilty to breaching UN sanctions imposed on Iraq between 2000 and 2002. Judge Lord Carloway of The High Court in Edinburgh fined the company £3m along with a confiscation order of £13.9m. Following this judgement, the company continued to operate in Iraq.

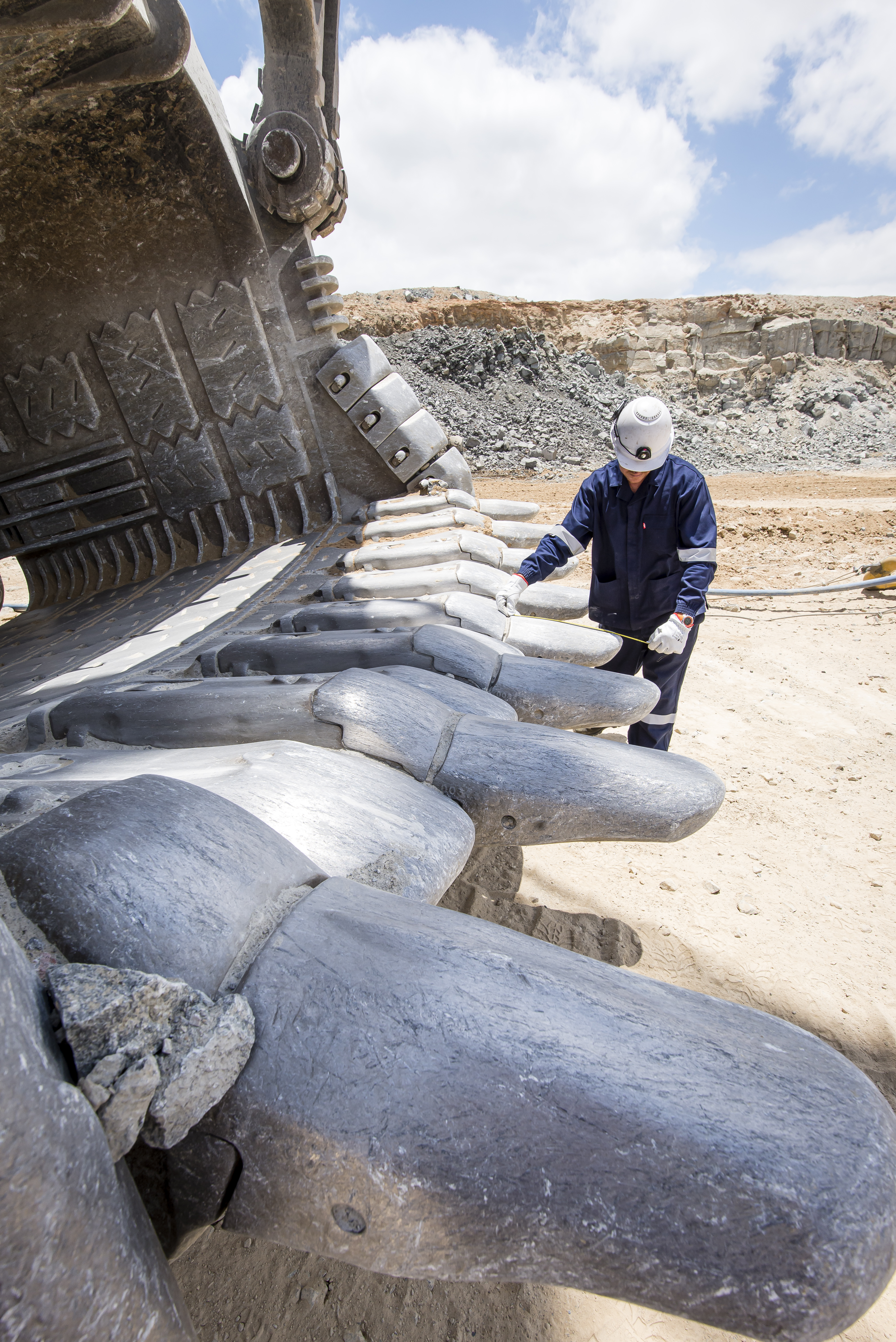
ESCO digging tooth system

In 2010, Weir Group formed an agreement with the Japanese conglomerate Mitsubishi Heavy Industries to cooperate on pump-related work on new nuclear power stations.

During August 2011, the company announced record profits of £178 million, having risen during the first six months of the year by 24%; orders were also up substantially. One year later, the firm was involved in a bidding war for the Australian mining company Ludowici, but was ultimately outbid by the Danish engineering firm FLSmidth.

In 2014, Weir Group sought to discuss an envisioned merger between itself and the Finnish engineering firm Metso Corporation; however, the board of the latter unanimously rejected the initiative. A £3.7 billion bid to take over Metso was similarly unsuccessful.

During February 2015, the company issued a profit warning predicting significant losses after the US shale market went through a contraction. In response, Weir Group opted to reduce its workforce by approximately 650. Due to the persistence of the oil market's downturn, further jobs cuts followed in late 2019.

In February 2019, the company sold their flow control division to First Reserve. That same year, Weir Group was awarded its largest ever order, valued at £100m, to supply mining equipment for a large iron ore scheme in Western Australia.

During the late 2010s, Weir Group decided that, following losses in its US-centric oil and gas activities, it would reorient towards the mining industry, for which it was developing new technologies to reduce environmental impact. During October 2020, the company sold their oil and gas division to the American equipment manufacturer Caterpillar Inc. in exchange for $405 million.

In April 2022, the company announced that it was withdrawing from its business activities within Russia following the Russian Invasion of Ukraine. That same year, Weir Group formed an alliance with Swiss Tower Mills Minerals AG to market the latter's vertical stirred grinding mills.

The company changed its name from Weir Group plc to Weir plc on 12 August 2026.

== Acquisitions ==
Transaction	Date
Purchased Pompe Gabbioneta, an Italian pump manufacturer for £69m in 2005.	2005
Weir Group acquired SPM Flow Control, Inc for US$653 million (£328 million). SPM manufactures high-pressure well service pumps and related flow control equipment	2007
Acquired African pumps business, CH Warman Pump Group for $231m (£113m)	2007
Acquired Mesa Manufacturing Inc, the Texan based pump manufacturer for $40m	2008
Bought Malaysia-based Linatex for £138m	2010
Agreed to acquire Indian valves manufacturing business, BDK Engineering Industries, Hubli	2010
Announced the acquisition of American Hydro Corporation, a manufacturer of turbines for hydro-electric power stations.	2010
Weir Group and Shengli Oilfield Highland Petroleum Equipment Co. announced the formation of a joint venture to provide high-pressure well service pumps and related flow control equipment to the developing shale gas industry in China.	2010
Agreed to acquire a 60% interest in the South Korean valves business formerly operated by HIM Tech Co Ltd.	2011
Purchased Seaboard Holdings Inc a Houston-based wellhead solutions provider for US$675m (£431m)	2011
Purchased KOP Surface Products, a Singapore provider of advanced pressure control wellhead technologies, systems and services for an enterprise value of US $114m	2017
Purchased ESCO Corporation, a Portland-based global leader in ground engaging tools for mining and construction markets for an enterprise value of US $1.285 billion	2018
Purchased Motion Metrics, a leading Canada-based global mining technology business, for an initial consideration of US $119m	2021
Acquisition of SentianAI, a Swedish-based developer of artificial intelligence solutions.	2023
Purchased Micromine, an Australia‑based mining software company providing solutions across the upstream mining lifecycle, for an enterprise value of £624m (A$1.31bn).	2025
Acquired Townley Engineering and Manufacturing Co., Inc. and Townley Foundry & Machine Co., Inc., US‑based manufacturers of engineered products for minerals processing, for an enterprise value of £111m (US$150m)	2025
Acquired Fast2Mine Tecnologia e Desenvolvimento de Sistemas Ltda., a Brazilian mining software provider specialising in mine management solutions.	2025
Acquired the remaining 50% interest in ESCO Elecmetal Fundición Limitada (ESEL), a Chile‑based manufacturer of ground engaging tools for the mining industry (completion expected in 2026).	2026

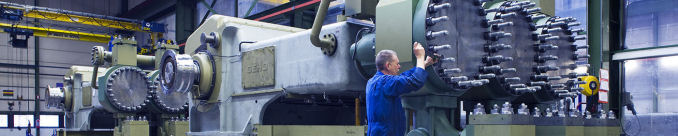
GEHO pump assembly

== People ==
- William Weir, 1st Viscount Weir
- William Weir, 3rd Viscount Weir
- James Kenneth Weir, 2nd Viscount Weir
- Robert Smith, Baron Smith of Kelvin
- Thomas Leith

== See also ==
- List of oilfield service companies
