= James Kenneth Weir =

Scottish peer and businessman

James Kenneth Weir, 2nd Viscount Weir CBE FRSE LLD (1905–1975) was a 20th-century Scottish peer and businessman, most famously chairing the Weir Group.

== Life ==
He was born on 10 September 1905 the son of William Weir, and his wife, Alice Blanche MacConnachie. The family lived at Holmwood in Pollokshields.

James was educated at Oundle School in Northamptonshire then studied at Cambridge University graduating BA in 1926. He then joined the family company of G & J Weir before going to work with the General Electric Company at Schenectady in New York.

In 1931 he became Director of G & J Weir Ltd.

His father was created Viscount Weir in 1938. The title transferred in 1959 on his father's death.

From 1955 he was Chairman of the Weir Group.

In 1967 he was given an honorary doctorate (LLD) by Strathclyde University. In 1970 he was elected a Fellow of the Royal Society of Edinburgh. His proposers were Robert Silver, Alick Buchanan-Smith, Baron Balerno, Anthony Elliot Ritchie and Thomas Diery Patten.

He retired in 1972 and died on 16 August 1975.

== Directorships ==
- Weir Group
- International Nickel Company
- Royal Bank of Scotland
- Caledonian Insurance
- Scottish Television
- Guardian Assurance Company

== Family ==
He married twice: firstly in 1929 to Dorothy Isabel Lucy Crowdy, and following Lucy's death in 1972 the following year he married Mrs Dorothy Hutton (née Dear), a widow.

He had six children by his first wife, of whom William Kenneth James Weir became 3rd Viscount Weir.

Through his first wife he was related to James Fuidge Crowdy, Assistant Secretary to the Governor General of Canada and Charles Keefer, one of the prominent civil engineers of Canada.

== Arms ==
Coat of arms of James Kenneth Weir
Coronet A Coronet of a Viscount Crest A Wing Argent charge with a Thistle slipped proper Escutcheon Azure a Cogwheel Or winged Argent in chief the Sun in Splendour of the second Supporters On either side a Winged Horse Argent hoofed and crined Or Motto Forward Towards The Light

Peerage of the United Kingdom
Preceded by William Weir	Viscount Weir; 1959–1975	Succeeded by William Weir
