= Thomas Keefer =

Canadian civil engineer

Thomas Coltrin Keefer
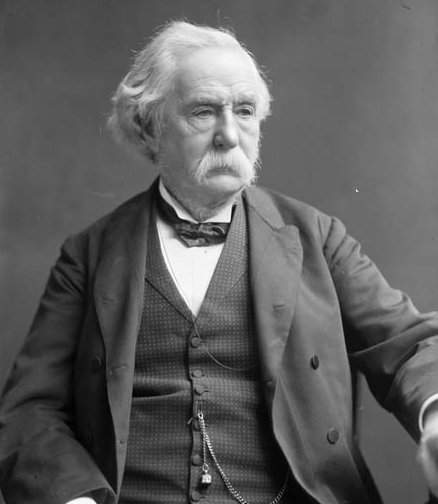
- Born: 4 November 1821; Thorold Township, Upper Canada
- Died: 7 January 1915 (aged 93); Rockcliffe, Ontario
- Occupations: Engineer, author, and businessman
- Title: President of the Royal Society of Canada
- Term: 1898–1899
- Predecessor: Félix-Gabriel Marchand
- Successor: William Robinson Clark
- Children: Charles Keefer
- Relatives: George Keefer (father); Samuel Keefer (half-brother); Thomas McKay (father-in-law)

Thomas Coltrin Keefer CMG (4 November 1821 – 7 January 1915) was a Canadian civil engineer.

== Biography ==
Born into a United Empire Loyalist family in Thorold Township, Upper Canada, the son of George Keefer and Jane Emory, née McBride, his father was chairman of the Welland Canal Company. After attending Upper Canada College he began his engineering training by working on the Erie Canal and continued his learning experience later on the Welland Canal. He became well known for his writings, particularly Philosophy of Railroads and The Canals of Canada: Their Prospects and Influence, and surveyed a railway connecting Kingston, Ontario, and Toronto (1851), was in charge of the survey for a line between Montreal and Kingston, and determined the site for the Victoria Bridge that crosses the St. Lawrence River into Montreal.

Map of the Province of Canada from Lake Superior to the Gulf of St. Lawrence corrected from information obtained by the Geological Survey under the Direction of Sir W.B. Logan and prepared for the Canadian Directory. Thomas. C. Keefer

However, his engineering focus was on water supply. He became chief engineer of the Montreal Water Board and also built the Ottawa Water Works. One of his best-known achievements was the construction of the Hamilton Waterworks, an achievement commemorated by the preservation of the pumping station as the Hamilton Museum of Steam and Technology. His design for the foundations of the Victoria Bridge (“Keefer’s Shoes”) was used in the construction of the bridge. Keefer was a co-founder and the first president of the Canadian Society of Civil Engineers. He was also president of the American Society of Civil Engineers (1888) and of the Canadian Institute. He was made a fellow of the Royal Society of Canada in 1890 and was its president from 1898 to 1899.

He served as chief engineer of the Montreal Water Board and designed the water-supply system for Hamilton, Ontario (1859), as well as the waterworks in Ottawa (1874). His Hamilton pumping station, with its working Gartshore beam engines, has been declared a national historic site. As the "Dean of Canadian engineers," he received many honours, including the presidency of the American Society of Civil Engineers. He was appointed a Companion of the Order of St Michael and St George and an officer of the French Legion of Honour.

He died in Ottawa in 1915. His son, Charles Keefer, was also a notable Canadian civil engineer.

The Keefer Medal was established in 1942, and is awarded annually by the Canadian Society for Civil Engineering for the best civil engineering paper in hydro-technical, transportation or environmental engineering.

== Bibliography ==
- "Thomas Keefer". Dictionary of Canadian Biography (online ed.). University of Toronto Press. 1979–2016.
- Keefer, T.C. (1972). Philosophy of Railroads and Other Essays by Thomas C. Keefer. Toronto: University of Toronto Press. ISBN 0802019110.
- Keefer, T.C. (1869). The Canada Central Railway by Thomas C. Keefer. Ottawa: Bell & Wooodburn. hdl:2027/aeu.ark:/13960/t8tb1q633. ISBN 0665236530.

Professional and academic associations
Preceded by Félix-Gabriel Marchand	President of the Royal Society of Canada; 1898–1899	Succeeded by William Robinson Clark
