= Engineering Institute of Canada =

Canadian engineering society

- Formerly: Canadian Society of Civil Engineers (1887–1918)
- Founded: 24 February 1887
- Headquarters: Ottawa, Ontario
- Website: eic-ici.ca

The Engineering Institute of Canada (EIC; French: l'Institut canadien des ingénieurs; ICI) is a federation of fourteen engineering societies based in Canada, covering a broad range of engineering branches, and with a history going back to 1887. First known as the Canadian Society of Civil Engineers, it became the first national professional engineering society in Canada.

== History ==
The organisation was founded in 1887 under the name Canadian Society of Civil Engineers (not to be confused with the more recent Canadian Society for Civil Engineering). Co-founder Thomas C. Keefer was elected as the first president. Walter Shanly, who helped with the incorporation, became one of the first vice-presidents, together with Casimir Gzowski and John Kennedy. And Henry T. Bovey was the first secretary and treasurer. In 1918 the society was renamed Engineering Institute of Canada with the goal to represent all engineering branches. Later the organisation converted into a federation of more independent member societies, starting with the Canadian Society for Mechanical Engineering in 1970.

From 1951 until its conclusion in 1970, the Institute managed the Athlone Fellowship, a two-year post-graduate program to bring Canadian engineers to the United Kingdom for additional studies or industry experience.

== Member societies ==
The fourteen member societies of the Engineering Institute of Canada are:

- Canadian Dam Association (CDA)
- Canadian Geotechnical Society (CGS) Founded in January 1972 as a member society of the EIC but with a history going back to 1946 when the "Associate Committee on Soil and Snow Mechanics" was created by the National Research Council of Canada.
- Canadian Medical and Biological Engineering Society (CMBES)
- Canadian Nuclear Society (CNS)
- Canadian Society for Bioengineering (CSBE)
- Canadian Society for Civil Engineering (CSCE) The CSCE was established in June 1972 as a constituent society of the EIC. Its membership has roots in the original founding of the EIC in 1887 (whose initial name until 1918 was the Canadian Society of Civil Engineers).
- Canadian Society for Chemical Engineering (CSChE)
- Canadian Society for Engineering Management (CSEM)
- Canadian Society for Mechanical Engineering (CSME) Founded in January 1970 as first constituent society of the EIC.
- Canadian Society of Senior Engineers (CSSE)
- IEEE Canada. The Canadian section of the Institute of Electrical and Electronics Engineers (IEEE) and a member society of the EIC "for the technical fields of electrical, electronics, and computer engineering".
- IISE Canadian Region
- Tunnelling Association of canada (TAC)
- Canadian National Committee of the International Union of Radio Science (CNC-URSI aka URSI Canada)

== Fellows ==
- List of EIC Fellows (FEIC)

Starting in 1963, the Engineering Institute of Canada (EIC) has yearly elected some members to the level of Fellow, to recognize "their excellence in engineering" and "their services to the profession and to society". Initially, Fellows were members of the EIC with the annual number honoured and elected as FEIC varying between one (1967) and seventy-eight (1980). Since then, they are members of their nominating EIC member society with a maximum of twenty elected FEIC annually.

== Leadership ==
Past presidents of the Institute have been:

- 1887 – Thomas Coltrin Keefer
- 1888 – Samuel Keefer
- 1889–1891 – Sir Casimir Gzowski
- 1892 – Sir John Kennedy
- 1893 – Edmund P. Hannaford
- 1894 – P. Alex Peterson
- 1895 – Thomas Munro
- 1896 – Herbert L. Wallis
- 1897 – Thomas Coltrin Keefer
- 1898 – William G. M. Thompson
- 1899 – William T. Jennings
- 1900 – Henry Taylor Bovey
- 1901 – Edward H. Keating
- 1902 – Martin Murphy
- 1903 – Kenneth W. Blackwell
- 1904 – William P. Anderson
- 1905 – Ernest Marceau
- 1906 – Hugh D. Lumsden
- 1907 – W. McLea Walbank
- 1908 – John Galbraith
- 1909 – George A. Mountain
- 1910 – Henry N. Ruttan
- 1911 – Charles H. Rust
- 1912 – William F. Tye
- 1913 – Phelps Johnson
- 1914 – Matthew J. Butler
- 1915 – Francis C. Gamble
- 1916 – George H. Duggan
- 1917 – John S. Dennis
- 1918 – Henry H. Vaughan
- 1919 – Reuben Wells Leonard
- 1920 – Robert A. Ross
- 1921 – John M. R. Fairbairn
- 1922 – John G.M. Sullivan
- 1923 – Arthur T. St-Laurent
- 1924 – Walter J. Francis
- 1924–25 – Arthur Surveyer
- 1926 – George A. Walkem
- 1927 – Albert R. Décary
- 1928 – Julian C. Smith
- 1929 – Charles H. Mitchell
- 1930 – Alexander J. Grant
- 1931 – Sam G. Porter
- 1932 – Charles Camsell
- 1933 – Olivier O. Lefebvre
- 1934 – Frederick P. Shearwood
- 1935 – Frederick A. Gaby
- 1936 – Ernest A. Cleveland
- 1937 – George Joseph Desbarats
- 1938 – John B. Challies
- 1939 – Harold Wilson McKiel
- 1940 – Thomas H. Hogg
- 1941 – Chalmers Jack Mackenzie
- 1942 – Clarence Richard Young
- 1943 – Kenneth M. Cameron
- 1944 – Jacques de Gaspé Beaubien
- 1945 – Edward Phillips Fetherstonhaugh
- 1946 – James Bertram Hayes
- 1947 – Leroy F. Grant
- 1948 – John N. Finlayson
- 1949 – John Edwin Armstrong
- 1950 – James Alfred Vance
- 1951 – Ira P. Macnab
- 1952 – John Bertram Stirling
- 1953 – Ross L. Dobbin
- 1954 – Donald M. Stephens
- 1955 – Richard E. Heartz
- 1956 – Vernon A. McKillop
- 1957 – Clement Matthew Anson
- 1958 – Kenneth Franklin Tupper
- 1959 – John Jeffrey Hanna
- 1960 – George McKinstry Dick
- 1961 – Bristow Guy Ballard
- 1962 – Frederic Lewis Lawton
- 1963 – Thomas Clinton Higginsson
- 1964 – George E. Humphries
- 1965 – Gaëtan-Jules Côté
- 1966 – Joseph Mervyn Hambley
- 1967 – John H. Swerdfeger
- 1968 – Jean-Paul Carrière
- 1969 – William Gordon McKay
- 1970 – William Leslie Hutchison
- 1971 – John H. Dinsmore
- 1972 – William P. Harland
- 1973 – Ian A. Gray
- 1974 – Donald L. Mordell
- 1975 – Robert F. Shaw
- 1976–1977 – Allison E. Steeves
- 1978–1979 – Russell Hood
- 1979–80 – Colin D. Dicenzo
- 1980–81 – V. Douglas Thierman
- 1981 – Jack Hahn
- 1981–82 – Jack Priestman
- 1982–83 – Andrew H. Wilson
- 1983–84 – Eric C. Garland
- 1984–85 – Harold L. Macklin
- 1985–86 – William B. Rice
- 1986–87 – Rémy G. Dussault
- 1987–88 – William A.H. Filer
- 1988–89 – Pieter Van Vliet
- 1989–90 – Arthur P. Earle
- 1990–91 – Nelson Ferguson
- 1991–92 – Stephen G. Revay
- 1992–93 – Colin H. Campbell
- 1993–94 – Raymond P. Benson
- 1994–96 – B. John Plant
- 1996 – Anthony Eastham
- 1996–98 – John L. Seychuk
- 1998–2000 – André L. Rollin
- 2000–01 – Linda Weaver
- 2001–02 – Kenneth W. Putt
- 2002–04 – Guy C. Gosselin
- 2004–06 – Maja Velkovic
- 2006–08 – Kerry Rowe
- 2008–10 – Marc A. Rosen
- 2010–12 – Tony Bennett
- 2012–14 – Jean Zu
- 2014–16 – Om Malik
- 2016–18 – Richard Bathurst
- 2018–20 – Reg Andres
- 2020–22 – Ali Dolatabadi
- 2022–23 – Donna Jean Kilpatrick

== Bibliography ==
- Millard, J. Rodney. The Master Spirit of the Age: Canadian Engineers and the Politics of Professionalism 1887–1922. University of Toronto Press, 1988.
