= John Kennedy (engineer) =

Canadian civil engineer

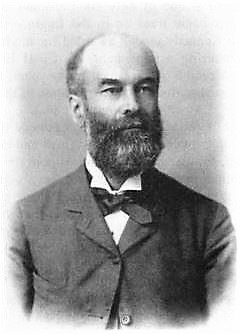
John Kennedy, engineer

Sir John Kennedy (26 September 1838 – 25 October 1921) was a Canadian civil engineer.

He was born at Spencerville, Upper Canada, and was educated at McGill University. In 1863 he was appointed assistant city engineer of Montreal, Quebec. In 1871 he became division engineer, and later chief engineer of the Great Western System of Canada. In 1875-1907 he was chief engineer of the Montreal harbour commission. He deepened the ship canal between Montreal and Quebec from 20 to 27½ feet (6.1 to 8.4 m) and designed and carried out all the improvements in Montreal harbor during 32 years. He was a member of several royal commissions for engineering purposes connected with the Lachine Canal, the causes of floods at Montreal, and the completion of the Trent Valley Canal system.

He was made a Knight Bachelor in 1916.
