= Athlone Fellowship =

The Athlone Fellowship Scheme for the Practical Training in Industry of Canadian Engineering Graduates in Great Britain was a one to two-year post-graduate program to bring Canadian engineers to the United Kingdom for additional studies or industry experience.

== History ==
The Fellowship is named for the Alexander Cambridge, 1st Earl of Athlone, who created the fellowship at the Engineering Institute of Canada near the end of his term as the 59th Governor General of Canada. The program was intended to build more familiarity of British systems among Canadian engineers, and to provide Canadians with study or work experience abroad. Founded in 1951, the fellowship was awarded to 810 engineers, concluding in 1970.

== Structure and recipients ==
The program consisted of a two-year placement in the United Kingdom. Most participants were engineering graduates who attended a British post-secondary institution for additional courses and research. A smaller group were experienced engineers were assigned to work in industry or as a consultant, and some participants split their time between academic and industry experiences. Fellowships were granted to students graduating from universities across Canada.
