= Bertrand Kiefer =

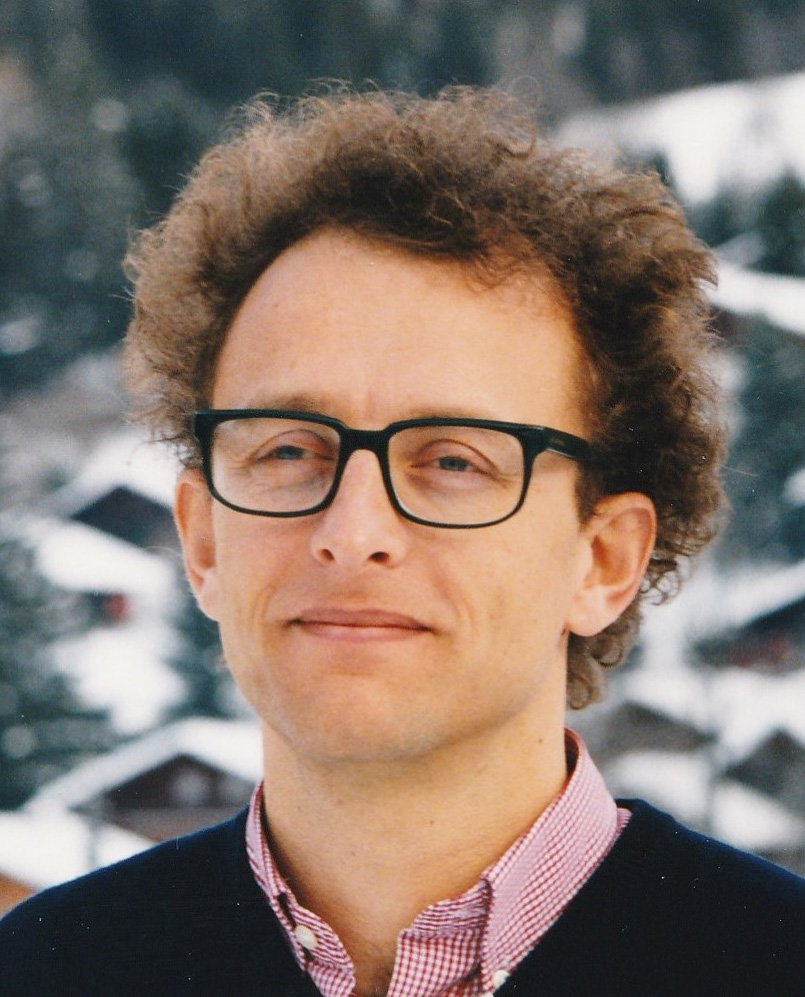
Bertrand Kiefer (in 1999)

Bertrand Kiefer (born 1955) is a Swiss medical doctor, theologian and ethicist. He is editor of the Revue médicale suisse.

Bertrand Kiefer is a member of the Swiss Advisory Commission on Biomedical Ethics.

In May 2025, the University of Lausanne awarded him an honorary doctorate.
