= William Weir, 3rd Viscount Weir =

William Kenneth James Weir, 3rd Viscount Weir FRSA HonFREng (born 9 November 1933) is a British peer and business man. He was chairman of the British Bank of the Middle East and chief executive of the Weir Group.

== Early life ==
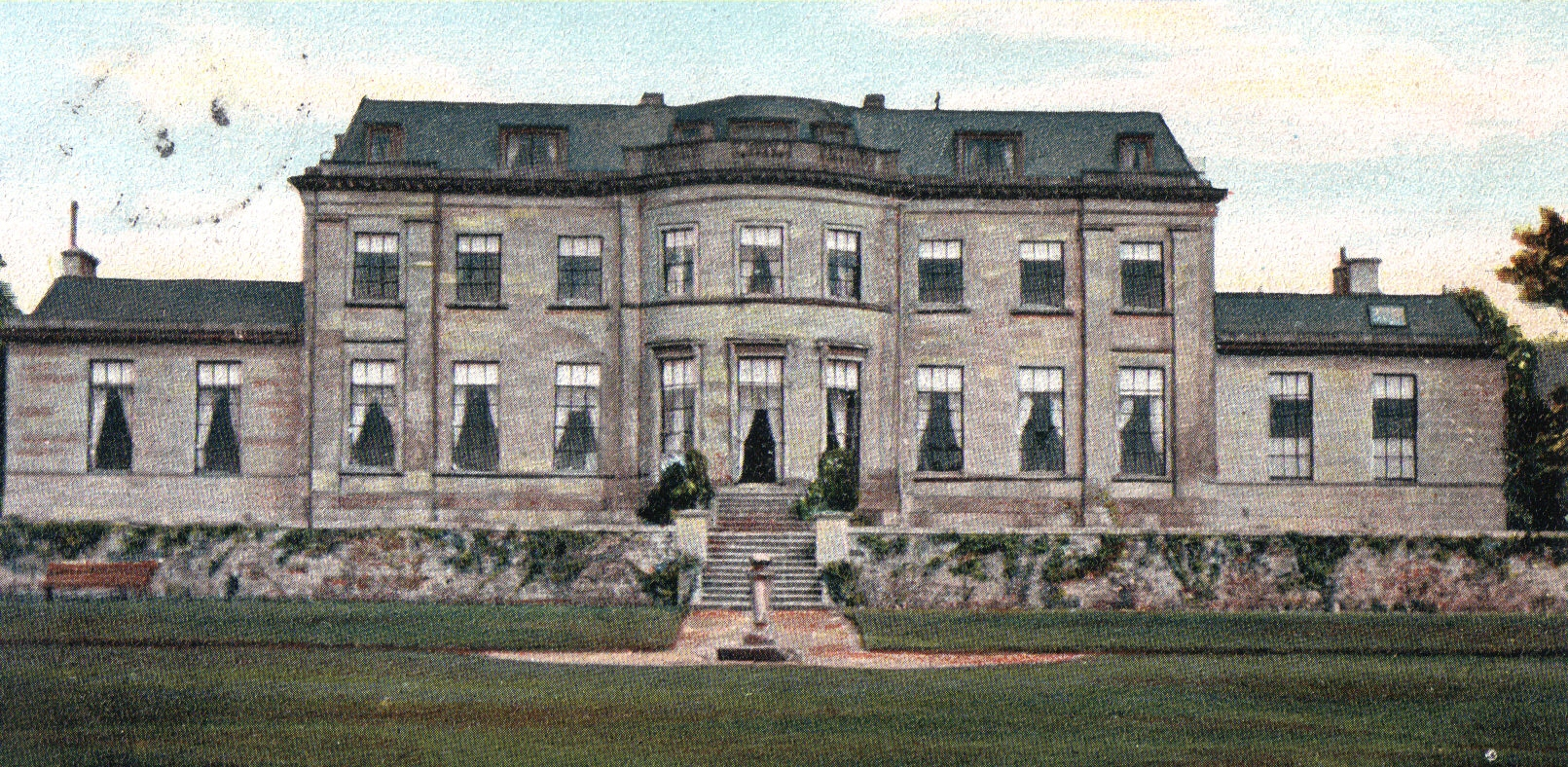
Montgreenan House

The eldest son of James Kenneth Weir, 2nd Viscount Weir, and his wife Dorothy Isabel Lucy Crowdy, Weir has three brothers and had two sisters, but one died in childhood. He grew up at Montgreenan House, Kilwinning, Ayrshire, and was educated at Eton and Trinity College, Cambridge, where he graduated BA in 1955.

== Career ==
Weir was a director of Great Northern Investment Trust from 1970 to 1980 and of St James's Place Capital from 1972 to 1976. He was chief executive of Weir Group PLC between 1972 and 1981, chairman of the British Bank of the Middle East between 1977 and 1979, and vice-chairman and then chairman of the Weir Group between 1983 and 1999. He was also a director of Hambro Life between 1984 and 1986 and of Canadian Pacific from 1989 to 2001. He was chairman of Balfour Beatty in 1996 and of CP Ships in 2001.

On 16 August 1975, Weir succeeded his father as Viscount Weir (1938) and Baron Weir (1918), gaining a seat in the House of Lords. In 1993 he was elected an Honorary Fellow of the Royal Academy of Engineering and in 1996 he was elected as a Fellow of the Royal Society of Arts.

== Personal life ==
On 25 April 1964, Weir married firstly Diana Lucy MacDougall, a daughter of Peter Lewis MacDougall. They were divorced in 1974, after having two children:

- James William Hartland Weir (born 1965)
- Lorna Elizabeth Weir (born 1967)

In November 1976 he married secondly Jacqueline Mary de Chollet, a daughter of Baron Louis de Chollet, and this also ended in divorce. In November 1989 he married thirdly Marina Sevastopoulo, daughter of Marc Sevastopoulo, and they had one son:

- Andrew Alexander Marc Weir (born 1989)

Weir succeeded his father at the family seat, Montgreenan, but it was sold in 1982. In 2003, Weir was living at Rodinghead, Mauchline, Ayrshire.

== Arms ==
Coat of arms of William Weir, 3rd Viscount Weir
Coronet A coronet of a Viscount Crest A Wing argent charged with a thistle slipped proper Escutcheon Azure a cogwheel or winged argent in chief the Sun in Splendour of the second Supporters Two winged horses argent hoofed and crined or Motto Forward Towards the Light
