= William Weir, 1st Viscount Weir =

British viscount (1877–1959)

The Right Honourable The Viscount Weir GCB PC
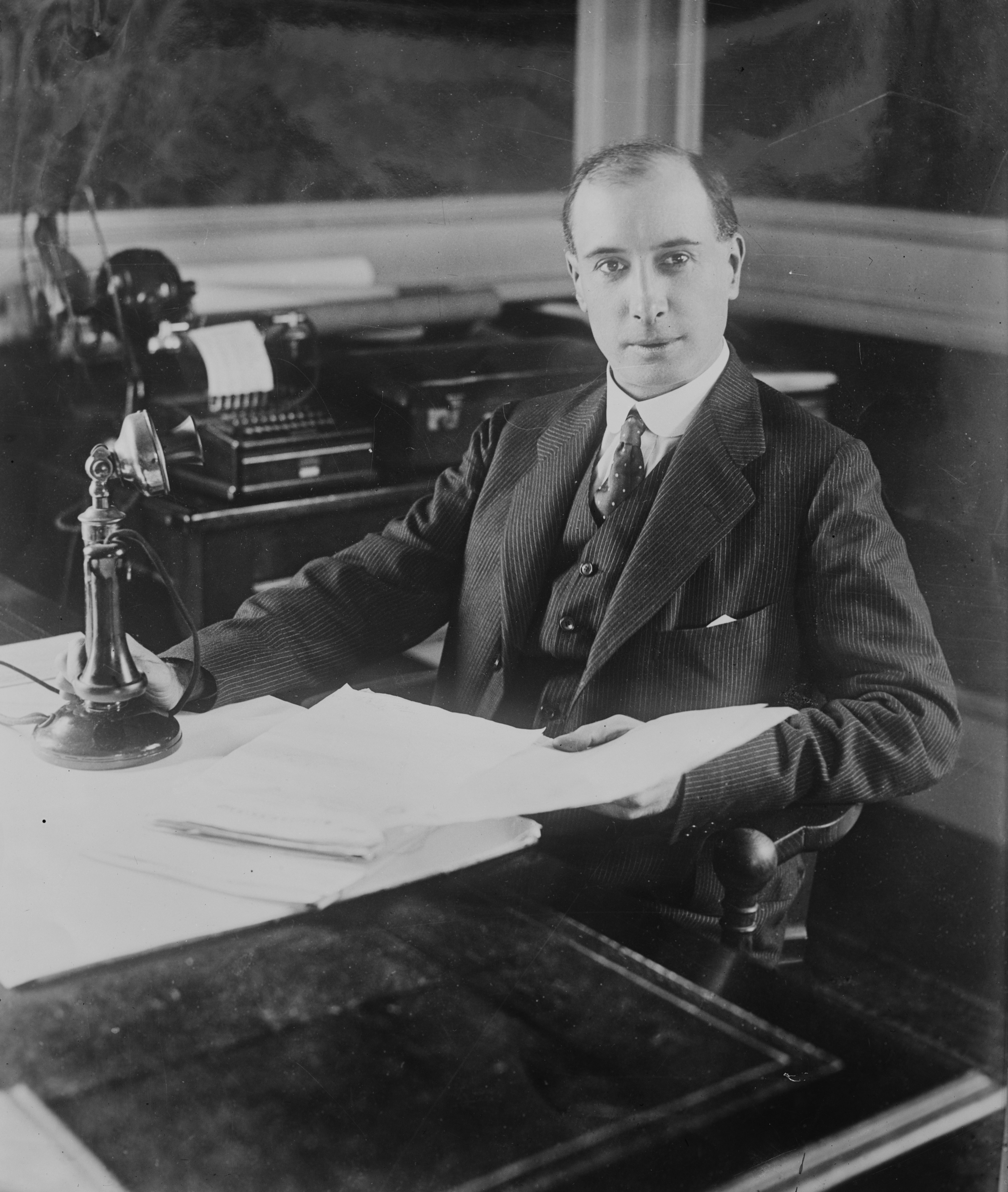
- Weir in 1918

President of the Air Board
- In office 26 April 1918 – 10 January 1919
- Monarch: George V
- Prime Minister: David Lloyd George
- Preceded by: The Lord Rothermere
- Succeeded by: J. E. B. Seely

Personal details
- Born: William Douglas Weir; 12 May 1877 Crosshill, Glasgow, Scotland
- Died: 2 July 1959 (aged 82) Giffnock, Renfrewshire, Scotland
- Children: 3
- Occupation: Industrialist

William Douglas Weir, 1st Viscount Weir GCB PC (12 May 1877 – 2 July 1959) was a Scottish industrialist and politician, who served as President of the Air Council in 1918.

== Early life ==
Weir was born in Glasgow in 1877, the eldest child of James Weir (1842/3–1920) and his wife, Mary Richmond (1848–1931). He attended Allan Glen's School and the High School of Glasgow before entering an apprenticeship in the business established by his father and his uncle, G. and J. Weir, manufacturers of condensers, pumps, and evaporators.

== Industrialist ==
Weir rose to become a director of G. and J. Weir, before serving as managing director between 1902 and 1915, and as chairman from 1910 to 1953. During World War I, he converted his factories to produce explosive shells.

He went on to hold a number of other directorships, including Lloyds Bank (1928–38), Imperial Chemical Industries (1928–53), International Nickel (1928–59), and Shell Transport and Trading (1939). He was also chairman of the Anglo-Scottish Sugar Beet Corporation.

== Public servant ==
David Lloyd George appointed him to the unpaid position of director of munitions in Scotland in July 1915. However, with increasing demands for military aircraft, Lloyd George made Weir the Controller of Aeronautical Supplies and a member of the Air Board in December 1916. He was made a Knight Bachelor in February 1917, He joined the Air Council in November 1917 and became its President in April 1918, resigning in December that year after the end of the war. He was appointed to the Privy Council in April and was raised to the peerage as Baron Weir, of Eastwood in the County of Renfrew, in the summer.

He didn't desire any further political power, and went on to serve on a number of government committees, including those on civil aviation, economies in the fighting services, and co-ordination between the navy, army, and air force. During 1924 and 1925, Weir chaired the committee on electricity supply to plan the rationalisation of the United Kingdom's electrical power industry. His conclusions led to the Electricity (Supply) Act 1926, and the creation of the National Grid and the Central Electricity Board. He was appointed to the Order of the Bath as a Knight Grand Cross in 1934.

In 1934, he undertook the role of President for the Guild of Aid and Day Nursery in Glasgow. At the Annual meeting in November 1934 donated £162 to cover the Day Nursery's debt for the previous year. (refer to The Scotsman newspaper, Saturday 3 November 1934)

In 1935, he was a member defence policy and requirements committee and became advisor to Sir Philip Cunliffe-Lister, later Viscount Swinton upon his appointment as Secretary of State for Air. He was behind the creation of shadow aircraft factories and was an advisor on national defence, resigning his position after Swinton's dismissal. He was created Viscount Weir, of Eastwood in the County of Renfrew in 1938,

He was a founder and later president of the Royal Scottish Automobile Club and was elected to The Other Club in 1932.

Between 1939 and 1941 Weir served as the director-general of explosives at the Ministry of Supply and in 1942 he was chairman of the Tank Board.

== Family life ==
William's younger brother James George Weir was involved in the family business and also in the Air Ministry. He married Alice Blanche MacConnachie (1882–1959), the daughter of John MacConnachie on 2 June 1904. They had two sons and a daughter. Weir died on 2 July 1959 at his home at Giffnock, Renfrewshire, he was aged 82.

He was succeeded by James Kenneth Weir, 2nd Viscount Weir.

== Honours ==
In addition to his knighthoods, barony and viscountcy, Weir received an honorary doctorate from the University of Glasgow in 1919, was elected an honorary member of the American Society of Mechanical Engineers in 1920, received the freedom of the City of London in 1957, received the Order of the Crown of Italy, and became a Commander of the Légion d'honneur.

In 2011 he was one of seven inaugural inductees to the Scottish Engineering Hall of Fame.

Coat of arms of William Weir, 1st Viscount Weir
Coronet A Coronet of a Viscount Crest A Wing Argent charge with a Thistle slipped proper Escutcheon Azure a Cogwheel Or winged Argent in chief the Sun in Splendour of the second Supporters On either side a Winged Horse Argent hoofed and crined Or Motto Forward Towards The Light

== Archives ==
- The Papers of William Douglas Weir, 1877-1959, 1st Viscount Weir of Eastwood held by the Archives of the University of Glasgow
- The Papers of 1st Viscount Weir held by Churchill Archives Centre

== Footnotes ==
- Davenport-Hines, Richard (May 2009). "Weir, William Douglas, first Viscount Weir (1877–1959)". Oxford Dictionary of National Biography (online ed.). Oxford University Press. doi:10.1093/ref:odnb/36818. (Subscription, Wikipedia Library access or UK public library membership required.)

Political offices
Preceded by The Lord Rothermere	President of the Air Council; 1918–1919	Succeeded by J. E. B. Seely
Peerage of the United Kingdom
New creation	Viscount Weir; 1938–1959	Succeeded by James Kenneth Weir
New creation	Baron Weir; 1918–1959	Succeeded by James Kenneth Weir
