= Kiefer =

Kiefer is German for jaw(-bone) or pine tree.

It may also be a variation of the German word Küfer, meaning cooper.

== As a surname ==
Notable people with the surname include:

- Adolph Kiefer (1918–2017), American Olympic swimmer
- Anselm Kiefer (born 1945), German painter and sculptor
- Bertrand Kiefer (born 1955), Swiss physician and ethicist
- David Kiefer (born 1984), American basketball coach
- Friedrich Kiefer (1897–1985), German copepodologist
- George W. Kiefer (1891-1943), American lawyer and politician
- George Kiefer (soccer), American soccer coach at the University of South Florida
- Jack Kiefer (golfer) (1940–1999), American professional golfer
- Jack Kiefer (statistician) (1924–1981), American mathematical-statistician and Professor at Cornell University and University of California, Berkeley
- Jakob Kiefer (1919–1991), German Olympic gymnast
- Jens Kiefer (born 1974), German footballer and manager
- Joscha Kiefer (born 1982), German actor
- Nat G. Kiefer (1939–1985), American politician who served in the Louisiana State Senate
- Nicholas M. Kiefer, statistician and economics professor at Cornell University
- Nicolas Kiefer (born 1977), German Olympic tennis player
- Lee Kiefer (born 1994), American Olympic foil fencer

== As a given name ==
Notable people with Kiefer as a forename include:

- Kiefer (musician) (born 1992), American pianist and producer
- Kiefer Sherwood (born 1995), American ice hockey player
- Kiefer Sutherland (born 1966), Canadian television and film actor
- Kiefer Ravena (born 1993), Filipino basketball player

== Fictional characters ==
Notable fictional characters include:

- Kiefer, the Prince of Estard from Dragon Quest VII.

== See also ==
- Keifer (disambiguation)
- Kieffer
- Kefir
