= Weir (surname) =

Weir is a surname. It may refer to:

== People ==
- Alisha Weir (born 2009), Irish actress
- Alison Weir (born 1951), British writer and historian
- Alison Weir (activist), American activist and writer
- Amanda Weir (born 1986), American Olympic swimmer
- Andrew Weir, 1st Baron Inverforth (1865–1955), British businessman and minister
- Andrew Weir (born 2010), American entrepreneur; youngest entrepreneur to ring the NASDAQ closing bell; founder of TSARP, the TSARP Podcast, and Spark Studio
- Andy Weir (born 1972), American science fiction writer
- Andy Weir (footballer) (1937–1992), Scottish footballer
- Arabella Weir (born 1957), British actress
- Barbara Weir (c. 1945–2023), Indigenous Australian artist and politician
- Benjamin Weir (1923–2016), American missionary held hostage in Lebanon in 1985
- Bill Weir (born 1967), American television journalist
- Bob Weir (1947–2026), American guitar player, a founding member of the Grateful Dead
- Bonnie Weir, American engineer
- Bruce Weir (born 1943), New Zealand geneticist
- Caroline Weir (born 1995), Scottish footballer
- David Weir (footballer) (1863–1933), English footballer
- David Weir (journalist)
- David Weir (athlete) (born 1979), British Paralympic wheelchair athlete
- David Weir (Scottish footballer) (born 1970)
- Doddie Weir (1970–2022), Scottish rugby player
- Elizabeth Weir (born 1948), Canadian politician and lawyer
- Erin Weir (born 1982), Canadian politician
- Fred Weir, Canadian journalist
- Frank Weir (cricketer) (1903–1969), New Zealand cricketer
- Gillian Weir (born 1941), New Zealand organist
- Grace Weir (born 1962), Irish sculptor and interdisciplinary artist
- Graham Weir (born 1984), Scottish footballer
- Harrison Weir (1824–1906), English writer and artist
- J. Alden Weir (1852–1919), American painter
- James Weir (disambiguation), various people named James, Jim or Jimmy Weir
- Jeremy Weir (born 1964), Australian geologist, banker and businessman, CEO of Trafigura
- John Ferguson Weir (1841–1926), American painter and sculptor
- Johnny Weir (born 1984), American figure skater
- Judith Weir (born 1954), British composer
- Leonard Weir (born 1928), Australian actor
- Lindsay Weir (cricketer) (1908–2003), New Zealand Test cricketer
- Michael or Mike Weir (disambiguation), various people
- Molly Weir (1910–2004), British actress
- Norman Weir (1893–1961), New Zealand major general
- Peter Weir (born 1944), Australian film director
- Peter Weir, Baron Weir of Ballyholme (born 1968), Northern Ireland politician
- Peter Weir (footballer) (born 1958), Scottish footballer
- Phil Weir (1901–1963), Scottish footballer
- Robert Weir (disambiguation), various people
- Rob Weir, Canadian politician
- Robbie Weir (born 1988), Northern Irish footballer
- Sammy Weir (born 1941), American football coach and player
- Stephnie Weir (born 1967), American actress, comedian and writer
- Steve Weir, American politician
- Thomas Weir (1599–1670), Scottish Covenanter and presumed occultist
- Thomas Weir (American soldier) (1838–1876), American cavalry captain who attempted to come to the aid of George Armstrong Custer at Custer's Last Stand
- Tom Weir (1914–2006), Scottish mountain climber, author and broadcaster
- Walter Weir (1929–1985), Canadian politician
- William Weir (disambiguation), multiple people

== Fictional characters ==
- Brett Weir, in The Jerky Boys: The Movie
- Elizabeth Weir (Stargate), in the television series Stargate Atlantis and Stargate SG-1
- Lindsay Weir (Freaks and Geeks), in the television series Freaks and Geeks
- Dr. William Weir, in Event Horizon
