= Weir (disambiguation) =

A weir is a barrier across a river. It may also refer to:

== Places ==
=== Canada ===
- Weir, Quebec, an unincorporated village in Montcalm, Quebec

=== India ===
- Weir, Rajasthan
- Weir Dam, Maharashtra

=== United Kingdom ===
- Weir, Lancashire
- Wyre, Orkney, Scotland, which used to be spelt "Weir" occasionally

=== United States ===
- Weir, Kansas
- Weir, Kentucky
- Weir, Mississippi
- Weir, Texas
- Weir, West Virginia
- Weir Farm National Historic Site, Connecticut, USA
- Weir Hill, a park in Massachusetts
- James Weir House, Tennessee, USA
- Weirs Beach, New Hampshire
- The Weirs, an archaeological site in Weirs Beach, New Hampshire

== People and fictional characters ==
- Weir (surname), a list of people and fictional characters
- Sukollawat Kanaros, Thai actor nicknamed "Weir"

== Arts and entertainment ==
- Weirs (album), by Luke Vibert and Jeremy Simmonds
- Weir (song), Killing Heidi's debut single
- The Weir, a 1997 play by Conor McPherson

== Other uses ==
- Fishing weir, a type of fish trap
- Viscount Weir, a title in the Peerage of the United Kingdom
- WEIR, an American radio station
- Weir Group, an engineering company headquartered in Glasgow, Scotland

== See also ==
- Weer (disambiguation)
- Wier (disambiguation)
- Weyr (disambiguation)
