= Boyd C. Fugate =

American politician

Member of the Tennessee House of Representatives for Claiborne County,
- In office 1951-1952

Personal details
- Born: 11 November 1884 Fugates Hill, Russell County, Virginia
- Died: 24 April 1967 (aged 82) Tazewell, Caliborne County, Tennessee
- Spouse: Rachel Parkey
- Occupation: farmer

Boyd Cleveland Fugate (11 November 1884 – 24 April 1967) was a farmer and single-term Tennessee State Representative from Claiborne County.

== Early life and education ==
Boyd Cleveland Fugate was born near Big Moccasin Creek (a tributary of the Holston River) in Russell County, Virginia to parents Robert Boyd Fugate and Mary (Mollie) Anderson Wood. His father was a farm laborer and in 1900 his eldest brother, Henry (a local schoolteacher) lived at home, as did two other brothers (all like Boyd considered farm laborers), a sister and a boarder. The area in which he grew up was called Fugates Hill, as Zechariah Fugate had represented Russell County several times in the Virginia General Assembly beginning in 1806, and some descendants represented Scott County after its creation from Russell County.

== Career ==
In the early 20th century, W. C. and Ollie Parkey and owned property across the Moccasin Gap on the historic Wilderness Road in Claiborne County, Tennessee. In 1918, the year after this man married their daughter, construction began on the first road under a new federal highway program, around Roundtop Mountain between Springdale and Tazewell in Claiborne County, which road is now U.S. Route 25E. In 1920s the Parkeys gave a farm adjoining the new road to Rachel's sister Mary and her husband J.E. Day, but by 1927 the Days had moved to Kentucky, so this man and his wife moved there and farmed.

By 1930, as several years of drought anticipated the Great Depression, Fugate farmed on that property. A decade later, he continued to farm, and his household had expanded to include a son and a boarder.

Elected as a Democrat, Fugate represented Claiborne County for a single term, in the 77th General Assembly of the Tennessee House of Representatives. He belonged to the Methodist Church and was a Freemason.

== Personal life ==
In Bristol, Virginia, in 1917 Fugate married Rachel Parkey (1891–1947), who was the daughter of W. C. and Ollie Parkey. During their three decades of marriage before her death, they had one son, William (Billy) Parkey Fugate (1930–1940), who broke his neck at age 10 and died in a childhood accident.

== Death and legacy ==
The widower Fugate died in Tazewell, Tennessee, and was buried beside his son in the Irish Cemetery. However, their farmhouse burned down in modern times.
