= Werr (surname) =

Werr is a German surname. Notable people with the surname include:

- Joseph Werr (1874–1945), German lawyer and politician, M.P.
- Lamia Al-Gailani Werr (1938–2019), Iraqi archaeologist

== See also ==
- Weir (surname)
