= Andrew Weir =

Andrew or Andy Weir may refer to:

- Andy Weir (born 1972), American science fiction author
- Andrew Weir, 1st Baron Inverforth (1865–1955), British businessman and minister
- Andy Weir (footballer) (born 1937), Scottish footballer
- Andrew Weir & Company, a British shipyard and shipping line owned by Andrew Weir, 1st Baron Inverforth

== See also ==
- Spencer Weir-Daley (Spencer James Andrew Weir-Daley, born 1985), footballer for Montserrat
