= Frank Weir (disambiguation) =

Frank Weir was a musician.

Frank Weir may also refer to:

- Frank Weir (cricketer)
- Frank D. Weir, American horse trainer
