= Alison Weir (disambiguation) =

Alison Weir is a British writer.

Alison Weir may also refer to:

- Alison Weir (activist), American activist and writer
- Alison Francis Weir (cricketer) (1903–1969), New Zealand cricketer
