= Wier =

Wier may refer to:

- Wier, Netherlands, a small village in the Netherlands
- Wier (name), a surname (including a list of people with the name)
- Wier Longleaf Lumber Company, established in 1917 by Robert W. Wier

== See also ==
- Wier-Cook Airport in Indianapolis, Indiana, United States
- Wiergate, Newton County, Texas, site of Wier Longleaf Lumber Company
- Bon Wier, Newton County, Texas, site of Wier Longleaf Lumber Company
- Weir, a small overflow-type dam
- Weir (disambiguation)
