= James Weir =

James, Jim or Jimmy Weir may refer to:

== Sportspeople ==
- James Weir (footballer) (born 1995), English football player who last played for ViOn Zlaté Moravce
- Jerry Weir (1851–1889), Scottish footballer (Queen's Park and Scotland)
- Jim Weir (born 1969), Scottish footballer (Hamilton Academical, Heart of Midlothian, St. Johnstone)
- Jim Weir (basketball), American college basketball player
- Jimmy Weir (footballer, born 1864) (1864–?), Scottish footballer (Dumbarton, Gateshead, Sunderland Albion)
- Jimmy Weir (footballer, born 1887) (1887–1959), Scottish footballer (Celtic, Middlesbrough)
- Jimmy Weir (footballer, born 1939), Scottish footballer (Fulham, York City, Mansfield Town, Luton Town, Tranmere Rovers)

== Politicians ==
- James Weir (politician) (1863–1949), Canadian politician, Alberta MLA (1917–1921)
- James Galloway Weir (1839–1911), Scottish businessman and Liberal Party politician
- Jim Weir (diplomat) (1922–2012), New Zealand diplomat

== Other people ==
- James Weir (architect) (1845–1905), Wesleyan Methodist church architect
- James George Weir (1887–1973), Scottish aviator
- James Kenneth Weir (1905–1975), Scottish peer and businessman
- James Robert Weir (1882–1943), American botanist
- Jim Weir (director), Australian writer-director of the 2023 horror film Birdeater

== See also ==
- James Weir Building, an academic building in Glasgow, Scotland
- James Weir House, an historic building in Tazewell, Tennessee
