= Claiborne County Jail =

Historic jail in Tazewell, Tennessee, US

- U.S. National Register of Historic Places
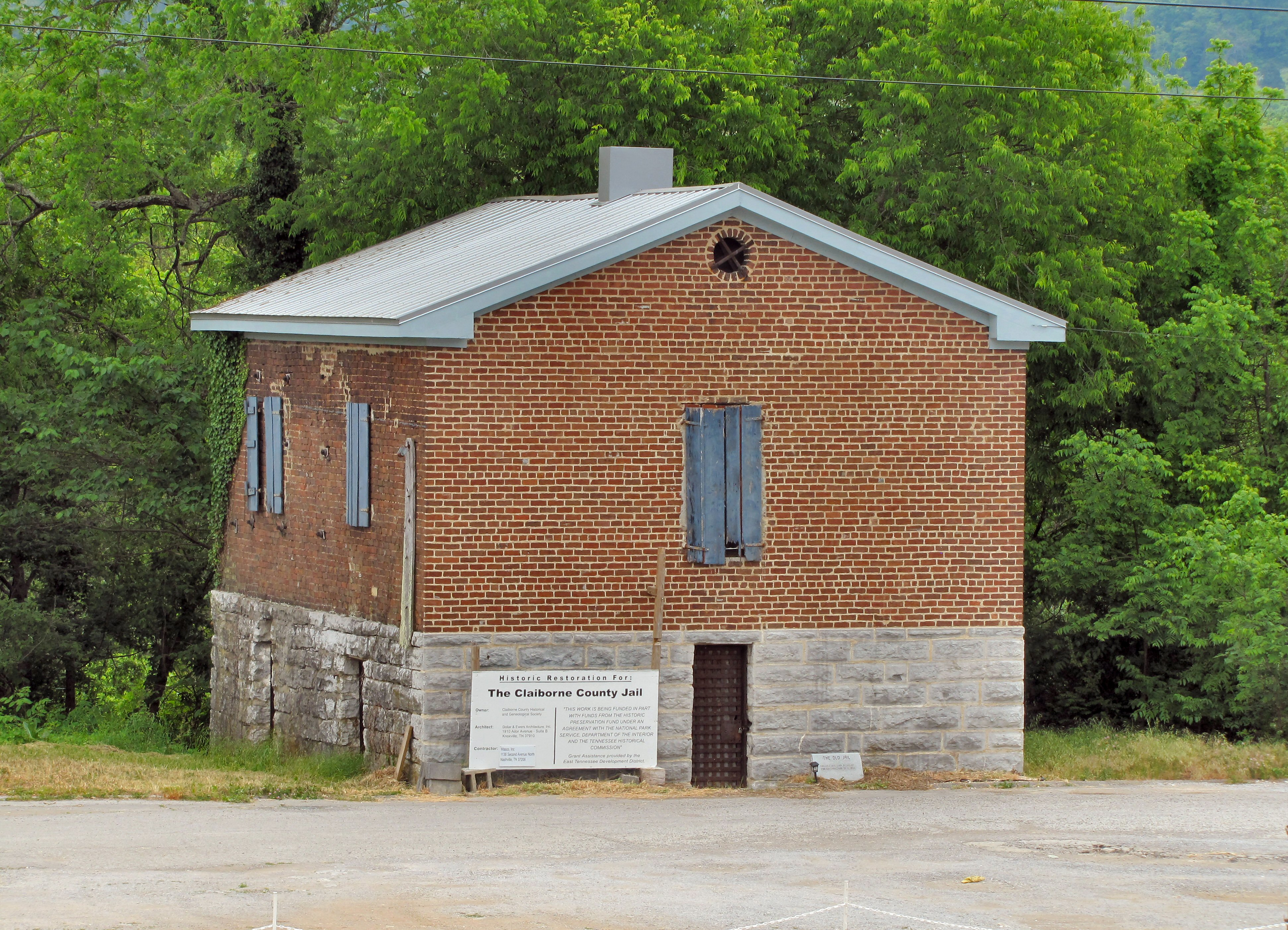

- Location within Tennessee Location within the United States
- Location: TN 33 at TN 25E, Tazewell, Tennessee
- Coordinates: 36°27′9″N 83°34′8″W
- Area: less than one acre
- Built: 1819
- Architectural style: Gable-front
- NRHP reference No.: 07000175
- Added to NRHP: March 21, 2007

The Claiborne County Jail in Tazewell, Tennessee, is a historic jail that is listed on the National Register of Historic Places.

The two-story limestone and brick jail was built in 1819. It replaced Claiborne County's first jail, a crude structure built on the same site in 1804. The 1819 jail was used until 1931.

It was listed on the National Register in 2007.

The county's current jail facility is located in New Tazewell. It typically holds between 160 and 180 inmates.
