= Robert Weir =

Robert Weir may refer to:

- Robert Weir (politician) (1882–1939), Canadian politician
- Robert Walter Weir (1803–1889), American artist
- Robert Weir (discus thrower) (born 1961), English discus thrower
- Robert Stanley Weir (1856–1926), Canadian judge and poet
- Bob Weir (1947–2026), American singer, songwriter, and guitarist with the Grateful Dead
- Robbie Weir (born 1988), Northern Irish footballer
- Rob Weir, Canadian politician

== See also ==
- Robert E. Wier (born 1967), American judge
