= Edith Weir Perry =

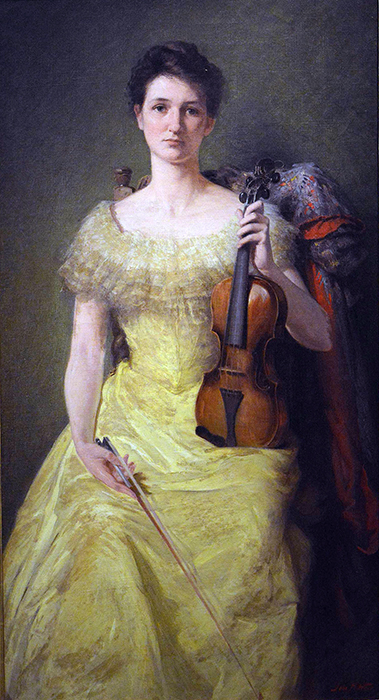
- portrait by John Ferguson Weir, 1900
- Born: August 17, 1875; New Haven
- Died: February 24, 1955 (aged 79); Charleston
- Occupation: Musician, painter, writer
- Spouse(s): James De Wolf Perry
- Parent(s): John Ferguson Weir

Edith Weir Perry (August 17, 1875 – February 24, 1955) was an American miniature painter and author.

Edith Dean Weir was born on August 17, 1875 in New Haven, Connecticut, the second child of painter John Ferguson Weir and Mary French Weir. She studied painting under her father, the first dean of Yale Art School, and was one of the earliest female students at the school, earning her certificate in 1898 after five years of study. Weir exhibited her work in America, including at the Pan-American Exposition and Louisiana Purchase Exposition, and in Europe at London's Royal Academy and the Paris Salon.

She largely gave up her art career after marrying James DeWolf Perry, later the 18th Presiding Bishop of the Episcopal Church, in 1908. They had three children.

She published several books: Under Four Tudors, a biography of Matthew Parker, A Manual for Altar Guilds, and Set Apart, a book about deaconesses.

Edith Weir Perry died on 24 February 1955 in Charleston, South Carolina.
