= Baron Inverforth =

Barony in the Peerage of the United Kingdom

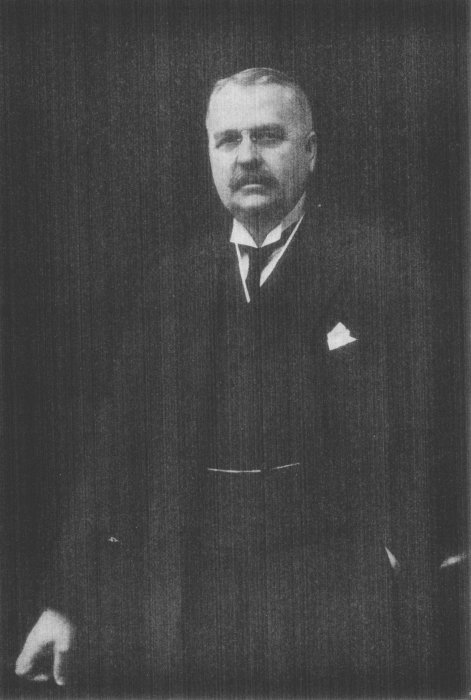
Andrew Weir, 1st Baron Inverforth

Baron Inverforth, of Southgate in the County of Middlesex, is a title in the Peerage of the United Kingdom. It was created in 1919 for the Scottish shipping magnate Andrew Weir. He was head of the firm of Andrew Weir & Co, shipowners, and also served as Minister of Munitions from 1919 to 1921. As of 2014 the title is held by his great-grandson, the fourth Baron, who succeeded his father in 1982.

== Baron Inverforth (1919) ==
- Andrew Weir, 1st Baron Inverforth (1865–1955)
- Andrew Alexander Morton Weir, 2nd Baron Inverforth (1897–1975)
- Andrew Charles Roy Weir, 3rd Baron Inverforth (1932–1982)
- Andrew Peter Weir, 4th Baron Inverforth (b. 1966)

The heir apparent is the present holder's son, Hon. Benjamin Andrew Weir (b. 1997).

== Arms ==
Coat of arms of Baron Inverforth
Crest A dexter and sinister hand each couped at the wrist Proper supporting a lymphad as in the arms. Escutcheon Or on a fess Azure between in chief an escutcheon per bend sinister Azure and Gules charged with a bend Argent and in base a lymphad sail furled Sable pennons flying to the dexter Gules three mullets of the first. Supporters On either side a sailor of the Mercantile Marine Proper. Motto Per Laborem Ad Honorem (Through Toil To Honour)
