= Irene Weir =

American artist and art educator

- Born: January 15, 1862; St. Louis, Missouri
- Died: March 22, 1944 (aged 82); Yorktown Heights, New York
- Education: Yale School of Art
- Occupations: Artist, art educator

Irene Weir (January 15, 1862–March 22, 1944) was an American artist and art educator.

== Biography ==
Irene Weir was born to Walter and Annie Field Weir (née Andrews) in St. Louis, Missouri on January 15, 1862. Weir came from a long line of artists and educators. Her grandfather Robert Walter Weir was an artist and an instructor at the U.S. Military Academy at West Point. Her uncles John Ferguson Weir was an artist and director of the School of Fine Arts at Yale and Julian Alden Weir, a leading figure in New York's art world.

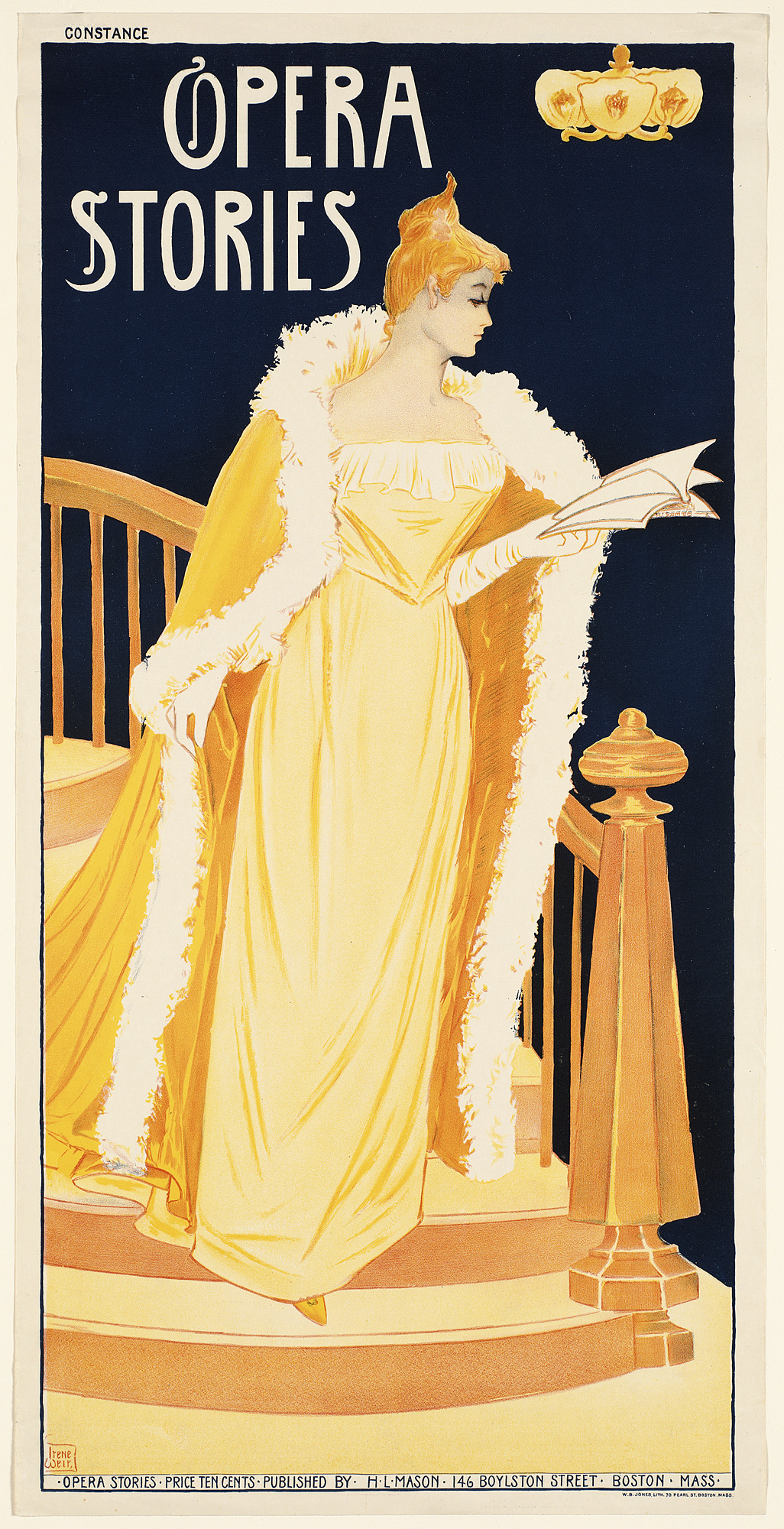
Chromolithograph by Weir

Weir attended Yale from 1881 to 1882 and was awarded a degree in fine arts in 1906 for cumulative artistic achievement rather than coursework. She also studied in France, Spain, Holland, United Kingdom and Italy on two separate trips. On returning to the US Weir went on to teach art in New Haven, Connecticut before moving to teach in Brookline, Massachusetts, public school system. There she went on to become the director of art instruction. Weir also served as director of the Slater Museum School of Art in Norwich, Connecticut.

In 1911, Weir became the director at the Ethical Teaching School and taught pottery, bookbinding, illustration, etching, illustration, sculpture, and painting. In 1917, she founded the School of Design and Liberal Arts and served as director until 1929. As an educator, she championed the idea that art should be for everyone and not just the elite and was enmeshed in everyday life.

In 1923, she attended the École des Beaux Arts Américaine in Fontainebleau, France, and graduated in 1927.

Weir's own works hang at Washington Cathedral, a prison in New York City, and Memorial hospital in New York as well as having been held in exhibitions from New York to London and Washington D.C.

Weir was both an educator and active participant of the art organizations such as the National Society of Etchers, Independent Artists of America, the London Lyceum Club, and the Founders Group of the Museum of Fine Arts, Houston, Texas. She was also director of the Art Alliance of America. She died from cardiovascular disease in 1944 in Yorktown Heights, New York.

== Bibliography ==
- The Greek Painters' Art (1905)
- Outlines of Courses in Design, Representation and Color for High School Classes (1910), with Elizabeth Stone
- Robert W. Weir, Artist (1947)
