= Weyr =

Weyr may refer to:

- Weyr, name for a group of Dragons or a place they reside in the fictional world of Pern
- Eduard Weyr (1852–1903), Czech mathematician who worked in algebra
- Emil Weyr (1848–1894), Austrian mathematician who worked in geometry
- Rudolf Weyr (1847–1914), Austrian sculptor

== See also ==
- Weyr canonical form of a matrix, in algebra
- Weir (disambiguation)
