= Mike Weir (disambiguation) =

Mike Weir (born 1970) is a Canadian golfer.

Mike or Michael Weir may also refer to:

- Mike Weir (politician) (born 1957), Scottish politician
- Mike Weir (American football official), American football official
- Michael Weir (murderer), first man in Britain to have been convicted of the same crime twice
- Michael Weir (footballer) (born 1991), footballer from Jersey
- Michael Scott Weir (1925–2006), British diplomat
- Michael H. Weir Jr. (born 1948), American politician from Maryland

== See also ==
- Mickey Weir (born 1966), Scottish footballer
