= Wier (name) =

Wier is a fairly uncommon surname in the United States. It traces ancestry from the Weir clan in Scotland. There are several variants of the name, but all supposedly go back to de Vere, a British noble family originally of Norman ancestry, from the eponymous town of Ver.

Notable persons with the surname Wier include:

- Allen Wier (born 1946), American writer and professor
- Andy Weir (born 1972), American novelist
- Benjamin Wier (1805–1868), Canadian businessman and politician
- Daniel Wier (1772–1842), Canadian farmer and political figure
- Dara Wier (born 1949), American poet
- Ester Wier (1910–2000), American writer
- Jeanne Wier (1870–1950), American historian and teacher
- John Wier (disambiguation), several persons
- Murray Wier (1926–2016), American basketball player
- Robert E. Wier (born 1967), American judge
- Roy Wier (1888–1963), American politician
- Rusty Wier (1944–2009), American singer-songwriter

== See also ==
- Weyer (disambiguation)
