= John Ferguson Weir =

American painter and sculptor (1841–1926)

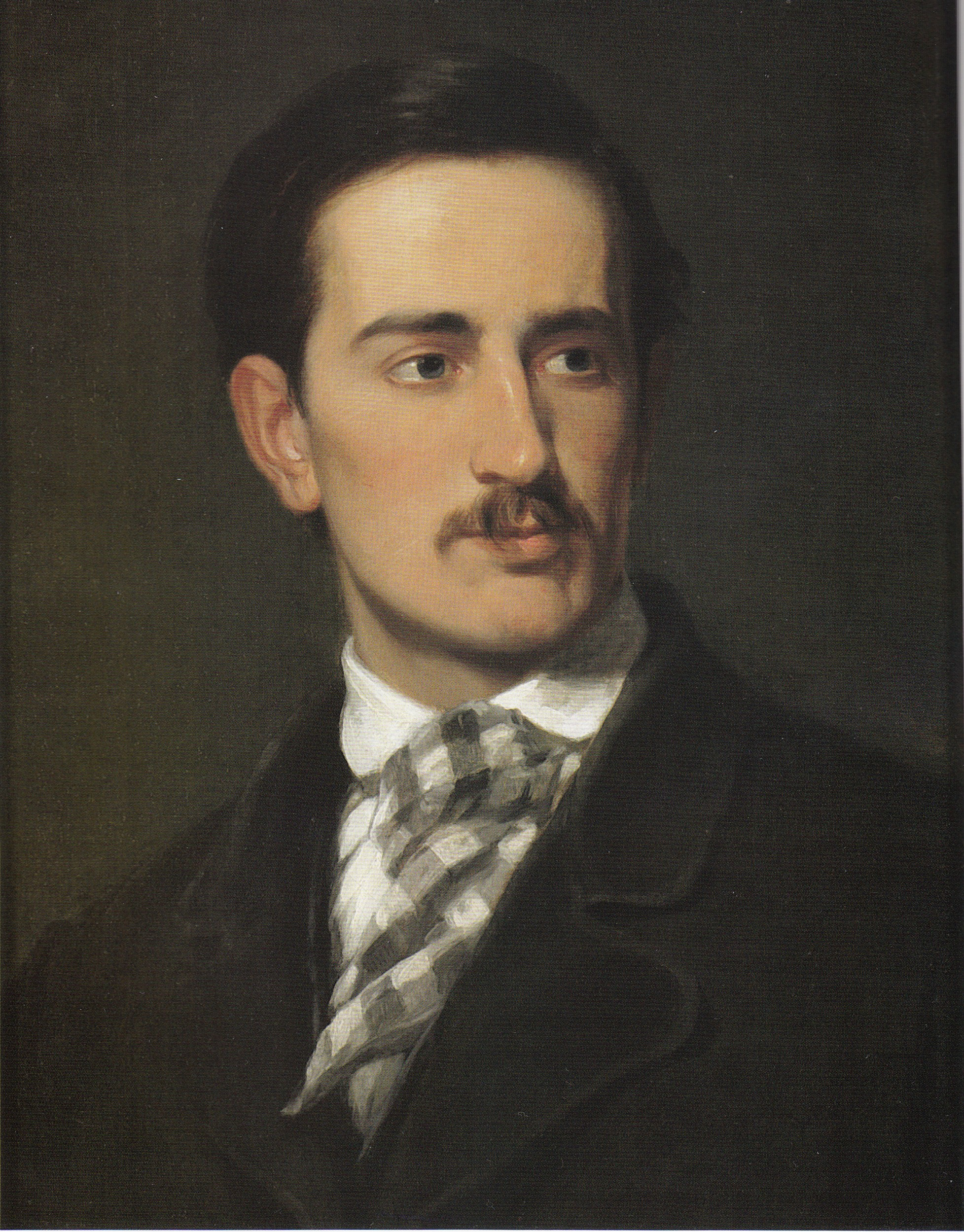
- Robert Walter Weir, "Portrait of John Ferguson Weir", 1864–65
- Born: August 28, 1841; West Point, New York
- Died: April 26, 1926 (aged 84); Providence, Rhode Island
- Resting place: Grove Street Cemetery, New Haven, Connecticut
- Spouse: Mary Hannah French

John Ferguson Weir (August 28, 1841 – April 26, 1926) was an American painter, sculptor, writer, and educator. He was a son of painter Robert Walter Weir, long-time professor of drawing at the Military Academy at West Point. His younger brother, J. Alden Weir, also became a well-known artist who painted in the style of American Impressionism. His niece was artist and educator Irene Weir.

== Biography ==
He was born August 28, 1841, at West Point, New York, and studied with his father Robert Walter Weir and at the National Academy, New York. As a young man, he worked on still life paintings and became proficient at landscapes. In 1862, around the time of his 21st birthday, he was commissioned by the art patron Robert Leighton Stuart to paint a landscape scene of West Point which he named Hudson Highlands, West Point, Summer Afternoon. It is also known as View of the Hudson Highlands, West Point. This commission introduced him to the art world of New York City, and led to his renting a small room in the Tenth Street Studio, where he became acquainted with many of the rising young artists of the day.

His next major work was An Artist's Studio, depicting his father painting in his studio. It was finished in 1864 and then exhibited at the Athenaeum Club and the National Academy of Design. The work became his first major sale, and led to his election as an associate of the National Academy.

Weir became fascinated with the West Point Iron and Cannon Factory, across the Hudson from West Point, a factory that manufactured most of the large guns for the Union during the Civil War. His third major work was The Gun Foundry, 1866, an unusual interior factory scene that depicts the casting of a Parrott Gun. This work was well received at the 1866 spring exhibition of the National Academy of Design and led to his election as a full academician.

His fourth major painting was Forging the Shaft, 1868. It was also painted at the West Point Foundry, but after the end of the Civil War, and showed the creation of a great shaft for the propeller of an ocean liner. Exhibited at the Academy in 1868, it was also very well received. It was destroyed by fire in 1869, and Weir painted a replica between 1874 and 1877.

In 1868 he studied abroad. After his return he was named first director (later dean) of the School of Fine Arts at Yale University. He served in that position from 1869 to 1913. While establishing the foundations of the Yale School of Fine Arts, John enlisted the help of his brother, Julian Alden Weir, who at the time was studying at the École des Beaux-Arts in Paris. John wrote Julian asking for information about how the school was run and how classes were taught. He also asked Julian to send him examples of life drawings, copies of Old Master paintings and studies of heads, done by Julian or his fellow students, that he could use in his classes at Yale. Thus, though John was working at an American university, the curriculum and organization of the school was based largely on European methods, which coincided with the multicultural nature of all three Weirs’ painting careers. When Julian returned to America after living in Paris for four years, he carried on the family legacy and took a teaching position at the Women’s Art School of the Cooper Union, in New York. He, like his brother, participated in the education of women artists at a time when they had few opportunities for formal study in this country. Julian’s teaching was perhaps the most forward-looking among his family, as he embraced both old and new sources, extolling the importance of Old Master paintings, but also promoting the radical style of the Impressionists.

In 1866 John married Mary Hannah French, daughter of West Point professor The Rev. John W. French. Their daughter, Edith Dean Weir, (wife of James De Wolf Perry) was a noted painter of miniatures, studying under Lucia Fairchild Fuller.

Weir also served in the Union Army briefly at the beginning of the Civil War. He died in Providence, Rhode Island on April 8, 1926.

== Works ==
He designed the public fountain on New Haven Green. Among his writings are:

- John Trumbull and his Works (1902)
- Human Destiny in the Light of Revelation (1903)

=== Paintings ===
- Hudson Highlands, West Point, Summer Afternoon (1862)
- An Artist's Studio (1864)
- The Gun Foundry (1866)
- Forging the Shaft (1868, Metropolitan Museum, New York)
- Tapping the Furnace

==== Portraits ====
- Admiral Farragut
- President Dwight of Yale University
- Wells Williams

=== Statues ===
- President Theodore Dwight Woolsey of Yale University
- Professor Benjamin Silliman (elder) of Yale
- Lafayette, Milford, Pennsylvania

=== Gallery ===
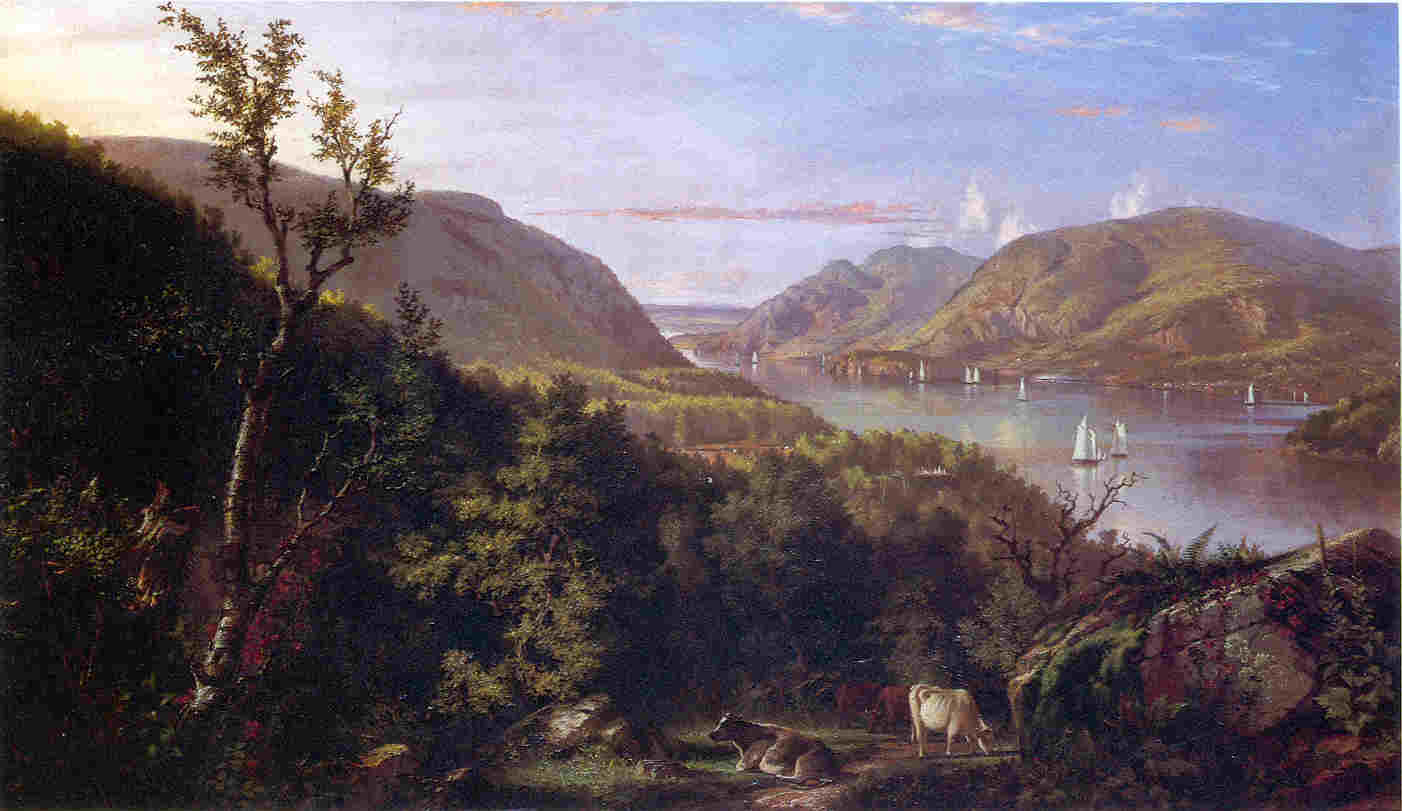
"View of the Hudson Highlands, West Point", 1862

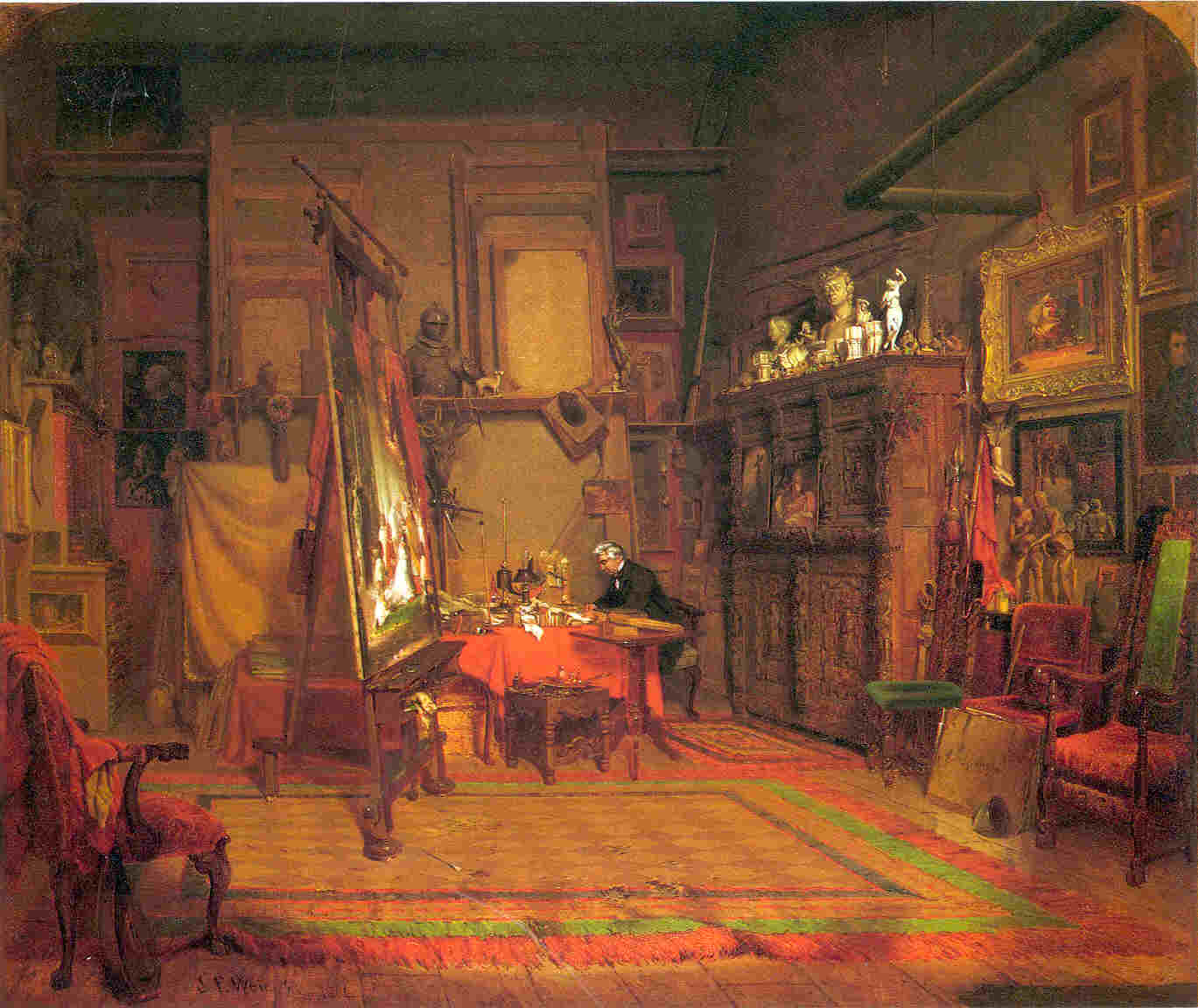
"An Artist's Studio", 1864

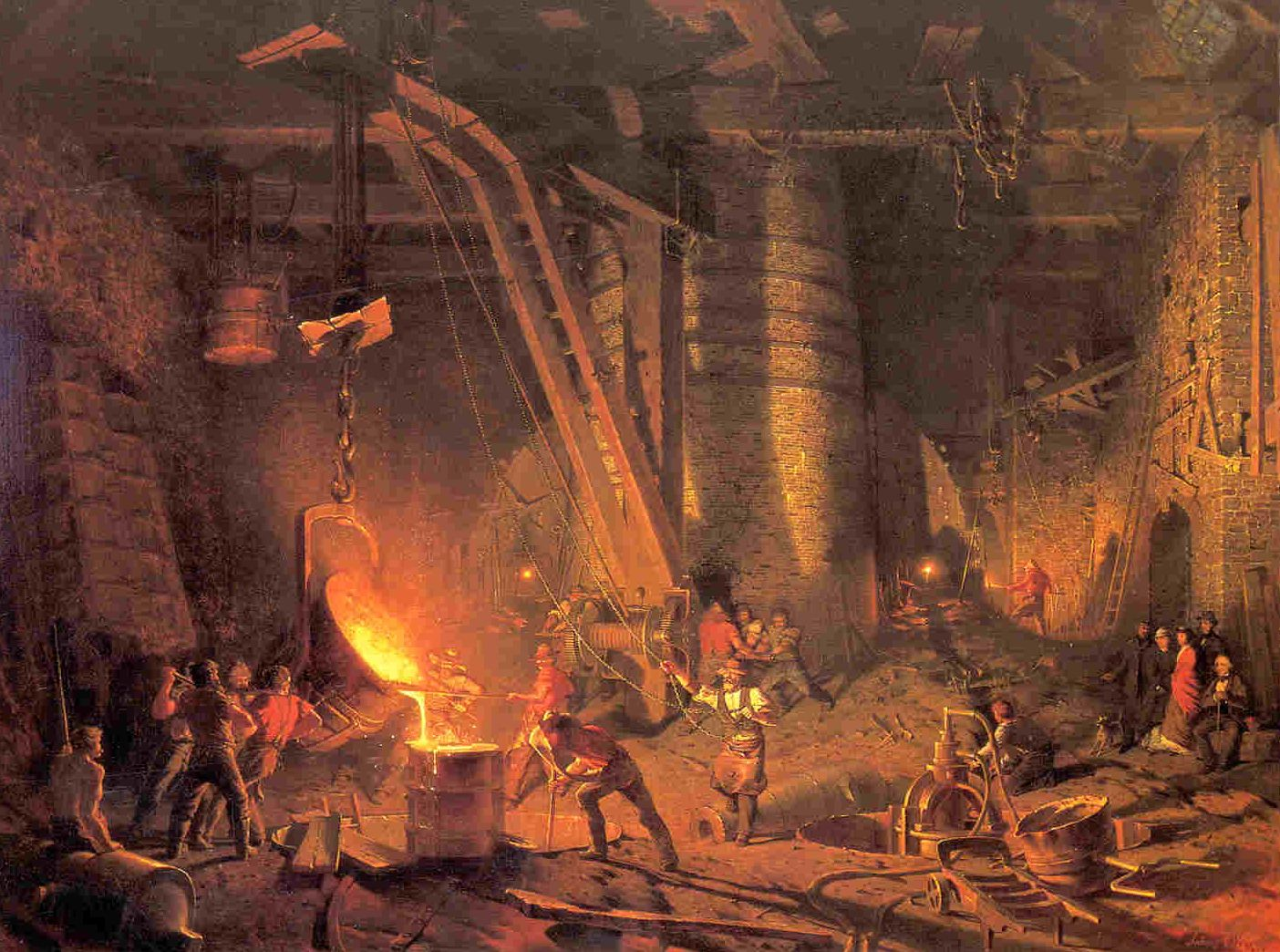
"The Gun Foundry", 1864

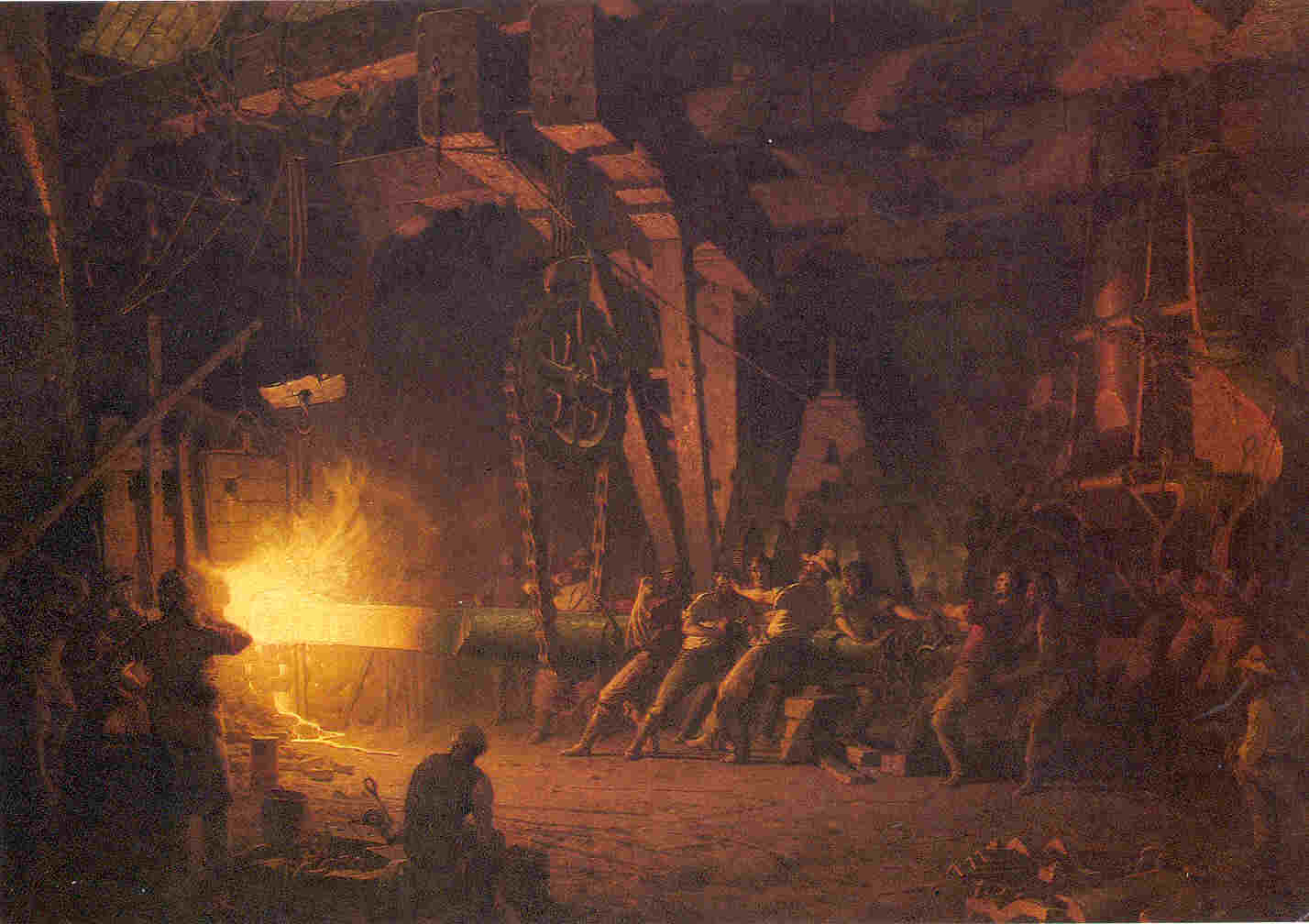
"Forging the Shaft", replica, 1874–77

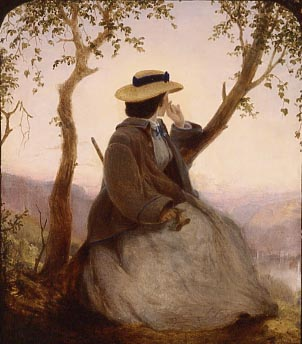
"Mary French" (the artist's future wife), 1862

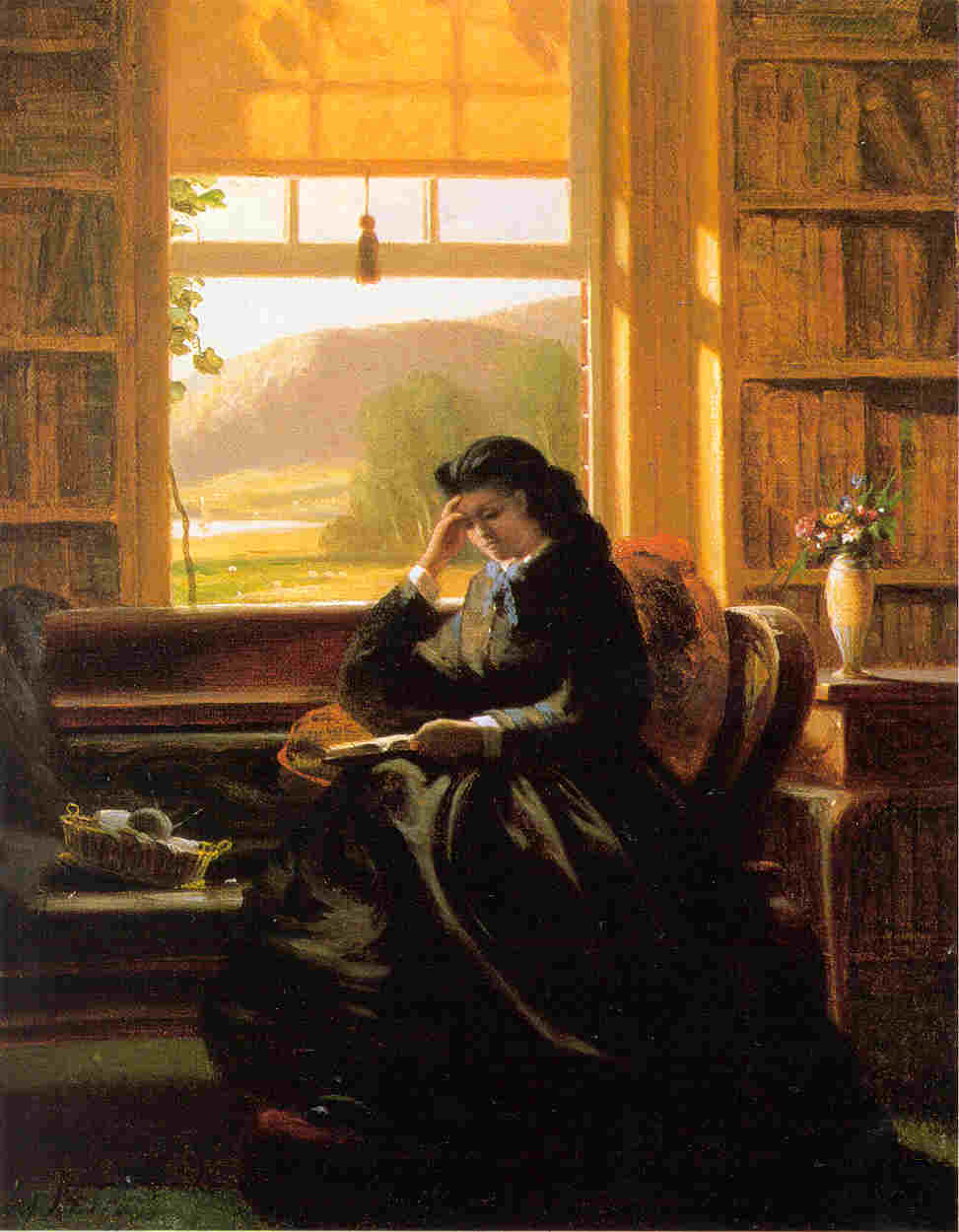
"Autumn Lights", 1866

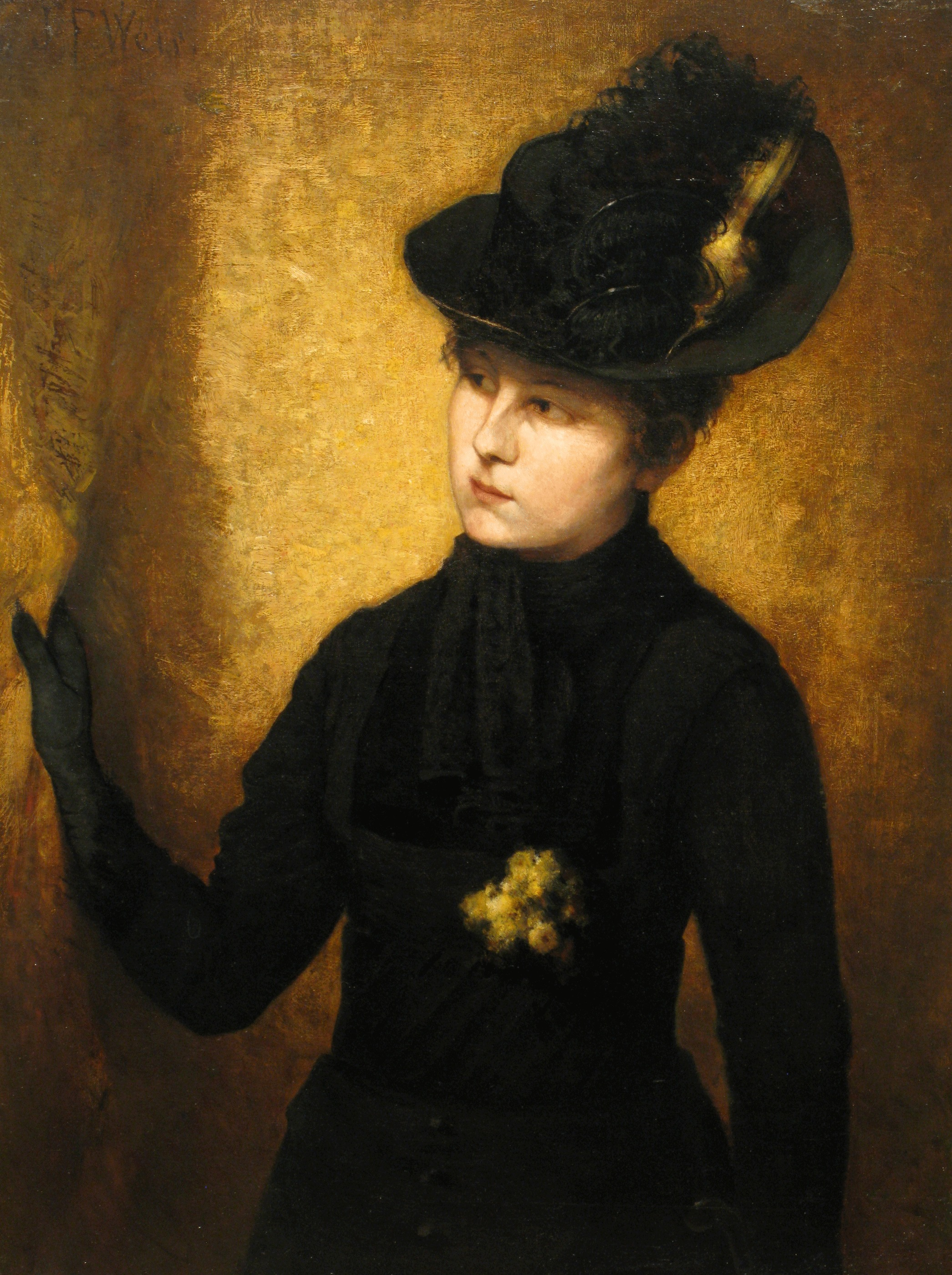
"A Study in Black and Gold, Miss Coe", 1882

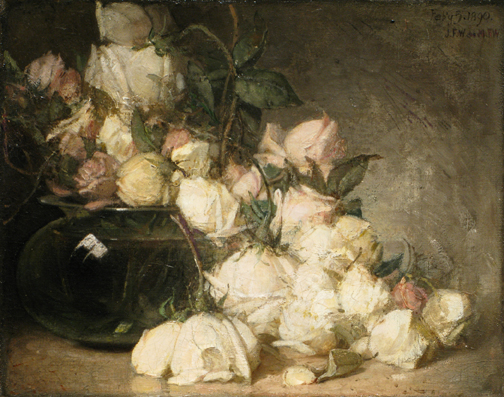
"Bride's Roses", 1890

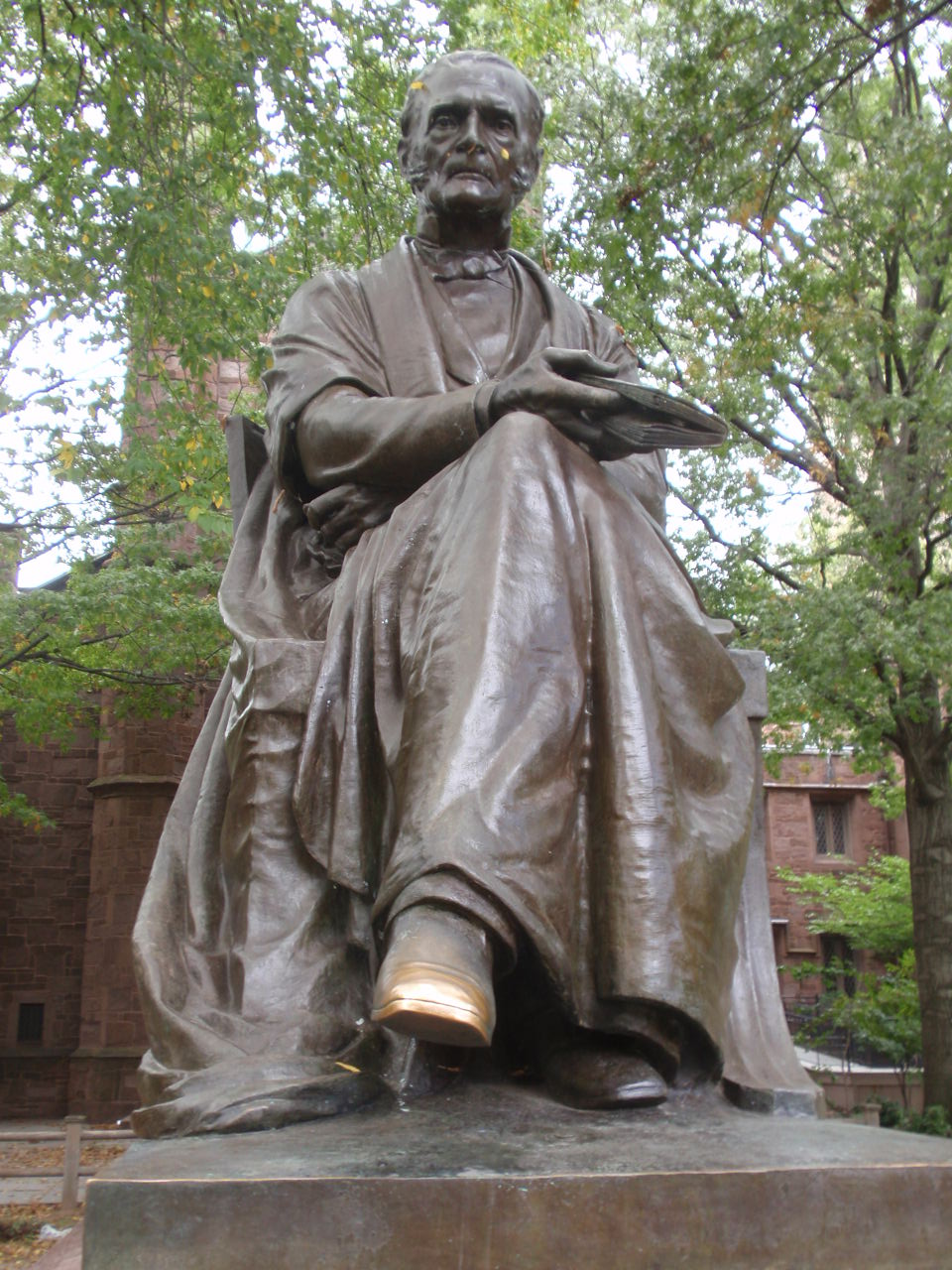
Statue of Theodore Dwight Woolsey, 1895–96

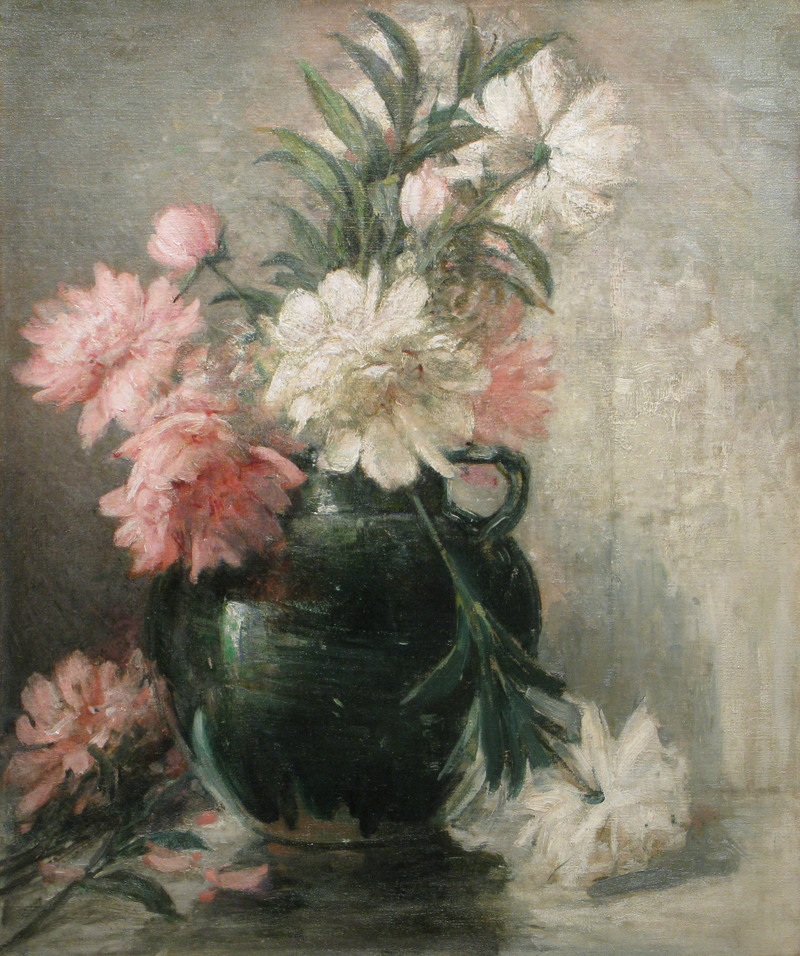
"Peonies", 1899

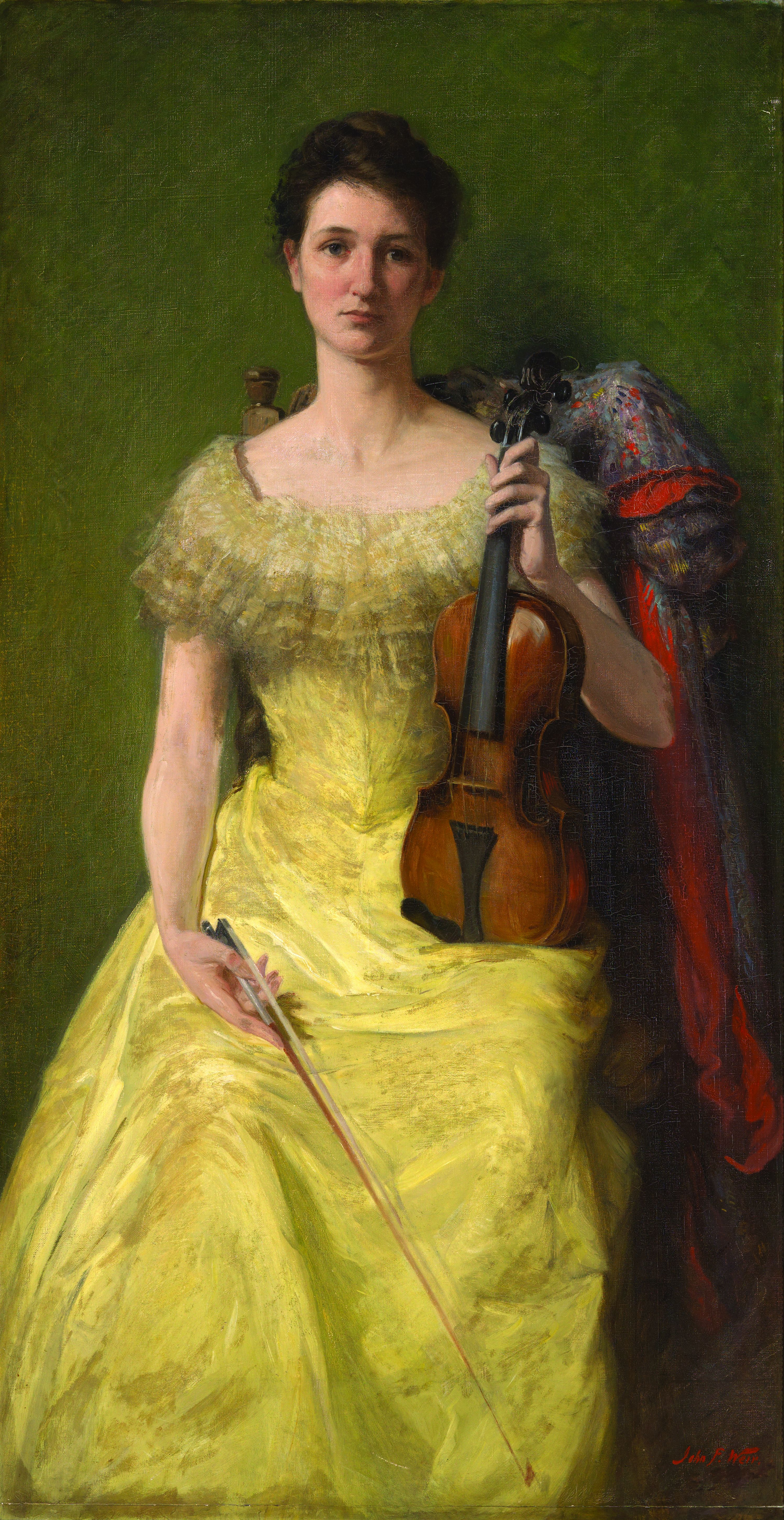
"The Rest, his daughter Edith", 1900–01

== Sources ==
- Fahlman, Betsy (1997). John Ferguson Weir: The Labor of Art. Newark DE: University of Delaware Press. ISBN 0-87413-602-4.
- John Ferguson Weir (1841-1926: And the Weir Family Legacy. Boston MA: Vose Galleries. 2013.
