= Weir, West Virginia =

- Unincorporated community
- Location within West Virginia and the United States Weir (the United States)
- Coordinates: 38°27′29″N 81°23′9″W
- Country: United States
- State: West Virginia
- County: Kanawha
- Elevation: 627 ft (191 m)
- Time zone: UTC-5 (Eastern (EST))
  - Summer (DST): UTC-4 (EDT)
- GNIS ID: 1548883

Weir is an unincorporated community in Kanawha County, West Virginia, United States. Its post office is called Falling Rock.

The community was named after the Weir family, original owners of the town site.
