= Moccasin Gap =

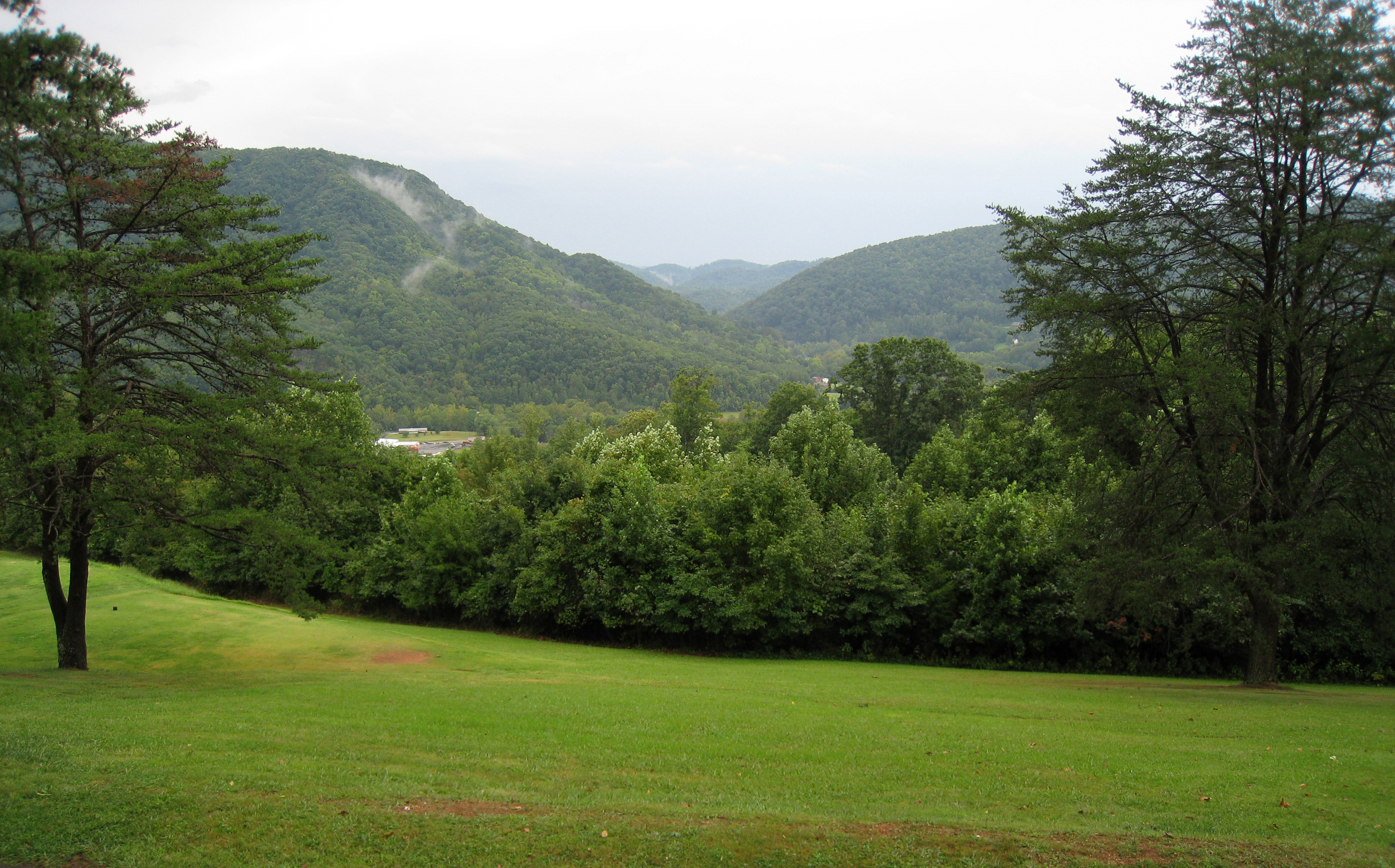
- Moccasin Gap in 2009

- Location within the United States
- Elevation: 1,266 feet (386 m)
- Traversed by: US 23; US 58; US 421; Norfolk Southern Railway; Big Moccasin Creek

Third Approach
- Location: Virginia; United States
- Range: Clinch Mountain
- Coordinates: 36°37′59″N 82°33′08″W
- Topo map: USGS Gate City

Moccasin Gap, also known as Big Moccasin Gap, is a pass in Clinch Mountain, a long ridge within the Appalachian Mountains, at Gate City, Virginia. This gap has a long history as a passageway through the mountain. It was used by the Cherokee and Shawnee, and was the first gap through which the Daniel Boone Wilderness Road passed on its way to the better-known Cumberland Gap and Kentucky. Today it serves as a primary commercial route for industry, retail, and tourism businesses.

== Geography ==
Moccasin Gap is the more dramatic of only two true, natural gaps in the Clinch Mountain ridge. It is located in the present day state of Virginia, in Scott County. It lies between two cities; Weber City is built into the south side of the gap and Gate City is to the northwest.

The area surrounding Moccasin Gap is sedimentary which is formed by the compaction of particles of gravel, sand, silt, mud, and carbonate minerals from the repetitive rise and fall of shallow seas, dating to the Cambrian or Pennsylvanian period. Moccasin Gap is a water gap that is currently traversed by a channel of water, Big Moccasin Creek which is a tributary to the North Fork Holston River.

The climate in Scott County is classified as continental or warm-to-temperate consisting of four seasons. Average temperatures reach 77 °F (25 °C) in the summer months and drop to 36.5 °F (2.5 °C) in the wintertime. The greatest mean of rainfall is also during these times while the least precipitation occurs in the fall.

== History ==
The gap served as a vital route through the mountains for the Cherokee and Shawnee to claimed hunting grounds south of the Clinch River. Later it would also be utilized as an attacking point against settlers in the valleys, a strategy also adopted by military soldiers during both the Revolutionary and Civil wars.

In 1775, Daniel Boone and thirty ax-men built the Indian path into a road, part of the Wilderness Road between the Great Valley of Virginia and the Alleghenies, on his quest to the Kentucky River. This section of the Wilderness Road extended north from the Long Island of the Holston River in Tennessee towards the well-known Cumberland Gap at the boundary of Kentucky, Tennessee, and Virginia.

The establishment of the Wilderness Road through the gap also brought pioneer settlers and tradesmen looking for passage to Kentucky and west. Scott County and the surrounding area praise the gap for its development as it became a significant route in commercial trade to the Ohio River Valley.

Moccasin gap is a level gap which made construction of the railway seamless. In 1886 the Southern Railway began traversing the gap to connect the Appalachia and Holston Valley divisions.

In 2006 the Virginia Department of Transportation began construction to travel routes passing through the gap which included widening of US 23 and involved excavating the gap. This phase (1) of the project was completed in July 2008. Phase 2 and 3 are currently still in progress and awaiting further funding. The plan to connect Route 72 to the bypass will remove a significant portion of the mountain in the gap, altering its natural profile.

== See also ==
- Cumberland Gap
- Pound Gap
- list of mountain passes of Appalachian Mountains
