= James Weir House =

Historic house in Tennessee, United States

- Formerly listed on the U.S. National Register of Historic Places
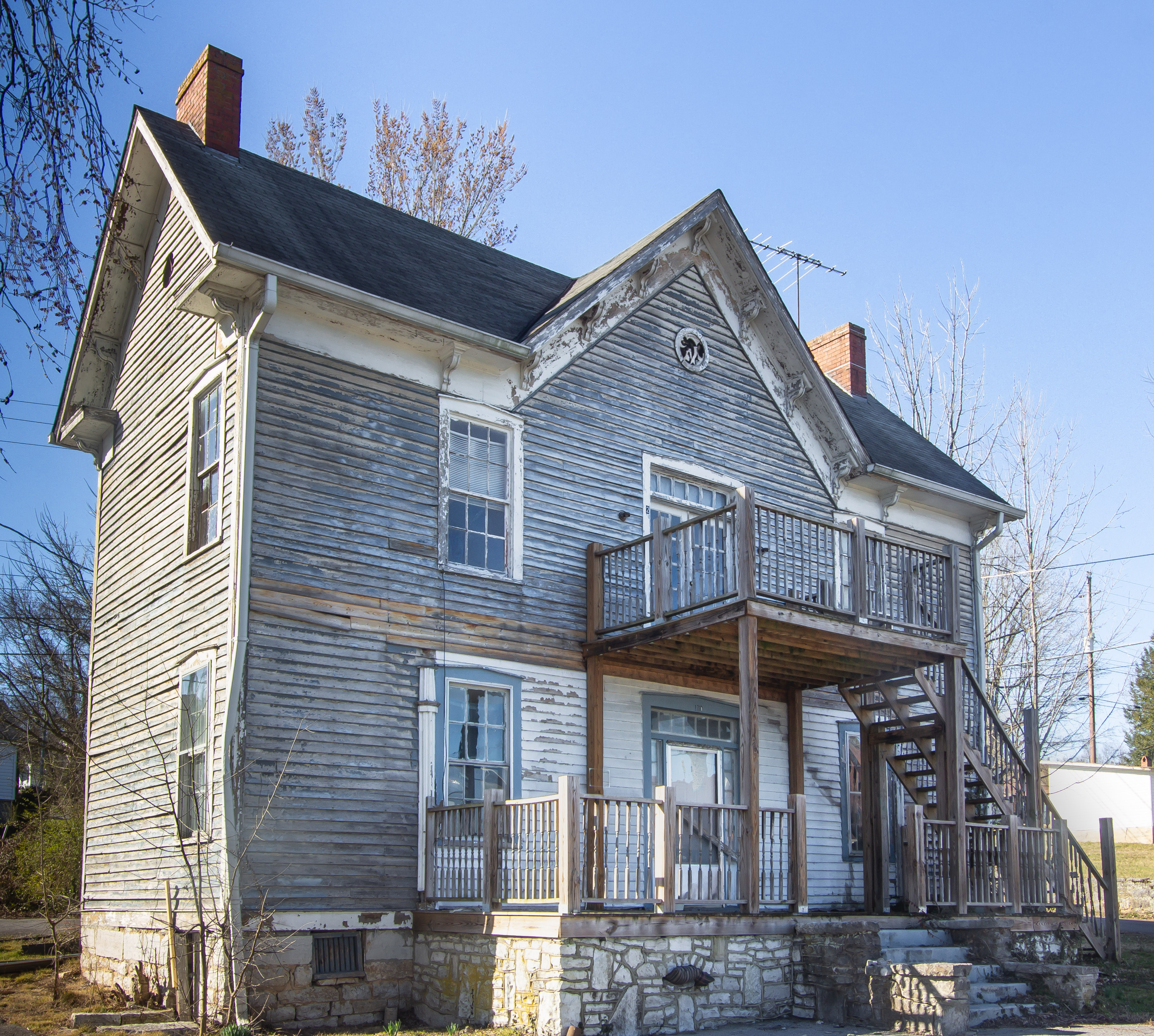

- Location within Tennessee Location within the United States
- Location: Eppes St., Tazewell, Tennessee
- Coordinates: 36°27′12″N 83°34′14″W
- Area: 0.4 acres (0.16 ha)
- Built: 1830
- Built by: James Weir
- NRHP reference No.: 79002419

Significant dates
- Added to NRHP: April 18, 1979
- Removed from NRHP: April 2, 2021

The James Weir House (also called the Weir-McNeeley House) is a historic building formerly located in downtown Tazewell, Tennessee, United States.

It was built by James Weir around 1830 as a two-story single-pen log structure, consisting of American chestnut logs on a limestone foundation. The log frame is covered with siding.

In various times in its history, the house has served as a post office, store, inn, Civil War hospital, and library. In 1977, Samuel Gene McNeeley inherited the house from his parents, who had lived in it since 1920.

In 1979 the house was added to the National Register of Historic Places. The following year, McNeeley, a physician who lived in nearby Norris, Tennessee, sold the house to the Claiborne County government, on the condition that it be used as a library or museum. A library was opened in the house in 1982 and operated until about 2000.

In 2003 the library's board of directors opted to vacate the property, citing space concerns and the near-prohibitive cost of upkeep. In September 2004 the Claiborne County commissioners voted to return ownership of the house to Dr. McNeeley (who died in 2005).

The house was purchased in 2007 by Eleanor Yoakum and moved to her farm south of Tazewell. It was being restored to its original condition by Verlin Singleton. The restoration was expected to be completed early in 2008, after which the house was to be open to the public by appointment only. The house was removed from the National Register in 2021.
