= Robert Walter Weir =

American artist (1803–1889)

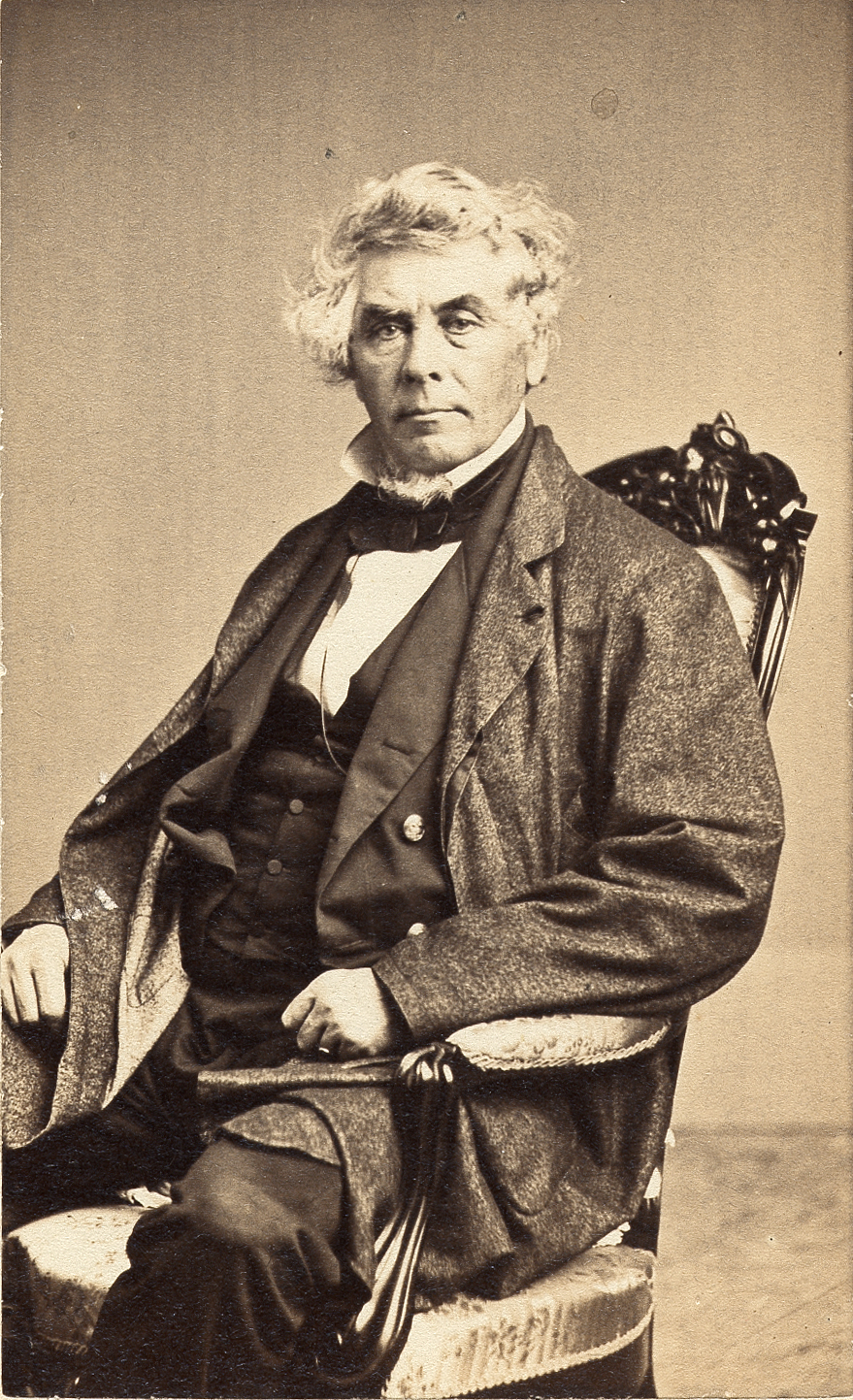
- Robert Walter Weir, circa 1864
- Born: June 18, 1803; New York City, New York, U.S.
- Died: May 1, 1889 (aged 85); New York City, New York, U.S.
- Education: Self-taught
- Known for: Painting
- Movement: Realism, Hudson River School

Robert Walter Weir (June 18, 1803 – May 1, 1889) was an American artist and educator and is considered a painter of the Hudson River School. Weir was elected to the National Academy of Design in 1829 and was an instructor at the United States Military Academy. His best-known work is Embarkation of the Pilgrims in the United States Capitol rotunda in Washington, D.C. More than 450 of his works are known, and he created many unsigned paintings that may never be attributed to him.

== Life and career ==
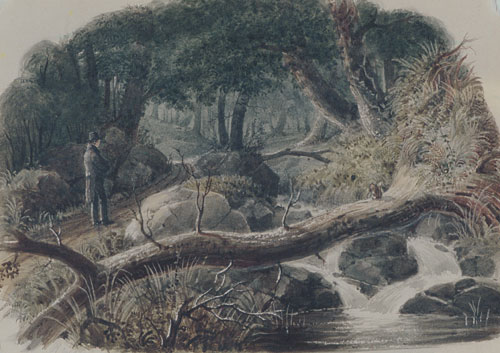
The Entrance To A Wood (1836), watercolor and graphite on paper, at the Metropolitan Museum of Art in New York City

Weir was born to Robert and Mary Katherine Brinckley (or Brinkley) Weir on June 18, 1803 in New York City. His father worked at mercantile and shipping jobs. His mother Mary is remembered for composing the song "The Lord of the Castle." Robert never graduated from college, and he left a job as a mercantile clerk to pursue painting in 1821 at age 18. He studied art in New York City from 1822 to 1824, teaching himself drawing and painting before departing to study in Italy in 1824. He remained in Florence from 1824 to 1825, then in Rome from 1825 to 1827, during which time he studied the works of Michelangelo, Raphael, and other Italian masters of the Renaissance. He returned to New York in 1827 to care for a sick friend and remained there until 1834, becoming an integral part of its artistic community. He was appointed as Teacher of Drawing (1834–1846) then Professor of Drawing (1846–1876) at the United States Military Academy at West Point, New York.

Weir was the fifth artist to hold the position of art instructor at the academy. During his 42 years (1834–1876) in this post, he instructed many of the future commanders of the American Civil War. Among his notable students at West Point were James Abbott McNeill Whistler and Seth Eastman. He also developed a special relationship with Ulysses S. Grant. He died in New York City on May 1, 1889.

=== Children ===
Weir was married twice and had 16 children. Son John Ferguson Weir (born 1841) was a painter and sculptor who became a Member of the National Academy of Design in 1866, and was made director of the Yale University Art School in 1868. Son Julian Alden Weir (born 1852) studied under his father and under J.-L. Gérôme and became a distinguished portrait, figure, and landscape painter. He was one of the founders of the Society of American Artists in 1877, and he became a member of the National Academy of Design (1886) and of the Ten American Painters, New York. Daughter Emma Weir married Thomas Lincoln Casey Sr., an American army officer and Chief of Engineers. Daughter Helen Rutgers Weir married Thomas Sturgis, a developer of Cheyenne, Wyoming, and the second New York City Fire Commissioner. His granddaughter was the educator and artist Irene Weir.

== Works ==
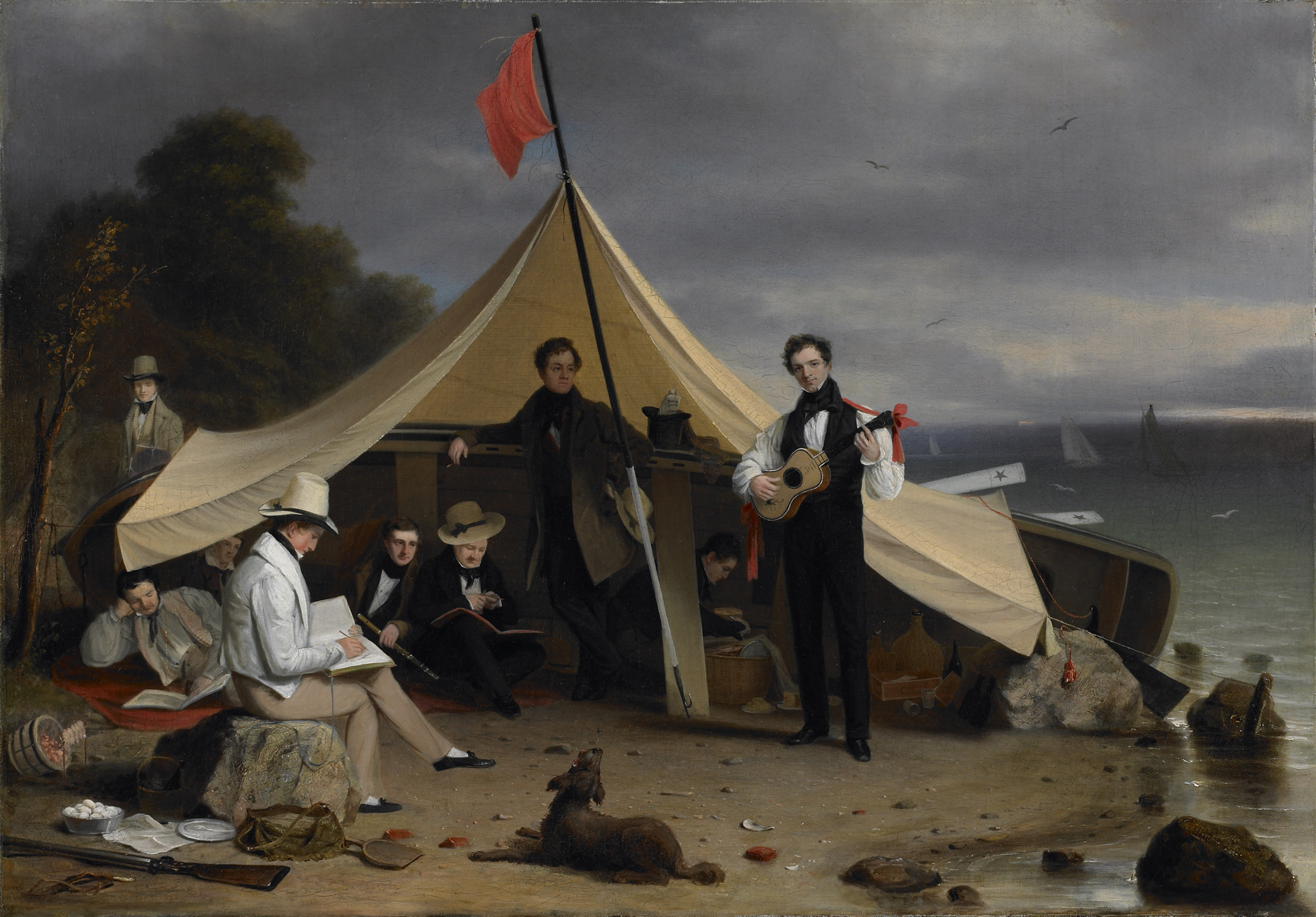
The Greenwich Boat Club, 1833, Princeton University Art Museum

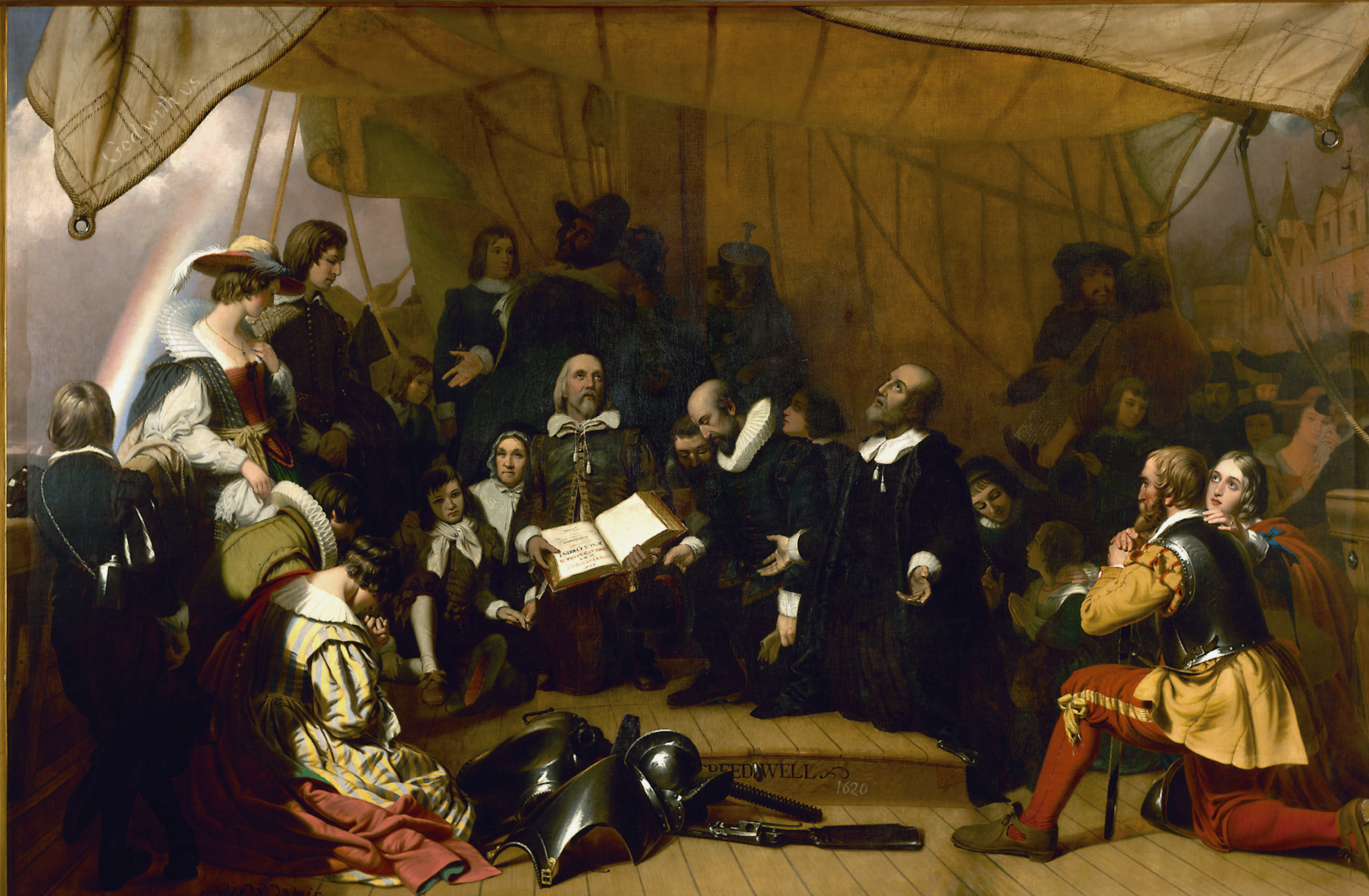
Embarkation of the Pilgrims (commissioned 1837; placed 1844), oil on canvas, 12 x 18 feet, United States Capitol Rotunda, Washington, DC

Weir was considered part of the Hudson River School of American art. One of his best known paintings is The Embarkation of the Pilgrims which hangs in the United States Capitol rotunda. He was commissioned by the United States Congress in 1837 and the painting was placed in the rotunda in December 1843. His canvases deal principally with historical subjects, though he also did several portraits.

Exhibits at the National Academy of Design frequently included Weir's paintings – seventeen in 1832 alone. Many were also engraved and published in The Token and Atlantic Souvenir annual gift book, reaching a wider audience. Among those are Greek Lovers (1830), Bourbon's Last March (1835), Sunset on the Hudson (1850), and The Spy (1836), the last of which being inspired by James Fenimore Cooper's 1821 novel of the same name.

=== Works ===
- Paul Preaching at Athens
- Two portraits of Sylvanus Thayer [Pappus, p. 210]
- Embarkation of the Pilgrims at Delft Haven, Holland, July 22, 1620
- Picnic Along the Hudson
- Landing of Henry Hudson (1835)
- Saint Nicholas (1837), in the collection of the Smithsonian American Art Museum
- Amerigo Vespucci (1842)
- A Compositor Setting Type (ca. 1844)
- Portrait of Robert E. Lee, one of only two portraits of Lee painted before the Civil War
- Microscope (1849)
- Evening of the Crucifixion (1867)
- Virgil and Dante crossing the Styx (1869)
- Seascape with Lighthouse (1869), exhibited at Whitney Museum, New York, 1975, in exhibition entitled "Seascape and the American Imagination"
- The Portico of the Palace of Octavia, Rome (1870)
- Net Mending on Nantucket (1870)
- Christ in the Garden (1873)
- Our Lord in the Mount of Olives (1877)
- Indian Falls (1878)
- Titan in his Studio
- Columbus before the Council of Salamanca (1884)
- The Bourbons Last March, published in The Token and Atlantic Souvenir (1835)
- Indian Captive
- Taking the Veil
- The Evening of the Crucifixion
- Portrait of Jared Mansfield
- Portrait of General Winfield Scott
- Portrait of Dennis Hart Mahan
- Il Penseroso

== Portraits ==
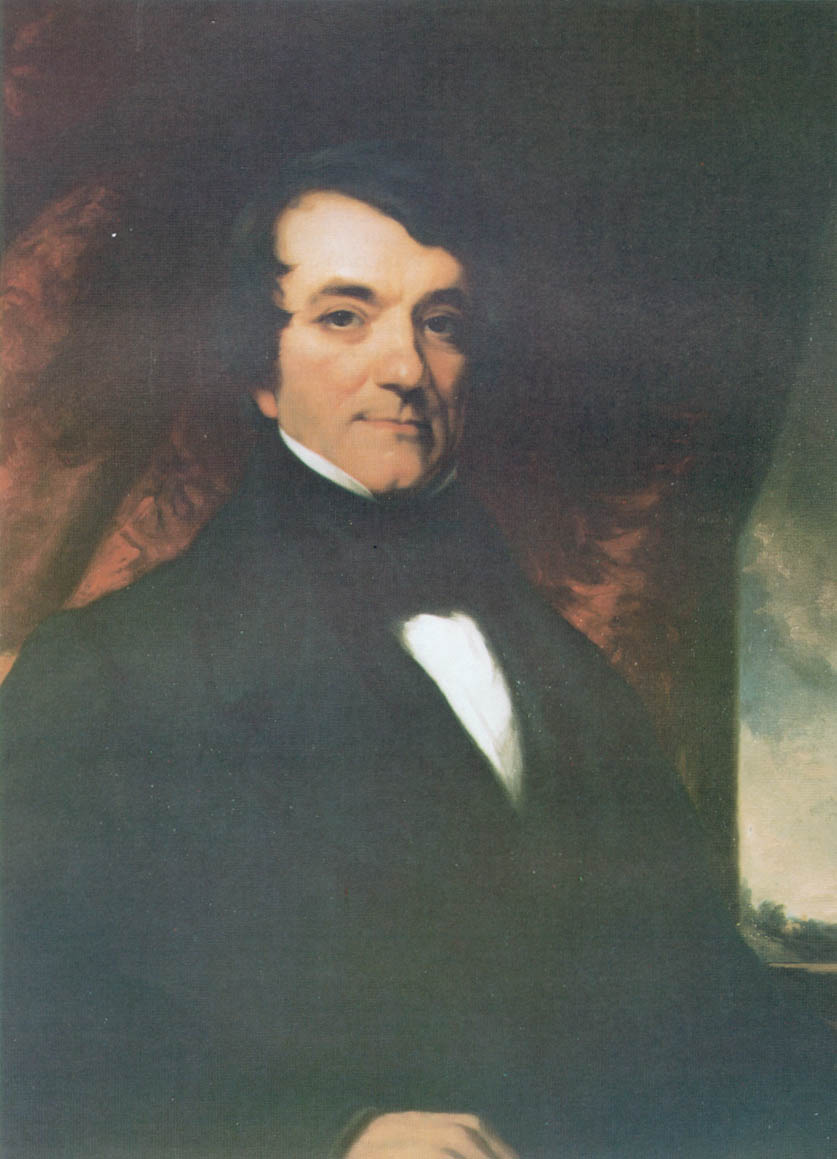
John Canfield Spencer

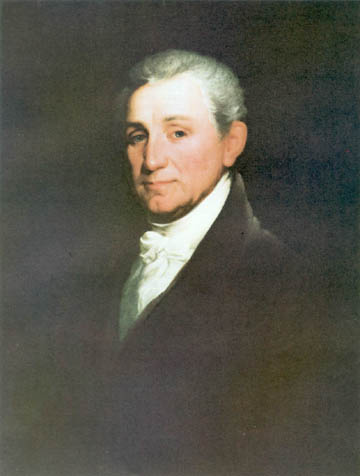
James Monroe, (after Durand and Stuart)

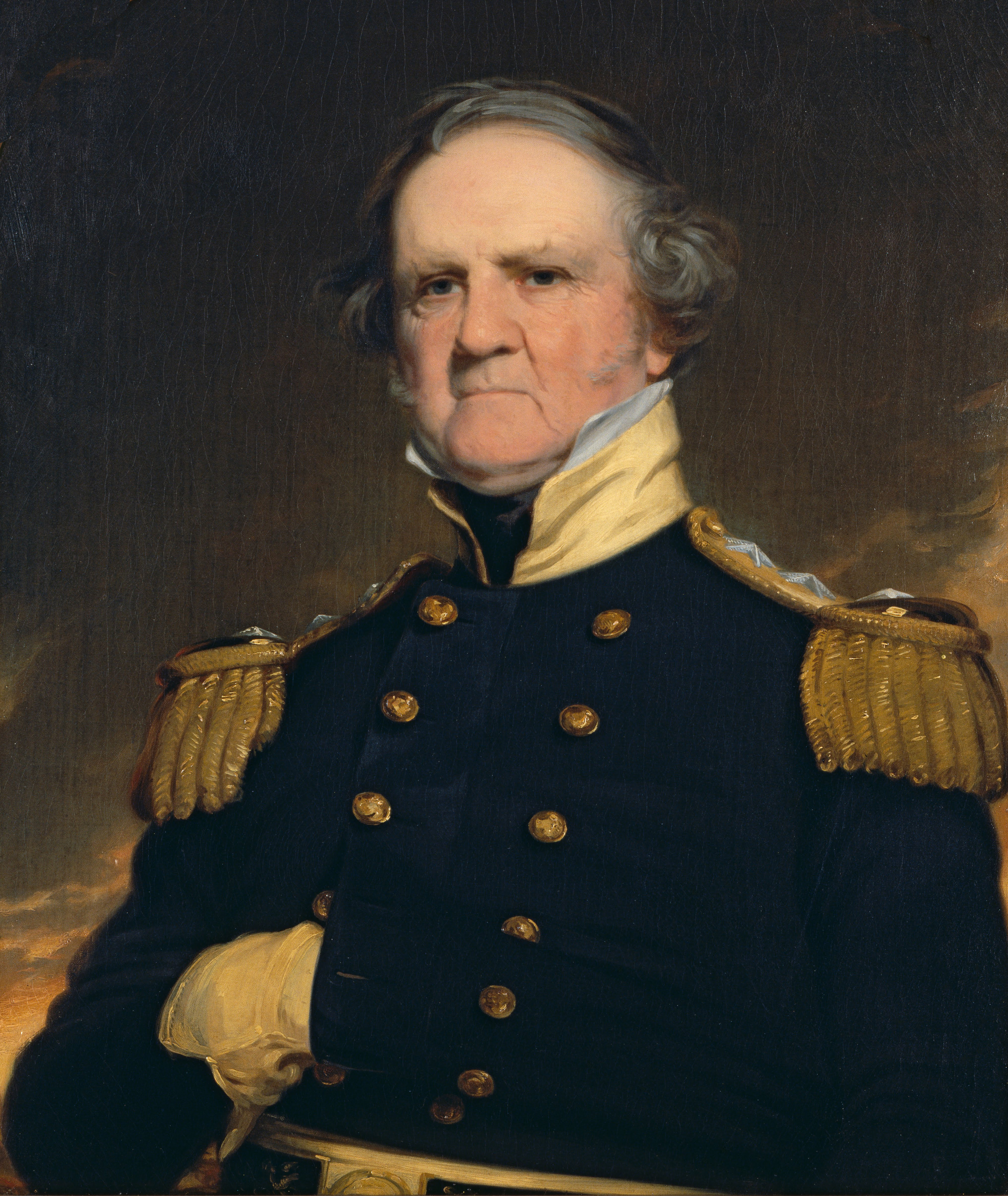
Winfield Scott

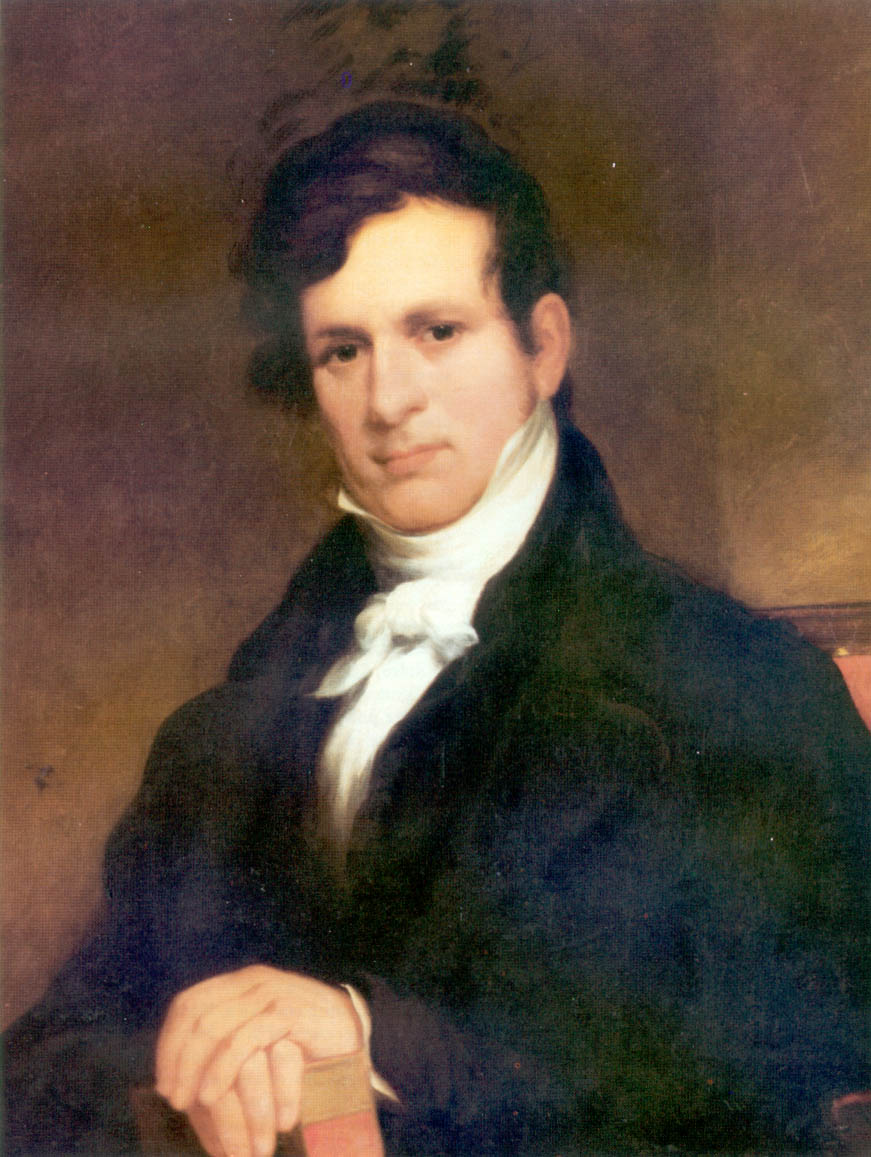
John Eaton

== Other works ==
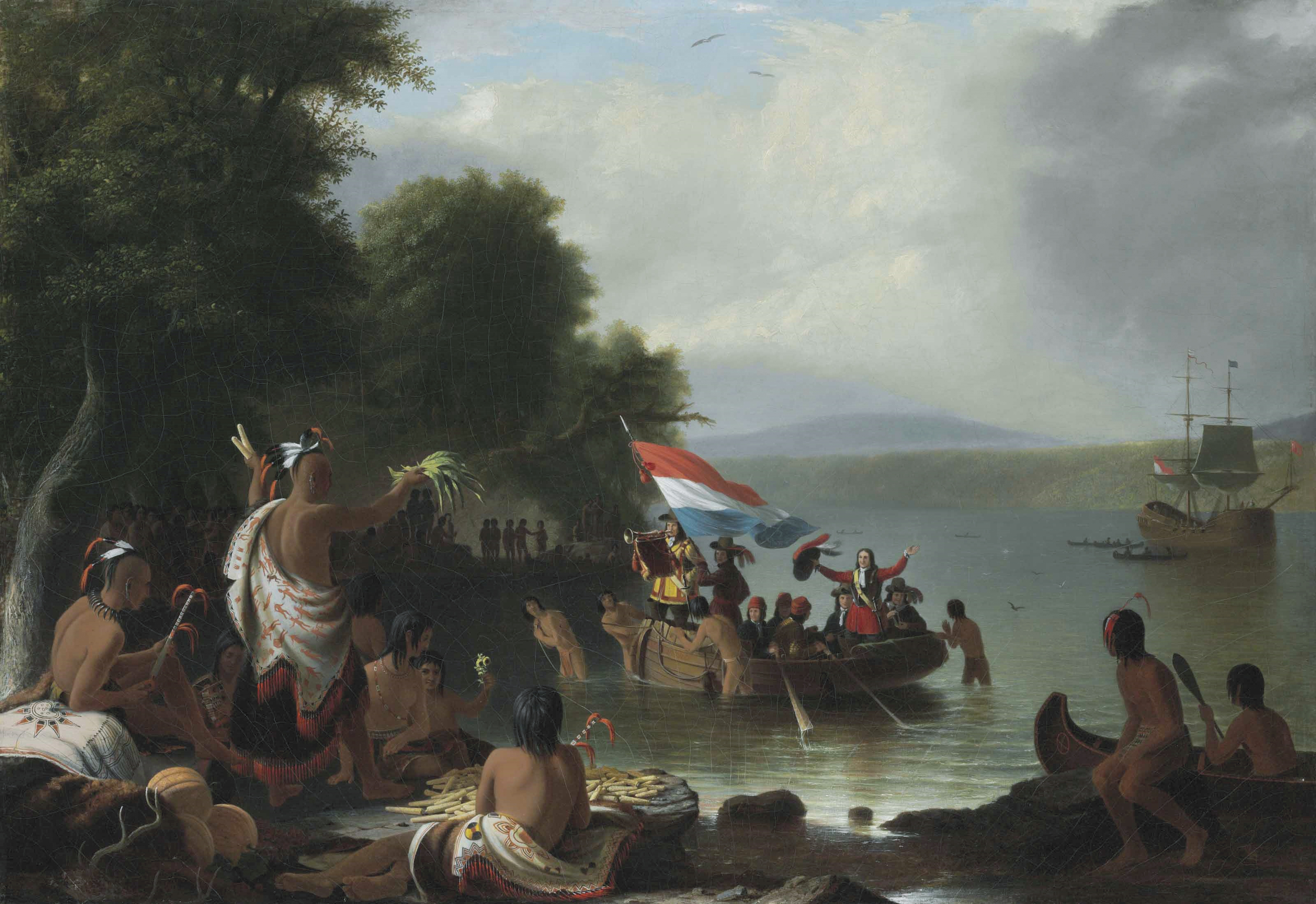
Landing of Henry Hudson, 1835

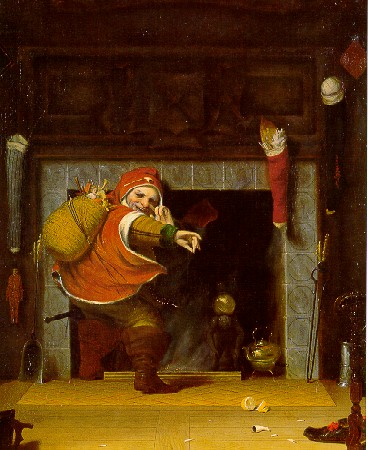
Saint Nicholas, 1837

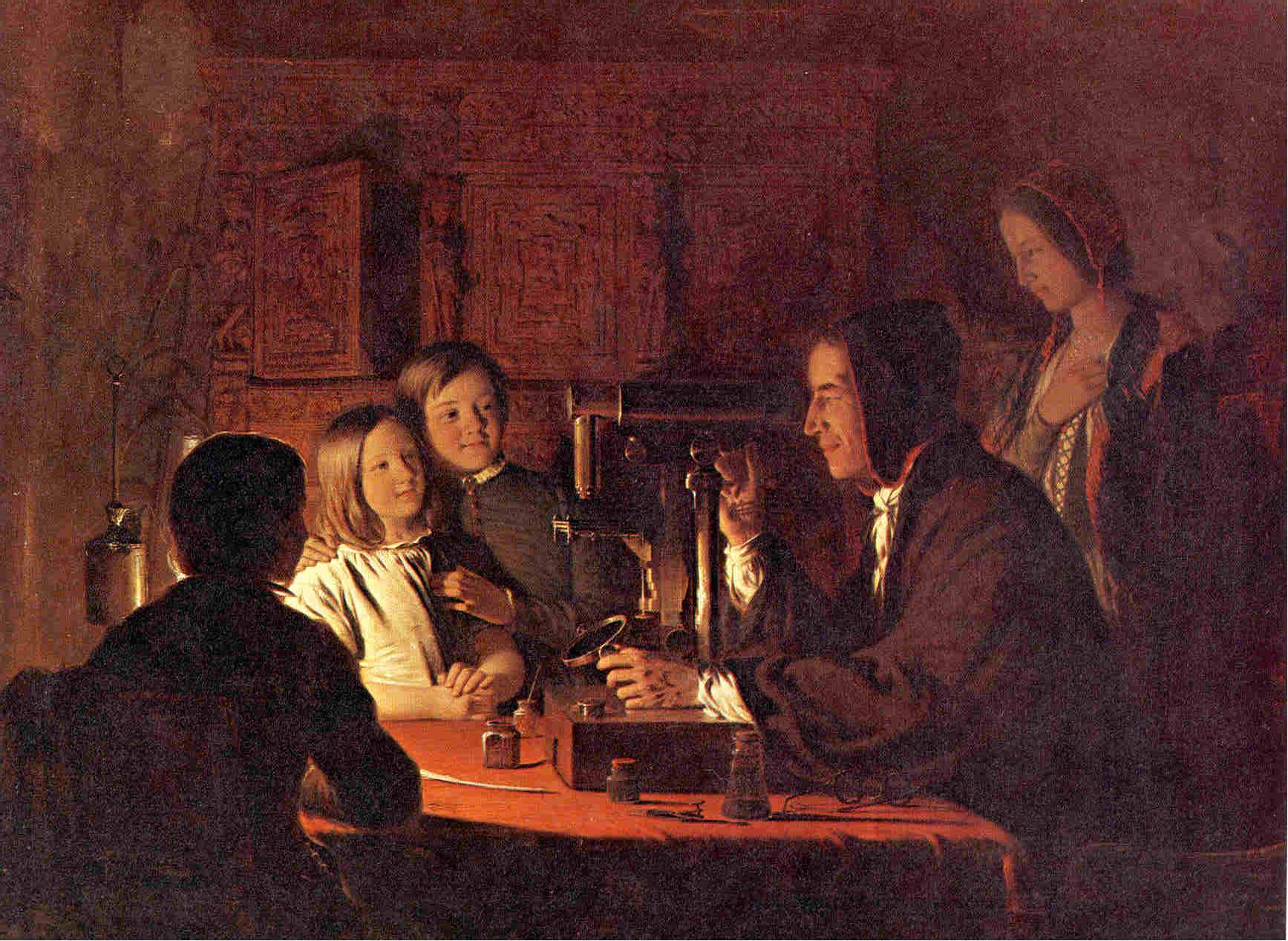
The Microscope, 1849

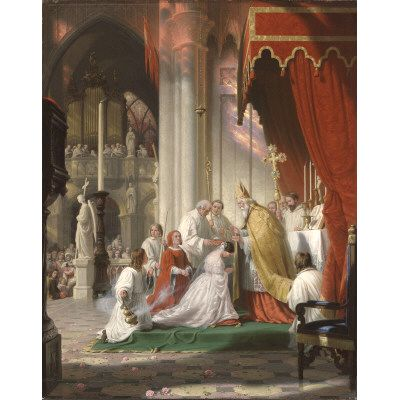
Taking the Veil, 1863

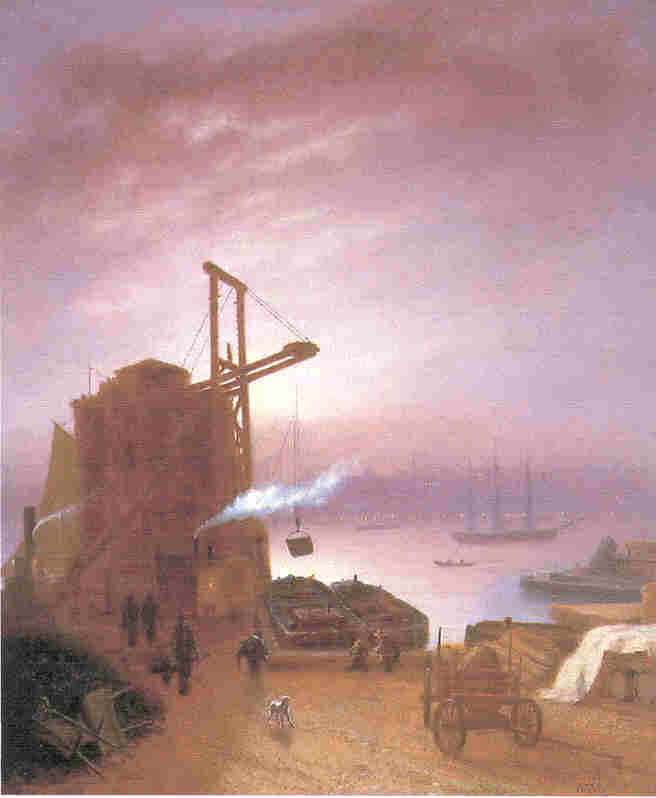
The Hudson River from Hoboken, 1878

== See also ==
- List of Hudson River School artists
