= William Weir =

William Weir may refer to:

- William Alexander Weir (1858–1929), Quebec lawyer and politician
- William Weir (architect) (1865–1950), Scottish restorer of historic buildings
- William Weir, 1st Viscount Weir (1877–1959), Scottish industrialist
- William Weir, 3rd Viscount Weir (born 1933), British peer and businessman
- William Gilbert Weir (1896–1971), Canadian politician
- Bill Weir (born 1967), co-anchor of Good Morning America Weekend Edition
- Bill Weir (footballer), Australian rules footballer
- William Weir (aviator) (1891–1917), World War I flying ace
- William Weir (trade unionist) (1868–1926), British coal miner and politician
- William Weir (businessman) (1823–1905), Scottish-Canadian businessman and banker
- Dr. William Weir, fictional character in Event Horizon (film)
