= Tazewell, Tennessee =

- Town
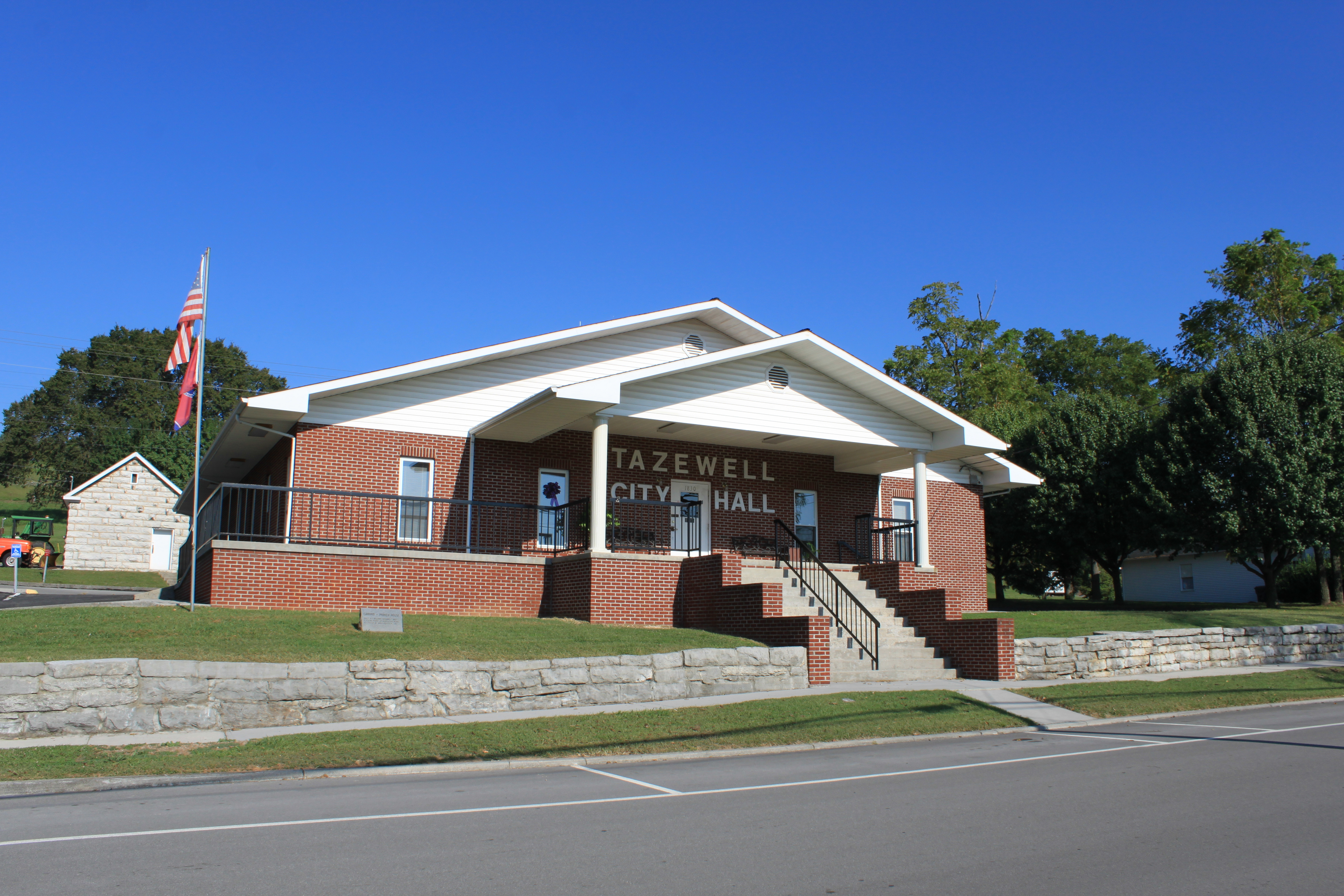
- Tazewell Town Hall

- Location of Tazewell in Claiborne County, Tennessee.
- Coordinates: 36°27′16″N 83°34′16″W
- Country: United States
- State: Tennessee
- County: Claiborne
- Incorporated: 1801
- Named for: Tazewell, Virginia

Government
  - Type: Mayor-council
  - Mayor: William R.(Bill) Fannon
  - Town Council: List of Aldermen: Jo-Ann Bunch; Rusty DeBusk; Patrick Hurley; Johnny Ramsey; Betsy Shoffner; Don Smith; The town has a full time 13 person police department with 24/7 coverage as of 2022. The town shares a fire department (Tazewell/New Tazewell Fire Department with neighboring twin city New Tazewell.

Area
  - Total: 4.34 sq mi (11.24 km^{2})
  - Land: 4.34 sq mi (11.24 km^{2})
  - Water: 0 sq mi (0.00 km^{2})
- Elevation: 1,365 ft (416 m)

Population (2020)
  - Total: 2,348
  - Density: 540.9/sq mi (208.85/km^{2})
- Time zone: UTC-5 (Eastern (EST))
  - Summer (DST): UTC-4 (EDT)
- ZIP code: 37879
- Area code: 423
- FIPS code: 47-73120
- GNIS feature ID: 1272257

Tazewell is a town in and the county seat of Claiborne County, Tennessee, United States. The population was 2,165 at the 2000 census, 2,218 at the 2010 census, and 2,348 at the 2020 census. The town is named for Tazewell, Virginia, which itself was named for Henry Tazewell (1753–1799), a U.S. senator from Virginia.

== History ==
In 1750, Dr. Thomas Walker of Virginia publicized the location of Cumberland Gap, which brought a stream of long hunters down the Clinch and Powell valleys into what is now Claiborne County. The land at the time was part of Cherokee and Shawnee hunting grounds, and hostile attacks by members of these two tribes were not uncommon. To protect themselves, hunters, fur traders and early settlers erected a series of small forts and stations along the Powell and Clinch valleys. One such station, known as Fort Butler, was located just west of modern Tazewell.

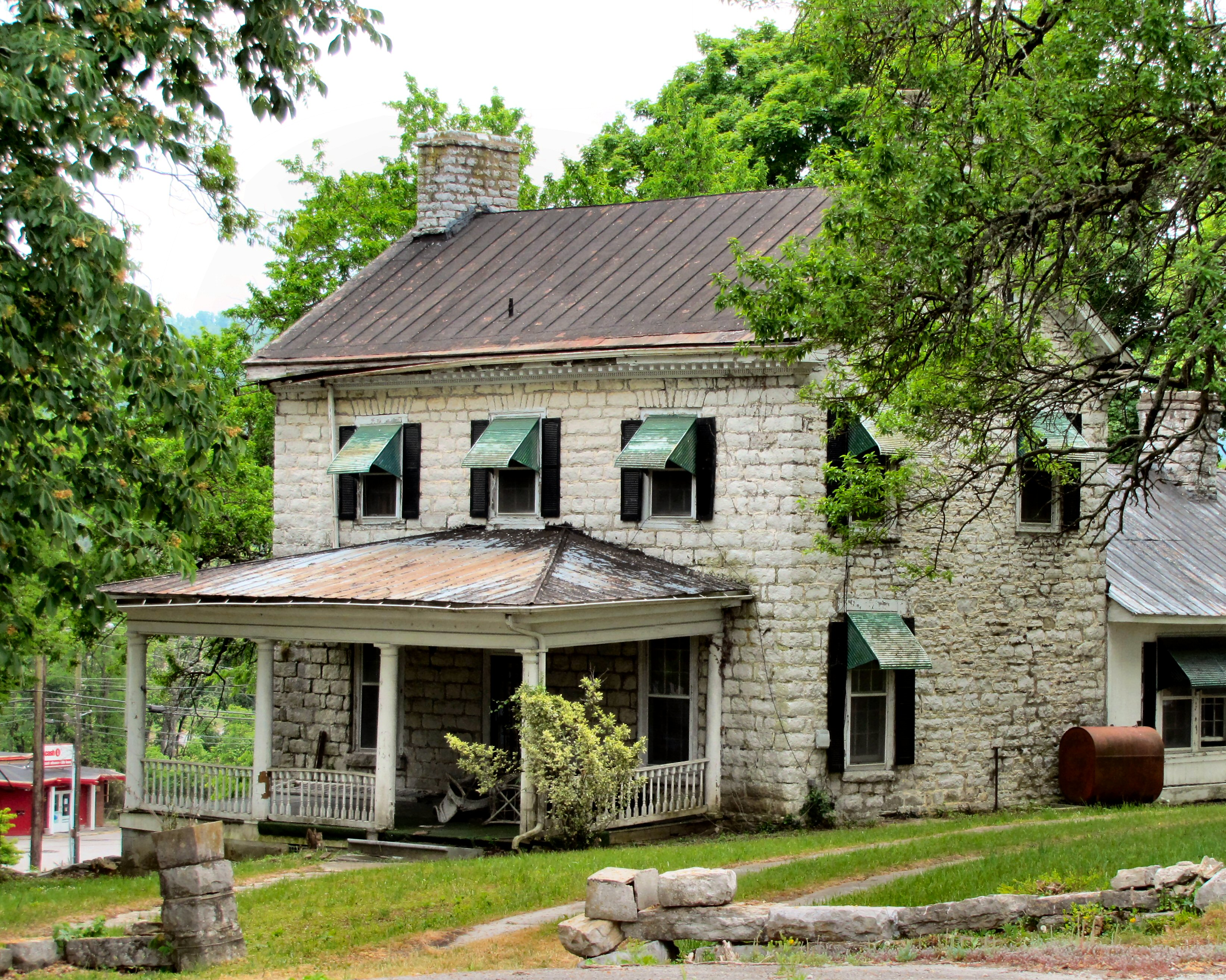
The Graham-Kivett House, built c. 1810

Among the earliest settlers in the Tazewell area was John Hunt (1750–1822), a militia captain who would later be instrumental in the founding of Huntsville, Alabama. In 1804, three years after the creation of Claiborne County, Tazewell was chosen as the county seat due in part to Hunt's influence (although a local legend states that the residents of Tazewell's rival for the seat, Springdale, were too intoxicated to vote on the day of selection). Hunt was named the county's first sheriff, and the government met at his house until a courthouse was constructed. The original courthouse was a wooden structure which had hitching posts for horses in front.

In 1862, at the height of the Civil War, Confederate troops occupied Tazewell as part of the greater struggle for the strategic Cumberland Gap. When the Confederates evacuated the town in November of that year, a fire followed, destroying much of Tazewell. The town retains a number of historical structures, mostly from the Victorian era, including a historic jail, built in 1819.

In 1890, plans developed for a railroad through the town, connecting nearby Cumberland Gap to Knoxville Residents protested the construction of a train depot, which led to the re-routing of the railroad and establishment of a depot several miles west, still bearing the name of the town. The area around the depot saw the birth of a new town, with businesses and homes propping in its vicinity. This town would later incorporate into what is now the city of New Tazewell.

In the early years of its incorporation, a rivalry began between the two communities, often over development projects choosing to start up in the area. In the 2000s, the rivalry subsided, and efforts to merge the two communities into one municipality were proposed, but were rejected.

== Geography ==
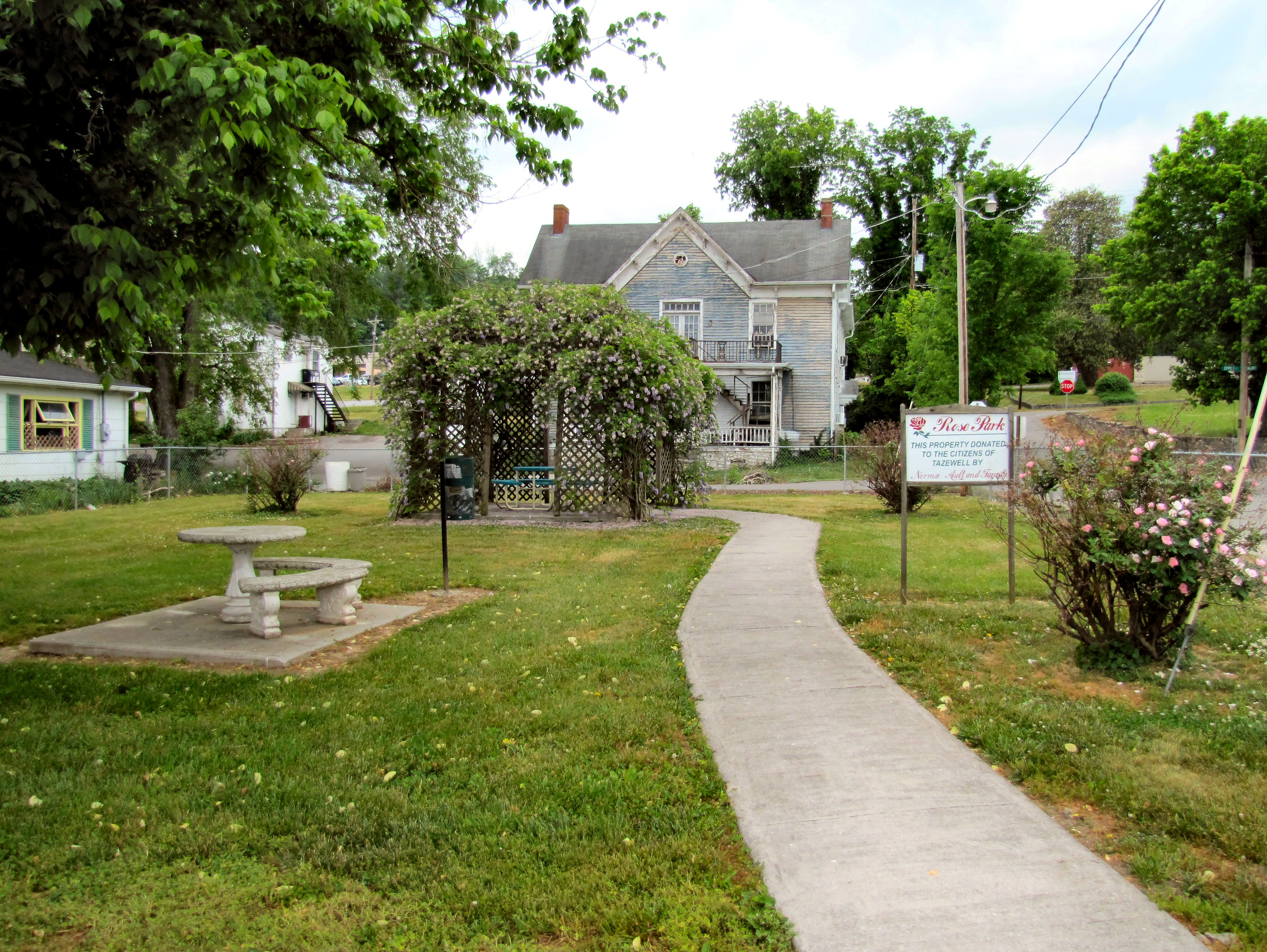
Rose Park

Tazewell is located at 36°27′16″N 83°34′16″W (36.454408, -83.571074). The town is situated on the northern slope of Wallen Ridge, the northernmost of a series of long, narrow ridges that comprise the Ridge and Valley Province of the Appalachian Mountains. Big Barren Creek rises in the western section of Tazewell and flows southwestward for approximately 10 miles (16 km) before emptying into the Norris Lake impoundment of the Clinch River. The streams in the eastern section of Tazewell are part of the watershed of the Powell River, a Clinch tributary that flows westward a few miles north of Tazewell.

Tazewell is centered just east of the junction of US 25E, which connects the town to Morristown to the southeast and Middlesboro, Kentucky to the north, and SR 33, which connects the town to Maynardville to the southwest and Sneedville and the upper Clinch Valley to the northeast.

According to the United States Census Bureau, the town has a total area of 4.4 square miles (11 km^{2}), all land.

=== Climate ===
Climate data for Tazewell, Tennessee (1991–2020 normals, extremes 1966–present)
| Month | Jan | Feb | Mar | Apr | May | Jun | Jul | Aug | Sep | Oct | Nov | Dec | Year |
|---|---|---|---|---|---|---|---|---|---|---|---|---|---|
| Record high °F (°C) | 75 (24) | 79 (26) | 85 (29) | 90 (32) | 91 (33) | 103 (39) | 103 (39) | 102 (39) | 96 (36) | 91 (33) | 82 (28) | 78 (26) | 103 (39) |
| Mean daily maximum °F (°C) | 43.9 (6.6) | 48.3 (9.1) | 57.3 (14.1) | 67.5 (19.7) | 75.1 (23.9) | 81.9 (27.7) | 84.7 (29.3) | 84.2 (29.0) | 79.4 (26.3) | 68.9 (20.5) | 57.1 (13.9) | 47.2 (8.4) | 66.3 (19.1) |
| Daily mean °F (°C) | 33.3 (0.7) | 37.0 (2.8) | 44.4 (6.9) | 53.5 (11.9) | 62.6 (17.0) | 70.3 (21.3) | 74.0 (23.3) | 73.0 (22.8) | 67.1 (19.5) | 55.2 (12.9) | 43.9 (6.6) | 36.6 (2.6) | 54.2 (12.3) |
| Mean daily minimum °F (°C) | 22.8 (−5.1) | 25.6 (−3.6) | 31.5 (−0.3) | 39.6 (4.2) | 50.0 (10.0) | 58.8 (14.9) | 63.3 (17.4) | 61.8 (16.6) | 54.7 (12.6) | 41.4 (5.2) | 30.7 (−0.7) | 26.1 (−3.3) | 42.2 (5.7) |
| Record low °F (°C) | −24 (−31) | −22 (−30) | −10 (−23) | 18 (−8) | 25 (−4) | 28 (−2) | 41 (5) | 42 (6) | 29 (−2) | 18 (−8) | 6 (−14) | −8 (−22) | −24 (−31) |
| Average precipitation inches (mm) | 4.73 (120) | 5.06 (129) | 5.25 (133) | 5.30 (135) | 4.23 (107) | 5.04 (128) | 5.24 (133) | 3.84 (98) | 3.78 (96) | 3.08 (78) | 3.81 (97) | 5.32 (135) | 54.68 (1,389) |
| Average snowfall inches (cm) | 2.6 (6.6) | 3.0 (7.6) | 0.6 (1.5) | 0.1 (0.25) | 0.0 (0.0) | 0.0 (0.0) | 0.0 (0.0) | 0.0 (0.0) | 0.0 (0.0) | 0.1 (0.25) | 0.1 (0.25) | 1.4 (3.6) | 7.9 (20) |
| Average precipitation days (≥ 0.01 in) | 13.7 | 13.8 | 14.6 | 12.9 | 13.2 | 13.3 | 13.5 | 11.1 | 9.9 | 10.0 | 10.8 | 14.5 | 151.3 |
| Average snowy days (≥ 0.1 in) | 2.1 | 2.2 | 0.8 | 0.1 | 0.0 | 0.0 | 0.0 | 0.0 | 0.0 | 0.0 | 0.1 | 1.2 | 6.5 |
Source: NOAA

== Demographics ==
Historical population
| Census | Pop. | Note | %± |
|---|---|---|---|
| 1870 | 345 | | — |
| 1880 | 342 | | −0.9% |
| 1910 | 886 | | — |
| 1920 | 424 | | −52.1% |
| 1960 | 1,264 | | — |
| 1970 | 1,860 | | 47.2% |
| 1980 | 2,090 | | 12.4% |
| 1990 | 2,150 | | 2.9% |
| 2000 | 2,165 | | 0.7% |
| 2010 | 2,218 | | 2.4% |
| 2020 | 2,348 | | 5.9% |

=== 2020 census ===
Tazewell racial composition
| Race | Number | Percentage |
|---|---|---|
| White (non-Hispanic) | 2,151 | 91.61% |
| Black or African American (non-Hispanic) | 55 | 2.34% |
| Native American | 5 | 0.21% |
| Asian | 3 | 0.13% |
| Pacific Islander | 1 | 0.04% |
| Other/Mixed | 66 | 2.81% |
| Hispanic or Latino | 67 | 2.85% |

As of the 2020 United States census, there were 2,348 people, 1,022 households, and 630 families residing in the town.

=== 2000 census ===
As of the census of 2000, there were 2,165 people, 918 households, and 588 families residing in the town. The population density was 496.0 inhabitants per square mile (191.5/km^{2}). There were 987 housing units at an average density of 226.1 per square mile (87.3/km^{2}). The racial makeup of the town was 94.00% White, 4.02% African American, 0.42% Native American, 0.60% Asian, 0.05% Pacific Islander, 0.05% from other races, and 0.88% from two or more races. Hispanic or Latino of any race were 0.74% of the population.

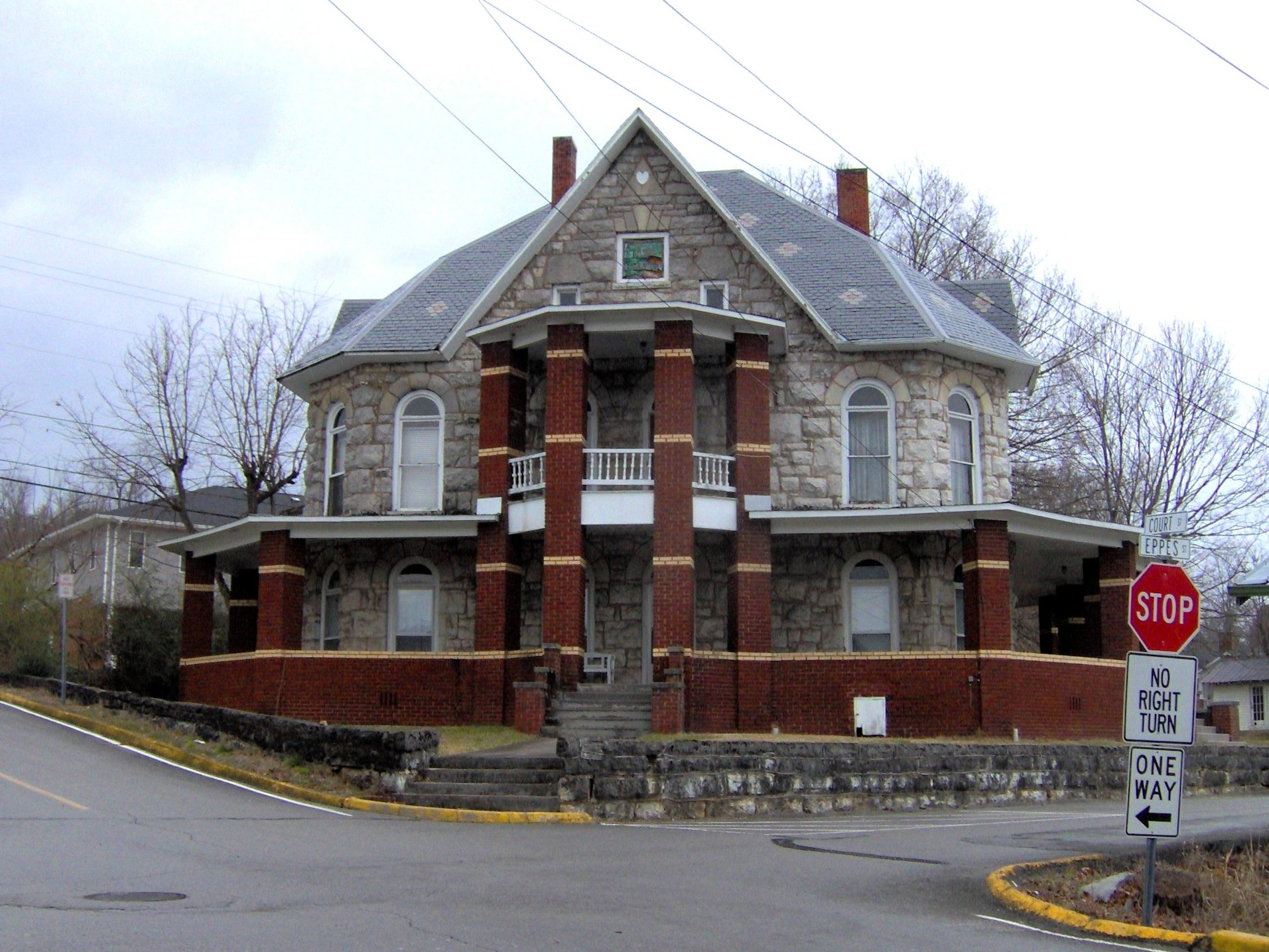
The Buis-Stone house built by Nelson Stone in Tazewell

There were 918 households, out of which 27.2% had children under the age of 18 living with them, 44.7% were married couples living together, 16.3% had a female householder with no husband present, and 35.9% were non-families. 32.0% of all households were made up of individuals, and 14.1% had someone living alone who was 65 years of age or older. The average household size was 2.20 and the average family size was 2.73.

In the town, the population was spread out, with 19.4% under the age of 18, 9.4% from 18 to 24, 26.2% from 25 to 44, 25.6% from 45 to 64, and 19.4% who were 65 years of age or older. The median age was 41 years. For every 100 females, there were 82.4 males. For every 100 females age 18 and over, there were 79.8 males.

The median income for a household in the town was $22,288, and the median income for a family was $32,813. Males had a median income of $25,721 versus $19,479 for females. The per capita income for the town was $16,688. About 20.0% of families and 22.2% of the population were below the poverty line, including 29.9% of those under age 18 and 19.9% of those age 65 or over.

== Notable people ==
- Boyd C. Fugate, State Representative (1884-1967)
- Margaret Burns Fugate, Trustee U.S. Bankruptcy Court, Eastern District of Tennessee, 10.0 Avvo Rating: highest possible rating for legal ability and ethical standards

== Education ==
- Satellite campus of Walters State Community College
- Claiborne High School
- Soldiers Memorial Middle School
- Tazewell-New Tazewell Primary School
- AliYah Academy
- Springdale Elementary School
