= Andy Weir (footballer) =

Scottish footballer

Personal information
- Full name: Andrew Best Weir
- Date of birth: 15 November 1937
- Place of birth: Paisley, Scotland
- Date of death: 1992 (aged 54–55)
- Height: 1.68 m (5 ft 6 in)
- Position: Winger

Senior career*
Years	Team	Apps	(Gls)
- Arthurlie
1957–1968	Motherwell	202	(44)

International career
1959–1960	Scotland	6	(1)
1959–1960	Scotland U23	3	(0)
1960	Scottish Football League XI	1	(0)
1962	SFA trial v SFL	1	(0)
- * Club domestic league appearances and goals

Andrew Best Weir (15 November 1937 – 1992) was a Scottish footballer who played as a winger for Motherwell and the Scotland national team. He earned a total of six caps for Scotland and scored his only goal on his debut, a 3–2 win against West Germany in 1959. His final international appearance was against Turkey in 1960.

Weir developed meningitis in 1961 which led to him being in a coma for five days in Ruchill Hospital, it was said that "only his high level of physical fitness helped him shake off the illness and survive". A back injury shortly afterwards led to the end of his career. Despite 10 years at Motherwell which saw him score 57 major competition goals in 272 games, Weir was not given a benefit match; however fans of the club held a dance in his name and presented him with a "thank you" cheque worth, in his words "a lot of money".

Weir had nine children with his wife Margaret, and continued to stay in Ferguslie Park in Paisley before moving to Elderslie in the 1970s where he died on 11 May 1992, having been in poor health for some years.

== See also ==
- List of one-club men in association football
