= Andrew Weir, 1st Baron Inverforth =

Scottish shipowner (1865–1955)

The Right Honourable The Lord Inverforth PC

Minister of Munitions
- In office 10 January 1919 – 21 March 1921
- Prime Minister: David Lloyd George
- Preceded by: Winston Churchill
- Succeeded by: Office abolished

Member of the House of Lords
- Lord Temporal
- In office 5 February 1919 – 17 September 1955
- Preceded by: Peerage created
- Succeeded by: Andrew Alexander Morton Weir, 2nd Baron Inverforth

Personal details
- Born: 24 April 1865
- Died: 17 September 1955 (aged 90)
- Occupation: shipowner

Andrew Weir, 1st Baron Inverforth, PC (24 April 1865 – 17 September 1955) created and headed the firm of Andrew Weir and Co. shipowners of Glasgow. In the First World War he served as a minister in the coalition government: he was Surveyor General of Supplies from 1917 to 1919, and Minister of Munitions from 1919 to 1921.

== Life ==
Andrew Weir was born in Kirkcaldy, Fife the eldest son of William Weir and his wife Janet. Both William Weir and his father were cork merchants. Weir married Anne Dowie (d. 1941) in 1889, daughter of Thomas Kay Dowie. They had five daughters and one son, all born between 1891 and 1902.

After attending the Kirkcaldy High School, Andrew went to work for the Commercial Bank of Scotland. He soon moved to Glasgow. Shortly after his twentieth birthday, he bought a sailing ship, the barque Willowbank, which he employed in the coasting trade. The next year Weir began building sailing ships of modern design and within a few years had built up a fleet of 52. In 1896 Weir moved to London and started converting his fleet from sail to steam. In 1905 he established the Bank Line, which became the leading British shipping line.

During the First World War in March 1917 Weir was asked to report on the commercial organization of the supply branches of the army. Weir recommended the appointment of a surveyor-general of supply, with a seat on the army council, to take over the task of supplying the army with all its stores and equipment other than munitions. His recommendations were accepted and he was given the job.

In January 1919, after the war had ended, he was appointed Minister of Munitions to close down the supply operation and dispose of unwanted materiel. He remained in office until March 1921. For his services Weir was raised to the peerage as Baron Inverforth, of Southgate in the County of Middlesex on 5 February 1919, and received the American Distinguished Service Medal.

After the war Lord Inverforth invested in diesel-powered ships. He also broadened his business interests, becoming involved in the Marconi group of companies. He was also chairman of the Anglo-Burma Rice Company and of the Wilmer Grain Company, and was also on the board of Lloyds Bank.

Inverforth continued to go to the office four days a week, into his ninety-first year. He died at his home, Inverforth House in Hampstead, on 17 September 1955..

== Arms ==
Coat of arms of Andrew Weir, 1st Baron Inverforth
Crest A dexter and sinister hand each couped at the wrist Proper supporting a lymphad as in the arms. Escutcheon Or on a fess Azure between in chief an escutcheon per bend sinister Azure and Gules charged with a bend Argent and in base a lymphad sail furled Sable pennons flying to the dexter Gules three mullets of the first. Supporters On either side a sailor of the Mercantile Marine Proper. Motto Per Laborem Ad Honorem (Through Toil To Honour)

== Biography ==
- G. K. S. Hamilton-Edwards, "Weir, Andrew, first Baron Inverforth (1865–1955)", rev., Oxford Dictionary of National Biography, Oxford University Press, 2004.

== Footnotes ==
Political offices
Preceded by Winston Churchill	Minister of Munitions; 1919–1921	Office abolished
Peerage of the United Kingdom
New creation	Baron Inverforth; 1919–1955	Succeeded by Andrew Alexander Morton Weir
