= Frank Weir (cricketer) =

New Zealand cricketer

Personal information
- Full name: Alison Francis Weir
- Born: 21 January 1903; Auckland, New Zealand
- Died: 17 June 1969 (aged 66); Auckland, New Zealand
- Source: ESPNcricinfo, 26 June 2016

Frank Weir (21 January 1903 – 17 June 1969) was a New Zealand cricketer. He played three first-class matches for Auckland in 1927/28.

== See also ==
- List of Auckland representative cricketers
