= Tennessee's 8th Senate district =

American legislative district

Tennessee's 8th State Senate district
Senator
Jessie Seal; R–New Tazewell
- Demographics: 91% White; 1% Black; 4% Hispanic; 1% Asian; 2% Multiracial
- Population (2022): 211,285

Tennessee's 8th Senate district is one of 33 districts in the Tennessee Senate. It has been represented by Republican Jessie Seal since 2024. It was previously held by Frank Niceley since 2012. It is currently the most Republican-leaning Senate district in the state.

== Geography ==
District 8 covers much of rural East Tennessee in between Knoxville and the Tri-Cities, including all of Claiborne, Grainger, Hancock, Jefferson, Union Counties, and part of Sevier County. Communities in the district include Jefferson City, Harrogate, Strawberry Plains, New Tazewell, Bean Station, Dandridge, Maynardville, Sneedville.

The district overlaps with Tennessee's 1st and 2nd congressional districts. It borders the states of Kentucky and Virginia.

== Recent election results ==
Tennessee Senators are elected to staggered four-year terms, with odd-numbered districts holding elections in midterm years and even-numbered districts holding elections in presidential years.

=== 2020 ===
2020 Tennessee Senate election, District 8
Party	Candidate	Votes	%
Republican	Frank Niceley (incumbent)	59,713	100
Total votes		59,713	100
Republican hold			

=== 2016 ===
2016 Tennessee Senate election, District 8
Party	Candidate	Votes	%
Republican	Frank Niceley (incumbent)	49,440	100
Total votes		49,440	100
Republican hold			

=== 2012 ===
2012 Tennessee Senate election, District 8
Primary election
Party	Candidate	Votes	%
Republican	Frank Niceley	7,021	44.6
Republican	Cynthia Bundren Jackson	5,432	34.5
Republican	Jeffrey Brantley	1,817	11.5
Republican	Hobart Rice	1,483	9.4
Total votes		15,753	100
General election
Republican	Frank Niceley	43,687	100
Total votes		43,687	100
Republican hold			

=== Federal and statewide results ===
Year	Office	Results
2020	President	Trump 81.8 – 17%
2016	President	Trump 80.0 – 16.9%
2012	President	Romney 73.9 – 24.5%
2012	Senate	Corker 76.8 – 19.2%
