= Bill Monroe and his Blue Grass Boys (1950–60) =

Compilation album by Bill Monroe and his Blue Grass Boys
- Released: October 1973
- Recorded: 1950–1959
- Genre: Bluegrass; gospel
- Length: 2:23:42
- Label: MCA
- Producer: Paul Cohen; Owen Bradley

Bill Monroe chronology
Father & Son (1973)	Bill Monroe and his Blue Grass Boys (1950–60) (1973)	Bean Blossom (1973)

Bill Monroe and his Blue Grass Boys (1950–60) is the first Japanese-exclusive compilation album by American bluegrass musician Bill Monroe and his band, the Blue Grass Boys. Released by MCA Records in October 1973, it contains four volumes of 14 songs each recorded between 1950 and 1959, all of which were previously released as singles, B-sides, or on other albums. The album preceded Monroe's band's first tour of Japan, which followed around a year later.

== Track listing ==
=== Disc one ===
Bill Monroe and his Blue Grass Boys (1950–60) disc one track listing
No.	Title	Writer(s)	Original release	Length
1.	"Brown County Breakdown" (recorded September 16, 1955)	Bill Monroe	Bluegrass Instrumentals (1965)	2:27
2.	"My Little Georgia Rose" (recorded June 26, 1954)	Monroe	The High, Lonesome Sound... (1966)	2:41
3.	"The Old Fiddler" (recorded April 8, 1950)	Hugh Ashley; Ira Wright	single A-side (1950)	2:35
4.	"Alabama Waltz" (recorded February 3, 1950)	Hank Williams	"The Old Fiddler" B-side (1950)	2:25
5.	"Boat of Love" (recorded April 8, 1950)	James W. Smith	single A-side (1950)	2:45
6.	"I'm Blue, I'm Lonesome" (recorded February 3, 1950)	James B. Smith	"Boat of Love" B-side (1950)	2:51
7.	"Memories of You" (recorded February 3, 1950)	James B. Smith	single A-side (1950)	2:57
8.	"Bluegrass Ramble" (recorded February 3, 1950)	Monroe	"Memories of You" B-side (1950)	2:13
9.	"When the Golden Leaves Begin to Fall" (recorded October 15, 1950)	Albert Price	single A-side (1950)	2:58
10.	"Poison Love" (recorded January 20, 1951)	Elmer Laird	single A-side (1951)	2:35
11.	"On the Old Kentucky Shore" (recorded January 20, 1951)	Monroe	"Poison Love" B-side (1951)	3:10
12.	"Lord Protect My Soul" (recorded October 15, 1950)	Monroe	single A-side (1951)	2:30
13.	"River of Death" (recorded October 15, 1950)	Monroe	"Lord Protect My Soul" B-side (1951)	2:30
14.	"The Prisoner's Song" (recorded March 17, 1951)	Guy Massey	single A-side (1951)	2:41
Total length:				37:18

=== Disc two ===
Bill Monroe and his Blue Grass Boys (1950–60) disc two track listing
No.	Title	Writer(s)	Original release	Length
1.	"Rotation Blues" (recorded July 1, 1951)	Stewart Powell	single A-side (1952)	2:56
2.	"Lonesome Truck Driver's Blues" (recorded July 1, 1951)	Lee Roberts	"Rotation Blues" B-side (1952)	2:54
3.	"Get Down on Your Knees and Pray" (recorded July 6, 1951)	Monroe	"I'll Meet You in Church Sunday Morning" B-side (1951)	2:58
4.	"My Dying Bed" (recorded July 18, 1952)	Price	The High, Lonesome Sound... (1966)	2:48
5.	"Sugar Coated Love" (recorded July 6, 1951)	Audrey Butler	"Highway of Sorrow" B-side (1951)	2:22
6.	"Highway of Sorrow" (recorded April 23, 1951)	Monroe; Pete Pyle	single A-side (1951)	2:54
7.	"Travelin' Blues" (recorded March 29, 1951)	Jimmie Rodgers; Shelly Lee Alley	single A-side (1951)	2:53
8.	"The First Whippoorwill" (recorded October 28, 1951)	Monroe	"Christmas Time's A-Comin'" B-side (1951)	2:50
9.	"Christmas Time's A-Comin'" (recorded October 28, 1951)	Tex Logan	single A-side (1951)	2:41
10.	"Rawhide" (recorded January 20, 1951)	Monroe	"Letter from My Darlin'" B-side (1952)	2:32
11.	"Letter from My Darling" (recorded January 20, 1951)	Monroe	single A-side (1952)	3:07
12.	"A Mighty Pretty Waltz" (recorded July 26, 1952)	Al Hoffman; Norman Gimbel	single A-side (1952)	2:42
13.	"In the Pines" (recorded July 18, 1952)	Jimmie Davis; Monroe	"Footprints in the Snow" B-side (1952)	3:08
14.	"You're Drifting Away" (recorded July 6, 1951)	Monroe	"Walking in Jerusalem" B-side (1953)	2:31
Total length:				39:16

=== Disc three ===
Bill Monroe and his Blue Grass Boys (1950–60) disc three track listing
No.	Title	Writer(s)	Original release	Length
1.	"Cabin of Love" (recorded July 6, 1951)	Burch Monroe	"Country Waltz" B-side (1953)	2:40
2.	"Country Waltz" (recorded July 18, 1952)	Bill Monroe; Claude V. Breland	single A-side (1953)	2:24
3.	"Memories of Mother and Dad" (recorded July 18, 1952)	Price	"The Little Girl and the Dreadful Snake" B-side (1954)	2:54
4.	"I Hope You Have Learned" (recorded November 28, 1953)	Bill Carrigan; Eugene Butler	"Wishing Waltz" B-side (1954)	2:28
5.	"Wishing Waltz" (recorded November 28, 1953)	Gene Evans	single A-side (1954)	2:37
6.	"Changing Partners" (recorded January 8, 1954)	Joe Darion; Larry Coleman	single A-side (1954)	2:15
7.	"Get Up John" (recorded November 28, 1953)	Bill Monroe	"Whitehouse Blues" B-side (1954)	2:08
8.	"Whitehouse Blues" (recorded January 7, 1954)	Wilbur Jones	single A-side (1954)	2:09
9.	"He Will Set Your Fields on Fire" (recorded January 14, 1954)	Jones	"Happy on My Way" B-side (1954)	2:38
10.	"Happy on My Way" (recorded January 14, 1954)	Pyle	single A-side (1954)	2:11
11.	"Plant Some Flowers by My Grave" (recorded January 8, 1954)	Jimmie Davis; Rupert McClendon	My All Time Country Favorites (1962)	2:40
12.	"A Voice from on High" (recorded January 14, 1954)	Bill Monroe; Bessie Lee Mauldin	"I'm Working on a Building" B-side (1954)	2:34
13.	"Roanoke" (recorded December 31, 1954)	Bill Monroe	"Cheyenne" B-side (1955)	2:36
14.	"Wait a Little Longer, Please Jesus" (recorded January 28, 1955)	Hazel Houser	single A-side (1955)	2:34
Total length:				34:48

=== Disc four ===
Bill Monroe and his Blue Grass Boys (1950–60) disc four track listing
No.	Title	Writer(s)	Original release	Length
1.	"Let the Light Shine Down on Me" (recorded January 28, 1955)	Dot Swan	"Wait a Little Longer, Please Jesus" B-side (1955)	1:55
2.	"On and On" (recorded January 7, 1954)	Bill Monroe	single A-side (1956)	2:44
3.	"Tall Timber" (recorded September 16, 1955)	Bill Monroe	Bluegrass Instrumentals (1965)	2:22
4.	"I Believed in You Darling" (recorded January 7, 1954)	Bill Monroe	"On and On" B-side (1956)	2:38
5.	"Sitting Alone in the Moonlight" (recorded January 8, 1954)	Bill Monroe	"You'll Find Her Name Written There" B-side (1957)	2:29
6.	"Four Walls" (recorded April 20, 1957)	Marvin Moore; George Campbell	single A-side (1957)	2:20
7.	"Scotland" (recorded April 8, 1958)	Bill Monroe	"Panhandle Country" B-side (1958)	1:55
8.	"Panhandle Country" (recorded April 8, 1958)	Bill Monroe	single A-side (1958)	2:02
9.	"Dark as the Night, Blue as the Day" (recorded January 30, 1959)	Bill Monroe	single A-side (1959)	2:30
10.	"Come Go with Me" (recorded November 25, 1959)	Marty Robbins	"Lonesome Wind Blues" B-side (1959)	2:47
11.	"Lonesome Wind Blues" (recorded November 25, 1959)	Wayne Raney	single A-side (1959)	2:10
12.	"Big Mon" (recorded December 1, 1958)	Bill Monroe	Bluegrass Instrumentals (1965)	2:16
13.	"Monroe's Hornpipe" (recorded December 1, 1958)	Bill Monroe	Bluegrass Instrumentals (1965)	1:58
14.	"Y'all Come" (recorded January 8, 1954)	Arlie Duff	"Changing Partners" B-side (1954)	2:14
Total length:				32:20

== Personnel ==
Disc one personnel

- Bill Monroe — mandolin, vocals (lead on tracks 2–4, 6, 9 and 14; tenor on tracks 5–7 and 9–13)
- Charlie Cline — guitar (track 1), fiddle (track 2)
- Edd Mayfield — guitar (track 2)
- Jimmy Martin — guitar (tracks 3–13), lead vocals (tracks 5–7 and 9–13)
- Grady Martin — guitar (track 14)
- Jimmie Selph — guitar (track 14)
- Joe Stuart — banjo (track 1)
- Jim Smoak — banjo (track 2)
- Rudy Lyle — banjo (tracks 3–11), baritone vocals (tracks 12 and 13)
- Vassar Clements — fiddle (tracks 1 and 3–8)
- Bobby Hicks — fiddle (track 1)
- Merle "Red" Taylor — fiddle (tracks 2 and 9–11)
- Gordon Terry — fiddle (track 2)
- Tommy Jackson — fiddle (track 14)
- Bessie Lee Mauldin — string bass (track 1)
- Ernie Newton — string bass (tracks 2 and 14)
- Joel Price — string bass (tracks 3–11), vocals (baritone on tracks 5 and 9; bass on tracks 12 and 13)
- Birch Monroe — bass vocals (track 5)
- Owen Bradley — organ/piano (track 14)
- Ferris Coursey — drums (track 14)

Disc two personnel

- Bill Monroe — mandolin, vocals (lead on tracks 1, 2, 6, 7, 9 and 12; tenor on tracks 3–5, 8, 9, 11, 13 and 14)
- Carter Stanley — guitar (tracks 1–3, 5 and 14), lead vocals (tracks 3, 5 and 14)
- Jimmy Martin — guitar (tracks 4, 7 and 10–13), lead vocals (tracks 3, 11 and 13)
- Grady Martin — guitar (track 6)
- Loren "Jack" Shook — guitar (track 6)
- Edd Mayfield — guitar and lead vocals (tracks 8 and 9)
- Rudy Lyle — banjo (tracks 1–3, 5–7, 10, 11 and 14), baritone vocals (tracks 3 and 14)
- Sonny Osborne — banjo (tracks 4, 12 and 13)
- James "Gar" Bowers — banjo (tracks 8 and 9)
- Gordon Terry — fiddle (tracks 1–3, 5, 8, 9 and 14), bass vocals (tracks 3 and 14)
- Charlie Cline — fiddle (tracks 4, 12 and 13)
- James "Hal" Smith — fiddle (tracks 6 and 7)
- Merle "Red" Taylor — fiddle (tracks 10 and 11)
- Ernie Newton — string bass (tracks 1, 2, 4, 6, 12 and 13)
- Howard "Cedric Rainwater" Watts — string bass (tracks 3, 5 and 14)
- Joel Price — string bass (tracks 7, 10 and 11)
- Oscar "Shorty" Shehan — string bass (tracks 8 and 9)
- Ferris Coursey — drums (track 6)
- Owen Bradley — vibraphone (track 9), piano (track 12)

Disc three personnel

- Bill Monroe — mandolin, vocals (lead on tracks 2, 5, 6, 8, 11 and 14; tenor on tracks 1, 3, 4, 9, 10, 12 and 14)
- Carter Stanley — guitar and lead vocals (track 1)
- Jimmy Martin — guitar (tracks 2–12), lead vocals (tracks 3, 4, 9, 10 and 12)
- Grady Martin — guitar (tracks 6 and 8–12)
- Claude "Jackie" Phelps — guitar (tracks 13 and 14), lead vocals (track 14)
- Rudy Lyle — banjo (tracks 1 and 4–12)
- Sonny Osborne — banjo (tracks 2 and 3)
- Hubert Davis — banjo (track 13)
- Gordon Terry — fiddle (track 1)
- Charlie Cline — fiddle (tracks 2–14), baritone vocals (tracks 9, 10, 12 and 14)
- Bobby Hicks — fiddle (tracks 13 and 14), bass vocals (track 14)
- Howard "Cedric Rainwater" Watts — string bass (track 1)
- Ernie Newton — string bass (tracks 2–13)
- William "Buddy" Killen — string bass (track 14)
- Milton Estes — bass vocals (tracks 9 and 10)

Disc four personnel

- Bill Monroe — mandolin, vocals (lead on tracks 6 and 9–11; tenor on tracks 1, 2, 4, 5 and 14)
- Claude "Jackie" Phelps — guitar and lead vocals (track 1)
- Jimmy Martin — guitar and lead vocals (tracks 2, 4, 5 and 14)
- Grady Martin — guitar (tracks 5 and 14)
- Joe Stuart — guitar (track 6), banjo (track 3)
- Edd Mayfield — guitar (tracks 7 and 8)
- Vernon "Jack" Cooke — guitar (tracks 9–13)
- Rudy Lyle — banjo (tracks 2, 4, 5 and 14)
- Don Stover — banjo (track 6)
- Joe Drumright — banjo (tracks 7, 8, 10 and 11)
- Robert "Buddy" Pennington — banjo (tracks 9, 12 and 13)
- Charlie Cline — fiddle (tracks 1, 2, 4, 5 and 14), guitar (track 3), baritone vocals (tracks 1, 2 and 4)
- Bobby Hicks — fiddle (tracks 1, 3, 7–9, 12 and 13), bass vocals (track 1)
- Gordon Terry — fiddle (tracks 3 and 6)
- Tommy Jackson — fiddle (track 6)
- Kenny Baker — fiddle (tracks 7 and 8)
- Charlie Smith — fiddle (track 9)
- Dale Potter — fiddle (tracks 10 and 11)
- William "Buddy" Killen — string bass (track 1)
- Ernie Newton — string bass (tracks 2, 4, 5 and 14)
- Bessie Lee Mauldin — string bass (tracks 3 and 6–13)
