= WCXZ =

- Harrogate, Tennessee; United States
- Broadcast area: Harrogate, Tennessee; Middlesboro, Kentucky
- Frequency: 740 kHz
- Branding: "74 WCXZ"

Programming
- Format: Country; Bluegrass; Americana

Ownership
- Owner: Lincoln Memorial University
- Sister stations: WLMU

History
- First air date: 1980
- Former call signs: WSVQ (1980–1994); WRWB (1994–2007)
- Call sign meaning: W Country X (crossover) Zone

Technical information
- Licensing authority: FCC
- Facility ID: 52626
- Class: D
- Power: 900 watts daytime 7 watts nighttime
- Transmitter coordinates: 36°33′40.0″N 83°39′21.0″W

Links
- Public license information: Public file; LMS

WCXZ (740 AM) is a radio station licensed to serve Harrogate, Tennessee, United States. The station is owned by Lincoln Memorial University, a private four-year co-educational liberal arts college.

It broadcasts a Country/Bluegrass/Americana format to the Harrogate, Tennessee and Middlesboro, Kentucky area.

== History ==
The new station was assigned the call letters WSVQ by the Federal Communications Commission (FCC) on October 20, 1980, and signed on November 17, 1980. WSVQ received its license to cover from the FCC on January 8, 1981.

In June 1986, Appalachian Communications reached an agreement to sell this station to Pine Hills of Tennessee, Inc. The deal was approved by the FCC on July 15, 1986, and the transaction was consummated on September 2, 1986.

The station was assigned new call letters WRWB by the FCC on July 5, 1994.

From February 1997 to February 2007, WRWB was operated by Lincoln Memorial University as part of the Sigmon Communications Center under a time brokerage agreement with license holder Pine Hills of Tennessee, Inc. The agreement stipulated that Pine Hills would apply, at the university's expense, to have the station's callsign changed to "WLMU" to match LMU's existing non-commercial FM station, WLMU (which would have become "WLMU-FM"), but FCC records show no such application was ever made.

In July 2007, Pine Hills of Tennessee, Inc., reached an agreement to sell this station outright to Lincoln Memorial University. The deal was approved by the FCC on February 8, 2008, and the transaction was consummated on March 28, 2008.

The station was assigned the current WCXZ call letters by the FCC on December 14, 2007.
