= Sean McDermott (baseball) =

American baseball coach

Current position
- Title: Head coach
- Team: UIC
- Conference: Missouri Valley
- Record: 134–132–1 (.504)

Playing career
- 1989–1990: Indian Hills CC
- 1991–1992: Lincoln Memorial
- Position: Shortstop

Coaching career (HC unless noted)
- 1993: Lincoln Memorial (GA)
- 1994: J. Frank White Academy
- 1995: Princeton (asst.)
- 1996–1998: Viterbo
- 1999–2021: UIC (AHC/INF/RC)
- 2022–present: UIC

Head coaching record
- Overall: 134–132–1 (.504) (NCAA) 74–72 (.507) (NAIA)
- Tournaments: NCAA: 0–2

Accomplishments and honors

Championships
- MVC regular season (2026); MVC tournament (2026)

Awards
- Missouri Valley Coach of the Year (2026)

Sean McDermott is a baseball coach and former shortstop, who is the current head baseball coach of the UIC Flames. He played college baseball at Indian Hills Community College from 1990 to 1991, before transferring to Lincoln Memorial from 1992–1993. He then served as the head coach of the Viterbo V-Hawks (1996–1998).

== Playing career ==
McDermott attended and played baseball at Indian Hills Community College. He transferred to Lincoln Memorial University. As a junior, he had 3 stolen bases in 5 attempts. His best season came as a senior, posting a .266 batting average, a .404 on-base percentage, 33 runs score, 40 walks and 11 stolen bases. He concluded his playing career with 40 walks, at the time a program record.

== Coaching career ==
Following the conclusion of his playing career, McDermott stayed around at Lincoln Memorial as a graduate assistant for a year, while finishing his degree. The following season he was the head baseball coach at the J. Frank White Academy. McDermott would land his first NCAA Division I coaching position in the fall of 1994, being named an assistant at Princeton. From 1996 to 1998, he served as the head coach of Viterbo University. He led them to a program records, 32 victories in just his second season. During the 1998 season, he led them to a berth in the NAIA Regional Tournament. McDermott would leave Viterbo to become an assistant coach for Mike Dee with the UIC Flames.

On June 15, 2021, Dee announced his retirement, and McDermott was elevated to head coach of the Flames.

== Head coaching record ==
Record table
Season	Team	Overall	Conference	Standing	Postseason
Viterbo V-Hawks (Midwest Classic Conference) (1996–1998)
1996	Viterbo	18–24	10–12		
1997	Viterbo	32–24	21–7		
1998	Viterbo	24–24	15–5		NAIA Regional
Viterbo:		74–72 (.507) (NAIA)	46–24 (.657)		
UIC Flames (Horizon League) (2022)
2022	UIC	22–25	14–11	3rd	Horizon League Tournament
UIC:		– (–)	14–11 (.560)		
UIC Flames (Missouri Valley Conference) (2023–present)
2023	UIC	28–25	13–14	6th	MVC Tournament
2024	UIC	35–20	16–11	5th	MVC Tournament
2025	UIC	22–33	16–11	T–3rd	MVC Tournament
2026	UIC	27–29–1	16–8	1st	NCAA Regional
UIC:		134–132–1 (.504)	61–44 (.581)		
Total:		134–132–1 (.504)			
National champion Postseason invitational champion Conference regular season champion Conference regular season and conference tournament champion Division regular season champion Division regular season and conference tournament champion Conference tournament champion
