= Cumberland Gap Historic District =

Cumberland Gap Historic District may refer to:

- Cumberland Gap Historic District, listed on the NRHP in Claiborne County, Tennessee
- The Cumberland Gap, also designated as the Cumberland Gap Historic District
