= WRWB (disambiguation) =

WRWB-FM is a radio station (99.3 FM) licensed to serve Ellenville, New York, United States.

WRWB may also refer to:

- WNRJ (AM), a radio station (then 1470 AM) licensed to serve Huntington, West Virginia, United States, licensed as WRWB from 2008 to 2010
- WCXZ, a radio station (740 AM) licensed to serve Harrogate, Tennessee, United States, licensed as WRWB from 1994 to 2007
- WHAM-DT2, a The WB affiliated local cable channel's fictional call signs (2000–2006) now the acquiring television station's second subchannel
