= WLMU =

- Harrogate, Tennessee; United States
- Frequency: 91.3 MHz

Ownership
- Owner: Lincoln Memorial University

History
- Call sign meaning: Lincoln Memorial University

Technical information
- Licensing authority: FCC
- Facility ID: 37551
- Class: A
- ERP: 190 watts
- HAAT: 87.0 meters
- Transmitter coordinates: 36°35′10.00″N 83°39′54.00″W

Links
- Public license information: Public file; LMS

WLMU (91.3 FM) is a radio station licensed to Harrogate, Tennessee, United States. The station is owned by Lincoln Memorial University.
