= Frank Niceley =

American politician (1947–2025)

Member of the Tennessee Senate from the 8th district
- In office January 8, 2013 – January 14, 2025
- Preceded by: Doug Overbey (redistricted)
- Succeeded by: Jessie Seal

Member of the Tennessee House of Representatives
- In office January 11, 2005 – January 8, 2013
- Preceded by: Jamie Woodson
- Succeeded by: Andrew Farmer
- Constituency: 17th district
- In office January 10, 1989 – January 12, 1993
- Preceded by: Lynn Lawson
- Succeeded by: Monty Mires
- Constituency: 35th district

Personal details
- Born: Frank Samuel Niceley; March 3, 1947 Knox County, Tennessee, U.S.
- Died: June 19, 2025 (aged 78) Jefferson City, Tennessee
- Party: Republican
- Spouse: Cyndie
- Children: 4
- Education: University of Tennessee (BS)
- Website: Senate website

Frank Niceley (March 3, 1947 – June 19, 2025) was an American politician and long-term Republican member of the Tennessee General Assembly, as a House member and subsequently as a Senator representing the 8th district, consisting of Claiborne, Grainger, Hancock, Hawkins, Jefferson and Union counties. First elected to the House in 1988, he was defeated for re-election to the Senate in 2024.

== Early life, education, and career ==
Niceley was born on March 3, 1947, in Knox County, Tennessee, and grew up in Mascot and on the family dairy farm in Strawberry Plains. After earning a bachelor's degree in soil science from the University of Tennessee in 1969, he became a farmer.

== Tennessee General Assembly ==
Niceley served in the Tennessee House of Representatives from 1988 to 1992 (96th and 97th Tennessee General Assemblies). He was elected again in 2004 to serve in the 104th General Assembly, and won re-election in 2006, 2008, and 2010 to serve in the 105th, 106th, and 107th General Assemblies. During his first two terms he represented District 35; on his return to the House he represented District 17, which encompassed portions of Knox County and the majority of Jefferson County. He was a member of the House Agriculture Committee; the House Conservation and Environment Committee, House Environment Subcommittee; and the House Parks and Tourism Subcommittee.

In 2012, Niceley won election to the Tennessee Senate, where he represented the 8th district as a member of the 108th through 113th General Assemblies. He served until 2024, when he was defeated for re-election in the Republican primary by Jessie Seal after opposing the expansion of the state's school voucher program. In the Senate, he served on the Transportation and Safety; Energy, Agriculture and Natural Resources; and Commerce and Labor committees.

Locally, Niceley was a member of the Tennessee Hunter Alliance and of the Farm Bureau, which enables financial services to farmers.

As a legislator, among other proposals relating to agriculture, Niceley worked toward legalizing hemp cultivation in Tennessee. He criticized the authorization of highway toll express lanes through public–private partnerships, and also argued against making cockfighting a state felony, helping to defeat a bill that would have increased the US$50 fine for cockfighting to $2,500, saying that cockfighting was a cultural tradition and drew out-of-state tourists.

Senator Niceley was known for his profound knowledge and wisdom. His encyclopedic knowledge of history earned him the title of the unofficial Senate historian. One of the statements in the Senate Joint Resolution, passed unanimously in his honor, reads: "Senator Niceley is never afraid to speak truth, even when inconvenient, and often delivers it in a way that makes you laugh, learn, and then Google a few things afterward".

== Controversial statements ==
In 2009, Niceley was one of four Republican members of the Tennessee House who announced plans to join a legal action to force President Barack Obama to release his birth certificate and prove his citizenship.

During a Tennessee House committee hearing in February 2012, Niceley declared that coyotes had been introduced to Tennessee by the Tennessee Wildlife Resources Agency to control the wild deer population, but had subsequently become pests that attack livestock. PolitiFact Tennessee determined that coyotes had arrived in the state naturally, and that Niceley had repeated a previously debunked "urban myth".

Niceley rejected mainstream views of climate science. At a December 2017 meeting of the American Legislative Exchange Council, he told an E&E News reporter: "I think the whole premise that carbon dioxide is a pollutant is flawed. It's not a pollutant, it's just as natural as oxygen. The trees and plants depend on CO_{2} just the same way we depend on oxygen."

In 2022, while speaking in favor of a bill that would make camping on any public property punishable by a $50 fine, Niceley cited Adolf Hitler as an example of someone who worked his way out of homelessness. Niceley stated, "So, all these people — it's not a dead end, they can come out of this, these homeless camps, and have a productive life or in Hitler's case, a very unproductive life."

In response to arguments against his ivermectin bill by two fellow Senators, pointing to potential overdoses, Senator Niceley responded in closing: "It is a lot safer go to your pharmacist and let him tell you how much ivermectin to take than it is to go to the co-op and guess what size horse you are."

== Legislative accomplishments ==
As a Senator, Niceley passed laws to create a lifetime state handgun carry permit and to allow pharmacists to dispense ivermectin. He also decriminalized Tannerite, shotguns and short-barrel rifles, the possession, manufacture, sale, transport, or repair of which used to be a felony in Tennessee. In 2023 he passed a bill to ensure that all sides of a traffic light have to simultaneously be red for at least a second, before the next side can get a green light, as people often try to still pass the intersection when the light is about to turn red, thus reducing the likelihood of "T-bone"-accidents. He also passed laws to remove the sales tax from gold and silver, and protect homemade foods.

== Personal life and death ==
Niceley was Methodist. He had three daughters and a son with his wife Cyndie; his daughter Rachel died in January 2025.

He died in Jefferson Memorial Hospital in Jefferson City of a heart attack on June 19, 2025, at the age of 78, after being found collapsed on his farm in Strawberry Plains.
