= Bean Blossom (album) =

Live album by various artists
- Released: November 1, 1973
- Recorded: June 16–17, 1973
- Venue: Bean Blossom Festival (Beanblossom, Indiana)
- Genre: Bluegrass
- Length: 75:03
- Label: MCA
- Producers: Walter Haynes; Snuffy Miller

Bill Monroe chronology
Bill Monroe and his Blue Grass Boys (1950–60) (1973)	Bean Blossom (1973)	Road of Life (1974)

Jim & Jesse chronology
The Jim & Jesse Show (1972)	Bean Blossom (1973)	Superior Sounds of Bluegrass (1974)

James Monroe chronology
Father & Son (1973)	Bean Blossom (1973)	Something New, Something Different, Something Good (1974)

Jimmy Martin chronology
Moonshine Hollow (1973)	Bean Blossom (1973)	Fly Me to Frisco (1974)

Lester Flatt chronology
Over the Hills to the Poorhouse (1973)	Bean Blossom (1973)	Before You Go (1974)

Bean Blossom is a live album by various bluegrass artists, recorded at the 1973 edition of the titular Bean Blossom Festival in Beanblossom, Indiana. Released by MCA Records on November 1, 1973, it includes performances by Bill Monroe and his Blue Grass Boys, Jim & Jesse and the Virginia Boys, James Monroe and the Midnight Ramblers, Jimmy Martin and the Sunny Mountain Boys, Lester Flatt and the Nashville Grass, and Carl Jackson.

== Background ==
The origin of the Bean Blossom Festival dates back to the Brown County Jamboree, a country music variety show held annually between May and November in Beanblossom, Indiana, starting in the late-1930s. Bill Monroe first performed at the Jamboree in 1951, deciding later that year to buy the show, and the Jamboree Barn in which it was staged — a sale which he finalized before the end of the year. Monroe continued to run the Brown County Jamboree, before using the Beanblossom site to stage his first festival — dubbed the "Big Blue Grass Celebration" — on the weekend of June 24 and 25, 1967. Performers at the inaugural outing of the festival included Monroe and his Blue Grass Boys, Ralph Stanley and the Clinch Mountain Boys, Benny Martin with Rudy Lyle, Red Allen, and Hylo Brown.

Under Monroe's ownership, the Bean Blossom Festival grew quickly in popularity over the years — in 1968, the festival was extended to three days and was attended by around 10,000 people; in 1969, it added a fourth day; and by 1972, the expected attendance for the six-day event had risen to 35,000. In 1973, Monroe's record label MCA Records arranged to record several performances at the festival for a planned live album. Monroe knew about the plan, but did not inform his band until "the last minute" — Blue Grass Boys guitarist Bob Fowler recalled that "He didn't say anything about it to me until the day before we were going to record."

== Recording ==
The material on Bean Blossom was recorded over two days of the festival: June 16 and 17, 1973. The album opens with four tracks by Bill Monroe and his Blue Grass Boys, all of which were recorded on the first day of the recordings. The songs featured included three popular standards by the band: "Mule Skinner Blues", "Uncle Pen" and "Blue Moon of Kentucky". The other song they performed was "You Won't Be Satisfied That Way", which Monroe had only played at shows with Doc Watson previously — bassist Guy Stevenson noted that it was a surprise inclusion in the set, recalling that "[Monroe] got up there and announced it and I'd never heard it before!"

Other recordings featured on the album include set highlights by Jim & Jesse and the Virginia Boys, James Monroe and the Midnight Ramblers, Jimmy Martin and the Sunny Mountain Boys, and Lester Flatt and the Nashville Grass. There are also three tracks from Bill Monroe's closing set on the first day, which featured several guests: "Roll On Buddy" with James Monroe, "I Wonder Where You Are Tonight" with Jim & Jesse, and "Orange Blossom Special" with banjo player Carl Jackson. According to future Blue Grass Boys member Tom Ewing in his book Bill Monroe: The Life and Music of the Blue Grass Man, Monroe invited Jackson — who was only in attendance at the festival as a visitor — to perform as a special guest simply to "celebrate his success", as he had recently joined Glen Campbell's band.

The final four songs on the album showcase Bill Monroe and his Blue Grass Boys with an extra 11 guest fiddlers joining them: former Blue Grass Boys members Howdy Forrester, Gordon Terry and Ralph "Joe" Meadows, Jim Brock and Clarence "Tater" Tate from the Virginia Boys, Randall Collins from the Midnight Ramblers, Paul Warren from the Nashville Grass, Tex Logan from Charlie Monroe's band the Kentucky Pardners, Curly Ray Cline from the Lonesome Pine Fiddlers, Lonnie Pierce and Arnold "Buck" Ryan. The practice of multiple fiddlers performing with Monroe had been established on the Grand Ole Opry, where many in attendance would guest on his performance of "Close By", and was later featured in Monroe's set on both "Close By" and "Sally Goodin" at a festival held by Carlton Haney over Labor Day weekend in 1968.

== Release ==
Bean Blossom was released by MCA Records on November 1, 1973. The performances of "Down Yonder" and "Swing Low, Sweet Chariot" featuring the "roll call" of fiddlers were also released together on a single the following March.

== Reception ==
Professional ratings
Review scores
Source	Rating
AllMusic	4.5/5 stars

Bean Blossom received positive reviews from critics and commentators. Billboard magazine wrote that the album "has something for every fan of this form of music", Cash Box magazine noted that it "contains a great selection of material, and will be sure to catch on", and the Walrus progressive music newsletter gushed that "the music is tops and it always cooks". The album reached the top 40 of the Record World magazine Country Album Chart, remaining on the chart into 1974. In a retrospective review for AllMusic, Burgin Mathews wrote that "There is very little in the world quite like a good, live bluegrass album, and this is as good as it gets", claiming that the album "captures the true, original spirit of [bluegrass] as much or more than any other album" and "makes for about the most exciting 75 minutes of music imaginable".

== Track listing ==
Bean Blossom track listing
No.	Title	Writer(s)	Performer(s)	Length
1.	"Mule Skinner Blues (Blue Yodel No. 8)"	Jimmie Rodgers; George Vaughn Horton	Bill Monroe and his Blue Grass Boys	3:05
2.	"You Won't Be Satisfied That Way"	Jimmie Davis; Lloyd Ellis	Bill Monroe and his Blue Grass Boys	2:36
3.	"Uncle Pen"	Bill Monroe	Bill Monroe and his Blue Grass Boys	2:21
4.	"Blue Moon of Kentucky"	Monroe	Bill Monroe and his Blue Grass Boys	3:18
5.	"Ole Slew-Foot"	Howard Hausey	Jim & Jesse and the Virginia Boys	2:43
6.	"Sweet Little Miss Blue Eyes"	Don Helms; Merle "Red" Taylor	Jim & Jesse and the Virginia Boys	2:16
7.	"Please Be My Love"	Monroe Fields; Carl Sauceman	Jim & Jesse and the Virginia Boys	3:02
8.	"I Wish You Knew"	Charlie Louvin; Ira Louvin	Jim & Jesse and the Virginia Boys	2:40
9.	"Love, Please Come Home"	Leon Jackson	James Monroe and the Midnight Ramblers	2:21
10.	"Train 45 (Heading South)"	Monroe	James Monroe and the Midnight Ramblers	2:36
11.	"Bonny"	Juanita Southern	James Monroe and the Midnight Ramblers	2:05
12.	"When My Blue Moon Turns to Gold Again"	Gene Sullivan; Wiley Walker	James Monroe and the Midnight Ramblers	2:20
13.	"Hit Parade of Love"	Jimmy Martin; Wade Birchfield	Jimmy Martin and the Sunny Mountain Boys	2:56
14.	"Mary Ann"	Lonnie Treat; Johnny Stills	Jimmy Martin and the Sunny Mountain Boys	3:00
15.	"Sunny Side of the Mountain"	Byron Gregory; Harry McAuliffe	Jimmy Martin and the Sunny Mountain Boys	2:53
16.	"Free Born Man"	Mark Lindsay; Keith Allison	Jimmy Martin and the Sunny Mountain Boys	3:17
17.	"Tennessee"	Martin; Doyle Neikirk	Jimmy Martin and the Sunny Mountain Boys	2:43
18.	"Roll in My Sweet Baby's Arms"	Traditional	Lester Flatt and the Nashville Grass	2:51
19.	"Feudin' Banjos"	Arthur Smith	Lester Flatt and the Nashville Grass	2:09
20.	"Ballad of Jed Clampett"	Paul Henning	Lester Flatt and the Nashville Grass	2:05
21.	"Roll On Buddy"	Doyle Wilburn; Teddy Wilburn	Bill Monroe and James Monroe	3:04
22.	"I Wonder Where You Are Tonight"	Peter Bond	Bill Monroe and Jim & Jesse	2:59
23.	"Orange Blossom Special"	Ervin T. Rouse	Carl Jackson	2:27
24.	"Down Yonder"	L. Wolfe Gilbert	Bill Monroe and his Blue Grass Boys	4:07
25.	"Soldier's Joy"	Traditional	Bill Monroe and his Blue Grass Boys	2:32
26.	"Grey Eagle"	Traditional	Bill Monroe and his Blue Grass Boys	2:33
27.	"Swing Low, Sweet Chariot"	Traditional	Bill Monroe and his Blue Grass Boys	4:04
Total length:				75:03

== Personnel ==
Bill Monroe and his Blue Grass Boys tracks

- Bill Monroe — mandolin, vocals
- Bob Fowler — guitar
- Jack Hicks — banjo
- Kenny Baker — fiddle
- Guy Stevenson — string bass

Additional performers on tracks 24–27:

- Jim Brock — fiddle
- Lonnie Pierce — fiddle
- Ralph "Joe" Meadows — fiddle
- Randall Collins — fiddle
- Arnold "Buck" Ryan — fiddle
- Gordon Terry — fiddle
- Howard "Howdy" Forrester — fiddle
- Benjamin "Tex" Logan — fiddle
- Curly Ray Cline — fiddle
- Paul Warren — fiddle
- Clarence "Tater" Tate — fiddle

Jim & Jesse and the Virginia Boys tracks

- Jim McReynolds — guitar, tenor and lead vocals
- Jesse McReynolds — mandolin, lead vocals
- Vic Jordan — banjo, baritone vocals
- Jim Brock — fiddle
- Clarence "Tater" Tate — string bass

James Monroe and the Midnight Ramblers tracks

- James Monroe — guitar, vocals
- Marc Pruett — banjo
- Randall Collins — fiddle
- Hubert "Hoot" Hester — fiddle
- Monroe Fields — string bass

Jimmy Martin and the Sunny Mountain Boys tracks

- Jimmy Martin — guitar, lead vocals
- Ronnie Prevette — mandolin, tenor vocals
- Kenny Ingram — banjo, baritone vocals
- Paul Mullins — fiddle
- Ray Martin — electric bass

Lester Flatt and the Nashville Grass tracks

- Lester Flatt — guitar, vocals
- John "Curly" Seckler — guitar
- Marty Stuart — mandolin
- Haskell McCormick — banjo
- Paul Warren — fiddle
- Charlie Nixon — dobro
- Howard "Johnny" Johnson — string bass

Tracks 21–23

- Bill Monroe — mandolin, tenor vocals
- Bob Fowler — guitar
- Jack Hicks — banjo (tracks 21 and 22)
- Kenny Baker — fiddle
- Guy Stevenson — string bass
- James Monroe — guitar and lead vocals (track 21)
- Jim McReynolds — guitar and lead vocals (track 22)
- Jesse McReynolds — mandolin and baritone vocals (track 22)
- Carl Jackson — banjo (track 23)

== Bibliography ==
- Ewing, Tom (September 7, 2018), Bill Monroe: The Life and Music of the Blue Grass Man (Music in American Life), Champaign, Illinois: University of Illinois Press, ISBN 978-0252041891
