= Cumberland Gap, Tennessee =

Town in Claiborne County, Tennessee, United States

- Town
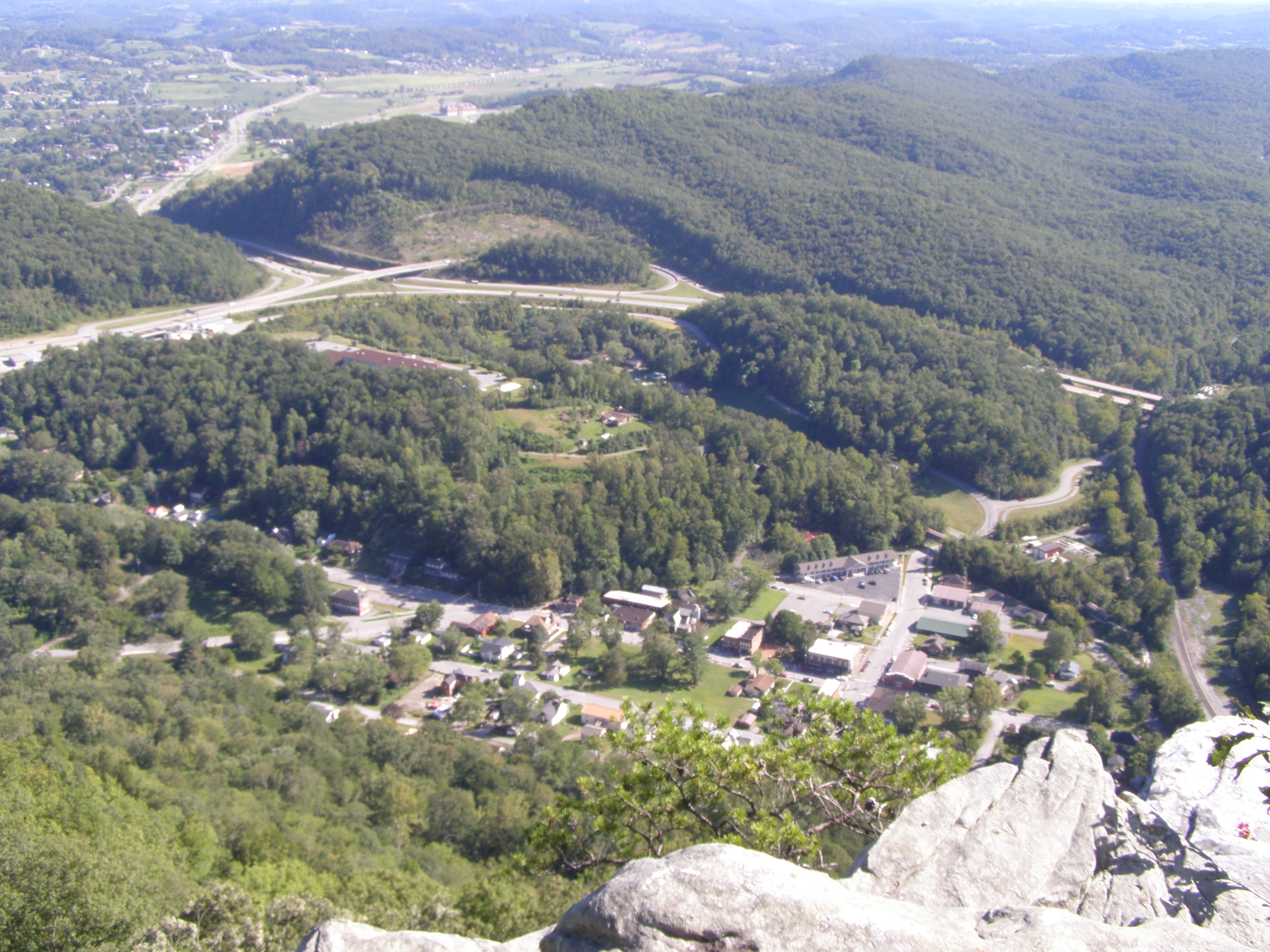
- Cumberland Gap, as viewed from the Pinnacle Overlook
- Nickname: The Gap
- Location of Cumberland Gap in Claiborne County, Tennessee.
- Coordinates: 36°35′56″N 83°40′2″W
- Country: United States
- State: Tennessee
- County: Claiborne
- Settled: 1770s
- Incorporated: 1907
- Named for: Cumberland Gap mountain pass

Government
  - Type: Mayor-council
  - Mayor: Neal Pucciarelli
  - Town Council: Aldermen: Susan Bain; John Douglas; Teresa Fuson; Kathy Maxwell; John Ravnum; Phillip Waller

Area
  - Total: 0.33 sq mi (0.85 km^{2})
  - Land: 0.33 sq mi (0.85 km^{2})
  - Water: 0 sq mi (0.00 km^{2})
- Elevation: 1,417 ft (432 m)

Population (2020)
  - Total: 313
  - Density: 951.4/sq mi (367.34/km^{2})
- Time zone: UTC-5 (Eastern (EST))
  - Summer (DST): UTC-4 (EDT)
- ZIP codes: 37724, 37752
- Area code: 423
- FIPS code: 47-18880
- GNIS feature ID: 2406347
- Website: townofcumberlandgap.com

Cumberland Gap is a town in Claiborne County, Tennessee, United States. Its population was 313 at the 2020 census, and estimated to be 315 in 2023. The town is located below the Cumberland Gap, a historic mountain pass for which is the town's namesake, and inside of the boundaries of Cumberland Gap National Historical Park.

The majority of the town's downtown area is listed on the National Register of Historic Places as the Cumberland Gap Historic District.

== History ==
The Cherokee and Shawnee Native American tribes traveled through a game trail known to the Shawnee as Athiamiowee. The tribes often fought each other and white settlers called the trail The Warriors' Path. The area that came to be known as the Cumberland Gap was a gateway on the trail through the mountains. Although many settlers had traveled through the pass and their reports had traveled back east, Thomas Walker is credited as the settler who discovered the pass. Walker was hired by the Loyal Land Company to search for a suitable site for a settlement on the western side of the mountains. It became a postal town in 1803, and was officially incorporated as a city in 1907.

The town changed hands four times during the Civil War, but no battles actually took place there.

In 1888, a work camp was established at Cumberland Gap by Scottish-born entrepreneur Alexander Arthur (1846–1912) to house workers needed to build a tunnel for the Knoxville, Cumberland Gap & Louisville Railroad. Arthur, who was attempting to establish a large-scale iron production operation in the Cumberland Gap region, founded the nearby cities of Middlesboro, Kentucky, and Harrogate, Tennessee, and the nearby community of Arthur.

In 1996, the completion of the Cumberland Gap Tunnel re-routed US 25E, bypassing the town's central business district. This bypassing of the town caused the local economy to decline as annual payrolls for Cumberland Gap dropped 40% in a ten-year span from 1994 (two years before the tunnel's completion) to 2004.

== Geography ==
Cumberland Gap is located at 36°35′56″N 83°40′2″W (36.598976, -83.667318).

According to the United States Census Bureau, the town has a total area of 0.3 square miles (0.78 km^{2}), all land.

== Demographics ==
Historical population
Census	Pop.	Note	%±
1910	347		—
1920	304		−12.4%
1930	369		21.4%
1940	409		10.8%
1950	403		−1.5%
1960	291		−27.8%
1970	231		−20.6%
1980	263		13.9%
1990	210		−20.2%
2000	204		−2.9%
2010	494		142.2%
2020	313		−36.6%

=== 2020 census ===
Cumberland Gap racial composition
Race	Number	Percentage
White (non-Hispanic)	265	84.66%
Black or African American (non-Hispanic)	9	2.88%
Native American	1	0.32%
Asian	22	7.03%
Other/Mixed	10	3.19%
Hispanic or Latino	6	1.92%

As of the 2020 United States census, there were 313 people, 115 households, and 48 families residing in the town.

=== 2000 census ===
As of the census of 2000, there were 204 people, 89 households, and 51 families residing in the town. The population density was 629.9 inhabitants per square mile (243.2/km^{2}). There were 111 housing units at an average density of 342.8/sq mi (132.4/km^{2}). The racial makeup of the town was 99.02% White and 0.98% Native American. Cumberland Gap ranks 289th in city size in Tennessee according to the 2017 U.S. Census Bureau.

There were 89 households, out of which 25.8% had children under the age of 18 living with them, 47.2% were married couples living together, 6.7% had a female householder with no husband present, and 41.6% were nonfamilies. 34.8% of all households were made up of individuals, and 15.7% had someone living alone who was 65 years of age or older. The average household size was 2.29 and the average family size was 3.06.

In the town, the population was spread out, with 21.1% under the age of 18, 10.3% from 18 to 24, 30.9% from 25 to 44, 23.0% from 45 to 64, and 14.7% who were 65 years of age or older. The median age was 37 years. For every 100 females, there were 90.7 males. For every 100 females age 18 and over, there were 83.0 males.

The median income for a household in the town was $36,250, and the median income for a family was $40,625. Males had a median income of $36,250 versus $17,083 for females. The per capita income for the town was $12,005. About 9.3% of families and 23.3% of the population were below the poverty line, including 26.7% of those under the age of 18 and 28.6% of those 65 or over.

== Economy ==
The major industry sectors employing Cumberland Gap residents are healthcare, education, arts, and service. Food preparation and service-related jobs have become the fastest growing within the town of Cumberland Gap. However, according to the American Community Survey, 10% of Cumberland Gap residents work inside of the town limits, with most commuting to other parts of Claiborne County, Middlesboro, and Campbell County.

== Arts and culture ==
=== Festivals ===
There are several festivals and events held in Cumberland Gap, some of the more notable events include:

- White Lightning Trail Festival - festival held every May celebrating East Tennessee, folk and pioneer life, and Southern Appalachian

culture.

- Mountain Heritage Literary Festival - festival held every June drawing in writers from throughout the country to celebrate writing,

music, and Appalachian heritage.

- The Mountain Fiesta - celebration of Latin American and Appalachian culture held every April, includes professional dance classes, live music, art demonstrations, and a variety of Latin American and Appalachian cultural activities.

=== Historic sites ===
- Cumberland Gap Historic District
- Cumberland Gap National Historical Park

== Education ==
There are no schools in the town limits, but Cumberland Gap High School located southwest of Harrogate, Tennessee, is in Cumberland Gap's 37724 zip code.

Lincoln Memorial University is located in nearby Harrogate.
