= J. Frank White Academy =

Private school in Harrogate, Tennessee, United States

Location
- 6965 Cumberland Gap Parkway; Harrogate, TN 37752; 36.577°N 83.661°W

Information
- Type: Private
- Established: 1989
- Principal: Kristina Hudson
- Grades: K to 12
- Campus: Rural
- Nickname: Knights
- Website: www.lmunet.edu/jfwa/

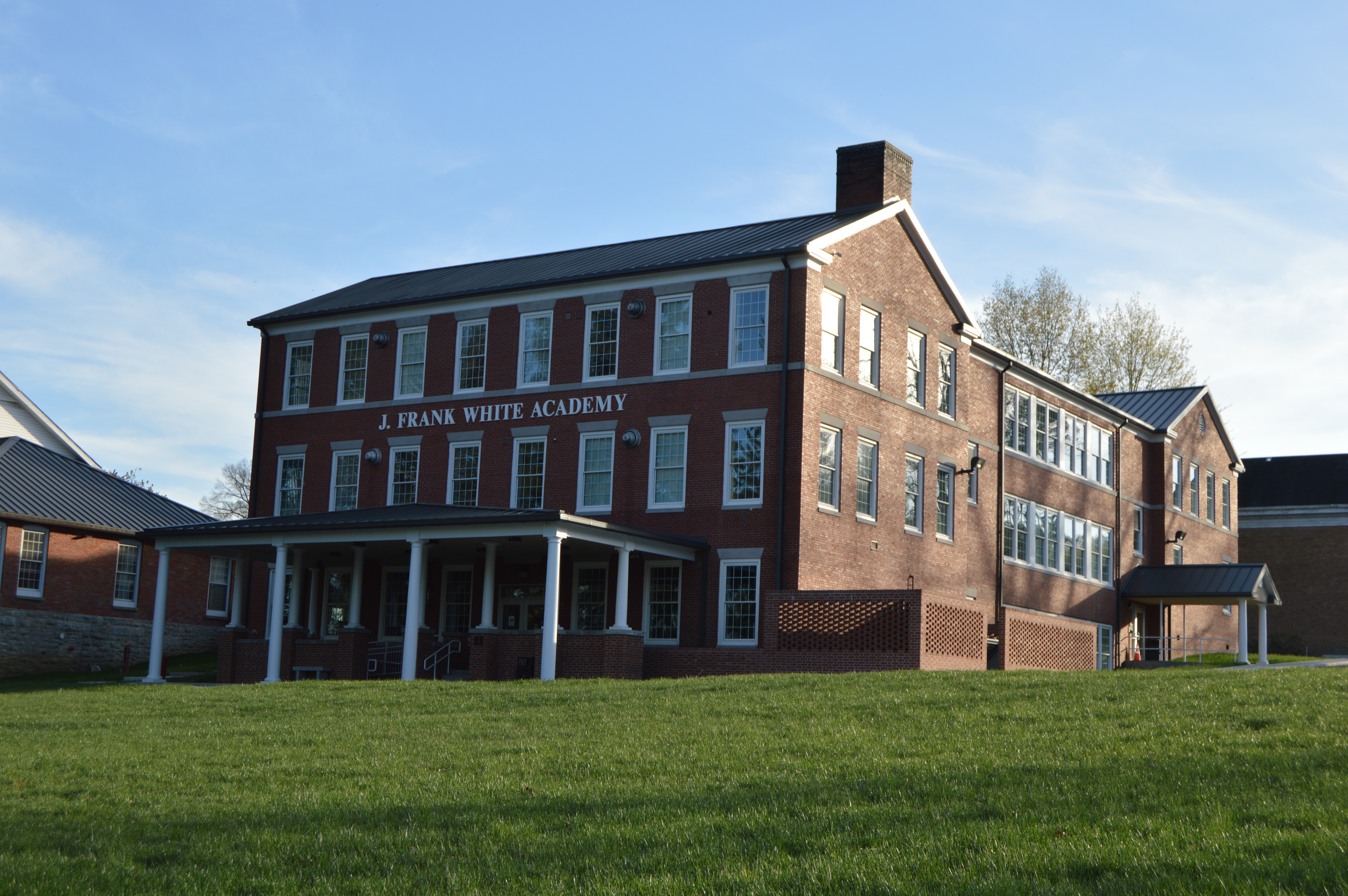
Main building

The J. Frank White Academy (JFWA) is an independent, co-educational, private, college preparatory school located on the campus of Lincoln Memorial University in Harrogate, Tennessee. The principal is Dr. Kristina Hudson. The J. Frank White Academy is fully accredited by the AdvancEd. Faculty, staff and students of the Academy have access to the facilities and services of the University, including food services, libraries, labs, and athletics facilities.

The school has about 190 students (Grades K-12) and boasts a 100 percent college placement rate. The Academy has the option for juniors and seniors to take college courses at Lincoln Memorial University, included in the tuition. Academy students frequently access LMU facilities, including science labs, high-tech media center and library, tutoring lab, tennis courts, cafeteria, swimming pool and weight rooms, baseball field, Abraham Lincoln Library and Museum and the landmark 5,000 seat Tex Turner Arena.

== Athletics ==
The Academy fields 10 athletic teams, including boys and girls basketball, tennis, cross country, golf and soccer, as well as baseball and cheerleading.

== World School Forum ==
The J. Frank White Academy has a unique relationship with the World School Forum. The Forum is designed to train students to adopt a global perspective by becoming receptive to differences and to enable them to form lasting friendships. The ultimate goal of the program is to excel in a global society. Every year, the Academy sends three students abroad to represent the United States. In the past, students have traveled to Japan, Australia, Italy, United Kingdom, and Germany. The J. Frank White Academy is the only school in the United States that is represented in the Forum.

== Scholarships ==
The J. Frank White Academy offers a limited number of scholarships to assist with tuition costs. These funds are provided by donors who have made contributions to the Academy to help fund scholarships, and most of those who have contributed have set guidelines for awarding them. Students who are interested in being considered for assistance must complete a scholarship application when they apply to the Academy. The scholarship committee will review the applications and award available funds according to the pre-set criteria for each scholarship. All JFWA scholarship awards are for one year only and are not automatically renewed for succeeding years. Students who wish to be considered for scholarships must re-apply for them each year.
