= Little Sycamore, Tennessee =

Unincorporated community in Tennessee, US

Coordinates: 36.442029°N 83.518517°W

Little Sycamore is an unincorporated community located in Claiborne County, Tennessee. It is located just south of Tazewell.

It contains Little Sycamore Church.
