= Lone Mountain, Tennessee =

- Unincorporated community
- Location within Tennessee Location within the United States
- Coordinates: 36°23′26″N 83°35′06″W
- Country: United States
- State: Tennessee
- County: Claiborne
- Elevation: 1,125 ft (343 m)
- Time zone: UTC-5 (Eastern (EST))
  - Summer (DST): UTC-4 (EDT)
- ZIP code: 37773
- Area code: 423
- GNIS feature ID: 1291841

Lone Mountain is an unincorporated community in Claiborne County, Tennessee, United States. Its ZIP code is 37773.

It is in the middle of the Crab Orchard Mountains.
