= Claiborne County, Tennessee =

County in Tennessee, United States

- County
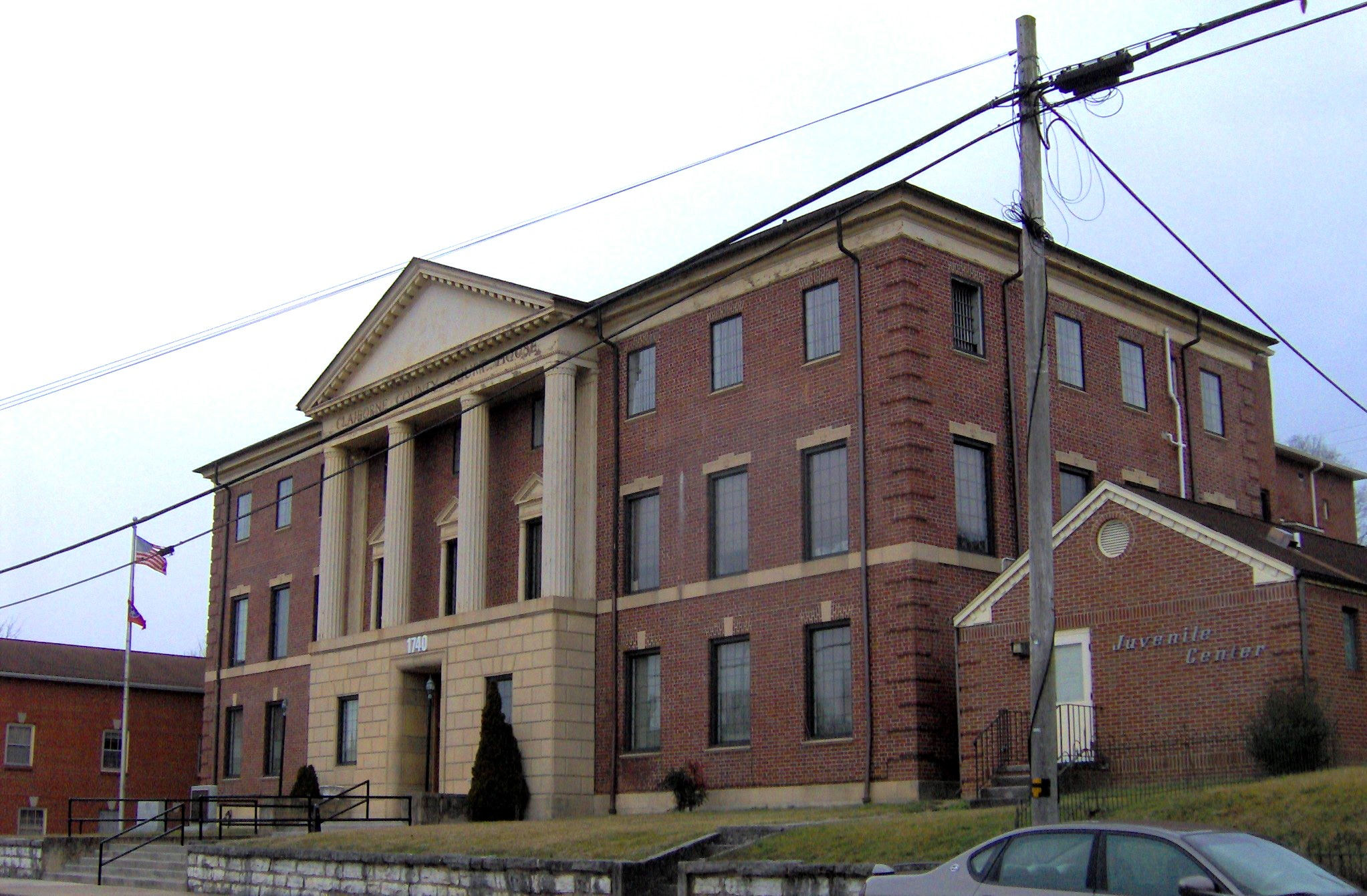
- Claiborne County Courthouse in Tazewell

- Seal

- Location within the U.S. state of Tennessee
- Coordinates: 36°29′N 83°40′W
- Country: United States
- State: Tennessee
- Founded: October 29, 1801
- Named for: William C. C. Claiborne
- Seat: Tazewell
- Largest city: Harrogate

Area
  - Total: 442 sq mi (1,140 km^{2})
  - Land: 435.0 sq mi (1,127 km^{2})
  - Water: 7.0 sq mi (18 km^{2}) 1.6%

Population (2020)
  - Total: 32,043
  - Estimate (2025): 33,229 ▲
  - Density: 74/sq mi (29/km^{2})
- Time zone: UTC−5 (Eastern)
  - Summer (DST): UTC−4 (EDT)
- Congressional district: 2nd
- Website: www.claibornecountytn.gov

Claiborne County is a county located in the U.S. state of Tennessee. As of the 2020 census, the population was 32,043. Its county seat is Tazewell and its largest city is Harrogate.

== History ==
Claiborne County was established on October 29, 1801, created from Grainger and Hawkins counties and extended the southern boundary to Anderson County. It was named for Virginia tidewater aristocrat William C. C. Claiborne, one of the first judges of the Tennessee Superior Court and one of the first representatives in U.S. Congress from Tennessee.

Like a few other East Tennessee counties, Claiborne County was largely opposed to secession on the eve of the Civil War. In Tennessee's Ordinance of Secession referendum on June 8, 1861, the county's residents voted against secession by a margin of 1,243 to 250.

The Four Seasons Hotel was built on the location of present-day Lincoln Memorial University in 1892 by an English land company, the American Association Limited, which was led locally by flamboyant businessman Alexander Arthur. At the time, it was reported by its promoters to be the largest hotel in the United States. The main building was four stories high with a lobby 75 feet square and a dining room 50 feet by 160 feet. It was reported to contain 700 rooms. Also included in the complex were a hospital, an inn, a sanitarium, and other smaller buildings. The hotel was not a success and was demolished in 1895. During its operation, the Four Seasons Hotel offered buggy rides to nearby English Cave, which had been improved with wooden stairways, walkways, and bridges. The rotting remains of these wooden structures can still be seen in the cave.

== Notable people ==
from Claiborne County include State Representative Boyd C. Fugate (1884–1967) and Tennessee's early female sheriff Della Riley. Claiborne County's musical heritage includes musicians Rodney Atkins, Cindy Morgan and Michael McMeel as well as bluegrass musicians Steve Gulley, Milton Estes, CF Bailey and Shadow Ridge, Vic Graves, Scott and Alan Powers, The Honeycutt Brothers, Buster Turner and the Turner Brothers, Bryan Turner, Patrick Beeler, Larry Carter, Randall Massengill, and Jerry Cole. Notable Old-Time musicians from Claiborne County include Fiddling Bob Rogers, as well as ballad singers Mae Ray, Alice Parsons, Chester Lewis, and Kinley Brooks, whose repertoires are included in Cecil Sharp's English Folk Songs from the Southern Appalachians. Other ballad collectors in Claiborne County include Artus Moser, C P Cambiaire, and Tillman Cadle. Local African American musicians include gospel singers Ralph Ford and Rick Gregory.

Lincoln Memorial University's literary heritage includes authors Silas House, James Still, and Jesse Stuart.

== Geography ==
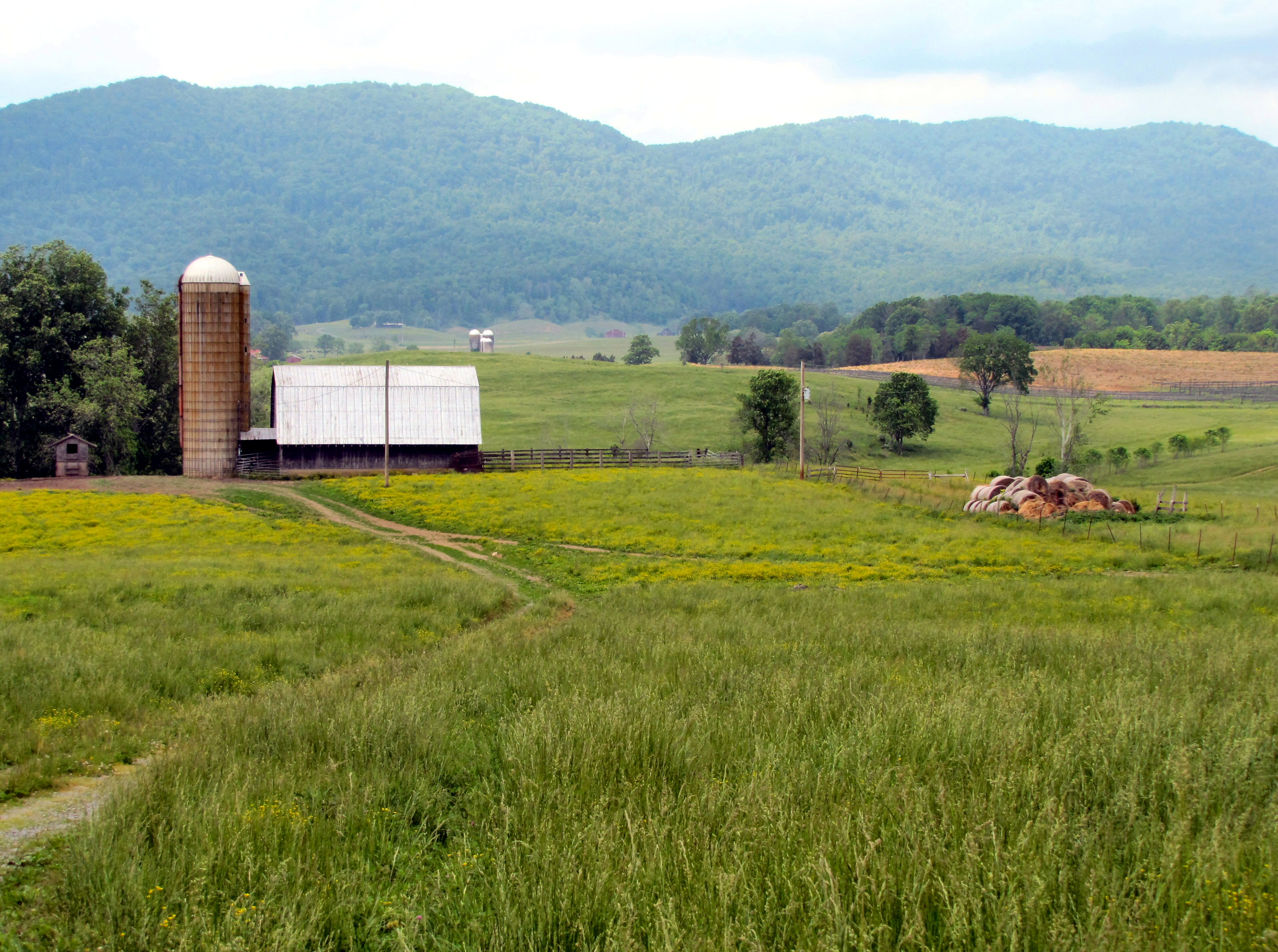
Farmlands near Speedwell

According to the U.S. Census Bureau, the county has a total area of 442 square miles (1,140 km^{2}), of which 435 square miles (1,130 km^{2}) is land and 7.0 square miles (18 km^{2}) (1.6%) is water. Major Waterways include the Powell River and Clinch River, which forms part of Norris Lake. Major high points are Bryson Mountain, Powell Mountain, Lone Mountain, Raven Hill, and Wallen Ridge.

=== Adjacent counties ===
- Bell County, Kentucky (north)
- Lee County, Virginia (northeast)
- Hancock County (east)
- Grainger County (south)
- Union County (southwest)
- Campbell County (west)
- Whitley County, Kentucky (northwest)

=== National protected area ===
- Cumberland Gap National Historical Park (part)

=== State protected areas ===
- Cumberland Trail (part)
- Powell River Preserve State Natural Area

== Demographics ==
Historical population
Census	Pop.	Note	%±
1810	4,798		—
1820	5,508		14.8%
1830	8,470		53.8%
1840	9,474		11.9%
1850	9,369		−1.1%
1860	9,643		2.9%
1870	9,321		−3.3%
1880	13,373		43.5%
1890	15,103		12.9%
1900	20,696		37.0%
1910	23,504		13.6%
1920	23,286		−0.9%
1930	24,313		4.4%
1940	24,657		1.4%
1950	24,788		0.5%
1960	19,067		−23.1%
1970	19,420		1.9%
1980	24,595		26.6%
1990	26,137		6.3%
2000	29,862		14.3%
2010	32,213		7.9%
2020	32,043		−0.5%
2025 (est.)	33,229	▲	3.7%
U.S. Decennial Census; 1790-1960 1900-1990; 1990-2000 2010-2014

=== Racial and ethnic composition ===
Claiborne County, Tennessee – Racial and ethnic composition Note: the US Census treats Hispanic/Latino as an ethnic category. This table excludes Latinos from the racial categories and assigns them to a separate category. Hispanics/Latinos may be of any race.
Race / ethnicity (NH = Non-Hispanic)	Pop 1980	Pop 1990	Pop 2000	Pop 2010	Pop 2020	% 1980	% 1990	% 2000	% 2010	% 2020
White alone (NH)	24,074	25,641	29,074	31,051	29,966	97.88%	98.10%	97.36%	96.39%	93.52%
Black or African American alone (NH)	309	248	224	280	314	1.26%	0.95%	0.75%	0.87%	0.98%
Native American or Alaska Native alone (NH)	46	56	71	91	58	0.19%	0.21%	0.24%	0.28%	0.18%
Asian alone (NH)	8	108	76	165	148	0.03%	0.41%	0.25%	0.51%	0.46%
Native Hawaiian or Pacific Islander alone (NH)	x	x	3	5	11	x	x	0.01%	0.02%	0.03%
Other race alone (NH)	10	1	12	17	87	0.04%	0.00%	0.04%	0.05%	0.27%
Mixed race or Multiracial (NH)	x	x	210	339	969	x	x	0.70%	1.05%	3.02%
Hispanic or Latino (any race)	148	83	192	265	490	0.60%	0.32%	0.64%	0.82%	1.53%
Total	24,595	26,137	29,862	32,213	32,043	100.00%	100.00%	100.00%	100.00%	100.00%

=== 2020 census ===
As of the 2020 census, there were 32,043 people and 8,683 families residing in the county. The median age was 43.6 years; 19.1% of residents were under the age of 18 and 20.9% of residents were 65 years of age or older. For every 100 females there were 95.2 males, and for every 100 females age 18 and over there were 92.6 males age 18 and over.

The racial makeup of the county was 94.2% White, 1.0% Black or African American, 0.2% American Indian and Alaska Native, 0.5% Asian, <0.1% Native Hawaiian and Pacific Islander, 0.7% from some other race, and 3.5% from two or more races. Hispanic or Latino residents of any race comprised 1.5% of the population.

28.7% of residents lived in urban areas, while 71.3% lived in rural areas.

There were 13,198 households in the county, of which 25.7% had children under the age of 18 living in them. Of all households, 46.9% were married-couple households, 19.3% were households with a male householder and no spouse or partner present, and 28.3% were households with a female householder and no spouse or partner present. About 31.3% of all households were made up of individuals and 14.1% had someone living alone who was 65 years of age or older.

There were 15,321 housing units, of which 13.9% were vacant. Among occupied housing units, 73.2% were owner-occupied and 26.8% were renter-occupied. The homeowner vacancy rate was 1.7% and the rental vacancy rate was 9.3%.

=== 2000 census ===
As of the census of 2000, there were 29,862 people, 11,799 households, and 8,684 families residing in the county. The population density was 69 people per square mile (27 people/km^{2}). There were 13,262 housing units at an average density of 30 units per square mile (12/km^{2}). The racial makeup of the county was 97.79% White, 0.75% Black or African American, 0.24% Native American, 0.28% Asian, 0.01% Pacific Islander, 0.19% from other races, and 0.74% from two or more races. 0.64% of the population were Hispanic or Latino of any race.

There were 11,799 households, out of which 32.00% had children under the age of 18 living with them, 58.80% were married couples living together, 11.00% had a female householder with no husband present, and 26.40% were non-families. 23.40% of all households were made up of individuals, and 10.00% had someone living alone who was 65 years of age or older. The average household size was 2.48 and the average family size was 2.91.

In the county, the population was spread out, with 23.60% under the age of 18, 8.90% from 18 to 24, 28.70% from 25 to 44, 25.40% from 45 to 64, and 13.40% who were 65 years of age or older. The median age was 37 years. For every 100 females there were 93.30 males. For every 100 females age 18 and over, there were 91.40 males.

The median income for a household in the county was $25,782, and the median income for a family was $31,234. Males had a median income of $26,280 versus $19,951 for females. The per capita income for the county was $13,032. About 18.40% of families and 22.60% of the population were below the poverty line, including 27.70% of those under age 18 and 19.90% of those age 65 or over.

== Education ==
- Lincoln Memorial University
- Lincoln Memorial University - DeBusk College of Osteopathic Medicine
- Walters State Community College
- http://www.claibornecountyschools.com/

== Tourism ==
Recent Awards and Recognition

- Received Chuck Davis award in 2013 for "Best Practices" in Tourism development.
- The Claiborne County Fair Association was awarded the 2014 "Most Improved Fair in Tennessee" by the TN State Fair Association.
- Cumberland Gap Genealogy Jamboree and Pioneer Days was named one of the top 20 events in the Southeast for June in: 2015 and 2017 by the Southeast Tourism Society.
- The White Lightning Trail Festival was named one of the top 20 events in the Southeast for June in: 2013, 2014, and 2015 by the Southeast Tourism Society.
- The Claiborne County Fair Association was awarded the 2016 "Merit Award" by the Tennessee Department of Agriculture.
- Cumberland Gap National Historic Park received the 2017 "Keeper of the Light Award" as part of the National Park Service Centennial celebration.
- The Powell River Blueway Trail received the 2018 "Excellence Award" from the East Tennessee Development District.
- The Powell River Blueway Trail received the 2018 "Excellence in Communication and Outreach Award" from the Tennessee River Basin Network.

== Communities ==
=== Cities ===
- Harrogate
- New Tazewell

=== Towns ===
- Cumberland Gap
- Tazewell (county seat)

=== Unincorporated communities ===
- Arthur
- Clairfield
- Clouds
- Eagan
- Goin
- Hopewell
- Little Sycamore
- Lone Mountain
- Pruden
- Reliance
- Shawanee
- Speedwell

== Infrastructure ==
=== Transportation ===
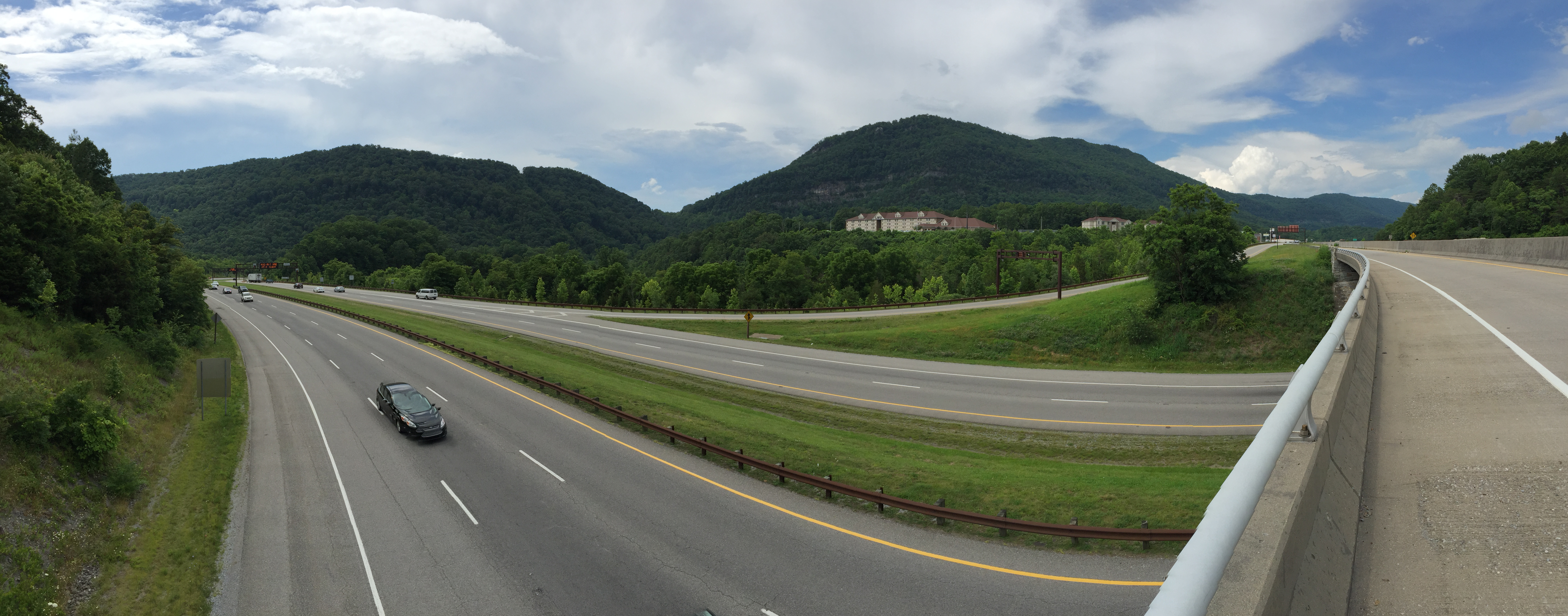
U.S. Route 25E near the Cumberland Gap

U.S. Routes 25E, and State Route 63 are the major arterial roadways in the county. US 25E, established as the East Tennessee Crossing Byway and Appalachian Development Corridor S, provides four-lane expressway north-south access to Grainger County and the Kentucky-Tennessee state-line. SR 63, provides two-lane access from the city of Harrogate to Campbell County.

== Politics ==
Claiborne County is a Republican stronghold. The last Democrat to carry this county was Bill Clinton in 1992.

United States presidential election results for Claiborne County, Tennessee
Year	Republican		Democratic		Third party(ies)	
Year	No.	%	No.	%	No.	%
1912	589	22.58%	903	34.61%	1,117	42.81%
1916	1,398	56.60%	1,053	42.63%	19	0.77%
1920	2,612	67.88%	1,236	32.12%	0	0.00%
1924	1,775	59.97%	1,091	36.86%	94	3.18%
1928	2,565	67.68%	1,225	32.32%	0	0.00%
1932	1,725	32.76%	3,518	66.82%	22	0.42%
1936	2,400	44.04%	3,036	55.71%	14	0.26%
1940	2,879	49.95%	2,792	48.44%	93	1.61%
1944	2,426	59.20%	1,649	40.24%	23	0.56%
1948	2,507	53.50%	2,068	44.13%	111	2.37%
1952	3,221	59.62%	2,182	40.38%	0	0.00%
1956	3,377	62.21%	1,973	36.35%	78	1.44%
1960	3,888	64.20%	2,142	35.37%	26	0.43%
1964	2,852	52.49%	2,581	47.51%	0	0.00%
1968	3,101	59.75%	1,314	25.32%	775	14.93%
1972	3,632	73.94%	1,230	25.04%	50	1.02%
1976	3,227	47.86%	3,461	51.33%	55	0.82%
1980	4,289	59.05%	2,844	39.16%	130	1.79%
1984	4,474	60.70%	2,870	38.94%	27	0.37%
1988	4,071	57.48%	2,977	42.04%	34	0.48%
1992	4,065	42.86%	4,509	47.54%	911	9.60%
1996	4,023	46.35%	3,861	44.49%	795	9.16%
2000	5,023	55.81%	3,841	42.68%	136	1.51%
2004	6,448	61.18%	4,034	38.27%	58	0.55%
2008	7,175	68.86%	3,078	29.54%	167	1.60%
2012	7,617	74.84%	2,433	23.90%	128	1.26%
2016	8,602	80.09%	1,832	17.06%	306	2.85%
2020	10,604	81.92%	2,202	17.01%	139	1.07%
2024	11,463	84.70%	1,971	14.56%	100	0.74%

== See also ==
- National Register of Historic Places listings in Claiborne County, Tennessee
