= Arthur, Tennessee =

Unincorporated community in Tennessee, US

Coordinates: 36°32′53″N 83°40′15″W

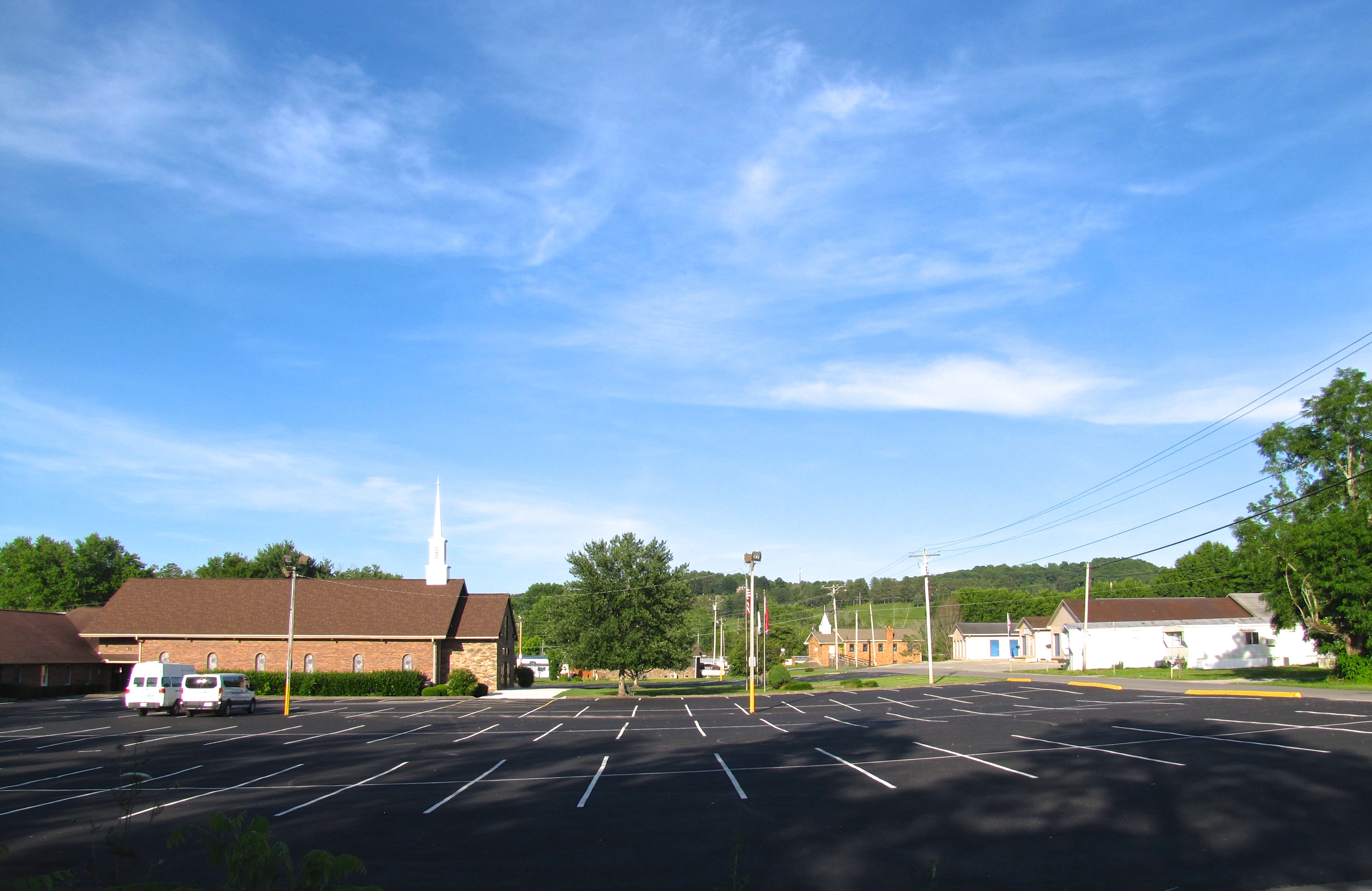
Arthur, Tennessee

Arthur is an unincorporated community in Claiborne County, Tennessee, United States. It is located along State Route 63 southwest of Harrogate, and a few miles south of the Cumberland Gap. Its zip code is 37707.

== History ==
In 1870, land developer Alexander A. Arthur moved to the area from Montreal, Quebec, Canada. He laid out a town, based on consolidated land parcels. In 1876 the area was called Butcher Springs and with the creation of a post office the town became known as Arthur in 1890. Alexander Arthur was key in having a railroad from Knoxville to Middlesboro, Kentucky be installed through Arthur, allowing his namesake to develop into a railroad town. The town shipped coal, ore and other minerals.

As of 1901, a school, Wester College, was located in Arthur. The school was operated by Dan Wester and all grades were taught. The school burned down in the 1910s.

== Geography ==
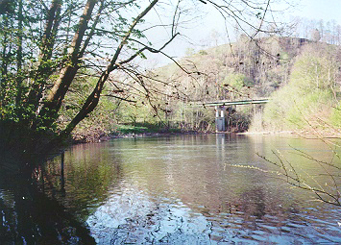
The Powell River in Arthur.

The Powell River travels through the Arthur. The river flooded the area in March 1826.

== Amenities and attractions ==
Arthur Methodist Church was organized and the first church built in 1914. Located on Old Highway 63, the current church was built in 1947. As of 1986, the church had 56 members.

The community has two cemeteries: Chumley Cemetery, which is maintained by a board of trustees comprising six Arthur residents, and Sowder Cemetery, which is located on private property and primarily serves as the final resting place for the Sowder family.

== Notable people ==
- Milton Estes, early country singer
