= Abraham Lincoln Library and Museum =

Coordinates: 36°34′50.9″N 83°39′27.1″W

The Abraham Lincoln Library and Museum in Harrogate, Tennessee and located on campus of Lincoln Memorial University, exhibits and interprets items such as the cane that Lincoln used at Ford's Theatre the night of his assassination, a collection of about 30,000 books, and art exhibits.
