= New Tazewell, Tennessee =

- City
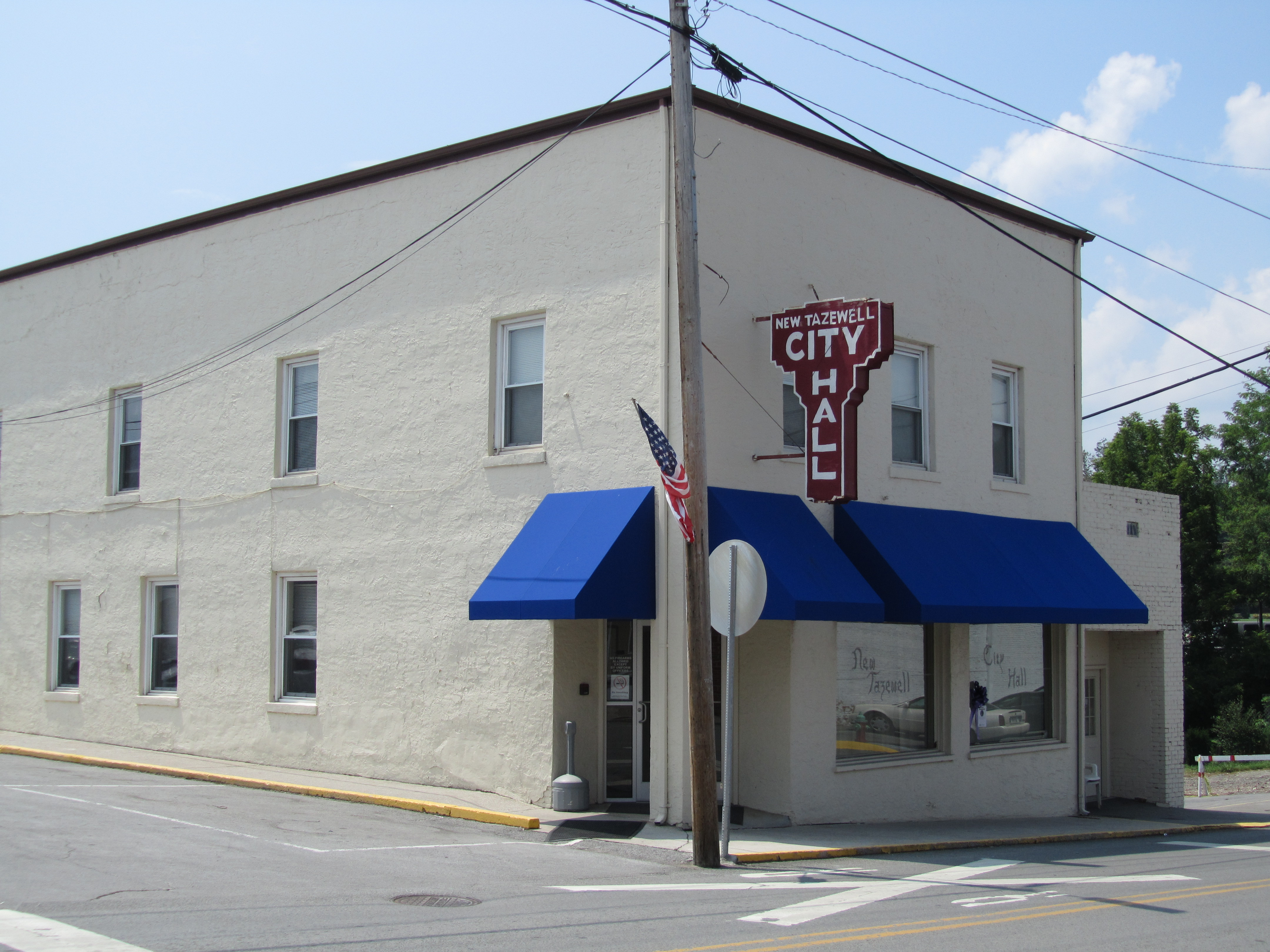
- City Hall, New Tazewell

- Flag

- Location of New Tazewell in Claiborne County, Tennessee.
- Coordinates: 36°26′16″N 83°36′27″W
- Country: United States
- State: Tennessee
- County: Claiborne
- Established: 1880s
- Incorporated: 1954

Government
  - Type: Mayor-council
  - Mayor: Jerry Beeler
  - Vice Mayor: Stanley Leonard
  - City Council: List of Councilmembers: Stanley Leonard (also Vice Mayor); Charles Brooks; Charles DeBusk; Franklin Essary; Stanley Leonard; Roger Poore

Area
  - Total: 5.07 sq mi (13.12 km^{2})
  - Land: 5.07 sq mi (13.12 km^{2})
  - Water: 0 sq mi (0.00 km^{2})
- Elevation: 1,467 ft (447 m)

Population (2020)
  - Total: 2,769
  - Density: 546.5/sq mi (211.01/km^{2})
- Time zone: UTC-5 (Eastern (EST))
  - Summer (DST): UTC-4 (EDT)
- ZIP codes: 37824-37825
- Area code: 423
- FIPS code: 47-53140
- GNIS feature ID: 1295652
- Website: http://newtazewelltn.org/

New Tazewell is a city in Claiborne County, Tennessee, United States. The population was 3,037 at the 2010 census. The population was 2,769 at the 2020 census.

== History ==
When the railroad line was built from Knoxville through Cumberland Gap in the late 1880s, it bypassed the city of Tazewell. It is uncertain whether the railroad was unable to obtain right of way, or whether the decision was made because of topography, but the railroad depot was built about two miles to the west of Tazewell. A new community sprang up around the depot, called Cowan City on old survey maps. The city was incorporated as New Tazewell in the 1920s, but the charter was voted down about fifteen years later. It was reincorporated in 1954.

== Geography ==
New Tazewell is located in central Claiborne County, adjacent to the twin city of Tazewell, at a coordinate of 36°26′16″N 83°36′27″W (36.437838, -83.607613). According to the United States Census Bureau, the city has a total area of 5.3 square miles (14 km^{2}), all land.

== Demographics ==
Historical population
Census	Pop.	Note	%±
1960	768		—
1970	1,192		55.2%
1980	1,677		40.7%
1990	1,864		11.2%
2000	2,871		54.0%
2010	3,037		5.8%
2020	2,769		−8.8%

=== 2020 census ===
New Tazewell racial composition
Race	Number	Percentage
White (non-Hispanic)	2,570	92.81%
Black or African American (non-Hispanic)	32	1.16%
Native American	10	0.36%
Asian	9	0.33%
Pacific Islander	2	0.07%
Other/Mixed	94	3.39%
Hispanic or Latino	52	1.88%

As of the 2020 United States census, there were 2,769 people, 1,293 households, and 731 families residing in the town.

=== 2000 census ===
As of the census of 2000, there were 2,871 people, 1,200 households, and 753 families residing in the city. The population density was 542.2 inhabitants per square mile (209.3/km^{2}). There were 1,414 housing units at an average density of 267.0 per square mile (103.1/km^{2}). The racial makeup of the city was 96.20% White, 1.46% African American, 0.45% Native American, 0.42% Asian, 0.77% from other races, and 0.70% from two or more races. Hispanic or Latino of any race were 1.04% of the population. There were 1,200 households, out of which 29.4% had children under the age of 18 living with them, 43.8% were married couples living together, 14.6% had a female householder with no husband present, and 37.3% were non-families. 34.1% of all households were made up of individuals, and 14.7% had someone living alone who was 65 years of age or older. The average household size was 2.30 and the average family size was 2.97.

In the city, the population was spread out, with 24.1% under the age of 18, 8.7% from 18 to 24, 27.8% from 25 to 44, 23.3% from 45 to 64, and 16.1% who were 65 years of age or older. The median age was 37 years. For every 100 females, there were 84.6 males. For every 100 females age 18 and over, there were 82.5 males.

The median income for a household in the city was $21,875, and the median income for a family was $31,458. Males had a median income of $22,181 versus $18,472 for females. The per capita income for the city was $13,619. About 24.2% of families and 29.4% of the population were below the poverty line, including 40.1% of those under age 18 and 32.1% of those age 65 or over.

== Government ==
=== Board of Mayor and Aldermen ===
New Tazewell uses the mayor-board-of-aldermen system, which was established in 1954 when the city was incorporated. It is composed of the mayor, and six aldermen. The citizens elect the mayor and four aldermen to four-year terms. The board elects a vice mayor from among the six aldermen.

=== State government ===
New Tazewell is represented in the 35th District of the Tennessee House of Representatives by William Slater, a Republican.

It is represented in the 8th District of the Tennessee Senate by Jessie Seal, also a Republican.

== Education ==
New Tazewell is home to a satellite campus of Walters State Community College.
