= Jessie Seal =

American politician (born 1991)

Member of the Tennessee Senate from the 8th district
- Incumbent
- Assumed office January 14, 2025
- Preceded by: Frank Niceley

Personal details
- Born: January 9, 1991 (age 35)
- Party: Republican
- Website: Senate website

Jessie Seal (born January 9, 1991) is an American politician. He serves as a Republican member for the 8th district in the Tennessee State Senate since 2024.

Seal is a native of Hancock County and has lived in Claiborne County for 16 years.

Following the death of Dolly Parton, Seal introduced a proposal to commemorate the singer-songwriter and her accomplishments with a special day on 25 September (9/25) a reference to her song “9 to 5.”
