= George Scarbrough =

American poet (1915–2008)

George Addison Scarbrough (October 20, 1915 – 2008) was a poet in the United States known for his Appalachian poetry from the 1930s and 1940s. Lincoln Memorial University awarded him an honorary doctorate degree.

He was born in Patty, Tennessee and studied at the University of Tennessee from 1935 to 1936 and the University of the South from 1942 to 1943. He graduated from Lincoln Memorial University in 1947 with a B.A. and in 1954 he received an M.A. from the University of Tennessee.

Scarbrough received a PEN American Branch Grant, two Carnegie Fund grants, a Borestone Mountain Award, Spirit Magazine’s Sheena Albanese Memorial Prize, the Tennessee governor’s Outstanding Tennessean Award in Literature, a Fellowship of Southern Writers’ James Still Award for Writing of the Appalachian South, Poetry's Bess Hokin Prize, and a Knoxville Writers’ Guild Career Achievement Award. He was and inducted in the East Tennessee Writers Hall of Fame. A collection of his papers are at the University of the South.

Randy Mackin of Middle Tennessee State University wrote the book George Scarbrough, Appalachian Poet about him.

== Works ==
- Tellico Blue (1948)
- The Course is Upward (1951)
- Summer So-Called (1956)
- New and Selected Poems (1977)
- A Summer Ago (1986), a novel
- and Invitation to Kim (1989)
- Under the Lemon Tree (2011), published posthumously
