= Father & Son (Bill Monroe and James Monroe album) =

Studio album by Bill and James Monroe
- Released: March 1, 1973
- Recorded: March 26, 1969; December 18, 1969; March 14–21, 1972
- Studio: Columbia Recording Studio (Nashville, Tennessee); Bradley's Barn (Mount Juliet, Tennessee)
- Genre: Bluegrass
- Length: 29:48
- Label: MCA
- Producer: Harry Silverstein; Walter Haynes

Bill Monroe chronology
Bill Monroe's Uncle Pen (1972)	Father & Son (1973)	Bill Monroe and his Blue Grass Boys (1950–60) (1973)

James Monroe chronology
Father & Son (1973)	Bean Blossom (1973)

Singles from Father & Son
- 1. "I Haven't Seen Mary in Years" Released: May 19, 1969; 2. "Bonny" Released: March 1970; 3. "Tall Pines" Released: January 29, 1973

Father & Son is the first collaboration album by American bluegrass musician Bill Monroe and his son James. Released by MCA Records on March 1, 1973, it features 11 songs recorded between March 1969 and March 1972 by multiple lineups of Bill Monroe and his Blue Grass Boys featuring James as a member. Three tracks from the album were issued as singles: "I Haven't Seen Mary in Years" in May 1969, "Bonny" in March 1970, and "Tall Pines" in January 1973.

== Background ==
Bill Monroe's son James first started playing with the Blue Grass Boys in June 1964, featuring as an occasional bassist while he learned the instrument, similar to how Bessie Lee Mauldin had been introduced to the lineup. Within a few months, he became a full-time member of the band. By March 1969, James had taken over as guitarist and lead vocalist of the Blue Grass Boys', following Roland White's departure; he later recalled that "I wasn't ready for the guitar job. I had never done much with the guitar. I knew that job was going to be hard." Later that year, the single "I Haven't Seen Mary in Years" was released as the first recording by the group featuring "Bill Monroe & James Monroe" as the credited artists, rather than the Blue Grass Boys or simply Bill Monroe. This was the first indication of an upcoming album by the pair.

James Monroe left the Blue Grass Boys in April 1971 to form his own band, the Midnight Ramblers. Speaking about the decision to leave, he recalled in later years: "I felt that I was ready. I had some new material and wanted to get a different sound from a lot of the bands. It also gave me a chance to sing more."

== Recording ==
Two tracks featured on Father & Son were taken from Blue Grass Boys sessions during 1969 — "I Haven't Seen Mary in Years", the first single officially credited to the father and son duo, and "Bonny", a track recorded at the end of the year and released in early 1970 credited solely to James Monroe.

Recording for the album officially took place over the course of three sessions in March 1972. James was given "full rein" to direct the performances, which reportedly included favoring a "softer, more contemporary sound combining less-aggressive guitar playing [and] melodic banjo picking". With the rest of Bill Monroe's Blue Grass Boys lineup of the time — Jack Hicks on banjo, Kenny Baker on fiddle and Monroe Fields on bass — the father and son duo produced two new recordings on March 14: Bill Monroe and Lester Flatt's "Sweetheart You Done Me Wrong", originally recorded by the "classic lineup" of Monroe's band; and murder ballad "Banks of the Ohio", previously recorded by Monroe and brother Charlie. James also overdubbed a new lead vocal track on "Tall Pines", a yet-unreleased recording from October 1969.

The band returned to the studio the next day and recorded four more songs, including two more Monroe Brothers standards (A. P. Carter's "Foggy Mountain Top" and James H. Carr and F. J. Barry's "What Would You Give in Exchange?"), another Blue Grass Boys "classic lineup" track (the Bill Monroe original "Mother's Only Sleeping") and Reno and Smiley's "Love, Please Come Home". The final session for the album took place on March 21, 1972, and featured Blue Grass Boys guitarist Joe Stuart on third fiddle; the last two songs recorded were Albert Price's "When the Golden Leaves Begin to Fall" (originally recorded by Bill Monroe in 1950) and the original "Walls of Time" (originally recorded, but not released, in 1968). The session ended with a new recording of "My Old Kentucky and You" with Stuart on guitar.

== Release ==
Prior to the release of Father & Son, "Tall Pines" and "Foggy Mountain Top" from the March 1972 sessions were released as a single on January 29, 1973. The album followed on March 1, 1973 — Bill Monroe's first album on MCA Records, which had officially absorbed Decca Records that day. Bill and James would continue to tour together on numerous occasions, before recording as a duo again in early 1978 for a follow-up to Father & Son entitled Together Again.

== Track listing ==
Father & Son track listing
No.	Title	Writer(s)	Length
1.	"I Haven't Seen Mary in Years" (recorded March 26, 1969)	Damon Black	3:00
2.	"Love, Please Come Home" (recorded March 15, 1972)	Leon Jackson	2:10
3.	"When the Golden Leaves Begin to Fall" (recorded March 21, 1972)	Albert Price	2:46
4.	"Tall Pines" (recorded October 28, 1969 and March 14, 1972)	Black	2:55
5.	"Banks of the Ohio" (recorded March 14, 1972)	Traditional, arr. Bruce Welch, John Farrar	3:05
6.	"Mother's Only Sleeping" (recorded March 15, 1972)	Bill Monroe	2:55
7.	"Foggy Mountain Top" (recorded March 15, 1972)	A. P. Carter	2:10
8.	"Walls of Time" (recorded March 21, 1972)	Monroe	2:48
9.	"Bonny" (recorded December 17, 1969)	Juanita Southern	2:02
10.	"Sweetheart You Done Me Wrong" (recorded March 14, 1972)	Lester Flatt; Monroe	2:30
11.	"What Would You Give in Exchange?" (recorded March 15, 1972)	James H. Carr; F. J. Barry	3:27
Total length:			29:48

== Personnel ==
Track 1 (recorded March 26, 1969)

- Bill Monroe — mandolin, tenor vocals
- James Monroe — guitar, lead vocals
- Rual Yarbrough — banjo
- Kenny Baker — fiddle
- Joe "Red" Hayes — fiddle
- Joe Zinkan — string bass

Tracks 4 and 9 (recorded October/December 1969)

- Bill Monroe — mandolin, tenor vocals
- James Monroe — guitar, lead vocals
- Rual Yarbrough — banjo
- Kenny Baker — fiddle
- Joe "Red" Hayes — fiddle (track 4)
- Bill Yates — string bass

Tracks 2–8, 10 and 11 (recorded March 1972)

- Bill Monroe — mandolin, vocals (tenor on all tracks; lead on 3, 6 and 7)
- James Monroe — guitar, lead vocals
- Jack Hicks — banjo
- Kenny Baker — fiddle
- Tommy Williams — fiddle
- Joe Stuart — fiddle (tracks 3 and 8)
- Monroe Fields — string bass

== Bibliography ==
- Ewing, Tom (September 7, 2018), Bill Monroe: The Life and Music of the Blue Grass Man (Music in American Life), Champaign, Illinois: University of Illinois Press, ISBN 978-0252041891
