= Clouds, Tennessee =

Unincorporated community in Tennessee, US

Coordinates: 36°27′33″N 83°38′57″W

Clouds is an unincorporated community in Claiborne County, Tennessee.

== History ==
A post office called Clouds was established in 1913, and remained in operation until 1954. The community has the name of an early settler.
