= Alexander Arthur =

American businessman

- Born: August 30, 1846; Glasgow, Scotland
- Died: March 4, 1912 (aged 65); Middlesboro, Kentucky, USA
- Occupation(s): Business, Engineering
- Spouses: Mary Forrest; Nellie Goodwin
- Parent(s): Alexander Arthur and Catherine Allen

Alexander Alan Arthur (August 30, 1846 – March 4, 1912) was a Scottish-born engineer and entrepreneur active primarily in the southeastern United States in the latter half of the 19th century. Flamboyant, charismatic, and energetic, Arthur used his prominent American and European financial connections to fund numerous business ventures, most of which were overly ambitious and ultimately failed. A proponent of economic advancement in what became known as the New South, Arthur played a primary role in the development of the Cumberland Gap area, and in the course of his endeavors established the cities of Middlesboro, Kentucky and Harrogate, Tennessee. The community of Arthur, Tennessee, is named for him.

After spending his early life migrating back and forth between Scotland, Canada, and Scandinavia, Arthur moved to Boston in 1879, and accepted a position as the general manager of the Scottish-Carolina Timber and Land Company's American operations. In the early 1880s, Arthur identified a rich stand of timber in the upper Blue Ridge Mountains along the Tennessee-North Carolina border, and devised a boom system to extract the timber from the difficult mountain terrain. Later in the same decade, Arthur identified the abundant iron ore deposits in the Cumberland Gap region, and established a multimillion-dollar iron production operation in hopes of making Middlesboro the "Pittsburgh of the South."

While he never experienced great financial success, Arthur's endeavors were a harbinger of the great logging and mining operations that became major economic forces in Southern Appalachia in the early 20th century.

== Biography ==
=== Early life ===
Alexander Arthur was born in Glasgow, Scotland, the eldest son of Alexander and Catherine Allen Arthur. While Alexander was still a child, the Arthurs moved to Montreal, Canada, although Arthur returned to Glasgow within a few years to attend school. In 1867, Arthur joined the 167th Highlander Regiment, and during the same period married his first wife, Mary Forrest. Arthur moved several times throughout the following decade, living in Norway and Sweden before immigrating to the U.S. city of Boston in 1879. After the death of his first wife, Arthur married Boston socialite Nellie Goodwin, who introduced him to numerous New England financial connections.

=== Scottish-Carolina Timber and Land Company ===
In the early 1880s, Arthur, working in Knoxville, Tennessee as an agent for the Glasgow-based Scottish-Carolina Timber and Land Company, concocted a plan to harvest the dense, virgin forests of the Pigeon River Valley on the northern fringe of the Great Smoky Mountains east of Knoxville. While these mountains contained one of the richest timber stands in the eastern United States, their general remoteness and rugged terrain had left them mostly untouched by loggers for much of the 19th century. Arthur's plan called for harvested logs to be floated down the Pigeon River in a controlled fashion using a series of logging booms.

Arthur chose the small community of Newport, near where the Pigeon River exits the high mountains and enters the upper Tennessee Valley, as a base for his logging operations. Company employees and specialists from as far away as South Africa arrived to begin building the booms, and by 1884 the company had begun accumulating logs in its boom reservoirs. Historian Wilma Dykeman described Arthur during this period as the "epitome of elegance," moving about in a Prince Albert coat and "lord mayor air." Dykeman said of Arthur:

... he rode, lord and master, on a shiny black stump-tailed horse over his domain, never settling the bulk of his weight into the saddle, but always standing in the stirrups as if personally overseeing in the wilderness the birth of empire.

Arthur built a large house in Newport— known as "The Mansion"— and made plans to redesign the rough frontier village as an ideal community, complete with parks, clubhouses, hotels, a new town hall, and a college. However, Arthur underestimated the volatility of Appalachian Mountain streams, which swell to many times their size after heavy rains. In Spring 1886, a cloudburst dumped torrential rains into the upper Pigeon Valley, and the river flooded, threatening the boom that held the company's stock of logs. Arthur spent 12 hours in the pouring rain directing efforts to save the boom, but it eventually collapsed, and the logs scattered for miles downstream. An investigation by Scottish Timber blamed Arthur for the loss, determining that he should have foreseen such a flood, and the entire operation folded shortly afterward.

=== American Association, Ltd. ===
In 1885, Arthur travelled to Cumberland Gap (at the junction of Tennessee, Virginia, and Kentucky) to report on the feasibility of building a railroad in the area, and was impressed by the abundant iron ore and coal deposits in the Yellow Creek Valley, on the Kentucky side of the Gap. Arthur initially tried to interest the Richmond and Danville Railroad in establishing an iron production operation in the area, but after failing to do so, he took the initiative himself. In August 1886, he and several investors formed the Gap Associates, and purchased 20,000 acres (8,100 ha) in Bell County, Kentucky. The following year, after gaining major funding from London, Arthur's investment group was reorganized as the American Association, Ltd., and Arthur continued purchasing land in the region, eventually acquiring upwards of 100,000 acres (40,000 ha).

Arthur established a new company town— named "Middlesboro" after Middlesbrough, England— in the Yellow Creek Valley, and built furnaces to convert the ore into pig iron, and coke ovens to convert the mined coal into coke. Arthur then formed the Knoxville, Cumberland Gap, and Louisville Railroad to build a spur line to Middlesboro which would transport the pig iron and coke out of the valley. To house the workers needed to build a railroad tunnel through a mountainside near the Gap, Arthur set up a work camp at Cumberland Gap, Tennessee in early 1888. The railroad's inaugural train ran on August 23, 1889, with several prominent Knoxvillians on board, among them Knox County judge George Andrews, Sheriff Andrew Reeder, attorney William F. Yardley, and businessmen Peter Kern, W. W. Woodruff, and Frank Hockenjos. Just outside Knoxville, however, the train derailed, killing six, including Andrews, Reeder, and Hockenjos, and injuring several others, including Arthur, Kern, and Woodruff.

By 1890, Arthur and American Association, Ltd. had spent twenty million dollars on the Cumberland Gap operation, and Arthur's British backers, among them the British Steel Syndicate, began to grow skeptical of Arthur's grand schemes and outrageous spending. They grew even more concerned when the ore deposits in the Yellow Creek Valley were determined to be of low grade, and after the failure of Baring Brothers in 1891, Arthur's British financiers backed out of American Association. The company struggled forward until the Panic of 1893 in the American stock markets brought about a total collapse. American Association's assets were liquidated, with tens of thousand of acres around Middlesboro selling for just fifteen thousand dollars.

=== Harrogate ===
Believing Middlesboro would one day grow into a great industrial center, Arthur decided to establish a suburb for the city's future elite on the Tennessee side of the Cumberland Gap. He named it "Harrogate" after the resort town of Harrogate in England. In 1888, Arthur built a large house for himself in Harrogate, and American Association, Ltd. spent two million dollars developing the area. By far the most lavish feature of the new community was the Four Seasons, a 700-room resort hotel believed to have been the largest hotel in the United States at the time of its completion. The hotel included a sanitarium, a casino, an extravagant lobby, and an elegant 50-foot (15 m) by 160-foot (49 m) dining room. A smaller hotel was built at the nearby Cumberland Gap community.

Arthur advertised the Four Seasons resort far and wide, but the hotel's remote location and distance from the railroad made it less desirable to the nation's wealthy. At times, the hotel's large staff outnumbered guests by a 15 to 1 margin. After the collapse of its parent company in 1893, the hotel was sold for just twenty-five thousand dollars and dismantled.

=== Later life ===
His Middlesboro project in shambles, Arthur nevertheless sought to begin anew, and established his small namesake crossroads community along the railroad south of Cumberland Gap, but the lack of financing in the mid-1890s doomed any real chance of obtaining the success Arthur desired. In 1897, Arthur travelled to Alaska to join the Klondike Gold Rush, and eventually settled in New York. After suffering a stroke, however, he moved back to Middlesboro, where he decided to live out his remaining years. He died March 4, 1912, and is buried in a family plot in the Middlesboro Cemetery.

== Legacy ==
Arthur understood the great wealth that could be obtained from extracting the abundant natural resources of the Southern Appalachian Mountains, but even with million-dollar financing, the lack of technology and inaccessibility of the region proved too much to overcome. It was not until the invention of the Shay locomotive and the steam-powered skidder that large-scale logging of the mountains' timber became profitable. In the early 1900s, firms such as the Little River Lumber Company and Champion Fibre saw enormous returns logging the timber stands Arthur had attempted to reach decades earlier. Likewise, by the time of Arthur's death, the mountains north of Middlesboro had become one of the world's great coal mining regions.

In 1897, a group led by General O. O. Howard and Reverend A. A. Myers established Lincoln Memorial University on what remained of the Four Seasons property in Harrogate. The school set up a conservatory in Arthur's house, although an observation tower is all that presently remains of the structure. Affluent Cocke Countians used Arthur's Newport house for decades after his departure, and Scottish Timber's Newport office became a notorious saloon known as the "Last Chance/First Chance." The old Arthur, Tennessee post office is currently on display at the Museum of Appalachia in Norris, Tennessee. With more than 10,000 residents, Middlesboro remains one of the more prominent cities in Southeastern Kentucky.
