= Jimmie Selph =

American musician (1915–2000)

James Coin Self (June 23, 1915 – December 28, 2000) was a versatile American country music, rockabilly and bluegrass musician and occasional vocalist whose career peaked during the late 1940s–1950s. He played guitar, drums, accordion, and steel guitar. His names are occasionally seen professionally as variously Jimmy and/or Self.

== Biography ==
Selph's first release was in 1947 on the Majestic Records label. He was a member of Curley Williams' band, with whom he recorded several albums. He also appeared with Dottie Dillard. On the Coin label he released titles including "Tom Catin' Around" (1956). He was also a drummer for Hank Thompson and a singer with Milton Estes and the Musical Millers. Selph also recorded on Bullet Records, including "Dream Castles Shared With You" and "Time's A-Wasting, Little Darling". Selph's vocal releases included "That's Why I Worry" and "Say You'll Be Mine". He appeared on and toured with The Grand Ole Opry beginning in the mid-1940s.

In 1955, he was a member of the house band on ABC-TV's Ozark Jubilee (originally known as the Crossroads Boys) with Grady Martin, Bob Moore and Bud Isaccs before he returned to Nashville, Tennessee. As a Nashville and Hollywood session musician, he backed Red Foley, Don Gibson, Webb Pierce, Ray Price, Molly O'Day and The Browns.

Selph is often confused in discographies with Texas swing and rockabilly singer Jimmy "Dean" Self, whose career was active around the same time as Selph's.

== Discography ==
Year	Title	Label
1947	"That’s Why I Worry"/"I’m Writing You Darling Through Tears"	Majestic Records
1947	"Little Boy’s Letter To Santa Claus"/"Easy To Please"	Majestic Records
19??	"S-U-N-D-A-Y"/"Stars and Stripes Forever"	Capitol Records
19??	"Empty Arms and Broken Hearts"/"I’m Just Plain Lonesome"	Capitol Records
1956	"Tom Catin’ Around"/"You’ve Been Gone So Long"	Coin Records
