= Milton Estes =

American singer-songwriter

- Born: Milton Esco Estes; May 9, 1914; Arthur, Tennessee, United States
- Origin: Nashville, Tennessee, United States
- Died: August 23, 1963 (aged 49) Oklahoma City, Oklahoma, United States
- Genres: Country; Southern gospel
- Occupation(s): Singer; Master of ceremonies Caller; Songwriter
- Instrument(s): Voice; Bass; Guitar; Mandolin; Piano
- Years active: 1937–1963
- Formerly of: Pee Wee King; Bill Monroe

Milton Esco Estes (May 9, 1914 – August 23, 1963) was an American country music and Southern gospel singer and musician. Estes was a host and house performer at the Grand Ole Opry.

== Early life ==
Milton Esco Estes was born on May 9, 1914, in Arthur, Tennessee.

== Career ==
Estes moved to Nashville, Tennessee, and in 1937, he debuted as a singer and MC at the Grand Ole Opry with Pee Wee King's Golden West Cowboys. With Pee Wee King, he performed with Tommy Sosebee, Redd Stewart, Eddy Arnold and Cowboy Copas. Estes sang bass.

In 1941, Estes moved from Nashville to Raleigh, North Carolina. He left country music and began performing Southern gospel music. He became lead singer for Lone Star Quartet, a group originally from Texas. The group was popular in Raleigh and were regulars on WPTF. In 1946, Estes moved back to Nashville and began performing in country music again, though he often wove gospel music into his country performances. He was a main performer for the Grand Ole Opry and bandleader of the Musical Millers. As Milton Estes and his Musical Millers, he recorded ten singles, and four solo, for Decca Records in 1947 and 1949, including a cover of "A House of Gold". He also hosted the Martha White sponsored segments as the "flour peddler". Estes also hosted morning and afternoon radio shows, including Noontime Neighbors with Owen Bradley, on WSM. On WSM, his guests included Lew Childre and Jimmie Selph.

In the 1950s, Estes co-wrote "20/20 Vision and Walking Around Blind" with Joe Allison. The song was recorded by Gene Autry and Jimmy Martin. Estes was also a square dance caller. He called dances at the Opry and also performed on square dancing music records. Estes moved to Detroit in 1953, where he promoted Grand Ole Opry musicians and MC'd the Motor City Jamboree. In 1954, he recorded vocals on four Bill Monroe and the Blues Grass Boys singles, including recordings of I'm Working on a Building. He relocated to Columbus, Georgia, where he worked as a television announcer.

== Later life ==
By the time of his death on August 23, 1963, Estes was living in Oklahoma City.

In 2022, American animator Nina Paley made a music video for "When the Fire Comes Down" performed by Milton Estes and His Musical Millers. The video used animations from Paley's project Apocalypse Animated.
