= Lincoln Memorial University =

Private university in Harrogate, Tennessee, U.S.

- Motto: "We Wear His Name Proudly"; On seal: "With malice toward none, with charity for all"
- Type: Private university
- Established: February 12, 1897; 129 years ago
- Accreditation: SACS
- Academic affiliations: NAICU
- Endowment: $55.1 million (2024)
- President: Jason McConnell
- Academic staff: 310 full-time, 273 part-time
- Administrative staff: 152
- Students: 6,081
- Undergraduates: 1,668
- Postgraduates: 4,413
- Location: Harrogate, Tennessee, United States; 36.5808°N 83.6566°W
- Campus: 1,000 acres (4.0 km^{2}); Distant town
- Other campuses: Brandon; Chattanooga; Corbin; Ewing; Knoxville; Lexington; Orange Park
- Colors: Dark blue and light gray
- Nickname: Railsplitters (Splitters)
- Sporting affiliations: NCAA Division II - South Atlantic; Conference Carolinas; Independent
- Mascot: Abe
- Website: lmunet.edu

Lincoln Memorial University (LMU) is a private university in Harrogate, Tennessee, United States. Its 1,000-acre (4.0 km^{2}) main campus borders on Cumberland Gap National Historical Park. As of fall 2023, it had 1,668 undergraduate and 4,413 graduate and professional students. LMU is accredited by the Southern Association of Colleges and Schools.

== History ==
In the 1880s, an entrepreneur named Alexander Arthur and several associates established a firm called American Association, Ltd., the primary purpose of which was to develop the iron ore and coal resources of the Cumberland Gap area. Arthur founded Middlesboro, Kentucky, for the company's employees and furnaces, and constructed a railroad line connecting Middlesboro with Knoxville, Tennessee. Arthur believed Middlesboro would grow into a large industrial city, the so-called "Pittsburgh of the South." In 1888, he founded the city of Harrogate, which he envisioned would someday be a suburb for Middlesboro's elite.

Arthur and American Association spent some two million dollars developing Harrogate, the jewel of which was the Four Seasons Hotel, a 700-room structure believed to have been the largest hotel in the U.S. at the time. The hotel included a lavish dining hall, a casino, and a separate sanitarium. The economic panic of the early 1890s and the subsequent collapse of Arthur's London financial backers doomed American Associates and the Four Seasons was sold and dismantled.

In 1896, General Oliver O. Howard, a former Union officer who had helped establish Howard University (named for him), embarked on a lecture tour. Howard's agent, Cyrus Kehr, suggested Howard establish a university as a living memorial to President Abraham Lincoln. On June 18, 1896, Howard spoke at the Harrow School, an elementary school at Cumberland Gap founded a few years earlier by Reverend A. A. Myers. After the lecture, Myers asked Howard for assistance in establishing a college for the Cumberland Gap region. Howard related to Myers a conversation he had with Lincoln in 1863 in which the president expressed a desire to do something to help the people of East Tennessee, a majority of whom remained loyal to the Union during the Civil War in spite of the greater state's secession, and, remembering Kehr's suggestion, agreed to help Myers establish a university in Lincoln's honor.

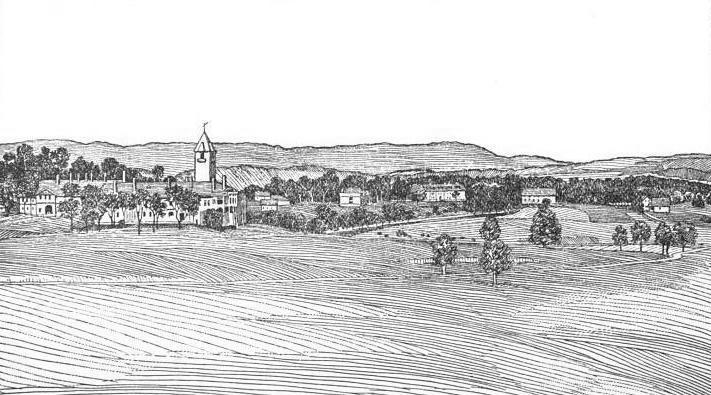
Lincoln Memorial University, c. 1915

With the help of Howard and Kehr, Myers purchased the Four Seasons property, although the sanitarium building was all that remained of the once lavish hotel. Lincoln Memorial University was chartered on February 12, 1897—Lincoln's 88th birthday—with Cyrus Kehr as its first president. Howard joined the university as its managing director in 1898, and under his leadership the university expanded, acquiring among other places Alexander Arthur's house, which the university used as a conservatory. Howard mentioned the university and its purpose in a speech at Carnegie Hall in 1901, which helped raise money and allowed the university to pay off its debts.

In 1902, the sanitarium building burned, and its surviving blocks were used to build Grant-Lee Hall, which has since been placed on the National Register of Historic Places. Arthur's house also burned, but its tower, now called "Conservatory Tower", still stands. In April 1917, British folklorist Cecil Sharp spent several days at Lincoln Memorial University, where he collected 22 local versions of "old world" ballads such as "Lord Thomas and Fair Ellinor", "The Daemon Lover", and "Lady Isabel and the Elf Knight."

LMU is known for a rich literary history that includes such renowned authors as James Still (River of Earth, The Wolfpen Poems), Jesse Stuart (Taps for Private Tussie, The Thread That Runs So True), Don West (Clods of Southern Earth), and George Scarbrough (Tellico Blue). At one point, Emma Bell Miles, author and painter, served as Artist-in-Residence at the university, a position that went unfilled until it was taken over by bestselling novelist Silas House (Clay's Quilt, The Coal Tattoo) in 2005. House started the Mountain Heritage Literary Festival that same year and the gathering has grown steadily, featuring the region's most celebrated writers (Lee Smith, Earl Hamner, Jr., Ron Rash, Sheila Kay Adams, Denise Giardina, etc.) and becoming one of the premier events of Appalachian literature. Lincoln Memorial University is also home to the Grant Lee Literary Society, which spawned the still surviving Gamma Lambda Sigma Fraternity.

== Academics ==
=== Duncan School of Law ===
In the spring of 2008, Lincoln Memorial University announced plans to seek approval to offer legal education leading to the Juris Doctor degree. The law school, named in honor of Tennessee Congressman John James Duncan, Jr., is located in downtown Knoxville, Tennessee in the building commonly referred to as "Old City Hall". The entering class of the Fall 2011 full-time program had an average LSAT score of 147 while the part-time program had an average LSAT score of 145. These scores represent 33rd and 26th percentile of all LSAT test takers. The average GPA for the entering class of 2011 is 3.01 for the full-time program and 2.99 for the part-time program.

In February 2009, the law school received approval from the Tennessee Board of Law Examiners, which allows Duncan School of Law graduates to apply to take the Tennessee Bar Examination. LMU's law school has 231 students. In December 2011, the American Bar Association refused the school's application for provisional accreditation. In reaction, the Duncan School sued the ABA, alleging that the ABA was using accreditation to limit the production of new lawyers, thus violating federal antitrust laws. In January 2012, after a judge denied the school's requests for an injunction and temporary restraining order against the ABA, the school filed an appeal with the ABA. As a result of the ABA's denial of provisional accreditation, numerous students withdrew or sought to transfer from Duncan School of Law.

In February 2012, Duncan School of Law was sued by a former student for "negligent enrollment." The case was dismissed in 2013. LMU-DSOL was granted full accreditation on March 1, 2019. LMU-DSOL's 2021 first-time bar passage rate was 50.67%. Of the 2020 graduating class, 62.7% secured full-time long-term bar passage required or JD-advantage employment within 10 months of graduation.

=== DeBusk College of Osteopathic Medicine ===
The initial plans to open Lincoln Memorial University-DeBusk College of Osteopathic Medicine (LMU-DCOM) began in 2004. Autry O.V. Pete DeBusk, the Chairman of the LMU Board of Trustees and LMU alumnus, was interested in starting a college of osteopathic medicine at LMU. After conducting a year-long feasibility study, LMU announced it was pursuing the development of a college of osteopathic medicine and named Ray Stowers, D.O., F.A.C.O.F.P., a rural family physician, as vice president and dean. The college was named DeBusk College of Osteopathic Medicine in honor of its initiator. The four-story, 105,000-square-foot (9,800 m^{2}) building was opened to its inaugural class of osteopathic medical students on August 1, 2007.

The DeBusk College of Osteopathic Medicine offers two degrees, a Doctor of Osteopathic Medicine, and a Master of Science in Physician Assistant Studies. The college is accredited by the Commission on Osteopathic College Accreditation (COCA) and the Commission on Colleges of the Southern Association of Colleges and Schools.

=== Richard A. Gillespie College of Veterinary Medicine ===
The LMU College of Veterinary Medicine welcomed its inaugural class in 2014 and achieved American Veterinary Medical Association accreditation in January 2019. Though many classes and research facilities are located on the main LMU campus in the Richard A. Gillespie College of Veterinary Medicine building (completed in 2020), the College of Veterinary Medicine's hands-on educational facilities are located 12 miles from Harrogate in Ewing, Virginia. The DeBusk Veterinary Teaching Center (DVTC) is housed on 700 acres and provides extensive practical experience and educational opportunities with a wide variety of species. The Large Animal Component of the DVTC provides a working farm environment with a large herd of cattle, and provides a hands-on education site where anatomy, clinical, and surgical skills are taught for dogs, cats, horses, cattle, and sheep.

=== College of Dental Medicine ===
Lincoln Memorial's College of Dental Medicine welcomed its inaugural class in 2022. It is located in the former St. Mary's building in Knoxville, Tennessee. The program is four year and awards the Doctor of Dental Medicine degree.

=== Carter and Moyers School of Education ===
The education program offers degrees in Undergraduate Teacher education, Elementary Education, Secondary Education, Special Education, Initial Teacher Licensure (MEd), Leadership and Instructional Practice (MEd), Professional Counseling (MEd), Educational Specialist, and Doctor of Education (EdD). Lincoln Memorial University pioneered the first three-year bachelors degree for K-5 education. This degree launched in fall of 2026.

=== Caylor School of Nursing ===
The nursing program was established in 1974 with the Associate of Nursing (ASN) degree program. The RN-to Bachelor of Science in Nursing (RN-to-BSN) program was added in 1987. The Master of Science in Nursing (MSN) program was introduced in 2006, and the Bachelor of Science in Nursing (BSN) program began in 2010.

The Caylor School of Nursing at Lincoln Memorial University is located on the university's main campus in Harrogate, Tennessee. The school also operates additional sites in Tampa, Florida; Chattanooga, Tennessee; Knoxville, Tennessee; and Corbin, Kentucky.

=== J. Frank White Academy ===
Founded in 1989, the J. Frank White Academy (JFWA) is a college preparatory school at Lincoln Memorial University. The academy provides college preparatory education to students in kindergarten through grade twelve. Included in tuition, qualifying Academy juniors and seniors can take up to 30 hours of LMU classes for dual or college credit.

=== Abraham Lincoln Library and Museum ===
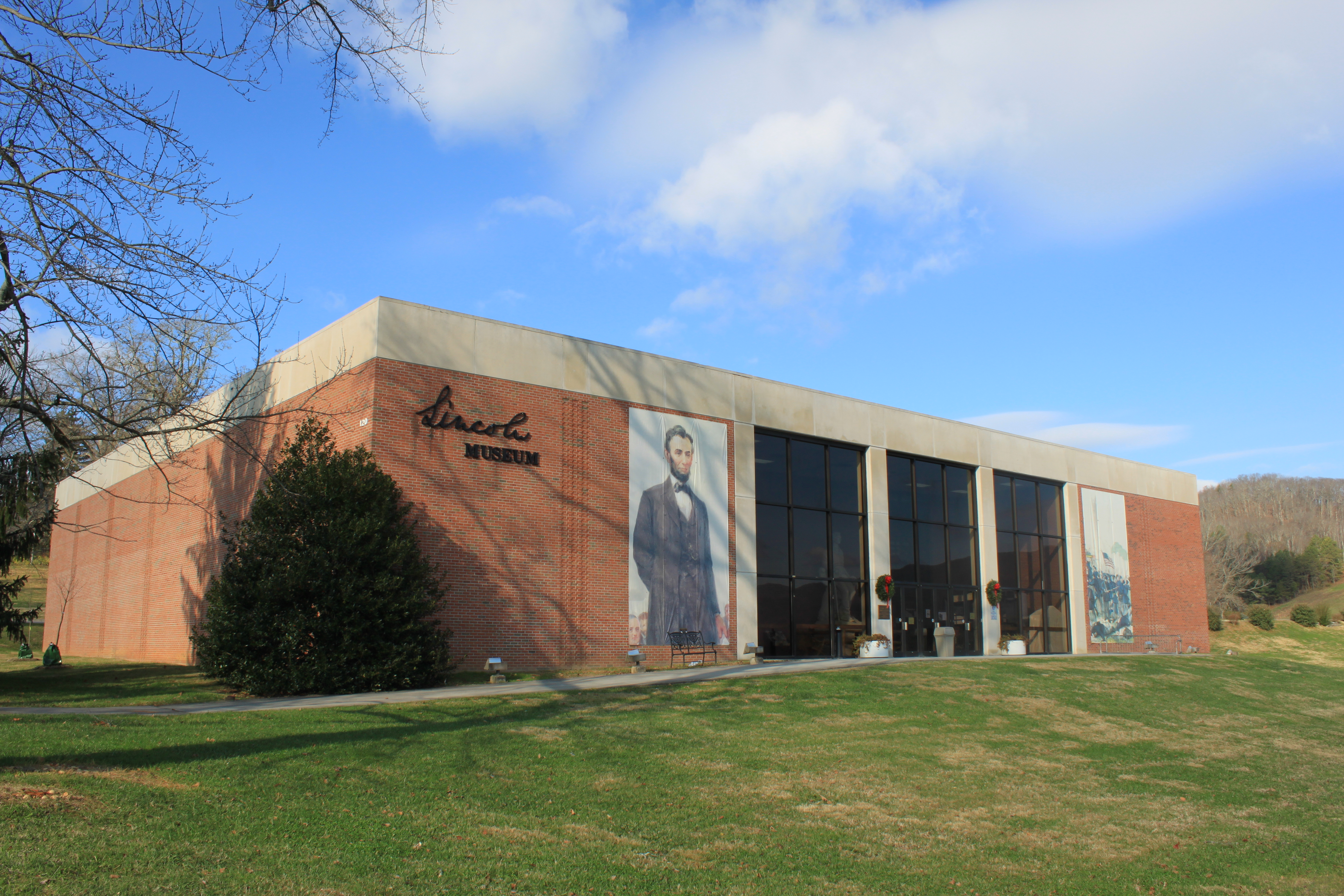
Lincoln Library and Museum

The university's Abraham Lincoln Library and Museum displays and interprets a large collection of memorabilia relating to the school's namesake, Abraham Lincoln, and the Civil War. The collection was initially formed from donations by the school's early benefactor, General Oliver O. Howard, and his friends.

== Athletics ==
LMU sports teams, called the "Railsplitters", compete in NCAA Division II in the South Atlantic Conference. Athletics have been a part of LMU since 1907, when baseball was first organized on campus.

LMU currently competes in 22 sports. Men's sports are: baseball, basketball, cross country, golf, lacrosse, soccer, tennis, track & field, volleyball, and wrestling. Women's sports are: basketball, cross country, field hockey, golf, lacrosse, soccer, softball, tennis, track & field, volleyball, and wrestling. Men's volleyball is a single-division NCAA sports. The university also offers cheerleading.

Facilities include the Turner Arena, Mary Mars Gymnasium, Dorothy Neely Field (Softball), Lamar Hennon Field (Baseball), LMU Soccer Complex, LMU Lacrosse Complex, LMU Tennis Complex, LMU Indoor Tennis Center, and LMU Golf Complex. The golf teams are based out of Woodlake Golf Club in Tazewell, Tennessee.

== Notable alumni ==
- Dan Bradbury, professional golfer on the PGA European Tour
- Autry O.V. Pete DeBusk, founder and owner of DeRoyal Industries
- John Rice Irwin, historian, founder of the Museum of Appalachia
- Maurice Natanson, American philosopher
- Nelson Pizarro, 2007 All American, Major League Soccer player
- Scot Shields, Major League Baseball pitcher
- Ralph Stanley, bluegrass artist
- James Still, Appalachian poet, novelist and folklorist
- Jesse Stuart, author
- Emanuel Terry, National Basketball Association player
- Don West, writer, civil-rights activist

Ross Samuel Carter, Paratrooper and author of Those Devils in Baggy Pants (1951). LMU Class of 1941. https://library.lmunet.edu/archives/mss036
