= Harrogate, Tennessee =

City in Claiborne County, Tennessee, United States

- City
- City of Harrogate
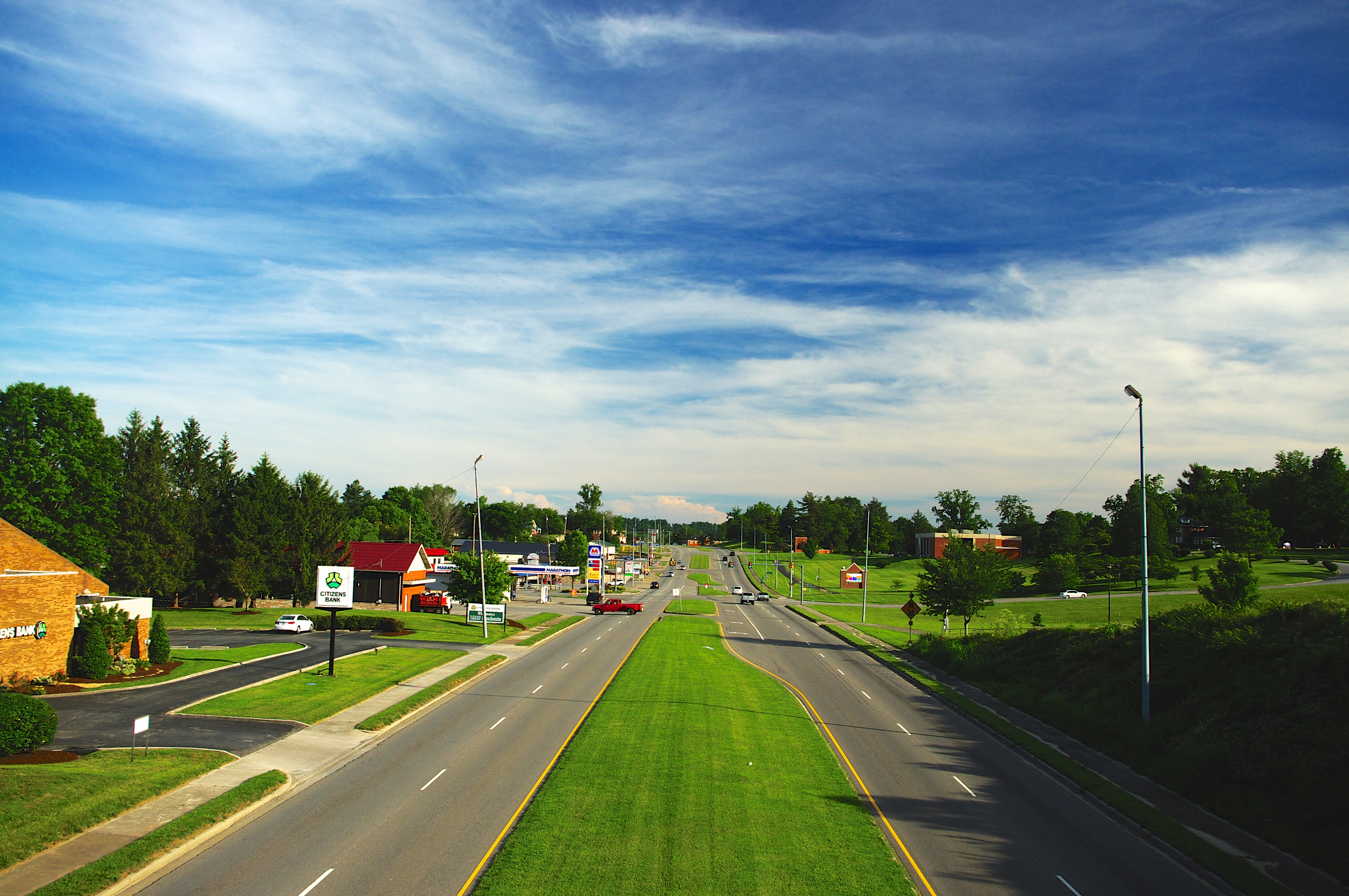
- Businesses in Harrogate along US 25E/SR 32, as viewed from LMU overhead walkway

- Flag Seal

- Location of Harrogate in Claiborne County, Tennessee.
- Coordinates: 36°34′56″N 83°39′25″W
- Country: United States
- State: Tennessee
- County: Claiborne
- Founded: 1888
- Incorporated: 1993
- Founded by: Alexander Arthur
- Named after: Harrogate, England

Government
  - Type: Mayor-council
  - Mayor: Linda Fultz
  - Vice Mayor: Allen Hurst
  - City Council: Councilmembers: Allen Hurst (also Vice Mayor); Gary Burchett; Lieven Cox; Troy Poore

Area
  - Total: 7.27 sq mi (18.82 km^{2})
  - Land: 7.27 sq mi (18.82 km^{2})
  - Water: 0 sq mi (0.00 km^{2}) 0.0%
- Elevation: 1,253 ft (382 m)

Population (2020)
  - Total: 4,400
  - Density: 605.7/sq mi (233.85/km^{2})
- Time zone: UTC-5 (EST)
  - Summer (DST): UTC-4 (EDT)
- ZIP code: 37724, 37752
- Area code: 423
- GNIS feature ID: 2403807
- Website: www.harrogate-tn.com

Harrogate is the largest city in Claiborne County, Tennessee, United States. It is adjacent to Cumberland Gap National Historical Park.

The community has been known as "Harrogate" since the 19th century, but did not incorporate by that name until 1993. As of the 2020 census, Harrogate had a population of 4,400. It is considered a college town with Lincoln Memorial University's main campus located entirely within Harrogate.

Before incorporation, the United States Census Bureau treated Harrogate as a census-designated place (CDP) called Harrogate-Shawanee. At the time of the 2000 census the CDP had a population of 2,865.

== History ==
In 1974, the population of Harrogate continued to grow at a fast pace, leading to the construction of a new middle school serving both students of Harrogate and the adjacent town of Cumberland Gap. In 1993, Harrogate was incorporated into a city, and continued to see the fastest population growth of all in Claiborne County. Lincoln Memorial University saw growth as new dorms, an athletic arena, new classrooms, a medical program, and a partnership with Japan's Kanto International Senior High School enhanced the Harrogate campus.

By the late 2000s, the city would construct a sewage treatment system following increased contaminations of groundwater and instances of human waste surfacing from failing septic tank systems.

== Geography ==
Harrogate is located at 36°34′56″N 83°39′25″W (37.811324, -82.806780). According to the United States Census Bureau, the city has a total area of 7.26 square miles (18.8 km^{2}), all land.

The unincorporated community of Shawanee, is located east inside of the city limits of Harrogate.

== Demographics ==
Historical population
Census	Pop.	Note	%±
2000	2,865		—
2010	4,389		53.2%
2020	4,400		0.3%

=== 2020 census ===
As of the 2020 census, Harrogate had a population of 4,400 people, 1,563 households, and 1,039 families. The median age was 35.7 years; 12.1% of residents were under the age of 18 and 21.8% of residents were 65 years of age or older. For every 100 females there were 84.7 males, and for every 100 females age 18 and over there were 84.3 males age 18 and over.

Of the 1,563 households in Harrogate, 21.1% had children under the age of 18 living in them, 46.7% were married-couple households, 17.4% were households with a male householder and no spouse or partner present, and 29.9% were households with a female householder and no spouse or partner present. About 31.1% of all households were made up of individuals and 14.8% had someone living alone who was 65 years of age or older.

There were 1,762 housing units, of which 11.3% were vacant. The homeowner vacancy rate was 2.5% and the rental vacancy rate was 17.1%.

77.3% of residents lived in urban areas, while 22.7% lived in rural areas.

Racial composition as of the 2020 census
Race	Number	Percent
White	3,998	90.9%
Black or African American	102	2.3%
American Indian and Alaska Native	13	0.3%
Asian	41	0.9%
Native Hawaiian and Other Pacific Islander	2	0.0%
Some other race	91	2.1%
Two or more races	153	3.5%
Hispanic or Latino (of any race)	114	2.6%

=== 2000 census ===
As of the census of 2000, there were 2,865 people, 1,032 households, and 747 families residing in the Harrogate-Shawanee CDP. The population density was 688.3 inhabitants per square mile (265.8/km^{2}). There were 1,091 housing units at an average density of 262.1 per square mile (101.2/km^{2}). The racial makeup of the CDP was 94.73% White, 0.94% African American, 0.42% Native American, 0.94% Asian, 0.17% from other races, and 2.79% from two or more races. Hispanics or Latinos of any race were 0.52% of the population.

There were 1,032 households, out of which 27.5% had children under the age of 18 living with them, 56.4% were married couples living together, 12.8% had a female householder with no husband present, and 27.6% were non-families. 23.2% of all households were made up of individuals, and 9.9% had someone living alone who was 65 years of age or older. The average household size was 2.40 and the average family size was 2.83.

The age distribution was 20.5% under 18, 14.7% from 18 to 24, 24.2% from 25 to 44, 25.1% from 45 to 64, and 15.6% who were 65 or older. The median age was 38 years. For every 100 females, there were 84.7 males. For every 100 females age 18 and over, there were 83.2 males.

The median income for a household in the CDP was $34,227, and the median income for a family was $44,492. Males had a median income of $36,000 versus $25,036 for females. The per capita income for the CDP was $15,585. About 7.2% of families and 20.2% of the population were below the poverty line, including 17.0% of those under age 18 and 5.5% of those age 65 or over.

=== City ===
When Harrogate first incorporated the city population was approximately 2,700, but since that time the population has increased as a result of annexations. Harrogate became the largest city in Claiborne County.

== Education and culture ==
Lincoln Memorial University, a private four-year co-educational liberal arts college founded in 1897, is located in Harrogate. Its Abraham Lincoln Library and Museum houses a large collection of memorabilia relating to the school's namesake, Abraham Lincoln and the Civil War. Lincoln Memorial is the parent institution of the Debusk College of Osteopathic Medicine, the first osteopathic medical school in Tennessee.

Public schools in Harrogate are Ellen Myers Elementary, H.Y. Livesay Middle School, and Forge Ridge Consolidated School.

Cumberland Gap High School is located in Harrogate but has a Cumberland Gap address. This is also where Tri-State Christian Academy is located.

The town's Daniel Boone Arboretum contains over 50 labeled species of native trees.

== Town twinning ==
- Harrogate, United Kingdom
