= The House of the Rising Sun =

American traditional folk song popularized in 1964

"The House of the Rising Sun" is an American traditional folk song, sometimes called "Rising Sun Blues". It tells of a person's life gone wrong in the city of New Orleans. Many versions also urge a sibling or parents and children to avoid the same fate. The most successful commercial version, recorded in 1964 by the English rock band The Animals, was a number one hit on the UK Singles Chart and in the US and Canada. As a traditional folk song recorded by an electric rock band, it has been described as the "first folk rock hit".

The song was first collected in Appalachia in the 1930s, but probably has its roots in traditional English folk song. It is listed as number 6393 in the Roud Folk Song Index. In June 2026, CBS News included the song in its list of the 250 essential American songs of the past 250 years.

== Origin and early versions ==
=== Origin ===
Like many folk songs, "The House of the Rising Sun" is of uncertain authorship. Musicologists say that it is based on the tradition of broadside ballads, and thematically it has some resemblance to the 16th-century ballad "The Unfortunate Rake" (also cited as source material for "St. James Infirmary Blues"), yet there is no evidence suggesting that there is any direct relation. The folk song collector Alan Lomax suggested that the melody might be related to a 17th-century folk song, "Lord Barnard and Little Musgrave", also known as "Matty Groves", but a survey by Bertrand Bronson showed no clear relationship between the two songs.

==== Traditional English ====
Lomax also noted that "Rising Sun" was the name of a bawdy house in two traditional English songs, and a name for English pubs, and proposed that the location of the house was then relocated from England to the US by Southern performers. In 1953, Lomax met Harry Cox, an English farm labourer known for his impressive folk song repertoire, who knew a song called "She was a Rum One" (Roud 2128) with two possible opening verses, one beginning

If you go to Lowestoft, and ask for The Rising Sun,
There you'll find two old whores and my old woman is one.

The recording Lomax made of Harry Cox is available online. (Cox provides the alternative opening verse with the "Rising Sun" line at 1:40 in the recording.) It is considered extremely unlikely that Cox was aware of the American song. It is also lent credence by the fact that there was a pub in Lowestoft called The Rising Sun and by the fact that the town is the most easterly settlement in the UK (hence "rising sun"). Doubt has been expressed as to whether Cox's song has any connection to later versions.

==== France ====
Folklorist Vance Randolph proposed an alternative origin related to France, in which the "rising sun" might refer to the sunburst insignia dating to the time of Louis XIV, which was brought to North America by French immigrants.

=== Earliest American versions ===
"House of the Rising Sun" was said to have been known by American miners in 1905. The oldest published version of the lyrics is that printed by Robert Winslow Gordon in 1925, in a column titled "Old Songs That Men Have Sung" in Adventure magazine. The lyrics of that version begin:

There is a house in New Orleans, it's called the Rising Sun
It's been the ruin of many poor girl
Great God, and I for one.

The oldest known recording of the song, under the title "Rising Sun Blues", is by Appalachian artists Clarence "Tom" Ashley and Gwen Foster, who recorded it on September 6, 1933, on the Vocalion label (02576). Ashley said he had learned it from his grandfather, Enoch Ashley, who got married around the time of the Civil War, which suggests that the song could have been written years before the start of the 20th century. Roy Acuff, an "early-day friend and apprentice" of Clarence Ashley's, learned it from him and recorded it as "Rising Sun" on November 3, 1938.

The narrative of the lyrics has varied between male and female narrators. The earliest known printed version from Gordon's column is about a woman's warning. The earliest known recording of the song by Ashley is about a rounder, a male character. The lyrics of that version begin:

There is a house in New Orleans
They call the Rising Sun
Where many poor boys to destruction has gone
And me, oh God, are one.

On an expedition with his wife to eastern Kentucky, the folklorist Alan Lomax set up his recording equipment in Middlesboro, in the house of the singer and activist Tillman Cadle (husband of Mary Elizabeth Barnicle). There, he recorded a performance by Georgia Turner, the 16-year-old daughter of a local miner. He called it "The Rising Sun Blues". Lomax recorded two other different versions in Eastern Kentucky in 1937, both of which can be heard online: one sung by Dawson Henson and another by Bert Martin. In his 1941 songbook Our Singing Country, Lomax credits the song to Georgia Turner, using Martin's extra lyrics to "complete" the song. The Kentucky folk singer Jean Ritchie sang a different traditional version of the song to Lomax in 1949, which can be heard online courtesy of the Alan Lomax archive. Dillard Chandler of Madison County, North Carolina, sang a variant of the song beginning "There was a sport in New Orleans".

Several older blues recordings of songs with similar titles are unrelated, for example, "Rising Sun Blues" by Ivy Smith (1927), but Bluesologist for Texas music Coy Prather has argued that "The Risin' Sun" by Texas Alexander (1928) is an early blues version of the hillbilly song.

Ted Anthony in his research on the song noted a lyrical similarity to versions of an old tune called The Rambling Cowboy.

=== Early commercial folk and blues releases ===
In 1941, Woody Guthrie recorded a version. Keynote Records released one by Josh White in 1942, and Decca Records released one also in 1942 with guitar by White and the vocals performed by Libby Holman. Lead Belly recorded two versions of the song, in February 1944 and in October 1948, called "In New Orleans" and "The House of the Rising Sun", respectively; the latter was recorded in sessions that were later used on the album Lead Belly's Last Sessions (1953, Smithsonian Folkways). White and Lead Belly both seem to have learned the song from Alan Lomax.

In 1957, Glenn Yarbrough recorded the song for Elektra Records. The song is also credited to Ronnie Gilbert on an album by the Weavers released in the late 1940s or early 1950s. Pete Seeger released a version on Folkways Records in 1958, which was re-released by Smithsonian Folkways in 2009. Andy Griffith recorded the song on his 1959 album Andy Griffith Shouts the Blues and Old Timey Songs. The same year, a version by Judy Collins is released on the compilation Folk Song Festival at Exodus. In 1960, Miriam Makeba recorded the song on her eponymous RCA album.

Joan Baez recorded it in 1960 on her eponymous debut album; she frequently performed the song in concert throughout her career. Nina Simone recorded her first version for the live album Nina at the Village Gate in 1962. Simone later covered the song again on her 1967 studio album Nina Simone Sings the Blues. Tim Hardin sang it on This is Tim Hardin, recorded in 1964 but not released until 1967. The Chambers Brothers recorded a version on Feelin' the Blues, released on Vault Records (1970).

=== Van Ronk arrangement ===
In late 1961, Bob Dylan recorded the song for his debut album, released in March 1962. That release had no songwriting credit, but the liner notes indicate that Dylan learned this version of the song from Dave Van Ronk. In an interview for the documentary No Direction Home, Van Ronk said that he was intending to record the song and that Dylan copied his version. Van Ronk recorded it soon thereafter for the album Just Dave Van Ronk.

I had learned it sometime in the 1950s, from a recording by Hally Wood, the Texas singer and collector, who had got it from an Alan Lomax field recording by a Kentucky woman named Georgia Turner. I put a different spin on it by altering the chords and using a bass line that descended in half steps—a common enough progression in jazz, but unusual among folksingers. By the early 1960s, the song had become one of my signature pieces, and I could hardly get off the stage without doing it. Then, one evening in 1962, I was sitting at my usual table in the back of the Kettle of Fish, and Dylan came slouching in. He had been up at the Columbia studios with John Hammond, doing his first album. He was being very mysterioso about the whole thing, and nobody I knew had been to any of the sessions except Suze, his lady. I pumped him for information, but he was vague. Everything was going fine and, "Hey, would it be okay for me to record your arrangement of 'House of the Rising Sun?'" Oh, shit. "Jeez, Bobby, I'm going into the studio to do that myself in a few weeks. Can't it wait until your next album?" A long pause. "Uh-oh". I did not like the sound of that. "What exactly do you mean, 'Uh-oh'?" "Well", he said sheepishly, "I've already recorded it".

== The Animals' version ==
"The House of the Rising Sun"
- US picture sleeve

Single by the Animals

from the album The Animals
- B-side: "Talkin' 'bout You"
- Released: June 19, 1964
- Recorded: May 18, 1964
- Genre: Folk rock; blues rock; soft rock; British R&B
- Length: 4:29 (album version); 2:59 (radio edit)
- Label: Columbia
- Songwriters: Traditional, arr. by Alan Price
- Producer: Mickie Most

The Animals singles chronology
"Baby Let Me Take You Home" (1964)	"The House of the Rising Sun" (1964)	"I'm Crying" (1964)

An interview with Eric Burdon revealed that he first heard the song in a club in Newcastle, England, where it was sung by the Northumbrian folk singer Johnny Handle. The Animals were on tour with Chuck Berry and chose it because they wanted something distinctive to sing.

The Animals had begun featuring their arrangement of "The House of the Rising Sun" during a joint concert tour with Chuck Berry, using it as their closing number to differentiate themselves from acts that always closed with straight rockers. It elicited a tremendous reaction from the audience, convincing initially reluctant producer Mickie Most that it had hit potential, and between tour stops the group went to a small recording studio, De Lane Lea Studios on Kingsway in London to capture it. The song was first performed in a concert in Bellingham Town Hall, in Northumberland.

=== Recording and releases ===
The song was recorded in just one take on May 18, 1964, and it starts with a now-famous electric guitar A minor chord arpeggio by Hilton Valentine. According to Valentine, he simply took Dylan's chord sequence and played it as an arpeggio. The performance takes off with Burdon's lead vocal, which has been variously described as "howling", "soulful", and as "...deep and gravelly as the north-east English city of Newcastle that spawned him". Finally, Alan Price's pulsating organ part (played on a Vox Continental) completes the sound. Burdon later said, "We were looking for a song that would grab people's attention."

As recorded, "The House of the Rising Sun" ran four and a half minutes, regarded as far too long for a pop single at the time. Producer Most, who initially did not really want to record the song at all, said that on this occasion: "Everything was in the right place ... It only took 15 minutes to make so I can't take much credit for the production." He was nonetheless now a believer and declared it a single at its full length, saying "We're in a microgroove world now, we will release it."

In the US, the original single (MGM 13264) was a 2:58 version. The MGM Golden Circle reissue (KGC 179) featured the unedited 4:29 version, although the record label gives the edited playing time of 2:58. The edited version was included on the group's 1964 US debut album The Animals, while the full version was later included on their best-selling 1966 US greatest hits album, The Best of the Animals. The first American album release of the full version was on a 1965 compilation entitled Mickie Most Presents British Go-Go (MGM SE-4306), the cover of which, under the listing of "House of the Rising Sun", described it as the "Original uncut version". Americans could also hear the complete version in the movie Go Go Mania in the spring of 1965.

Cash Box described the US single version as "a haunting, beat-ballad updating of the famed folk-blues opus that the group's lead delivers in telling solo vocal fashion."

"The House of the Rising Sun" was not included on any of the group's British albums, but it was reissued as a single twice in subsequent decades, charting both times, reaching number 25 in 1972 and number 11 in 1982.

The Animals version was played in 6/8 meter, unlike the 4/4 of most earlier versions. Arranging credit went only to Alan Price. According to Burdon, this was simply because there was insufficient room to name all five band members on the record label, and Alan Price's first name was first alphabetically. This meant that only Price received songwriter's royalties for the hit, which has caused bitterness among the other band members ever since. The song is in the public domain and Dave Van Ronk, who intended to sue them, realised that an arrangement cannot be protected by copyright.

=== Personnel ===
- Eric Burdon – vocals
- Hilton Valentine – Gretsch electric guitar
- Chas Chandler – Epiphone Rivoli bass guitar
- Alan Price – Vox Continental organ
- John Steel – Premier drums

=== Reception ===
"House of the Rising Sun" was a trans-Atlantic hit: after reaching the top of the UK pop singles chart in July 1964, it topped the US pop singles chart two months later, on September 5, 1964, where it stayed for three weeks. Many cite this as the first true classic rock song, and it became the first British Invasion number one unconnected with the Beatles. It was the group's breakthrough hit in both countries and became their signature song. The song was also a hit in Ireland twice, peaking at No. 10 upon its initial release in 1964 and later reaching a brand new peak of No. 5 when reissued in 1982.

According to John Steel, Bob Dylan told him that when he first heard the Animals' version on his car radio, he stopped to listen, "jumped out of his car" and "banged on the bonnet" (the hood of the car), inspiring him to go electric. Dave Van Ronk said that the Animals' version—like Dylan's version before it—was based on his arrangement of the song.

Dave Marsh described the Animals' take on "The House of the Rising Sun" as "the first folk-rock hit", sounding "as if they'd connected the ancient tune to a live wire". Writer Ralph McLean of the BBC agreed that it was "arguably the first folk rock tune" and "a revolutionary single", after which "the face of modern music was changed forever."

The Animals' rendition of the song is recognized as one of the classics of British pop music. Writer Lester Bangs labeled it "a brilliant rearrangement" and "a new standard rendition of an old standard composition". In 2021 (and 2024) it ranked number 471 on Rolling Stone magazine's list of "500 Greatest Songs of All Time". It is also one of the Rock and Roll Hall of Fame's "500 Songs That Shaped Rock and Roll". The Recording Industry Association of America (RIAA) ranked it number 240 on their list of "Songs of the Century". In 1999, it received a Grammy Hall of Fame Award. It has long since become a staple of oldies and classic rock radio. A 2005 Channel 5 poll ranked it as Britain's fourth-favorite number one song.

=== Charts ===
==== Weekly charts ====
Chart (1964–1965)	Peak position
Australia (Kent Music Report)	2
Belgium (Ultratop 50 Flanders)	5
Belgium (Ultratop 50 Wallonia)	4
Canada Top Singles (RPM)	1
Denmark	8
Finland (Suomen virallinen lista)	1
France (SNEP)	10
Ireland (IRMA)	10
Italy (Musica e dischi)	12
Japan (Tokushin Musik Report)	5
Netherlands (Single Top 100)	5
New Zealand (Lever Hit Parade)	2
Spain (Promusicae)	1
Sweden (Kvällstoppen)	4
Sweden (Tio i Topp)	8
UK Singles (Official Charts)	1
US Billboard Hot 100	1
US Cash Box Top 100	1
US Record World 100 Top Pops	1
West Germany (GfK)	9

Chart (1972)	Peak position
UK Singles (Official Charts)	25

Chart (1982)	Peak position
Ireland (IRMA)	5
UK Singles (Official Charts)	11

==== Year-end charts ====
Chart (1964)	Rank
UK Singles (OCC)	16
US Billboard	38
US Cash Box Top 100	53

=== Certifications ===
Region	Certification	Certified units/sales
Denmark (IFPI Danmark)	Platinum	90,000^{‡}
Italy (FIMI) sales since 2009	Platinum	50,000^{‡}
New Zealand (RMNZ)	4× Platinum	120,000^{‡}
Spain (Promusicae)	Platinum	100,000^{‡}
United Kingdom (BPI) sales since 2004	2× Platinum	1,200,000^{‡}
^{‡} Sales+streaming figures based on certification alone.

== Frijid Pink version ==
"House of the Rising Sun"
- Artwork for Danish, French and German releases (French pressing pictured)

Single by Frijid Pink

from the album Frijid Pink
- B-side: "Drivin' Blues"
- Released: December 1969
- Genre: Psychedelic rock; acid rock; blues rock
- Length: 4:44 (album); 3:23 (single)
- Label: Parrot
- Songwriters: Traditional; arr. by Alan Price
- Producer: Michael Valvano

Frijid Pink singles chronology
"House of the Rising Sun" (1969)	"Sing a Song for Freedom" (1970)

In 1969, the Detroit band Frijid Pink recorded a psychedelic version of "House of the Rising Sun", which became an international hit in 1970. Their version is in 4/4 (like Van Ronk's and most earlier versions, rather than the 6/8 used by the Animals) and was driven by Gary Ray Thompson's distorted guitar with fuzz and wah-wah effects, set against the frenetic drumming of Richard Stevers.

According to Stevers, the Frijid Pink recording of "House of the Rising Sun" was done impromptu when there was time left over at a recording session booked for the group at the Tera Shirma Recording Studios. Stevers later played snippets from that session's tracks for Paul Cannon, the music director of Detroit's premier rock radio station, WKNR; the two knew each other, as Cannon was the father of Stevers's girlfriend. Stevers recalled, "we went through the whole thing and [Cannon] didn't say much. Then 'House [of the Rising Sun]' started up and I immediately turned it off because it wasn't anything I really wanted him to hear." However, Cannon was intrigued and had Stevers play the complete track for him, then advising Stevers, "Tell Parrot [Frijid Pink's label] to drop "God Gave Me You" [the group's current single] and go with this one."

Frijid Pink's "House of the Rising Sun" debuted at number 29 on the WKNR hit parade dated January 6, 1970, and broke nationally after some seven weeks—during which the track was re-serviced to radio three times—with a number 73 debut on the Hot 100 in Billboard dated February 27, 1970 (number 97 Canada 1970/01/31), with a subsequent three-week ascent to the top 30 en route to a Hot 100 peak of number seven on April 4, 1970. The certification of the Frijid Pink single "House of the Rising Sun" as a gold record for domestic sales of one million units was reported in the issue of Billboard dated May 30, 1970.

The Frijid Pink single of "House of the Rising Sun" would give the song its most widespread international success, with top 10 status reached in Austria (number three), Belgium (Flemish region, number six), Canada (number three), Denmark (number three), Germany (two weeks at number one), Greece, Ireland (number seven), Israel (number four), the Netherlands (number three), Norway (seven weeks at number one), Poland (number two), Sweden (number six), Switzerland (number two), and the UK (number four). The single also charted in Australia (number 14), France (number 36), and Italy (number 54).

=== Charts ===
==== Weekly charts ====
Chart (1970)	Peak position
Australia (Kent Music Report)	15
Austria (Ö3 Austria Top 40)	3
Belgium (Ultratop 50 Flanders)	6
Belgium (Ultratop 50 Wallonia)	5
Canada Top Singles (RPM)	3
Denmark (IFPI)	3
Finland (Suomen virallinen lista)	15
Ireland (IRMA)	7
Netherlands (Dutch Top 40)	4
Netherlands (Single Top 100)	3
New Zealand (Listener)	17
Norway (VG-lista)	1
Switzerland (Schweizer Hitparade)	2
UK Singles (Official Charts)	4
US Billboard Hot 100	7
US Cash Box Top 100	6
West Germany (GfK)	1

==== Year-end charts ====
Chart (1970)	Position
Canada Top Singles (RPM)	56
West Germany (Official German Charts)	10

=== Sales and certifications ===
Region	Certification	Certified units/sales
United States (RIAA)	Gold	1,000,000^{^}
^{^} Shipments figures based on certification alone.

== Dolly Parton version ==
"The House of the Rising Sun"

Single by Dolly Parton

from the album 9 to 5 and Odd Jobs
- A-side: "Working Girl"
- Released: August 3, 1981
- Recorded: November 1980
- Genre: Country pop
- Length: 4:02
- Label: RCA
- Songwriter: Traditional
- Producer: Mike Post

Dolly Parton singles chronology
"But You Know I Love You" (1981)	"The House of the Rising Sun" (1981)	"Single Women" (1982)

In August 1980, Dolly Parton released a recording of the song as the third single from her album 9 to 5 and Odd Jobs. Like Miller's earlier country hit, Parton's remake returns the song to its original lyric of being about a fallen woman. The Parton version makes it quite blunt, with a few new lyric lines that were written by Parton. Parton's remake reached number 14 on the US country singles chart and crossed over to the pop charts, where it reached number 77 on the Billboard Hot 100; it also reached number 30 on the US Adult Contemporary chart. Parton had occasionally performed the song live, including on her 1987–88 television show, in an episode taped in New Orleans. In Canada it reached number 20.

== Five Finger Death Punch version ==
"The House of the Rising Sun"

Single by Five Finger Death Punch

from the album The Wrong Side of Heaven and the Righteous Side of Hell, Volume 2
- Released: February 3, 2014
- Recorded: 2012–2013
- Studio: The Hideout Studios, Las Vegas, Nevada
- Genre: Heavy metal; alternative metal
- Length: 4:07
- Label: Prospect Park
- Songwriters: Traditional, Alan Price
- Producer: Kevin Churko

Five Finger Death Punch singles chronology
"Battle Born" (2013)	"The House of the Rising Sun" (2014)	"Mama Said Knock You Out" (2014)

Music video
- "The House of the Rising Sun" on YouTube

In 2014, Five Finger Death Punch released a version for their album The Wrong Side of Heaven and the Righteous Side of Hell, Volume 2. Five Finger Death Punch's remake reached number 7 on the US Billboard Mainstream Rock chart. The setting is also changed in FFDP's version from New Orleans to Sin City, as a nod to the band's hometown, and is also well known for being a haven for gambling places like New Orleans (see also: Gambling in the United States). The FFDP version is a cover of The Animals cover.

=== Certifications ===
Region	Certification	Certified units/sales
Denmark (IFPI Danmark)	Gold	45,000^{‡}
New Zealand (RMNZ)	Gold	15,000^{‡}
^{‡} Sales+streaming figures based on certification alone.

== Other charting versions ==
The song has been widely (more than 300 times) covered and remixed over the ages. Charting versions include:

- In 1969, Claude King's version reached number 28 on Canada's country charts, December 20, 1969.
- In 1973, Jody Miller's version reached number 29 on the country charts and number 41 on the Adult Contemporary chart. In Canada it reached number 23 on the country charts and number 81 on the AC charts.
- In 1977, Santa Esmeralda scored a top 20 disco hit with a dance version of the song and number 78 on the Billboard Hot 100.
- In 1996, Gary Glitter released a cover version of "House of the Rising Sun" as a single, which reached number 77 on the UK Singles Chart.

=== Foreign language versions ===
==== Johnny Hallyday version (in French) ====
"Le Pénitencier"

Single by Johnny Hallyday

from the album Le Pénitencier
- Language: French
- English title: The Penitentiary
- Released: October 14, 1964
- Recorded: September 1964
- Label: Philips
- Songwriters: Hugues Aufray; Vline Buggy; Alan Price
- Producer: Lee Hallyday

Johnny Hallyday singles chronology
"Les Mauvais garçons" (1964)	"Le Pénitencier" (1964)	"Un ami ça n'a pas de prix" (1965)

Music video
- "Le Pénitencier" (Live on French TV, 1966) "Le Pénitencier" (Live at the Théâtre de Paris, 2013) on YouTube

The song was covered in French by Johnny Hallyday. His version (titled "Le Pénitencier", pronounced [lə penitɑ̃sje], meaning "The penitentiary") was released in October 1964 and spent one week at number one on the singles sales chart in France (from October 17 to 23). In Wallonia, Belgium, his single spent 28 weeks on the chart, also peaking at number one.

He performed the song during his 2014 US tour.

===== Charts =====
Charts
Chart (1964–1965)	Peak position
Belgium (Ultratop 50 Wallonia)	1
France (IFOP)	1
Spain (Promusicae)	14

==== Los Speakers version (in Spanish) ====
Colombian band Los Speakers covered the song under the title "La Casa del Sol Naciente", in their 1965 album of the same name.

==== Agnaldo Timóteo version (in Portuguese) ====
The song is from Agnaldo Timóteo's debut album, Surge Um Astro, released in 1965. The song was recorded and released in 1965, the year of Agnaldo Timóteo's rise to fame. The lyrics were adapted by Fred Jorge, who transformed the American blues into a ballad with a tone of melancholy and hope that deeply connected with the Brazilian audience.

==== EAV version and 'Wilbert Eckart und seine Volksmusik Stars' versions (in German) ====
Two notable German covers/adaptions were created, one by Erste Allgemeine Verunsicherung, which in 1989 recorded a song with lyrics telling the story of an East Germany citizen fleeing East Berlin after the Fall of the Berlin Wall and his following disillusion with Western society. Another one that gained international recognition was created for the soundtrack of Wolfenstein: The New Order in 2014, interpreting the song with Volksmusik instrumentation, fitting the alternate future theme of the game in which Nazi Germany won World War II, as part of a collection of 'adapted' pop hits.

==== Miki Jevremović and Iskre versions (in Serbo-Croatian) ====
Famous Yugoslav pop singer Miodrag "Miki" Jevremović covered the song under the title "Kuća izlazećeg sunca" and included it in his 1964 EP 18 Žutih Ruža (Eighteen Yellow Roses). A version recorded by Yugoslav rock band Iskre appeared on their 1965 EP Tequila.

==== Kult version (in Polish) ====
Polish rock band Kult released a Polish-language version of the song under the title "Dom wschodzącego słońca" in the 1993 reedition of their self-titled debut album from 1987.

==== Japanese version ====
The Japanese version refers to a brothel, and the danger is to women who enter.

== Possible real locations ==
Various places in New Orleans have been proposed as the inspiration for the song, with varying plausibility. The phrase "House of the Rising Sun" is often understood as a euphemism for a brothel, but it is uncertain as to whether the house described in the lyrics was an actual or a fictitious place. One theory is that the song is about a woman who killed her father, an alcoholic gambler who had beaten his wife. Therefore, the House of the Rising Sun may be a jailhouse, from which one would be the first person to see the sunrise (an idea supported by the lyric mentioning "a ball and chain", though that phrase has been slang for marital relationships for at least as long as the song has been in print). Because women often sang the song, another theory is that the House of the Rising Sun was where prostitutes were detained while being treated for syphilis. Since cures with mercury were ineffective, going back was very unlikely.

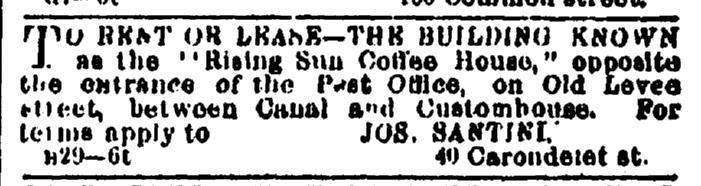
1867 advertisement noting the "Rising Sun Coffee House" building for rent or lease

Only three candidates that use the name Rising Sun have historical evidence—from old city directories and newspapers. The first was a small, short-lived hotel on Conti Street in the French Quarter in the 1820s. It burned down in 1822. An excavation and document search in early 2005 found evidence that supported this claim, including an advertisement with language that may have euphemistically indicated prostitution. Archaeologists found an unusually large number of pots of rouge and cosmetics at the site.

The second possibility was a "Rising Sun Hall" listed in late 19th-century city directories on what is now Cherokee Street, at the riverfront in the uptown Carrollton neighborhood, which seems to have been a building owned and used for meetings of a Social Aid and Pleasure Club, commonly rented out for dances and functions. It also is no longer extant. Definite links to gambling or prostitution (if any) are undocumented for either of these buildings.

A third was "The Rising Sun", which advertised in several local newspapers in the 1860s, located on what is now the lake side of the 100 block of Decatur Street. In various advertisements it is described as a "Restaurant", a "Lager Beer Salon", and a "Coffee House". At the time, New Orleans businesses listed as coffee houses often also sold alcoholic beverages.

Dave Van Ronk wrote in his biography The Mayor of MacDougal Street that at one time when he was in New Orleans someone approached him with a number of old photos of the city from the turn of the century. Among them "was a picture of a foreboding stone doorway with a carving on the lintel of a stylized rising sun ... It was the Orleans Parish women's prison".

Bizarre New Orleans, a guidebook on New Orleans, asserts that the real house was at 1614 Esplanade Avenue between 1862 and 1874 and was said to have been named after its madam, Marianne LeSoleil Levant, whose surname means "the rising sun" in French.

Another guidebook, Offbeat New Orleans, asserts that the real House of the Rising Sun was at 826–830 St. Louis St. between 1862 and 1874, also purportedly named for Marianne LeSoleil Levant. The building still stands, and Eric Burdon, after visiting at the behest of the owner, said, "The house was talking to me".

There is a contemporary B&B called the House of the Rising Sun, decorated in brothel style. The owners are fans of the song, but there is no connection with the original place.

Not everyone is convinced that the house actually ever existed. Pamela D. Arceneaux, a research librarian at the Williams Research Center in New Orleans, is quoted as saying:

I have made a study of the history of prostitution in New Orleans and have often confronted the perennial question, "Where is the House of the Rising Sun?" without finding a satisfactory answer. Although it is generally assumed that the singer is referring to a brothel, there is actually nothing in the lyrics that indicate that the "house" is a brothel. Many knowledgeable persons have conjectured that a better case can be made for either a gambling hall or a prison; however, to paraphrase Freud: sometimes lyrics are just lyrics.
