= Rocky Face =

Rocky Face may refer to:

- Battle of Rocky Face Ridge fought May 7–13, 1864, in Whitfield County, Georgia during the Atlanta Campaign of the American Civil War.
- Rocky Face Fault, a geological feature
- Rocky Face, Georgia, an unincorporated area in the U.S. State of Georgia
