= Middlesboro crater =

Impact crater in Kentucky

- Middlesborough astrobleme
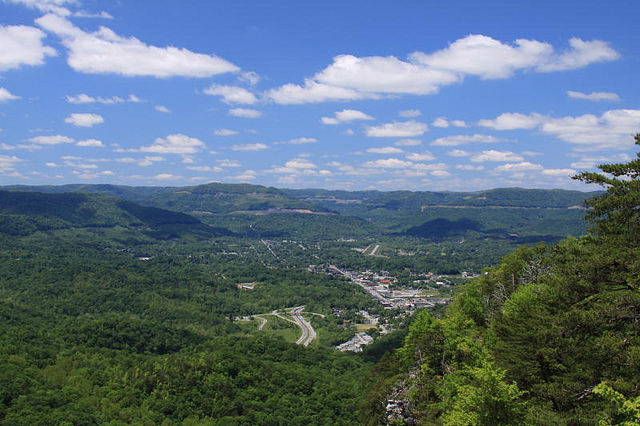
- The city of Middlesboro is built within the crater

- Location within Kentucky
- Location: Bell County, Kentucky, United States, Kentucky, United States; 36°37′N 83°44′W

Impact crater structure
- Confidence: Confirmed
- Diameter: 6 kilometers (3.7 mi)
- Age: <300 Ma; Permian to late Mesozoic
- Exposed: Yes
- Drilled: Yes
- Access: U.S. Route 25E

The Middlesboro crater (or astrobleme) is a meteorite crater in Kentucky, United States. It is named after the city of Middlesboro, Kentucky, which today occupies much of the crater.

The crater is approximately 3 miles (about 5 km) wide and its age is estimated to be less than 300 million years (Permian). The impactor is estimated to have been about 100 m in diameter.

== History ==
The Middlesboro crater is located in the Appalachian Mountains, between the Cumberland Mountains and Pine Mountain. It forms part of the string of geological features that made the Cumberland Gap, a critical westward passage during the settlement of Kentucky and the Ohio Valley in the late 18th and early 19th centuries.

== Settlements ==
The town of Middlesboro, built in the crater, was established in 1886 to exploit iron and coal deposits, although the town's founder, Alexander A. Arthur, apparently did not know of the crater's extraterrestrial origin. K. J. Englund and J. B. Roen, working for the U. S. Geological Survey, identified the impact basin in 1962.

== Geological features ==
The 12-mile (19 km) long Cumberland Gap consists of four geologic features: the Yellow Creek valley, the natural gap in the Cumberland Mountain ridge, the eroded gap in Pine Mountain, and Middlesboro crater.

Middlesboro crater is a 3-mile (4.8 km) diameter meteorite impact crater in which Middlesboro, Kentucky, is located. The crater was identified in 1966 when Robert Dietz discovered shatter cones in sandstone, which led to the further identification of shocked quartz. Shatter cones, a rock shattering pattern naturally formed only during impact events, are found in abundance in the area. In September 2003 the site was designated a Distinguished Geologic Site by the Kentucky Society of Professional Geologists.

Without the Middlesboro crater, it would have been difficult for packhorses to navigate this gap, formed by differential erosion along one of the subsequent cross faults, and improbable that wagon roads would have been constructed at an early date. Middlesboro is the only place in the world where coal is mined inside an impact crater. Special mining techniques must be used in the complicated strata of this crater. (Milam & Kuehn, 36).

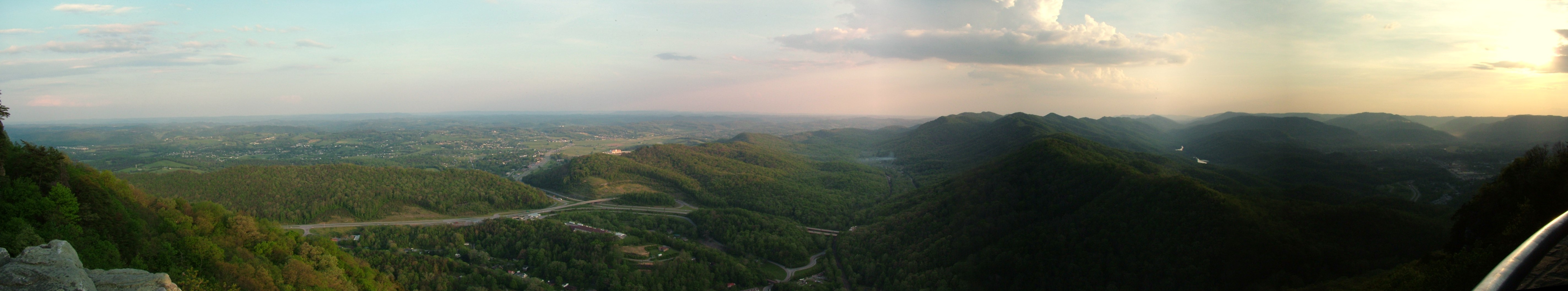
Panoramic view from Pinnacle Overlook at Cumberland Gap National Historic Park

== Industrial activity ==
While coal mining is still the town's primary economic driver, local leaders hope to turn the crater into a tourist destination. In 2003, the Kentucky Society of Professional Geologists designated the area a Distinguished Geologic Site, and the construction of the Cumberland Gap Tunnel makes the town a convenient source of supplies for visitors to Cumberland Gap National Historical Park.
