= Rocky Face Fault =

Coordinates: 36°41′38″N 83°41′04″W

The Rocky Face Fault is a geological fault responsible, in part, for the location of Cumberland Gap at Cumberland Mountain and the Narrows gap at Pine Mountain in the southern Appalachian Mountains. The fact that these two gaps lined up enabled western migration across the Appalachians to Kentucky. Included along the fault are the towns of Middlesboro and Pineville, Kentucky. The fault represents a crack in the Cumberland Overthrust Sheet, one of many remnant resistant strata pushed upwards to the northwest over the neighboring Cumberland Plateau. The fault is named after Rocky Face, a prominent, cliff-lined mountain between Middlesboro and Pineville, Kentucky.
