= Un ami ça n'a pas de prix =

1965 single by Johnny Hallyday

Single by Johnny Hallyday
- Language: French
- English title: A friend is priceless
- A-side: "Johnny lui dit adieu"
- Released: 20 January 1965
- Genre: Rock and roll
- Length: 2:26
- Label: Philips
- Songwriter(s): Ralph Bernet, Larry Gréco

Johnny Hallyday singles chronology
"Le Pénitencier" (1964)	"Un ami ça n'a pas de prix" (1965)	"Quand revient la nuit" (1965)

"Un ami ça n'a pas de prix" is a song by French singer Johnny Hallyday. It was released on an EP titled "Johnny lui dit adieu / Un ami ça n'a pas de prix" in January 1965.

== Composition and writing ==
The song was written by Ralph Bernet and Larry Gréco.

== Commercial performance ==
The song was released on an EP titled "Johnny lui dit adieu / Un ami ça n'a pas de prix" in 1965.

In France the EP charted as "Un ami ça n'a pas de prix" and spent one week at no. 1 on the singles sales chart (in January 1965).

In Wallonia (French Belgium) it charted as a double A-side "Johnny lui dit adieu / Un ami ça n'a pas de prix" and reached no. 6.

== Track listing ==
7" (45 RPM) EP Philips 437.007 BE (1974, France)

A1. "Johnny lui dit adieu" ("Tell Her Johnny Said Goodbye") (2:42)
A2. "On te montrera du doigt" ("You Finally Said Something Good") (2:27)
B1. "Un ami ça n'a pas de prix" (2:26)
B2. " Maudite rivière" (2:31)

== Charts ==
=== "Un ami ça n'a pas de prix" ===
Chart (1965)	Peak position
Belgium (Ultratop 50 Wallonia)	6
France (Singles Sales)	1

=== "Johnny lui dit adieu" ===
Chart (1965)	Peak position
Belgium (Ultratop 50 Flanders)	19
Belgium (Ultratop 50 Wallonia)	6
