= Henry Harrison Mayes =

American evangelist (1898–1986)

Henry Harrison Mayes (February 8, 1898 – March 7, 1986) was an American evangelist and coal miner from Middlesboro, Kentucky. He planted thousands of religious signs and concrete markers alongside American highways and near airports. The main message of the crosses and sometimes heart-shaped markers were "Prepare to Meet God" and "Jesus is Coming Soon", sometimes engraved with instructions for their final destinations on other continents or planets. His work has been considered a type of folk-religion and he referred to himself as "God's Advertiser".

Mayes was born on February 8, 1898, in Fork Ridge, Claiborne County, Tennessee.

Together with his wife, Lilly, Mayes started his self-funded, life-time mission, following his recovery from an accident in the coal mines in his early twenties.

In a filmed interview with artist Eleanor Dickinson, Mayes said that he built his home in the shape of a cross, with its rooms and windows representing the Apostles, the Ten Commandments, and the eight people saved aboard Noah's Ark.

While most of Mayes' early signs, made from wood, cardboard or oil cloth, have disappeared, his main body of work, including tools and other artifacts, is preserved in The People's Building at the Museum of Appalachia. Around 25 objects (including concrete markers and barn signs) can still be found alongside old highways or have been relocated to churches or on private property. He installed a 120-foot long, lighted cross on a steep hill visible from Cumberland Avenue, Middlesboro's main street. A corrugated metal sign reading "GET RIGHT WITH GOD" was included in the 2016 Southern Accent exhibition at the Nasher Museum of Art.

Mayes' story has been told in Foxfire magazine, in the self-published book A Coal Miner's Simple Message by his daughter-in-law Catherine Mayes and in numerous newspaper articles and magazines.
