= Colson House =

19th century historic homes in the United States

There are several historic homes in the United States which bear the name Colson House, spanning the century from c. 1800 to 1905.

== Rev. John C. Colson House, Middlesboro, Kentucky (1800) ==
The house of Rev. John Calvin Colson in Middlesboro, Kentucky, is thought to have been built around 1800 by a Mr. Hunter. It was the second brick house built in Bell County and is now the oldest remaining house in the county. The bricks were made from local clay. John Colson was a lawyer, doctor, farmer, miller, merchant and preacher. Rev. Colson's son, David G. Colson, was a U.S. Representative.

== Colson House, Brecksville, Ohio (1838) ==
The Colson House in Brecksville, Ohio, was built around 1838 by Bolter and Harriet (Waite) Colson. Bolter and Harriet arrived in Brecksville in 1815 from Weymouth, Massachusetts. The house was built in the Gothic Revival farmhouse style on Brecksville Road, a block from the town center. The Colsons were among the original founders of the First Congregational Church of Brecksville in 1816, Bolter being made a deacon in 1821. Bolter came from a family of Revolutionary War veterans, himself being a veteran of the War of 1812. Among their 11 children, son Newton was a Civil War veteran and eventually lived in the house with his wife Lydia until his death in 1917. Lydia Colson stayed in the house until 1932 when it was sold to the Carroll family. In the mid-1930s, the house served as the Brecksville Telephone Exchange. Around 1960, the house was saved from demolition by Walter Zimlich and moved two blocks away to Cedar Street in the Old Town neighborhood. Emil and Wilma Kocar bought the house in 1966. The Akel family bought the house in 2000 and initiated stabilization and remodeling. Since 2003, the VanderWiel family has lived in the house while undertaking restoration and remodeling work.

== Colson House, St. Charles, Illinois (1882) ==
The Colson House in St. Charles, Illinois, was constructed by John Fabian Colson in 1882. Prior to the completion of this Queen Anne Style home, Colson established Colson's Department Store on west Main Street. The home remained in the Colson family until the 1950s. At that time, the Skar family bought the home. In 1987, the Schultz family bought it and began renovations. For many years, the home served as a bed and breakfast inn called the Charleston Guest House. As of 2007, the American Black Forest Clocks business is located in the house.

== Colson House, Seattle, Washington (1904) ==
The Colson House in the Green Lake neighborhood of Seattle, Washington, was constructed in 1904 by Charles and Sophie Colson. Born in Sweden, Charles arrived 1878 and Sophie in 1882. The couple married in Illinois in 1887 and had three children; Frank, Mabel, and Violet. The family moved to Washington in 1902. In 1904, the Colsons hired carpenter Olof Wickander to build the house, and was also listed as the architecture of record. It is thought that the design may have been purchased from a catalog, a common practice at the time. The Seattle Department of Neighborhoods Historical Site summary described the house: "Front gable vernacular house with wall gable dormers on the east and west elevations. End gable has fishscale shingles. Porch has heavy tapered posts supporting a hip roof." Coordinates: 47°40′53″N 122°19′24″W

== Colson House, Gainesville, Florida (1905) ==
The Colson House in Gainesville, Florida, was constructed circa 1905. It is a Neoclassical Victorian which was occupied by the family of Dr. James Colson for more than 70 years. In 1977, the home was converted into law offices. The house was the home of the Star Center Youth Theatre. It is currently the home of Florida Smart Kids tutoring service. The attic features an unusual colored glass window with diamond shaped panes. The house is adjacent to the Sweetwater Branch Inn Bed & Breakfast, a complex composed of the Cushman-Colson house, a Victorian home built around 1885, and the McKenzie House, a circa 1895 three-story Queen Anne Victorian listed on the National Register of Historic Places Coordinates: 29°39′06″N 82°19′09″W
