= Georgia Turner =

American singer

- Born: Georgia Bell Turner; 1921; Middlesboro, Kentucky, U.S.
- Died: 1969 (aged 48)

Georgia Turner (born Georgia Bell Turner; 1921–1969) was an American folk singer. She is credited with an early recording of "Rising Sun Blues", produced by Alan Lomax in 1937, in Middlesboro, Kentucky. Her adaptation of this American folk classic, better known as "The House Of The Rising Sun," has become the standard, the ancestor of covers by hundreds of later performers, including Dave Van Ronk, Bob Dylan, The Animals, Joan Baez, Tracy Chapman, Muse, and Andy Griffith. (The lyrics later published by Lomax in Our Singing Country in 1941 incorporate some lines from a version performed by Bert Martin).

Turner married twice, eventually settled in Michigan, and gave birth to eleven children, nine of whom survived infancy. Lomax arranged for her to receive a share of songwriter's royalties for some recordings of the song, which her family remembers being quite helpful during economic hardship in the last decade of her life, before her death in 1969 from emphysema.

Turner's performance of the song was rereleased in 2003 by Rounder Records, on the Alan Lomax Popular Songbook CD.
