= Cumberland Gap =

Narrow pass through the Cumberland Mountains in the US

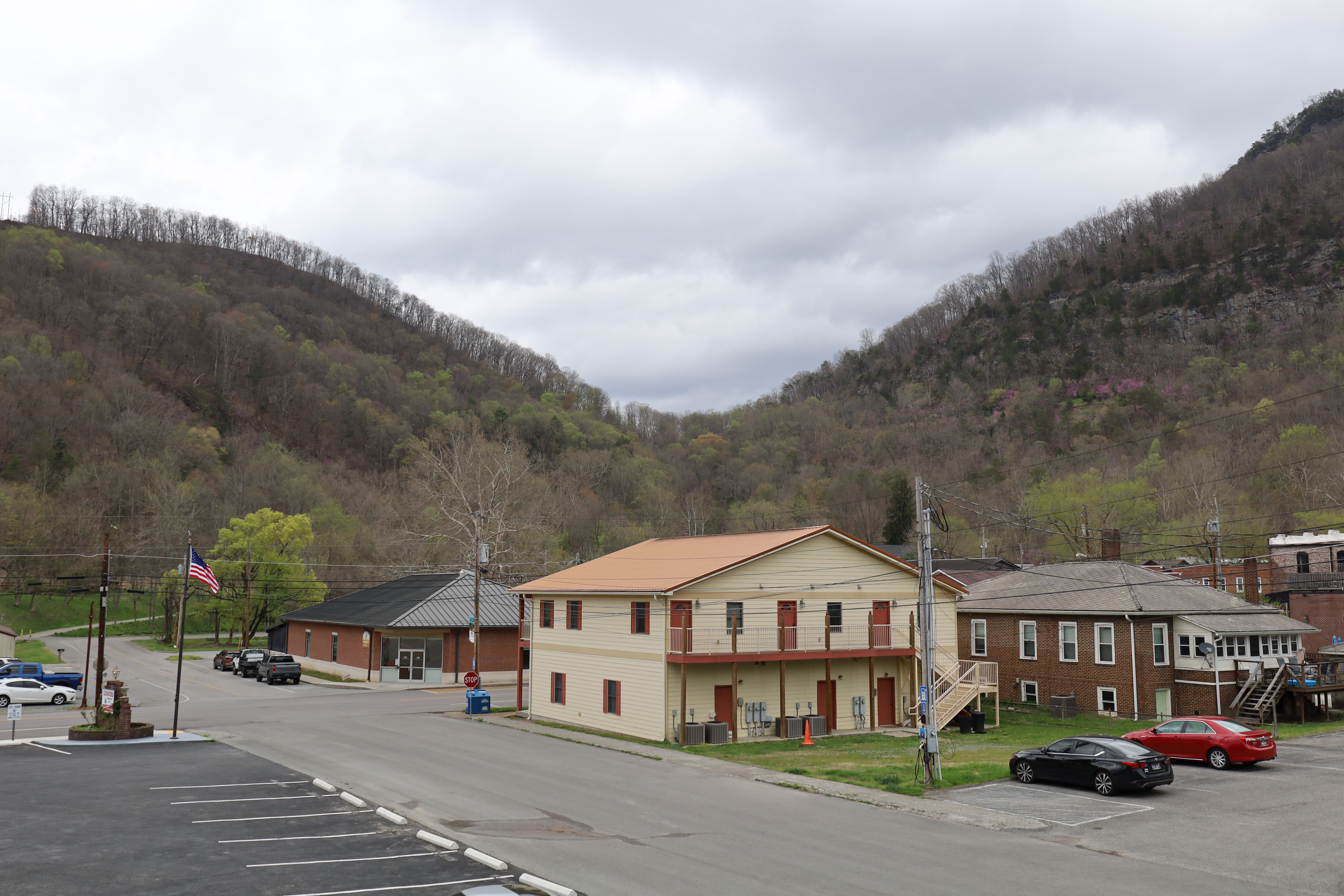
- The Cumberland Gap viewed from the town of Cumberland Gap, Tennessee, in 2025

- Location within the United States Location within Virginia Location within Kentucky
- Elevation: 1,631 ft (497 m)
- Traversed by: US 25E

Third Approach
- Location: Kentucky; Tennessee; Virginia; United States
- Range: Cumberland Mountains
- Coordinates: 36°36′15″N 83°40′25″W
- Topo map: USGS Middlesboro South

The Cumberland Gap is a pass in the eastern United States through the long ridge of the Cumberland Mountains, within the Appalachian Mountains and near the tripoint of Kentucky, Virginia, and Tennessee. At an elevation of 1,631 feet (497 m) above sea level, it is famous in American colonial history for its role as a key passageway through the lower central Appalachians.

Long used by Native American nations, the Cumberland Gap was brought to the attention of settlers in 1750 by Thomas Walker, a Virginia physician and explorer. The path was used by a team of frontiersmen led by Daniel Boone, making it accessible to pioneers who used it to journey into the western frontiers of Kentucky and Tennessee. An important part of the Wilderness Road, it is now part of the Cumberland Gap National Historical Park.

== Geography ==
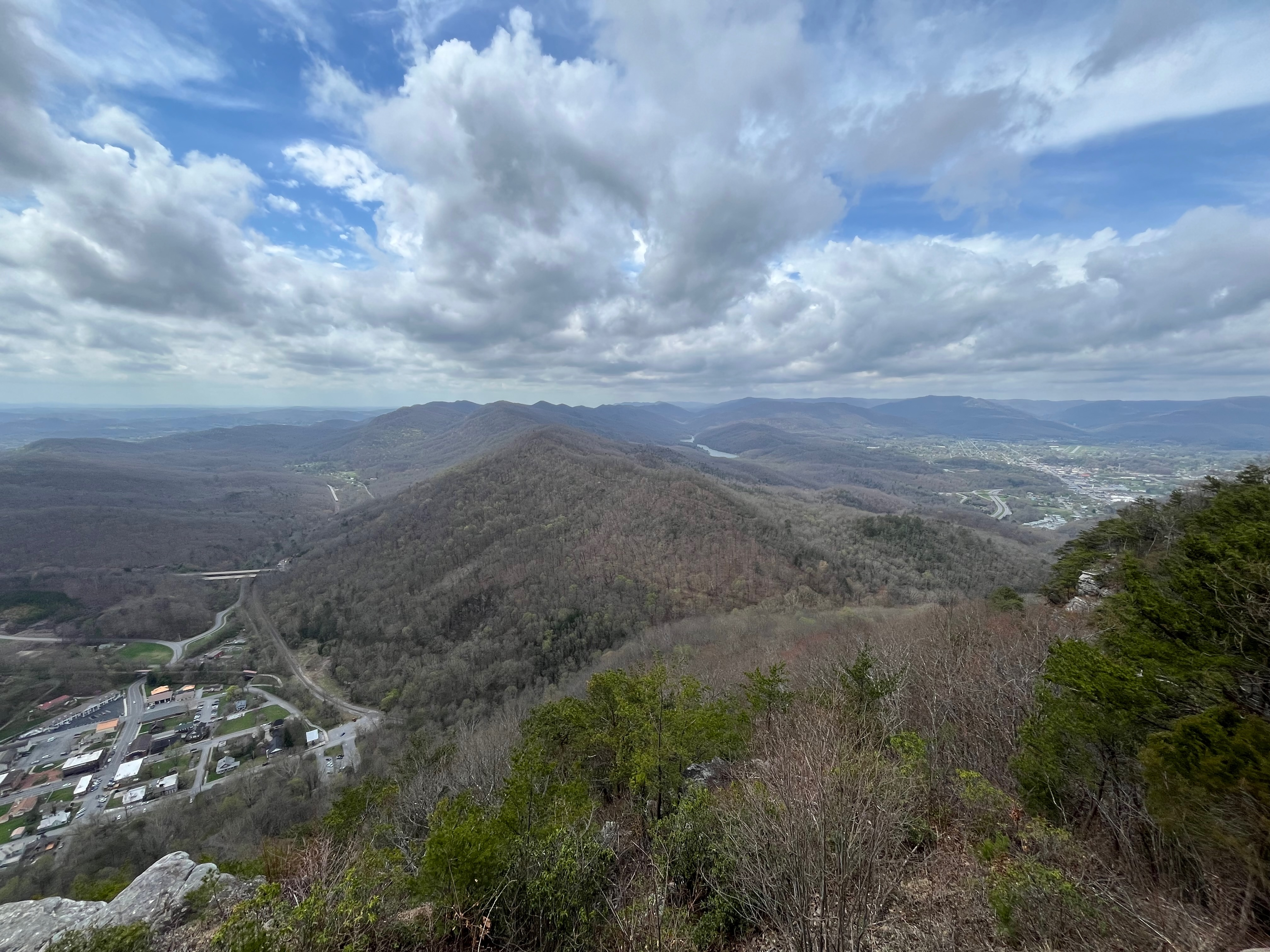
The gap viewed from Pinnacles Overlook in Cumberland Gap National Historical Park in 2025

A map of the Cumberland Gap (red text)

The Cumberland Gap is one of many passes in the Appalachian Mountains, but one of the few in the continuous Cumberland Mountain ridgeline. It lies within Cumberland Gap National Historical Park and is located on the border of present-day Kentucky and Virginia, approximately 0.25 miles (0.40 km) northeast of the tri-state marker with Tennessee.

The V-shaped gap serves as a gateway to the west. The base of the gap is about three hundred feet (90 m) above the valley floor, even though the north side of the pass was lowered twenty feet (6 m) during the construction of Old U.S. Route 25E. To the south, the ridge rises six hundred feet (180 m) above the pass, while to the north the Pinnacle Overlook towers 900 feet (270 m) above at an elevation of 2,505 feet (765 m).

Centrally located in the eastern United States, the region around Cumberland Gap experiences all four seasons. The summers are typically sunny, warm, and humid with average high temperatures in the mid to upper 80s °F (29-32 °C). In the winter months, January through March, temperatures range in the 30s to 40s °F (0s °C) and are generally mild with rain and few periods of snow.

The nearest cities are Middlesboro, Kentucky and Harrogate, Tennessee. The nearby town of Cumberland Gap, Tennessee is named after the gap.

== Geology ==
The gap was formed by the development of three major structural features: the Pine Mountain Thrust Sheet, the Middlesboro Syncline, and the Rocky Face Fault. Lateral compressive forces of sedimentary rocks from deep layers of the Earth's crust pushing upward 320 to 200 million years ago created the thrust sheet. Resistance on the fault from the opposing Cumberland Mountain to Pine Mountain caused the U-shaped structure of the Middlesboro Syncline. The once flat-lying sedimentary rocks were deformed roughly 40 degrees northwest. Further constriction to the northwest of Cumberland Mountain developed into a fault trending north-to-south called the Rocky Face Fault, which eventually cut through Cumberland Mountain. This combination of natural geological processes created ideal conditions for weathering and erosion of the rocks.

The discovery of the Middlesboro impact structure has proposed new details in the formation of Cumberland Gap. Less than 300 million years ago a meteorite, "approximately the size of a football field", struck the earth, creating the Middlesboro Crater. One of three astroblemes in the state, it is a 3.7 mi (6.0 km) diameter meteorite impact crater with the city of Middlesboro, Kentucky built entirely inside it. Detailed mapping by geologists in the 1960s led many to interpret the geological features of the area to be the site of an ancient impact. In 1966 Robert Dietz discovered shatter cones in nearby sandstone, proving recent speculation. Shatter cones, a rock-shattering pattern naturally formed only during impact events, are found in abundance in the area. The presence of shatter cones found also helped confirm the origin of the impact. In September 2003, the site was designated a Distinguished Geologic Site by the Kentucky Society of Professional Geologists.

Without the Rocky Face Fault, it would have been difficult for pack-horses to navigate this gap and the gap in Pine Mountain near Pineville, and it would be improbable that wagon roads would have been constructed at an early date. Middlesboro is the only place in the world where coal is mined inside an astrobleme. Special mining techniques must be used in the complicated strata of this crater.

== History ==
=== Early history ===
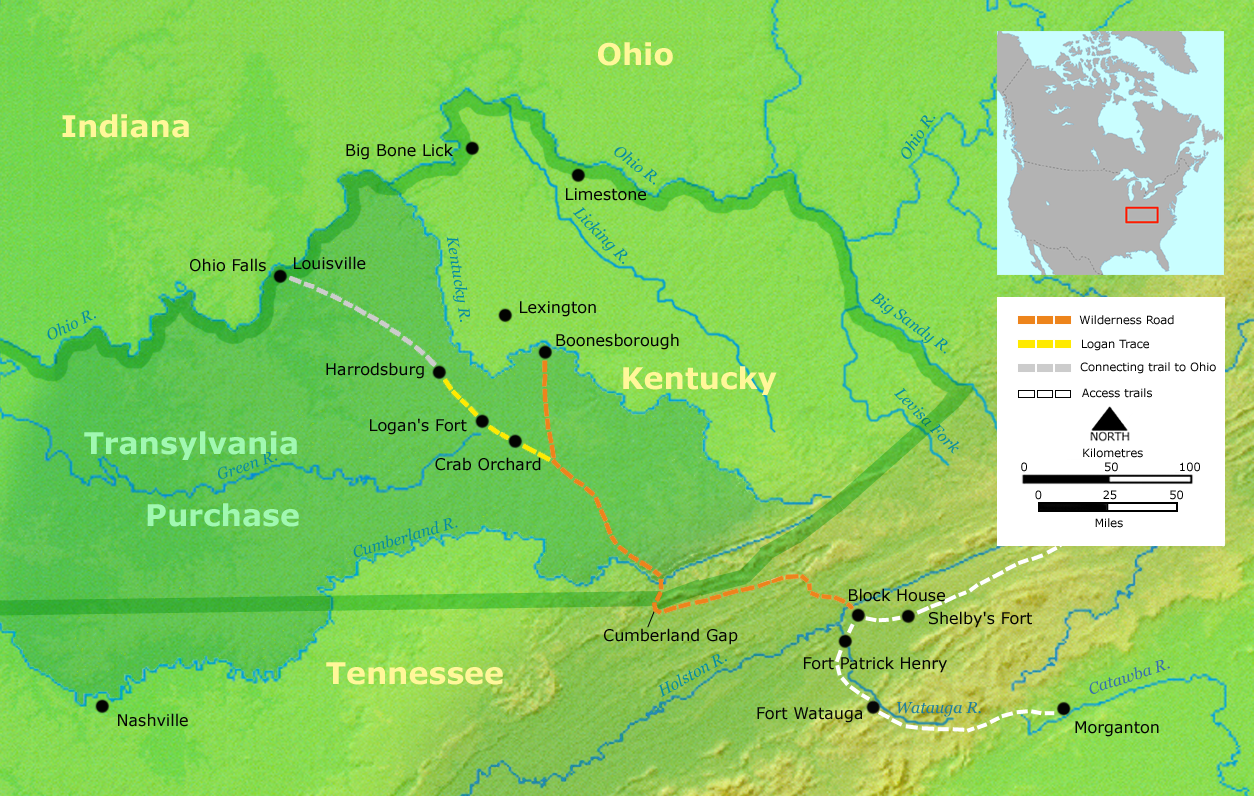
Map showing Cumberland Gap in relation to the Wilderness Road route from Virginia to Kentucky

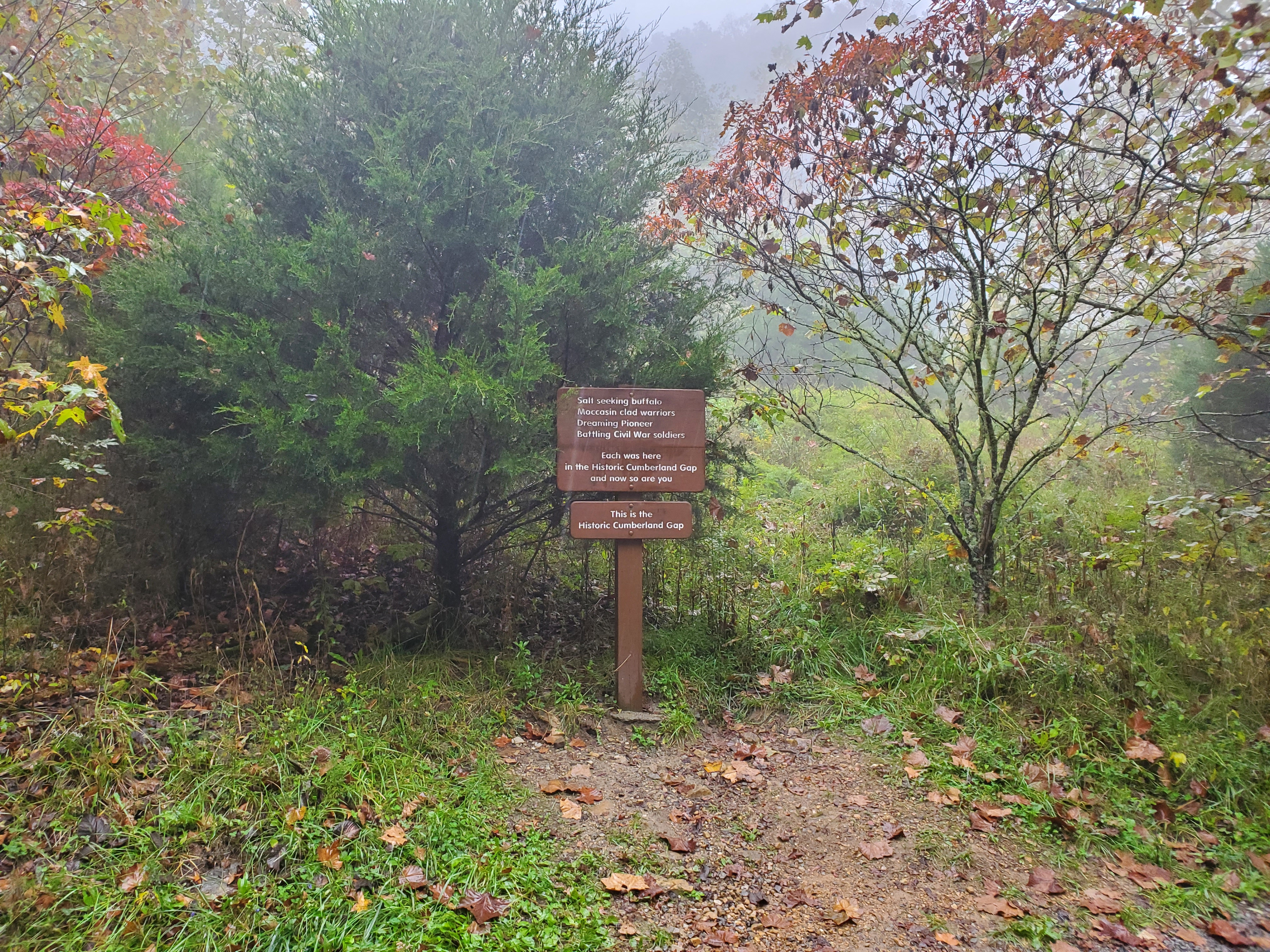
The saddle of Cumberland Gap along the Wilderness Road

The earliest written account of Cumberland Gap dates to the 1670s, by Abraham Wood of Virginia. Sometime before 1748, Samuel Stalnaker is believed to have passed through the gap while exploring the region.

The gap was named for Prince William, Duke of Cumberland, son of King George II of Great Britain, who had many places named for him in the American colonies after the Battle of Culloden. The explorer Thomas Walker gave the name to the Cumberland River in 1750, and the name soon spread to many other features in the region, such as the Cumberland Gap. In 1769 Joseph Martin built a fort nearby at present-day Rose Hill, Virginia, on behalf of Walker's land claimants. But Martin and his men were chased out of the area by Native Americans, and Martin did not return until 1775.

In 1775 Daniel Boone, hired by the Transylvania Company, arrived in the region leading a company of men to widen the path through the gap to make settlement of Kentucky and Tennessee easier. On his arrival, Boone discovered that Martin had already arrived in Powell Valley, where Martin and his men were clearing land for their own settlement – the westernmost settlement in English colonial America at the time. By the 1790s, the trail that Boone and his men built had been widened to accommodate wagon traffic and became known as the Wilderness Road.

=== 19th century ===
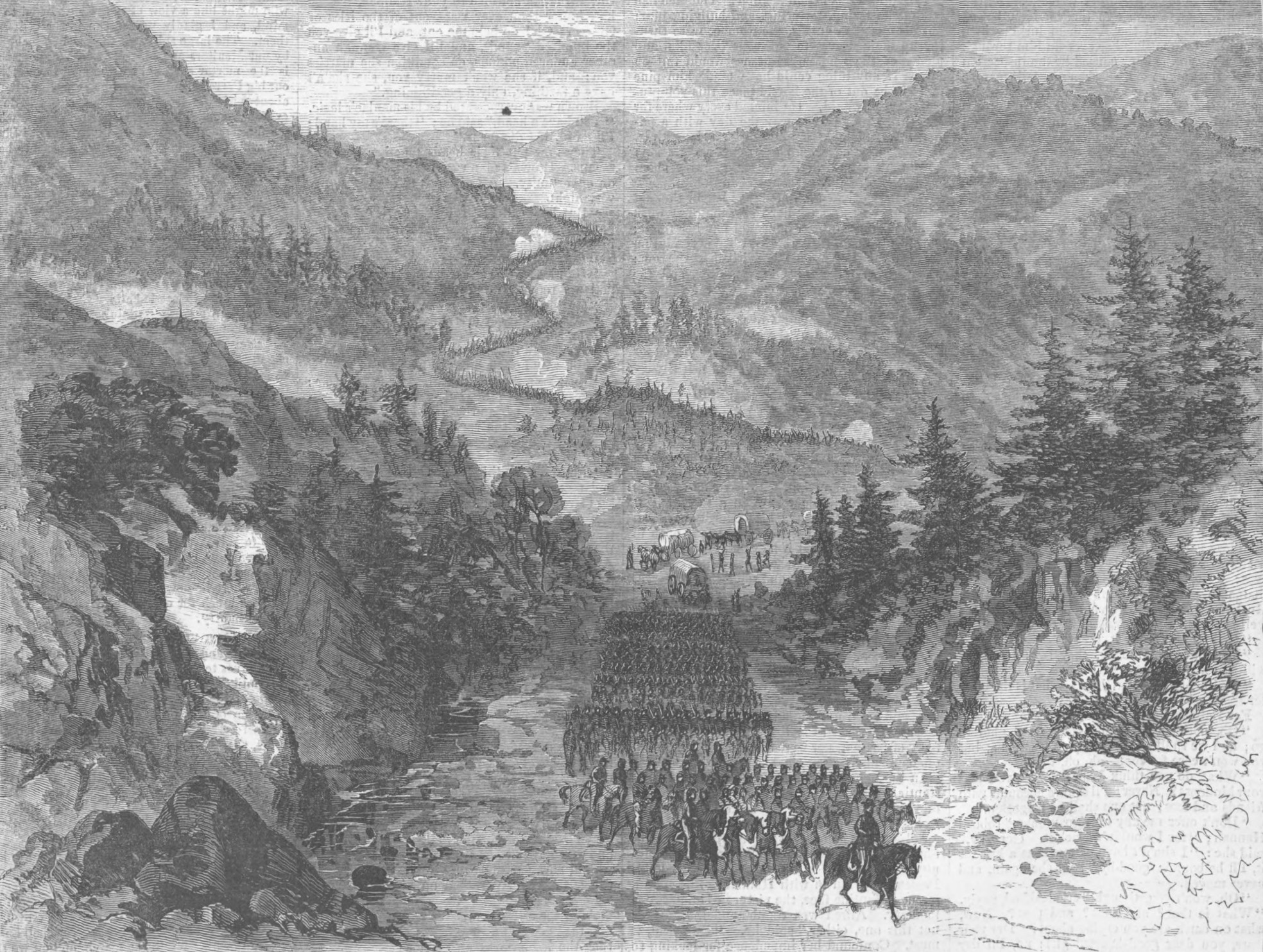
Union soldiers passing through Cumberland Gap, 1863

It is estimated that between 200,000 and 300,000 European-American settlers passed through the gap on their way into Kentucky and the Ohio Valley before 1810.

Several American Civil War engagements occurred in and around the Cumberland Gap and are known as the Battle of the Cumberland Gap. In June 1862, Union Army General George W. Morgan captured the gap for the Union. In September of that year, Confederate States Army forces under Edmund Kirby Smith occupied the gap during General Braxton Bragg's Kentucky Invasion. The following year, in a bloodless engagement in September 1863, Union Army troops under General Ambrose Burnside forced the surrender of 2,300 Confederates defending the gap, gaining Union control of the gap for the remainder of the war.

=== 20th century ===
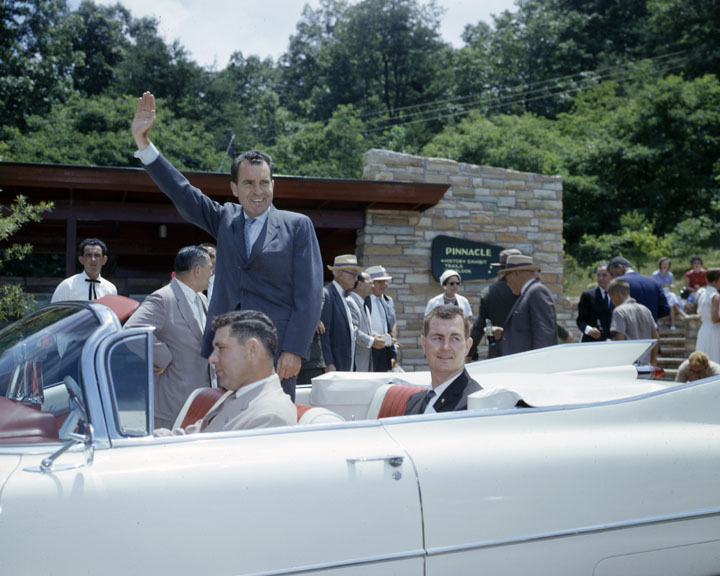
Vice President Richard Nixon at the Pinnacle Interpretive Shelter during his visit to Cumberland Gap National Historical Park to attend the dedication of the park's Visitor Center (Mission 66 project) in July 1959

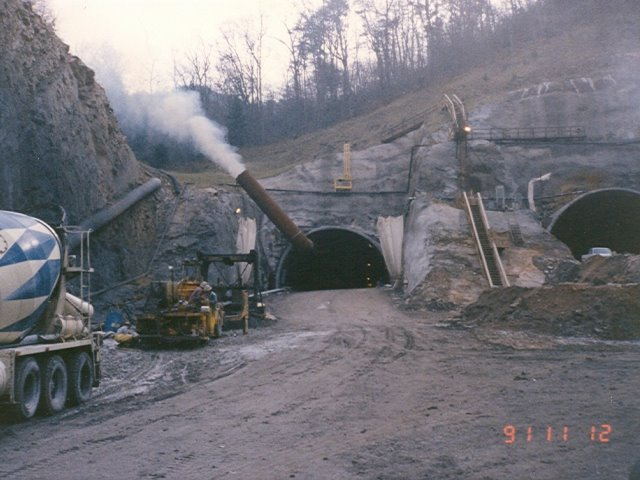
Construction of the Cumberland Gap Tunnel in 1991

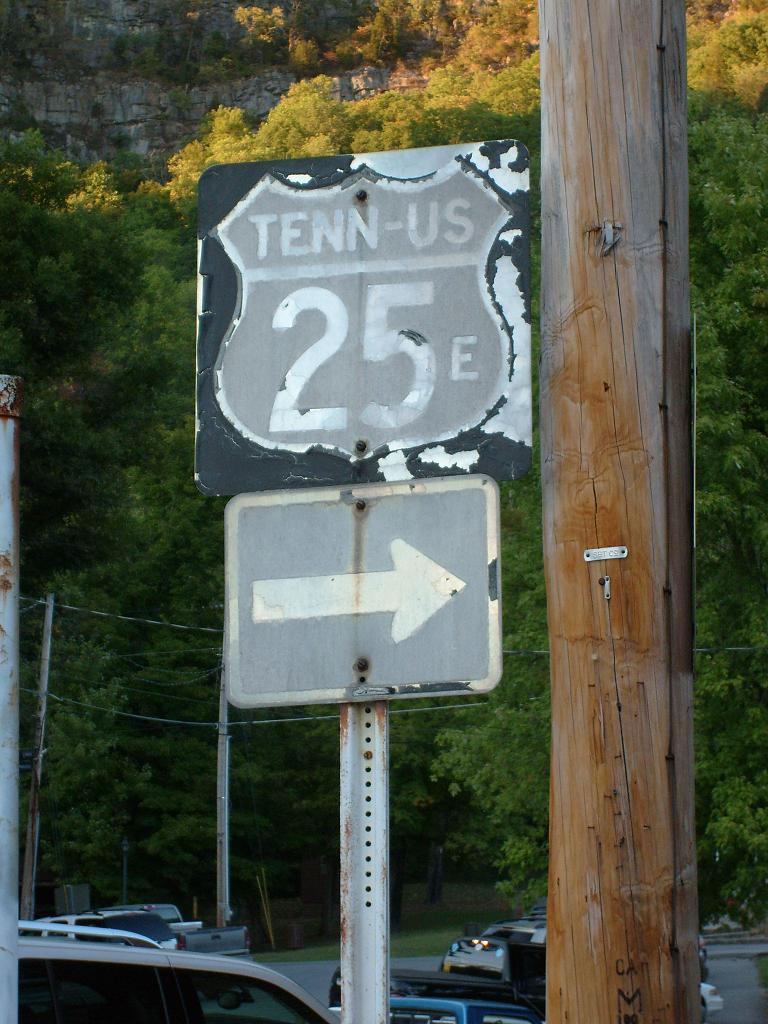
Old US 25E sign

The gap and associated historic resources were listed on the National Register of Historic Places as a historic district on May 28, 1980.

U.S. Route 25E passed overland through the gap before the completion of the Cumberland Gap Tunnel in 1996. The original trail was then restored. As of 1996, 18,000 cars pass beneath the site daily, and 1.2 million people visit the park on the site annually. The park features many hiking trails.

== Biology and ecology ==
Within the Cumberland Gap National Historical Park there are currently 855 known species of vascular plants identified, but that number is expected to increase with reports from National Park Service inventory and monitoring programs. There are 15 various vegetation communities throughout the park, with some of them in special locations, such as mountain bogs, low-elevation wetlands, and rocky bluffs.

Of the 371 species of animals listed as of 2014 within the park, 33 are mammals, 89 are birds, 29 amphibians, 15 reptiles, 27 fish, and 187 are insects; however, many others remain to be included. Visitors to the park can expect to see gray squirrels, white-tailed deer, cottontail rabbits, songbirds, hawks, snakes, turtles, and perhaps black bear or bobcat. Over 120 species of birds have been logged in the park on the website eBird.

== In popular culture ==
=== Music ===
The gap has been mentioned in many songs and is the title of many, including:

- "Cumberland Gap" (first recorded in 1924) a folk song recorded and performed by American folk and bluegrass musicians such as Woody Guthrie and Earl Scruggs, and by British skiffle artists such as Lonnie Donegan and the Vipers Skiffle Group, as well as West Virginia Senator Robert Byrd on his 1978 album U.S. Senator Robert Byrd: Mountain Fiddler.
- "Cumberland Gap", by Frank Hutchison, released in 1931 on Okeh Records (Okeh 45570).
- "Cumberland Gap", by American band Ragged Mountain String Band.
- "Cumberland Blues", by the Grateful Dead on the 1970 album Workingman's Dead.
- "Cumberland Gap", by Jason Isbell and the 400 Unit on the 2017 album The Nashville Sound.
- "Cumberland Gap", by David Rawlings on his 2017 album Poor David's Almanack.
- "Mighty Joe Moon", by Grant Lee Buffalo on their album Mighty Joe Moon.
- "Wagon Wheel", by Old Crow Medicine Show, covered by Darius Rucker.
- "Cumberland Gap", by Xiu Xiu on the album Dear God, I Hate Myself

== See also ==
- Moccasin Gap
- Pound Gap
- List of mountain passes in the Appalachian Mountains
