= Cumberland Gap Tunnel =

Tunnel under Cumberland Gap National Historic Park spanning from Tennessee to Kentucky

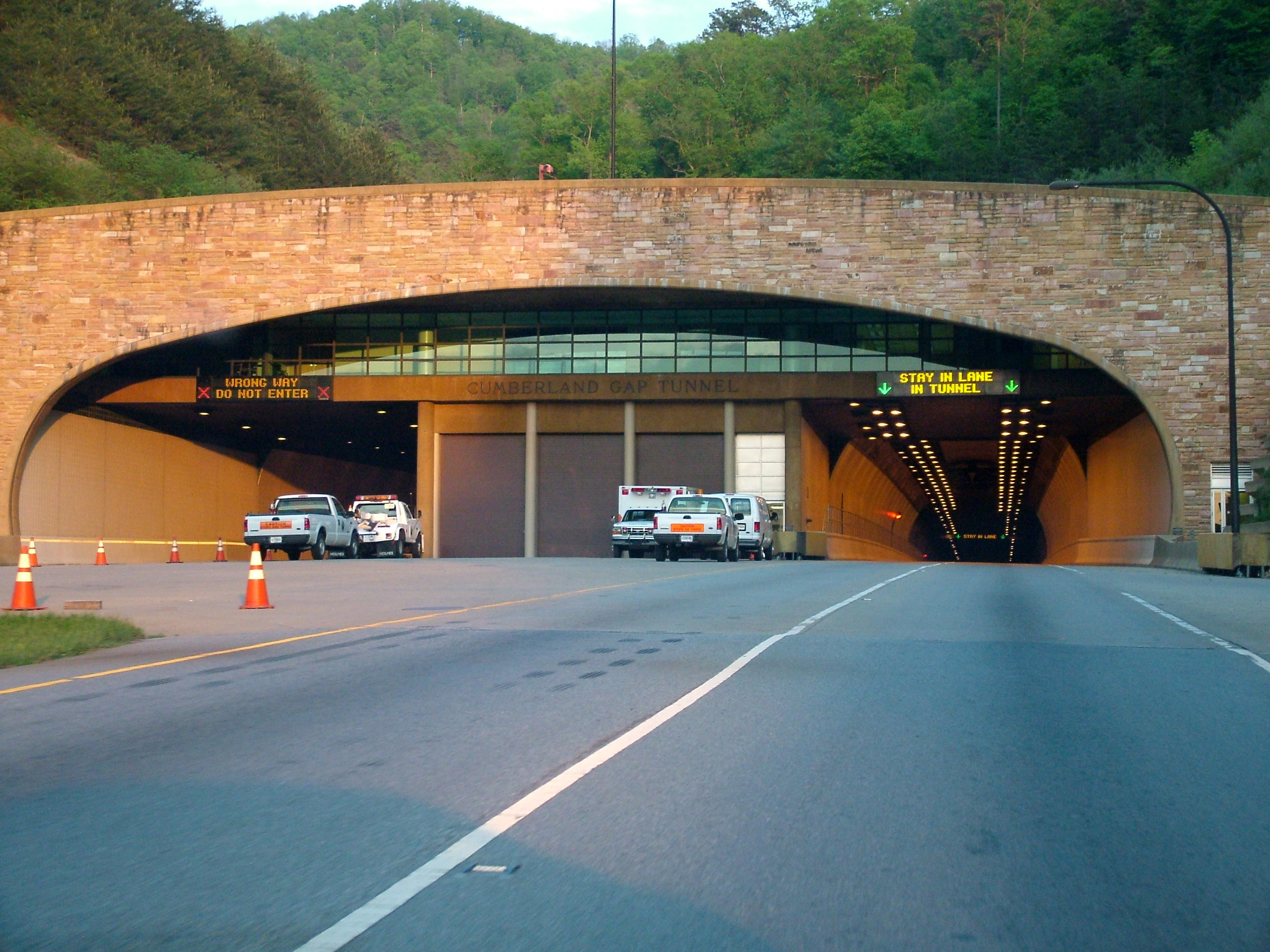

Overview
- Location: Tennessee-Kentucky state line
- Coordinates: 36°35′53″N 83°40′34″W
- Route: US 25E and SR 32
- Crosses: Cumberland Gap
- Start: Cumberland Gap, Tennessee
- End: Middlesboro, Kentucky

Operation
- Work began: June 21, 1991; 35 years ago
- Opened: October 18, 1996; 29 years ago
- Operator: Cumberland Gap Tunnel Authority
- Traffic: automotive
- Character: Controlled-access
- Toll: none
- Vehicles per day: 32,000

Technical
- Design engineer: Parsons Brinckerhoff; Vaughn and Melton
- Length: 4,600 feet (1,400 m)
- No. of lanes: 4
- Tunnel clearance: 16.5 ft (5.03 m)
- Width: 32 ft (9.75 m)

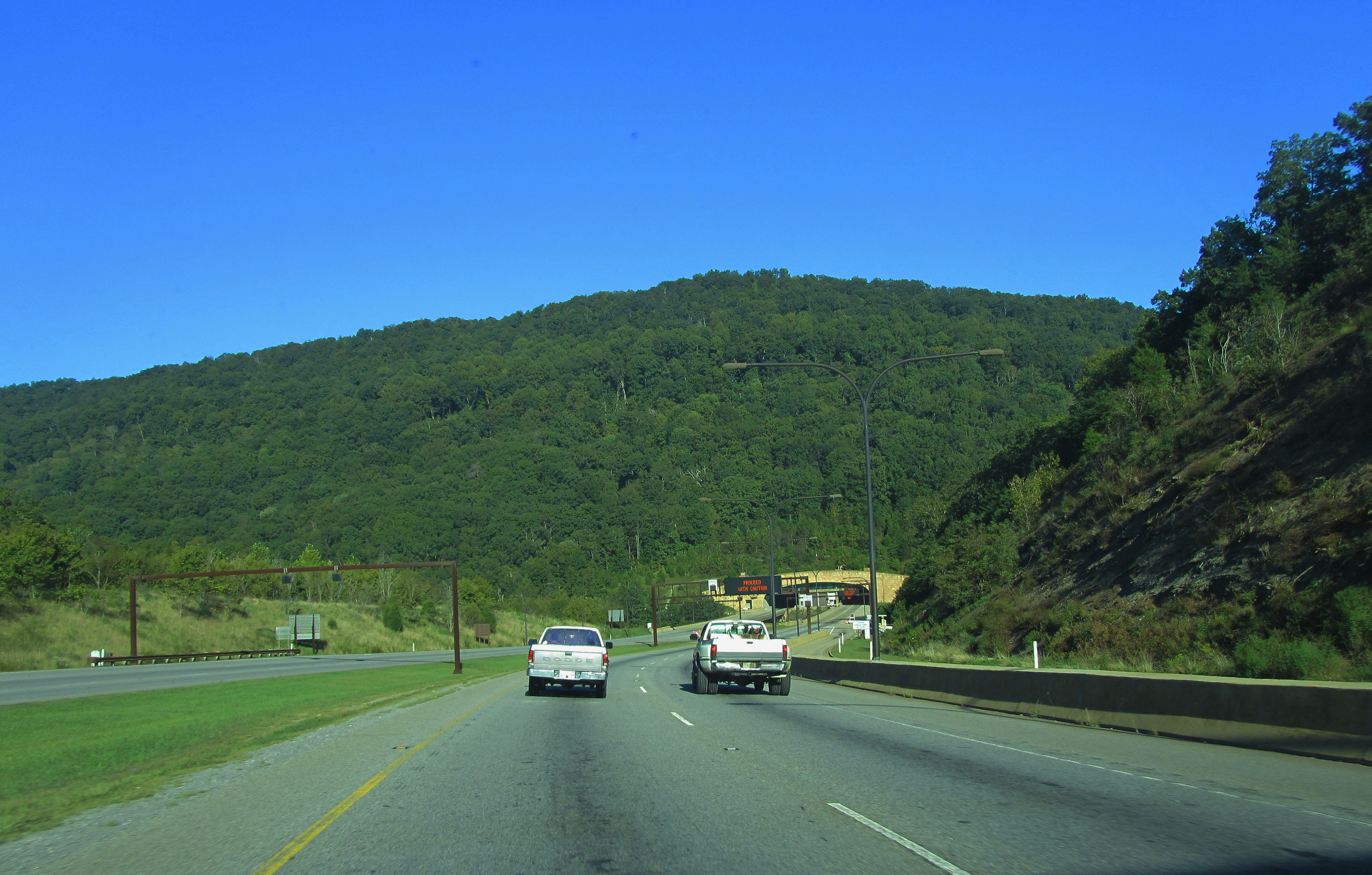
Approach from Cumberland Gap, Tennessee

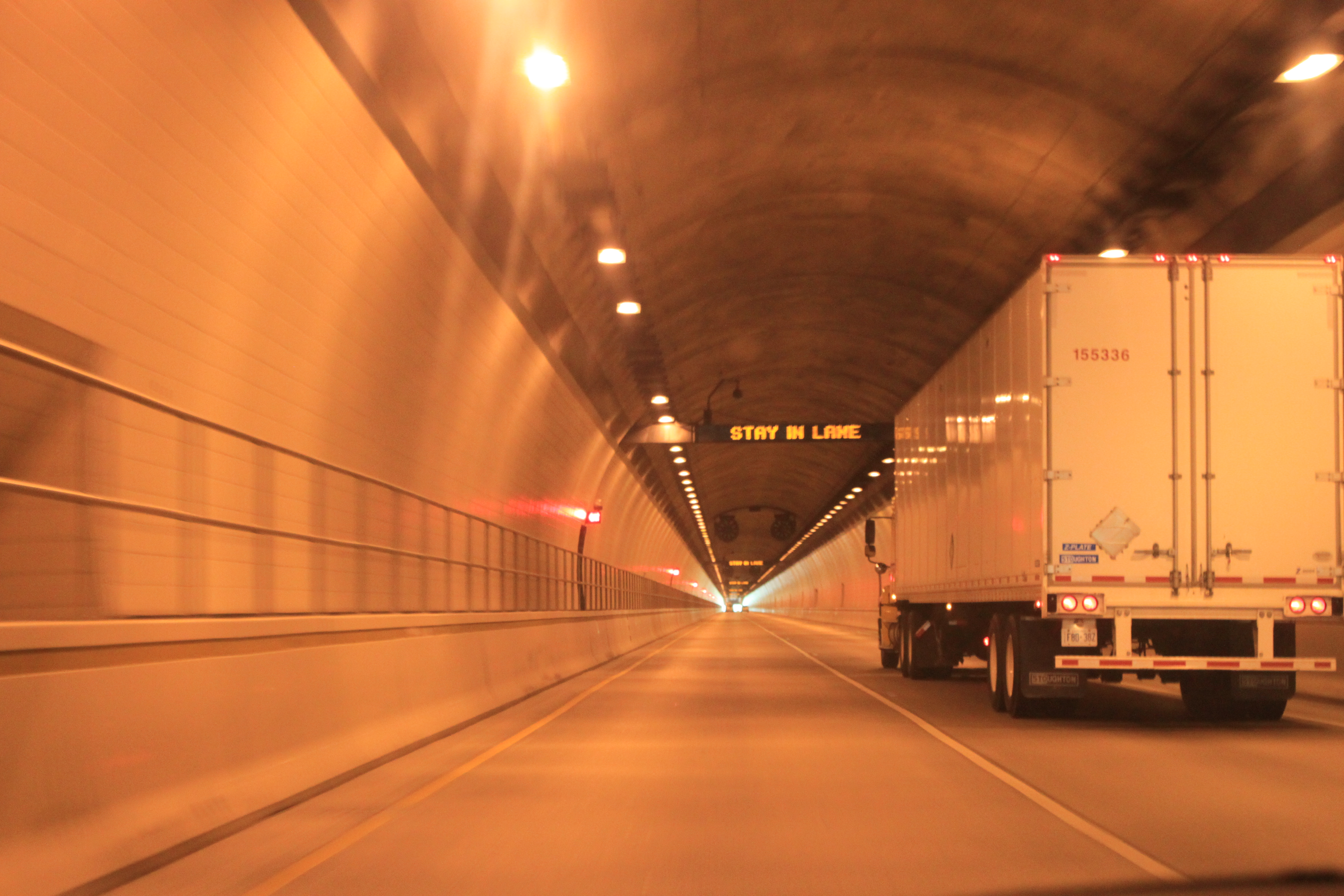
Tunnel interior

The Cumberland Gap Tunnel is a dual-bore, four lane vehicular tunnel that carries U.S. Route 25E under Cumberland Gap National Historical Park near the intersection of Kentucky, Tennessee, and Virginia. The tunnel consists of two separate bores which carry four lanes of traffic between Cumberland Gap, Tennessee, and Middlesboro, Kentucky. It is one of only two mountain vehicular tunnels in the United States that cross a state line, the other being the East River Mountain Tunnel on Interstate 77 and U.S. Route 52 between Virginia and West Virginia. The tunnel opened to traffic in 1996 and replaced a section of highway through the Cumberland Gap that had earned the nickname "Massacre Mountain" due to its hazardous design and high rate of traffic collisions.

== Description ==
The tunnels are located in the Cumberland Mountains, a subrange of the Appalachian Plateau, which is, in turn, a subrange of the Appalachian Mountains. The Cumberland Gap, a mountain pass that was important in American colonial history, is located at its closest point, about 0.4 miles (0.64 km) northeast of the tunnels. The tri-point of Tennessee, Kentucky, and Virginia is located about 0.15 miles (0.24 km) northeast of the tunnel, between the tunnel and the Cumberland Gap. Less than 1/2 mile (0.80 km) past the southern portal of the tunnel is a parclo interchange with the western terminus of U.S. Route 58 (US 58), and the route crosses a railroad about 200 feet (61 m) before entering the southern portal. Upon exiting the northern portal, the highway passes underneath the same railroad about 0.2 miles (0.32 km) later, before reaching a parclo interchange with a connector road to the park's visitor center.

The tunnels consist of two tubes, each 4,600 feet (1,400 m) long. Each tube is 32 feet (9.8 m) wide and 16.5 feet (5.0 m) high, and carries two lanes of traffic. Cross-passages are located between the tubes every 300 feet (91 m), and contain fire extinguishers and phones. Ventilation fans are located on the roofs of each tunnel every 600 feet (180 m). An "illumination zone" is included at each portal to allow drivers' vision to adjust to the lower light level in the tunnel. The speed limit in the tunnel is 45 miles per hour (72 km/h). Lane changes are prohibited inside the tunnel. Trucks carrying Class 1 hazardous cargo (i.e., explosives) are prohibited from using the tunnels, while other hazardous cargo and wide loads are directed to pull off into an area in front of each portal and sent through one at a time with an escort. The tunnels are equipped throughout their entire length and at each approach with closed circuit television (CCTV) cameras, which are connected to monitors in the control rooms. The tunnels also contain a Supervisory Control and Data Acquisition System (SCADA), which is connected to the ventilation fans, carbon monoxide detectors, smoke detectors, and linear heat detectors in each tube. This system is designed to alert the control room operators of any hazards or mechanical malfunctions within the tunnel. Operators also control electronic message boards located inside the tunnels and along the approaches to the tunnels. Identical control rooms are located above each portal, which are staffed by operators 24 hours a day. Administrative offices and training rooms are also located here.

The tunnels are operated and maintained by Tunnel Management, Inc., which uses the trade name Cumberland Gap Tunnel Authority (CGTA). The authority consists of 37 full-time employees, and is divided into an Administrative Team, Mechanical and Electrical Team, and four Operations Teams, the latter of which operate the tunnels. The authority also operates an emergency medical service, fire department, and towing crew.

== History ==
In 1908, the federal government built a macadamized road between Middlesboro, Kentucky to Cumberland Gap, Tennessee called Government Pike that partially passed through the gap. In 1916, the states of Tennessee, Virginia, and Kentucky constructed a road through the Cumberland Gap that connected to the Government Pike. This road, along with part of the Government Pike, became part of US 25E and the Dixie Highway system, and contained several sharp curves. As a result, the 2.3 miles (3.7 km) road through the Cumberland Gap quickly developed a reputation for having a high rate of traffic accidents, earning the nickname "Massacre Mountain". Multiple safety improvements were made to the route in the 1960s. A tunnel to replace the highway through the Gap was first proposed by the National Park Service in 1956. Several studies conducted over the next decade recommended a tunnel be constructed. During this time it was decided that widening the existing surface road to four lanes would adversely affect the historically sensitive areas in the park, making a tunnel the only viable choice.

The first $1.1 million for the construction of the tunnel was allocated by Congress in 1979. That same year, geologists examined the rock types at the proposed location for the tunnels. A contract for initial construction activities was awarded on November 20, 1984, but the Administration of President Ronald Reagan abruptly issued an order to halt the project on December 14, 1984, reportedly in an effort to reduce the Federal budget deficit. After pressure from lawmakers in the area, including Representative Hal Rogers, whose district included the Kentucky portion of the tunnel, Interior Secretary Donald P. Hodel announced on May 15, 1985, that the project would proceed.

Between December 1985 and December 1986, a pilot tunnel 4,100 feet (1,200 m) long, 10 feet (3.0 m) wide, and 10 feet (3.0 m) high was drilled. At this time, the tunnels were expected to be open to traffic by 1991, and cost about $160 million (equivalent to $395 million in 2024). During this excavation, workers discovered thick clay infillings, limestone formations, caves, multiple underground springs and streams, and a lake within the mountain, which caused a leakage of 450 US gallons (1,700 L) of water per minute into the tunnels would later pose a challenge to construction, and increase the cost of the project. To eliminate leakage into the tunnel, the tubes were lined with a thick PVC layer.

Construction was administered by the Eastern Federal Lands Highway Division of the Federal Highway Administration for the National Park Service, with funding provided by both agencies as well as the states of Kentucky and Tennessee. While the project was in the planning phases, Kentucky and Tennessee both began widening their portions of U.S. 25E leading to Cumberland Gap to four lanes. Construction inspection, project management and engineering services were administered by Vaughn & Melton Consulting Engineers.

Construction of the actual tubes began on June 21, 1991. Excavation continued simultaneously from both sides, and the tunnels were joined on July 9, 1992. The tunnels opened to traffic on October 18, 1996. The overall construction cost, including the four-lane approach roads at both portals, was $280 million (equivalent to $515 million in 2024).

The southbound tunnel was briefly closed in 2006–2007 for construction. In 2012, the tunnel was partially closed to replace some of the crushed limestone road base with granite.

== See also ==
- East River Mountain Tunnel
