= Linear heat detection =

Linear heat detection (LHD) (also known as linear detection wire or linear heat detection cable or linear heat) is a very commonly used method of fire detection. It can detect a fire anywhere along the length of the cable, and can be of lengths in excess of a kilometer.

Applications can range from building fire alarm systems to mobile plant machinery.

== Operation ==
Linear heat detection (LHD) cable is essentially a two-core cable terminated by an end-of-line resistor (resistance varies with application). The two cores are separated by a polymer plastic, that is designed to melt at a specific temperature (commonly 68 °C for building applications), and without which causes the two cores to short. This can be seen as a change in resistance in the wire.

There are a limited states the LHD cable can be in:

1. Open-circuit - effectively an infinite resistance
2. Fire detection - resistance of the linear heat cable to the short circuit
3. Normal operating condition - apparent resistance will be the same as the end-of-line resistor

== See also ==
- Fire alarm
- Automatic fire suppression
- Distributed temperature sensing
