= Middlesboro, Kentucky =

- City
- City of Middlesboro
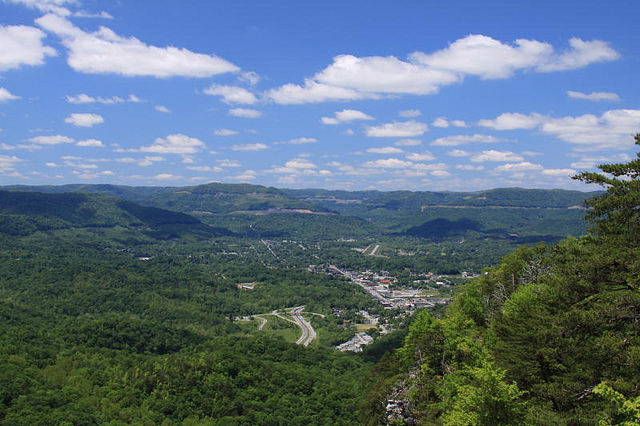
- View of Middlesboro from the Pinnacle Overlook.

- Flag Seal Coat of arms
- Nicknames: The Magic City (official); Queen City of the Cumberlands, The Boro, M'boro, Crater City
- Motto(s): Fac et Spera (Latin: "Do and Hope")
- Location of Middlesborough in Bell County, Kentucky.
- Coordinates: 36°36′37″N 83°43′24″W
- Country: United States
- State: Kentucky
- County: Bell
- Incorporated: March 14, 1890
- Named after: Middlesbrough, England

Government
  - Type: Mayor-Council
  - Mayor: Boone Bowling

Area
  - Total: 7.46 sq mi (19.33 km^{2})
  - Land: 7.38 sq mi (19.12 km^{2})
  - Water: 0.077 sq mi (0.20 km^{2})
- Elevation: 1,142 ft (348 m)

Population (2020)
  - Total: 9,405
  - Estimate (2022): 9,131
  - Density: 1,273.7/sq mi (491.78/km^{2})
- Time zone: UTC-5 (Eastern (EST))
  - Summer (DST): UTC-4 (EDT)
- ZIP code: 40965
- Area code: 606
- FIPS code: 21-51924
- GNIS feature ID: 498153
- Website: www.cityofmiddlesboro.com

Middlesboro (locally /ˈmɪdəlzbʌrə/) is a home rule-class city in Bell County, Kentucky, United States. The population was 10,334 at the 2010 U.S. census, while its micropolitan area had a population of 69,060.

It is located 1 mile (1.6 km) west of the Cumberland Gap and is the largest city in southeastern Kentucky. It is located entirely between Pine Mountain and the Cumberland Mountains in the Middlesboro Basin, an enormous meteorite crater (one of three known astroblemes in the state).

== Name ==
Originally founded by English businessmen, the town opened its first post office on September 14, 1888, under the name Middlesborough, presumably in honor of the English town of – at the time – the same name, although that town in fact has the spelling 'Middlesbrough'. The city was formally incorporated under that spelling on March 14 two years later, but the post office switched to "Middlesboro" in 1894 and that spelling has since been adopted by the city itself, the city's school district, the Kentucky Land Office, and the U.S. Board on Geographic Names.

== History ==
=== Early history ===
The area was originally inhabited by American Indians such as the Shawnee. The first European known to have visited the area was Gabriel Arthur in 1674. He was later followed by Thomas Walker in 1750 and Daniel Boone in 1769.

=== Pittsburgh of the South ===
John Turner of Virginia established the settlement of Yellow Creek nearby in 1810, but the town did not begin to develop until the Scottish-born and Canadian-raised engineer and entrepreneur Alexander Arthur took an interest in the Yellow Creek Valley. Having settled in Knoxville, Tennessee, he arranged development projects in the area as part of the post-war New South. Taking an interest in the iron deposits around the Cumberland Gap around 1886, Arthur was able to convince some of the wealthy scions of Gilded-Age Asheville, North Carolina, to talk to their families about funding a "Pittsburgh of the South", but sufficient financing was not forthcoming. He then traveled to England, where he was able to find interested backers for his "Magic City" of 250,000 residents enjoying running water, electricity, a large sporting commons, and electric trams in the middle of Appalachia. Simultaneously, he funded and began construction on the Powell's Valley Railroad, with the aim of connecting the Cumberland Gap region to Knoxville.

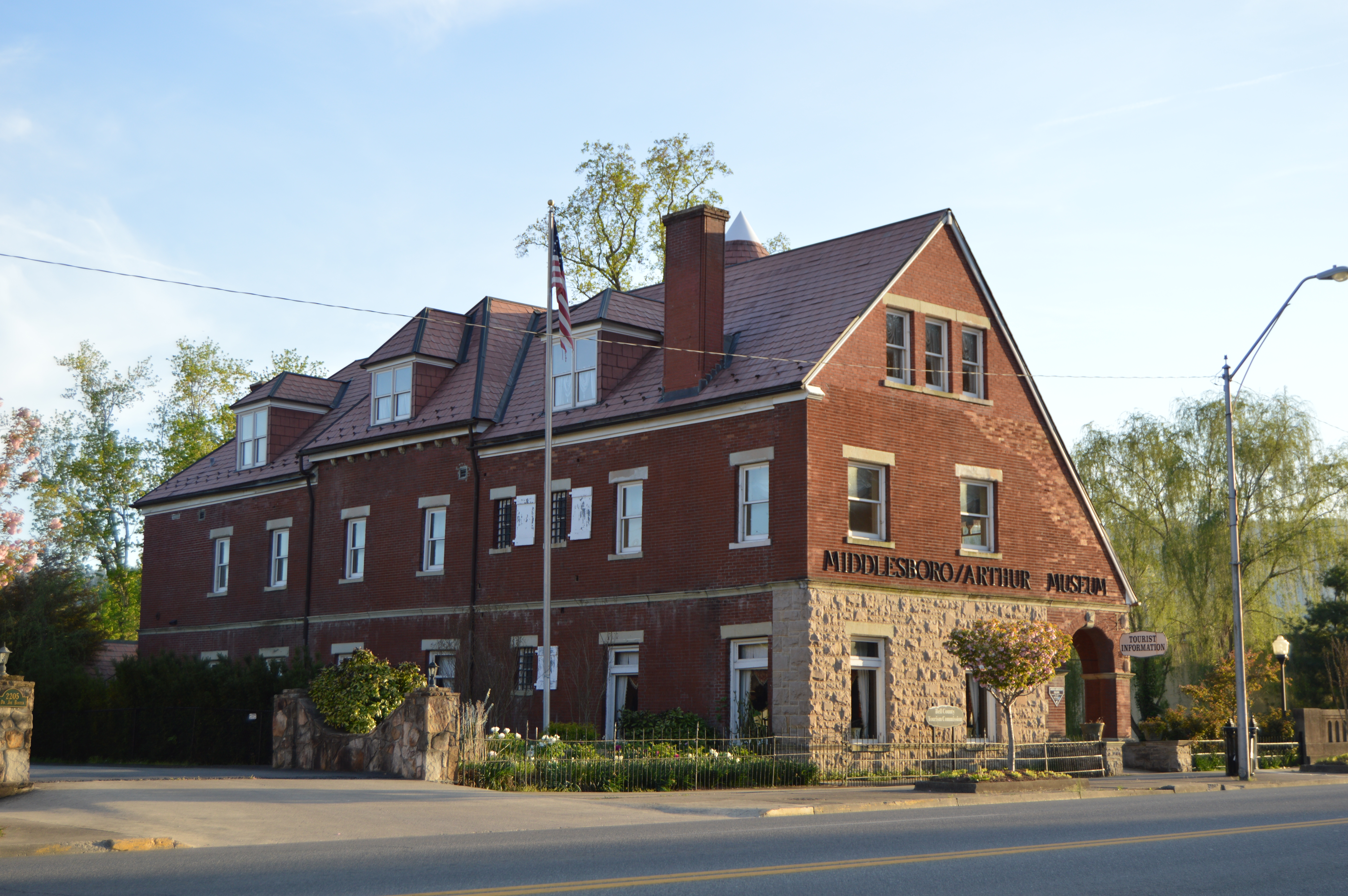
The Alexander Arthur Museum

By 1888, the new town was platted and named "Middlesborough", presumably after the English town, either after a local contest selected it as the best entry or after the hometown of the brothers who owned the local English Hotel. (Note: Rennick details the importance of the hotel but mistakenly ascribes it to a "Mr. Watts" when in fact it was owned by two brothers – Frank and Edgar Watts – involved with Alexander Arthur's development plans.) The Middlesboro Country Club was founded as part of Arthur's original development. Its nine-hole course is one of the oldest in the United States and it claims to be the oldest continuously played course in the country. Pianist Ben Harney is also claimed to have originated ragtime music in Middlesboro, where he played in local saloons in the early 1890s. Boosters from Middlesborough petitioned to host the 1892 World's Fair. Just south of the Cumberland Gap in the area of the present-day Lincoln Memorial University, a $1-million Four Seasons Hotel was built in 1892 with 500 rooms, a 200-room spa, and a sanitarium.

Arthur's project failed by 1893. The Cumberland Gap had turned out to be too steep for locomotives and, in order to connect Middlesboro to the Tennessee line, an expensive tunnel needed to be constructed from 1888 to 1889, (Note: The tunnel actually ran directly beneath the corner between Kentucky, Tennessee, and Virginia, although the Virginia section was entirely underground.) ultimately necessitating the dissolution of the Powell Valley Railroad and its recapitalization as the Knoxville, Cumberland Gap, & Louisville. Rebuilding from a devastating fire in 1890 used up more capital and time and the poor quality of local ore meant that revenue from Arthur's steel mills was insufficient to weather the Panic of 1893 on Wall Street. Arthur's development of the area finished, the post office was renamed the following year after the already-prevalent local spelling "Middlesboro". The Knoxville, Cumberland Pass, & Louisville was bought out by the L&N in 1896. The local newspaper, the Middlesboro Daily News, was established in 1911.

Despite being the largest city in the county, the development of Middlesboro came too late to avoid Pineville's being the seat of the local courthouse. The two cities have remained friendly rivals since Middlesboro's founding.

=== Little Las Vegas ===
Middlesboro installed the first electric street cars west of Washington, D.C., to help locals and tourists visiting the city which became known as "Little Las Vegas" in the 1930s. By this time, Middlesboro was full of slot machines, saloons, and brothels. During this period, shootouts in the streets were part of daily life. The town, under rule of the infamous Ball brothers, was featured in newspapers across the country as one of the deadliest, wildest cities in the United States.

=== Athens of the Mountains ===
By the 1950s, Middlesboro had a population of roughly 15,000 residents. Their strong support for the arts led to the city being called "the Athens of the Mountains". It was one of the few cities in the Eastern Coal Fields to boast a grand opera house and it hosted one of the finest school districts in the state. The first shopping mall was built in the city during the 1960s. The city was named an "All Kentucky City" in 1964, '65, '66, '67, and '69, a huge honor for such a small city. The Cumberland Gap National Historical Park was also established during this time.

During the 1970s, the area's coal industry revived and the city prospered again. A grand centennial celebration was held in 1990 that included a ball, air show, and beauty pageant, as well as the dedication of a new city park. The Cumberland Gap Tunnel was opened in 1996.

=== Present-day ===
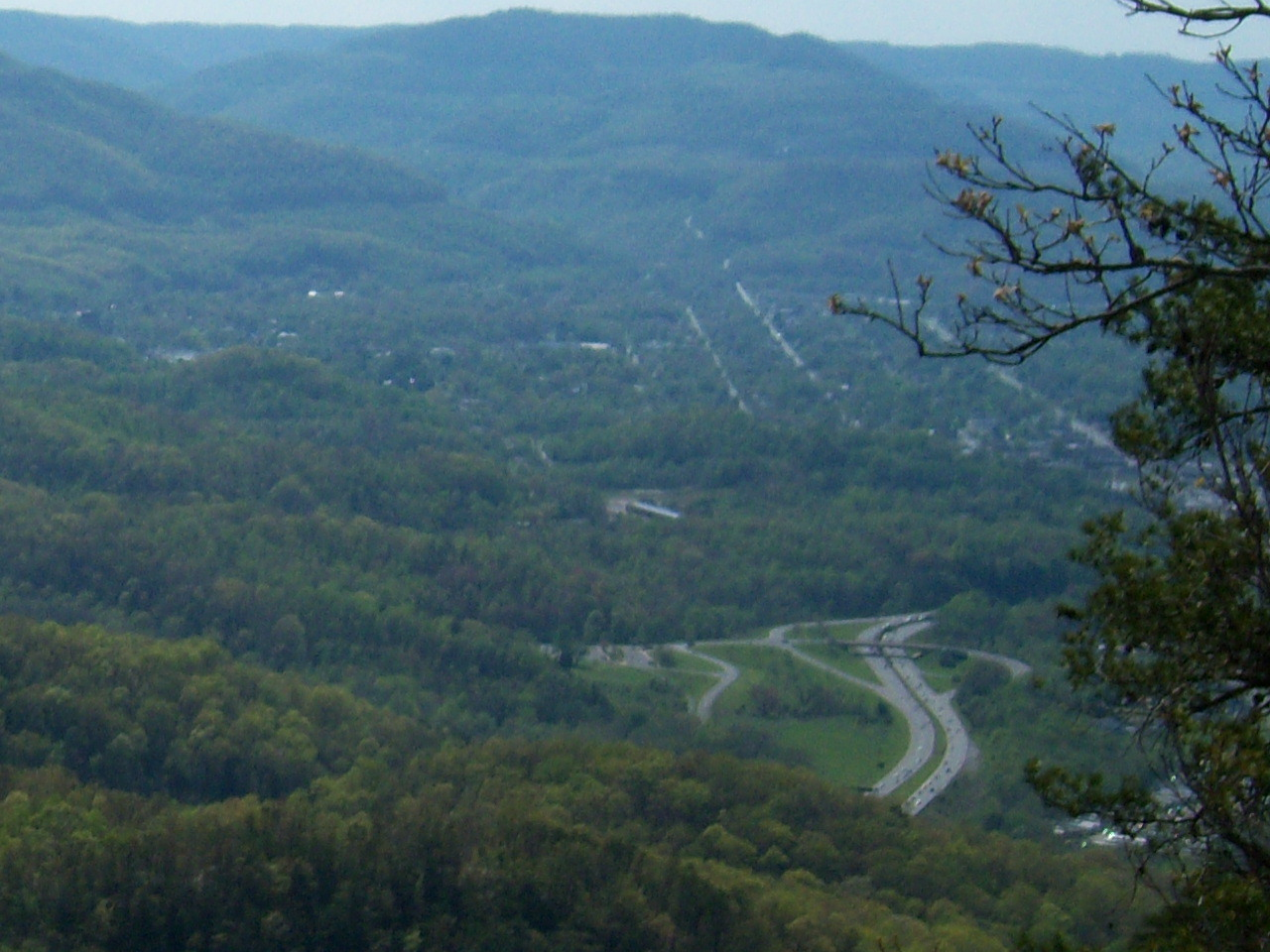
View of Middlesboro from Cumberland Gap National Historical Park

Currently, Middlesboro is investing in downtown revitalization to help create new business and give the city a better image. In 2004, Discover Downtown Middlesboro, Inc. (DDM), was formed to promote and lead the revamping of the historic downtown area. Since its inception, Discover Downtown Middlesboro has helped numerous businesses receive a facelift and has restored the historic Fountain Square in downtown. The organization also helps to create awareness of the city's grand and regal past. Numerous large-scaled sepia murals are placed throughout downtown, paying homage to the founder of Middlesboro, his wife, and other historic points in the history of Middlesboro. DDM also hosts numerous events for the community and the tri-state area that are free to the public, one of the most popular includes the Downtown Ducky Dash and Block Party. DDM oversees all projects that take place within the downtown area and has plans to create brick stamped crosswalks at Fountain Square. Ultimately, they plan to make the historic downtown area more pedestrian-friendly with more benches, bike racks, planters, and streetscape improvements in the works. Recently, the organization has applied for nearly $1 million in grant money for the purpose of preservation and development of the general downtown district. Currently, DDM has invested in a Preservation Plan, which should be unveiled in September 2013. This plan, once complete, will outline the plans for the revitalization of downtown Middlesboro, help create a brand for the downtown area, as well help lay a foundation to preserve the rich architectural details in the downtown historic district.

In June 2011 a severe flash flood damaged many homes and businesses in Middlesboro. Following a rainfall of 8.5 in (22 cm) in 48 hours, the waterways could not cope with the deluge. Two area residents perished in the flood, and dozens were left homeless. The downtown area was one of the hardest hit areas in the city. At one point during the rain event, enough water was present throughout the entire downtown area that vehicles were completely submerged. For many hours after the flood, travel in and around the city was very difficult due to large amounts of standing water in the basin that Middlesboro is built in. A few days afterwards, Governor Steve Beshear toured the area and formally declared it a disaster, permitting state funds to be used in rebuilding.

In April 2012, Middlesboro became the first city in the United States to have a community-wide organic garden, which features 60 raised-bed gardens that will be used to grow food for people in the community. Some beds are even disability accessible. The beds will be given out on a first come, first served basis. The food that is grown in the beds will help to reduce costs for families in need, and can be donated to people in need or sold to local restaurants. The community organic garden was made possible through the City of Middlesboro, Bell County Health Department, and several donors and volunteers. Middlesboro is currently working to become one of the first cities in Kentucky to be a certified Trail Town. The Mayor, along with the City Council, showed support and took initiative in becoming a certified Trail Town. This feat will be a collaboration between the Bell County Tourism Commission, Bell County Adventure Tourism, Discover Downtown Middlesboro, Bell County Chamber of Commerce, and the City of Middlesboro.

Middlesboro was featured on the History Channel's television series How the States Got Their Shapes in the episode "Forces of Nature". The city also featured in one of the BBC's Wonders of the Solar System episodes. ABC's Good Morning America honored the Middlesboro-Bell County Library for participating in the "52 Weeks of Giving" program on May 27, 2013.

On September 15, 2015, Middlesboro held an election to allow alcohol production and retail in the city limits. Previously, all of Bell County had been dry except for the special circumstance of a state park in Pineville, Kentucky. Allowing alcohol in the city would make Bell County a Moist County. The vote passed 1,298-yes to 1,179-no. With such a close vote, tension arose around the topic of alcohol allowance in the small community.

Beginning in the summer of 2015, Discover Downtown Middlesboro is the recipient of a grant from the Levitt Foundation of California. This grant provides funding for a series of 10 outdoor music concerts each summer. The concert venue is a formerly abandoned lot near the main intersection of town at 20th & Cumberland Ave. Middlesboro is one of 15 cities across the nation to be chosen for the Levitt AMP series.

== Geography ==
Middlesboro is located at 36°36′37″N 83°43′24″W (36.610146, -83.723230). The city sits just inside the Cumberland Gap, along U.S. Route 25E, and is located inside of a meteorite crater.

According to the United States Census Bureau, the city has a total area of 7.6 square miles (20 km^{2}), all but 0.09 square miles (0.23 km^{2}) of which is land. U.S. 25E provides four-lane connection to Interstate 75 at Corbin, 45 miles (72 km) to the northwest. With the recently completed renovations on U.S. 25E, travelers now have four-lane connection to Interstate 81 at Morristown, Tennessee, 45 miles (72 km) to the south.

=== Climate ===
Middlesboro experiences a humid subtropical climate with distinct four seasons. Average high is 87 °F (31 °C) in July, the warmest month, with the average lows of 24 °F (−4 °C) occurring in January, the coolest month. The highest recorded temperature was 112 °F (44 °C) in July 1930. The lowest recorded temperature was −18 °F (−28 °C) in January 1985. Average annual precipitation is 42.8 inches (1,090 mm), with the wettest month being March, averaging 5.25 inches (133 mm).

Climate data for Middlesboro Fire Department, Kentucky (1981–2010 normals, extremes 1892–2009)
Month	Jan	Feb	Mar	Apr	May	Jun	Jul	Aug	Sep	Oct	Nov	Dec	Year
Record high °F (°C)	77 (25)	84 (29)	93 (34)	100 (38)	100 (38)	102 (39)	112 (44)	105 (41)	104 (40)	94 (34)	90 (32)	78 (26)	112 (44)
Mean daily maximum °F (°C)	45.1 (7.3)	49.7 (9.8)	59.2 (15.1)	69.2 (20.7)	77.4 (25.2)	84.6 (29.2)	87.4 (30.8)	86.0 (30.0)	80.4 (26.9)	69.8 (21.0)	59.4 (15.2)	47.7 (8.7)	68.0 (20.0)
Daily mean °F (°C)	35.1 (1.7)	38.5 (3.6)	46.2 (7.9)	55.3 (12.9)	63.7 (17.6)	72.0 (22.2)	75.3 (24.1)	74.4 (23.6)	67.8 (19.9)	56.4 (13.6)	47.1 (8.4)	37.6 (3.1)	55.8 (13.2)
Mean daily minimum °F (°C)	25.0 (−3.9)	27.3 (−2.6)	33.2 (0.7)	41.5 (5.3)	50.0 (10.0)	59.4 (15.2)	63.3 (17.4)	62.7 (17.1)	55.2 (12.9)	43.1 (6.2)	34.7 (1.5)	27.5 (−2.5)	43.6 (6.4)
Record low °F (°C)	−18 (−28)	−20 (−29)	−4 (−20)	15 (−9)	26 (−3)	28 (−2)	40 (4)	40 (4)	30 (−1)	16 (−9)	3 (−16)	−11 (−24)	−20 (−29)
Average precipitation inches (mm)	4.18 (106)	4.03 (102)	4.39 (112)	4.28 (109)	4.58 (116)	4.28 (109)	4.89 (124)	4.74 (120)	3.45 (88)	2.73 (69)	3.80 (97)	4.54 (115)	49.89 (1,267)
Source: NOAA

== Demographics ==
Historical population
Census	Pop.	Note	%±
1890	3,271		—
1900	4,162		27.2%
1910	7,305		75.5%
1920	8,041		10.1%
1930	10,350		28.7%
1940	11,777		13.8%
1950	14,482		23.0%
1960	12,607		−12.9%
1970	11,878		−5.8%
1980	12,251		3.1%
1990	11,328		−7.5%
2000	10,384		−8.3%
2010	10,334		−0.5%
2020	9,405		−9.0%
2024 (est.)	8,899		−5.4%

As of the census of 2000, there were 10,384 people, 4,443 households, and 2,927 families residing in the city. The population density was 1,359.1 inhabitants per square mile (524.8/km^{2}). There were 4,955 housing units at an average density of 648.5 units per square mile (250.4 units/km^{2}). The racial makeup of the city was 92.84% White, 4.90% African American, 0.38% Native American, 0.63% Asian, 0.04% Pacific Islander, 0.19% from other races, and 1.02% from two or more races. Hispanic or Latino of any race were 0.79% of the population.

There were 4,443 households, out of which 28.4% had children under the age of 18 living with them, 43.1% were married couples living together, 18.3% had a female householder with no husband present, and 34.1% were non-families. 31.5% of all households were made up of individuals, and 14.2% had someone living alone who was 65 years of age or older. The average household size was 2.30 and the average family size was 2.88.

In the city, the population was spread out, with 23.6% under the age of 18, 8.9% from 18 to 24, 26.6% from 25 to 44, 23.9% from 45 to 64, and 17.0% who were 65 years of age or older. The median age was 39 years. For every 100 females, there were 83.5 males. For every 100 females age 18 and over, there were 78.1 males.

The median income for a household in the city was $19,565, and the median income for a family was $25,016. Males had a median income of $23,285 versus $19,040 for females. The per capita income for the city was $13,189. About 24.4% of families and 28.1% of the population were below the poverty line, including 41.2% of those under age 18 and 16.5% of those age 65 or over.

== Transportation ==
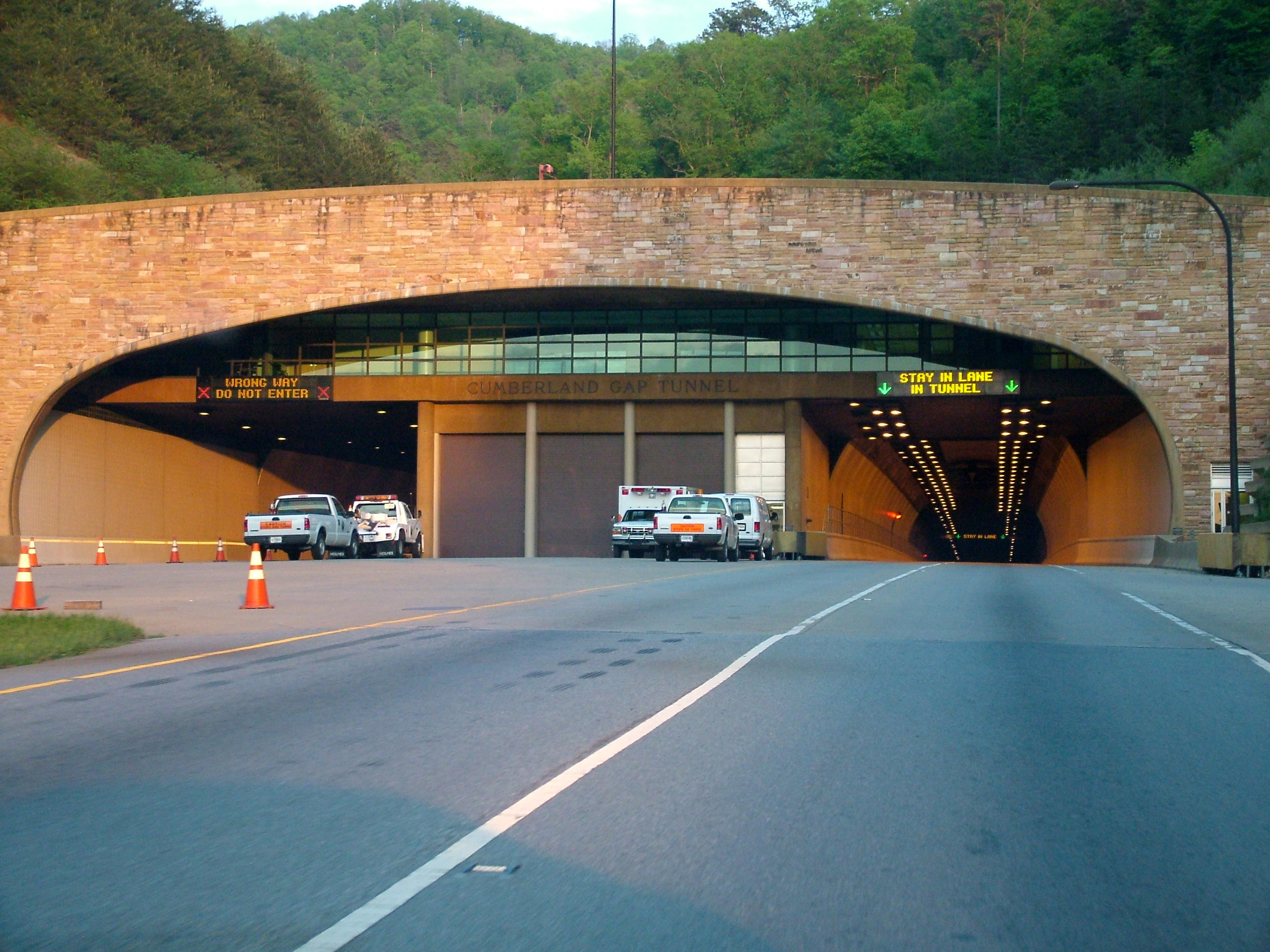
Cumberland Gap Tunnel

The city's main thoroughfare is U.S. 25E. The U.S. 25E Tunnel (a.k.a. the Cumberland Gap Tunnel) is a .87-mile (1.40 km) tunnel that travels underneath the famous Cumberland Gap. The northern terminus is located in Middlesboro and the southern terminus is in Cumberland Gap, Tennessee. Middlesboro is one of the few cities in Kentucky that was not built on or near a significant waterway, so it is not reachable by water. The only major body of water near the city is Fern Lake, a small lake that sits on the Kentucky-Tennessee border. A man-made canal flows through the heart of the city. The canal channels Yellow Creek from the western part of the city through downtown and then heads north, northeast out of the city. The Middlesboro Canal was built by a large number of immigrants soon after the city was founded. The canal is home to numerous populations and species of ducks, all of which are considered to be honorary citizens of the city, despite the traffic headaches they may cause. Traffic and pedestrians must yield the right of way to the ducks at all times and anyone caught harming the ducks could face fines or jail time. Due to Middlesboro being known around the region for the large duck population, the canal serves as the "raceway" for the Downtown Ducky Dash rubber duck race held annually in August by Discover Downtown Middlesboro.

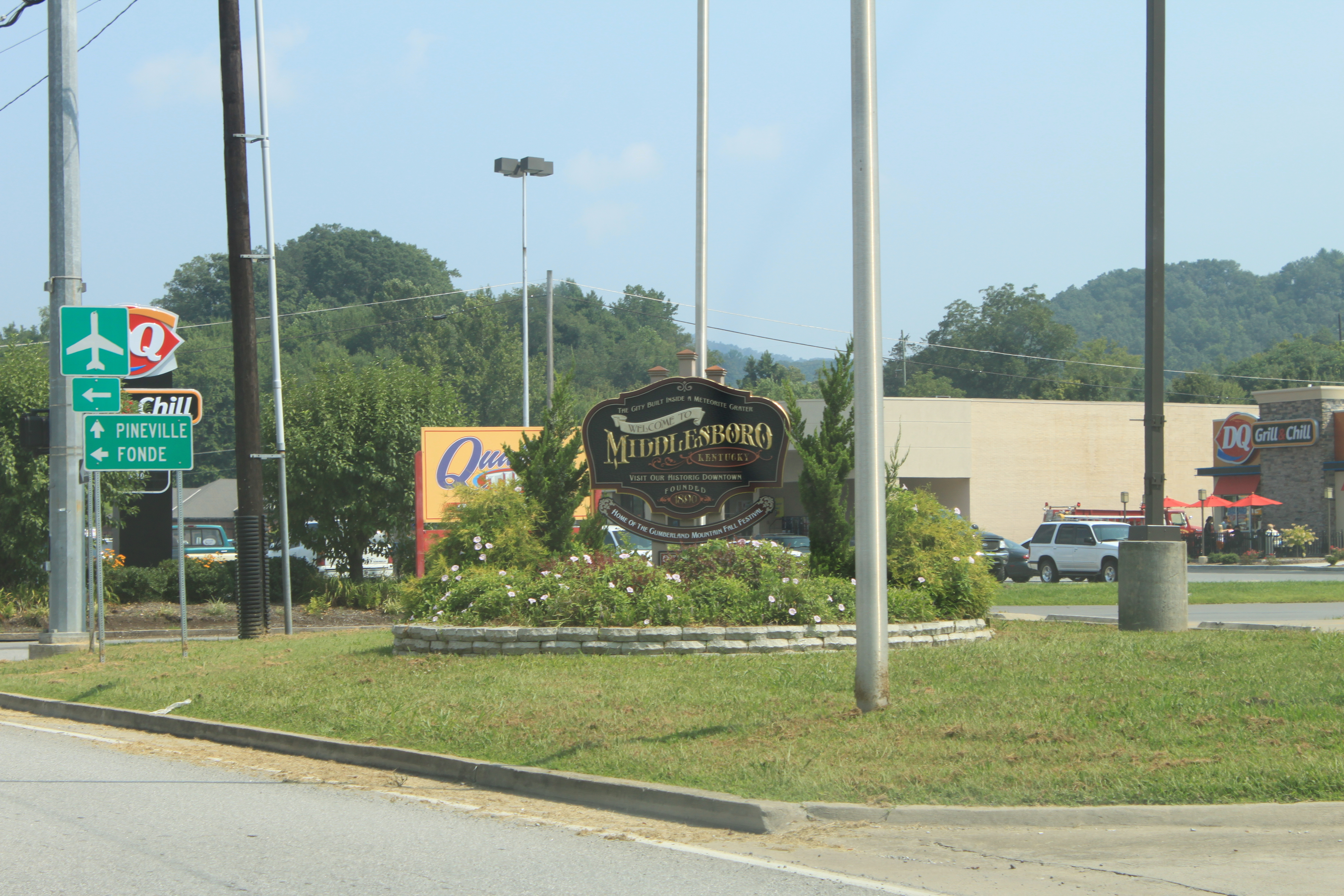
Welcome sign coming into the city.

Middleboro's main thoroughfare is named Cumberland Avenue, which runs through Middlesboro's historic downtown district. Discover Downtown Middlesboro, Inc. (DDM) is a non-profit downtown revitalization effort charged with the restoration of the downtown area. DDM has been around since 2004 and since then, has restored Middlesboro's famed Fountain Square, completed many historical murals in town, started and formed a farmer's market, updated signage in the downtown area, and received grants for new plantings for the numerous planters that line Cumberland Avenue. Many of the streets which run parallel to Cumberland Avenue (east-west) are named for peerages and locales in Britain, while perpendicular (north-south) streets are named numerically. U.S. 25E is also known as 12th street, with higher numbers found as one moves west.

=== Airport ===
Middlesboro is served by the Middlesboro-Bell County Airport, which is a single runway, general aviation airport and is the second oldest airport still in use in Kentucky, ranking behind Bowman Field in Louisville.. The airport was established in 1944, however, the first recorded flight into the city was in 1912. It serves as the home for 26 aircraft and more than 18,000 operations annually. The Middlesboro-Bell County Airport was also the home of the famed P-38 Lightning, Glacier Girl. The aircraft was restored on site at the airport, where she made her first maiden flight in October 2002. The airport has recently undergone a major renovation, including the addition of a brand new terminal that features public restrooms, lounge, kitchen, and a radio room that can be used for up-to-date weather information. Other renovations/additions include a jet fuel tank, which will allow more air traffic to use the facility. In the near future, the airport plans to widen and expand the current runway and taxiway, plus add new hangars for aircraft, new runway lighting, and an Aircraft Weather Observation System (AWOS). The closest major airport to Middlesboro is the McGhee Tyson Airport in Knoxville, Tennessee, which is 75.5 miles (121.5 km) away.

== Education ==
Middlesboro has a public library, a branch of the Bell County Public Library District.

== Economy ==
Middlesboro is home to Middlesboro Mall, the only enclosed shopping mall in the area. The area also features Middlesboro Crossing, a recently constructed strip mall on the north end of the city.

== Sports ==
Middlesboro was home to several minor league baseball teams between 1913 and 1963. The Middlesboro Athletics were members of the Class D Mountain States League (1949–1954). Earlier, the Middlesboro Colonels played in the, Appalachian League (1913–1914). After the Athletics, Middlesboro returned to the Appalachian League with the Middlesboro Senators (1961–1962) and Middlesboro Cubsox (1963). Middlesboro was an affiliate of the Washington Senators (1961–1962) and both the Chicago Cubs & Chicago White Sox (1963). The teams played at Hilltop Speedway Park.

== Notable people ==
- Joseph Bosworth, Businessman, lawyer, and politician
- Lela E. Buis, writer
- Gerry Bussell, defensive back for the Denver Broncos
- David Grant Colson, U.S. Representative in 19th Century
- Jamie Coots, Pentecostal pastor who died from a snake bite suffered during a church service
- Ben Harney, ragtime pianist
- Matt Jones, host of Kentucky Sports Radio
- Lee Majors, actor, The Six Million Dollar Man and The Fall Guy was raised in the town as a child
- Leonard F. Mason, Medal of Honor recipient
- Henry Harrison Mayes, evangelist, known for religious signs and markers along US highways
- William McElwee Miller, American missionary to Persia and author
- Julie Parrish, actress, The Doberman Gang
- Trish Suhr, comedian and actress
- Georgia Turner, singer of the "Rising Sun Blues"
- Vann "Piano Man" Walls, rhythm-and-blues pianist
- Leo Wardrup, Navy officer and Virginia state legislator
- John White, U.S. Representative and former speaker of the U.S. House of Representatives

== See also ==
- Middlesboro crater
- Colson House
- Cumberland Gap National Historical Park
