= Nola Art House =

Coordinates: 29°58′10.3″N 90°4′9.8″W

The Nola Art House (formerly known as GNOAM) was a Creole mansion (built c.1870) located on Esplanade Avenue in New Orleans's Faubourg Tremé. John Orgon founded the space in 2005 in order to offer affordable housing to New Orleans–based artists. The vision was to maintain a facility which would unite professional artists with one another, who in turn could exchange ideas and feedback, or collaborate with one another on projects. The house was divided into private rooms that doubled as studio work spaces. The house's parlors and expansive hallways afforded a professional gallery space for residents to showcase their work. The property was sold in July 2014 to new owners with different objectives, and the artists who were involved at the Art House have moved on to other projects.

== Treehouse installation ==
The treehouse installation was the brainchild of Scott Pterodactyl. This multi-tiered treehouse featured a rope bridge to a separate, smaller treehouse, a waterslide and wastebaskets. The height of the fourth and fifth levels offered a view of downtown and the surrounding area. The treehouse was disassembled in July 2014 following the sale of the property to new owners.
