= 64th Cavalry =

64th Cavalry may refer to:

- 64th Cavalry (India)
- 64th Cavalry Division (Soviet Union), a Soviet division
- 64th Cavalry Division (United States)
- 64th Virginia Mounted Infantry Regiment, sometimes called the 64th Virginia Cavalry

== See also ==
- 64th Division (disambiguation)
- 64th Brigade (disambiguation)
- 64th Regiment (disambiguation)
- 64th (disambiguation)
