= LXIV Corps =

LXIV Corps or 64th Corps may refer to:

- 64th Corps (German Empire)
- LXIV Army Corps, Wehrmacht, Germany
- 64th Fighter Aviation Corps, Soviet Union
- 64th (1st Rutherglen) Lanarkshire Rifle Volunteer Corps, United Kingdom
- 64th (Liverpool Irish) Lancashire Rifle Volunteer Corps, United Kingdom

== See also ==
- List of military corps by number
- 64th Brigade (disambiguation)
- 64th Division (disambiguation)
- 64th Regiment (disambiguation)
- 64th (disambiguation)
