= 64th Army =

64th Army may refer to:

- 64th Group Army, People's Liberation Army, China
- 64th Army (Soviet Union)

== See also ==
- List of armies by number
- 64th Division (disambiguation)
- 64th Brigade (disambiguation)
- 64th Regiment (disambiguation)
- 64th (disambiguation)
