= James Buchanan Richmond =

American politician

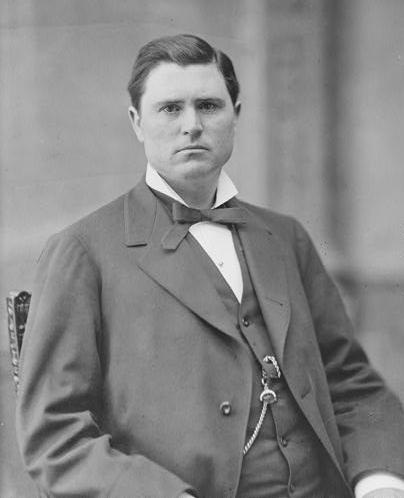

Member of the U.S. House of Representatives from Virginia's 9th district
- In office March 4, 1879 – March 3, 1881
- Preceded by: Auburn Pridemore
- Succeeded by: Abram Fulkerson

Member of the Virginia House of Delegates from the Lee County, Virginia district
- In office January 1, 1874 – December 3, 1875
- Preceded by: William P. Queen
- Succeeded by: Ira P. Robinette

Personal details
- Born: February 27, 1842 Turkey Cove, Virginia, U.S.
- Died: April 30, 1910 (aged 68) Baltimore, Maryland, U.S.
- Party: Democratic
- Spouse(s): Lizzie Duncan, Kate Morison
- Profession: Politician, Lawyer, Judge, Banker

Military service
- Allegiance: Virginia; Confederate States of America
- Branch/service: Virginia Militia; Confederate States Army
- Rank: Colonel (CSA)
- Unit: 15th Virginia Infantry; 64th Virginia Mounted Infantry
- Commands: 64th Virginia Infantry
- Battles/wars: American Civil War

James Buchanan Richmond (February 27, 1842 – April 30, 1910) was a nineteenth-century politician, lawyer, judge and banker from Virginia.

== Early and family life ==
Born in Turkey Cove, Virginia, on February 27, 1842, to Jonathan Richmond and his wife Mary Dickenson Richmond, James Richmond had many brothers and sisters. He attended Emory and Henry College, then read law.

He married Sarah Elizabeth (Lizzie) Duncan in 1864 and had a son (Henry C. L. Richmond) and daughter (Mary Elizabeth Richmond Cox Deisher) before her death. The year following Lizzie's death, Richmond married Catherine (Kate) Morison (1844–1911) of Scott County. His son, Henry C. L. Richmond, like his father became a lawyer and later married the daughter of Richmond's fellow 64th Virginia officer, Harvey Gray.

== Career ==
Richmond began his legal practice in the circuit and county court of Lee County and neighboring Scott and Wise Counties as well as in the court of appeals in Wytheville, Virginia.

== Confederate service ==
As the American Civil War began, Richmond enlisted in the Confederate Army, as did his elder brothers William, Jonathan and Henry (although Jonathan died of typhus in August 1861). James Richmond initially served as an orderly sergeant and was promoted to captain of Company A of the 15th Virginia Infantry. When that was consolidated with the 64th Virginia Mounted Infantry in late 1863 (where his brother William was a Captain), James Richmond received a promotion to major and later another promotion to lieutenant colonel. He served under Col. Auburn Pridemore (whom he later defeated to represent the same Congressional district).

== Political career ==
After Virginia surrendered and James Richmond and his brothers received pardons, he resumed his legal practice. Lee County voters elected him to represent them (part time) in the Virginia House of Delegates in 1873 and he served from 1874 until 1875. Richmond succeeded William P. Queen and was succeeded by Democrat Ira Robinette.

In 1878, advocating sound money, Richmond defeated Congressman Pridemore in the primary, and was elected as a Democrat to the United States House of Representatives. He served a single term, from 1879 to 1881, losing in the Democratic primary to fellow Confederate veteran Abram Fulkerson, who helped organize the Readjuster Party but retired after one term.

In 1886, the Virginia General Assembly elected Richmond judge for Scott County, Virginia. He served for six years, from 1886 to 1892. He then became chief counsel of the South Atlantic & Ohio Railroad Company for several years, and also engaged in banking. Richmond also represented Scott County at the Virginia Constitutional Convention of 1902, which disenfranchised black and poor white voters, but attempted to modernize treatment of corporations.

== Death and legacy ==
Richmond died at Johns Hopkins hospital in Baltimore, Maryland, on April 30, 1910. His son Henry C. L. Richmond, who also attended Emory and Henry College before becoming a lawyer, served as Commonwealth Attorney of Scott County 1891–1895, and again 1919–1920, resigning when elected mayor of Gate City in 1920. He was a Republican like Campbell Slemp and his son C. Bascom Slemp, who were both born less than a mile from James B. Richmond and represented the 9th Congressional district in the early 20th century. A Virginia highway marker near Seminary, Virginia recognized all three Congressmen born nearby.

U.S. House of Representatives
Preceded by Auburn Pridemore	Member of the U.S. House of Representatives from Virginia's 9th congressional district March 4, 1879 – March 3, 1881	Succeeded by Abram Fulkerson
