= Henry C. Slemp =

American politician and military officer

Member of the Virginia Senate from the Lee. Wise and Buchanan Counties district
- In office December 1, 1875 – December 2, 1879
- Preceded by: Auburn L. Pridemore
- Succeeded by: Henry C. Wood

Member of the Virginia House of Delegates from the Lee County, Virginia district
- In office December 6, 1893 – December 3, 1895
- Preceded by: M. B. Spencer
- Succeeded by: S. S. Surgener

Personal details
- Born: August 6, 1832 Turkey Cove, Virginia, US
- Died: January 11, 1901 (aged 68)
- Party: Democratic
- Education: Roanoke College; University of Virginia School of Law
- Profession: Lawyer

Henderson Clinton Slemp (August 6, 1832 – January 11, 1901), nicknamed "Captain Henry", was a farmer, Confederate officer and Virginia politician who served in both houses of the Virginia General Assembly.

== Early and family life ==
Born near Turkey Cove in Lee County, Virginia, to Sebastian Smyth Slemp and his wife, the former Margaret Reasor, both of families long prominent in the region, Henry Slemp had a younger brother, Campbell Slemp, and two elder sisters, Nervesta Overton Slemp Flanary and Alpha Slemp Habourn.

He married two or three times and had 18 children. He married his first wife Joannah Barron on March 15, 1853, and their children were: Samuel Slemp (1852- ), Martha Slemp (1854-) Louis Hopkins Slemp (1856-1855), Huey Letcher Slemp (1858-1913), Adela Alice Slemp Flanary (1861-1947) and Bell Slemp (1863-). After her death, he married Malissa Habum on July 16, 1864, and had children Elizabeth Eva Slemp Cox (1867-1945), Milton G. Slemp (1869-), Ulysses S. Slemp (1870-1940), Venus Melissa Slemp (1872-1891), Alpha D. Brahe (1874-1900), Martha Luna Slemp Bailey (1877-1952) and Patton Wise Slemp (1885-1961).

== Career ==
Although his younger brother Campbell Slemp recruited a company of Confederate soldiers after the 1861 harvest, Henry Slemp did not enlist for another year, and he did so in "Harlan County, Tennessee" (presumably Harlan County, Kentucky) on December 1, 1862 by recruiting another company, which became Company S of the 64th Virginia Cavalry.

Captain Henry Slemp was elected to the Senate of Virginia in 1875 and served a single four-year term. He succeeded his superior officer during the war, Auburn L. Pridemore. The district boundaries were changed for the 1879 session, with Buchanan County removed and Wise County added. Henry C. Wood thus succeeded to the revised senatorial district, although his younger brother Campbell Slemp won elected to the Virginia House of Delegates as a Readjuster to represent Lee County in that election. Four years later, the politics of southwest Virginia remaining turbulent, Lee County voters elected Henry Slemp to represent them in the House of Delegates for one term beginning in late 1893. He succeeded M. B. Spencer and was succeeded by S. S. Surgener.

== Death and legacy ==
Captain Henry Slemp died on January 11, 1901 (possibly in Washington, D.C.).

Senate of Virginia
Preceded by Auburn L. Pridemore	Virginia Senator for Lee, Wise and Buchanan Counties); 1875–1879	Succeeded by Henry C. Wood
