= Campbell Slemp =

American politician

Campbell Slemp Sr.
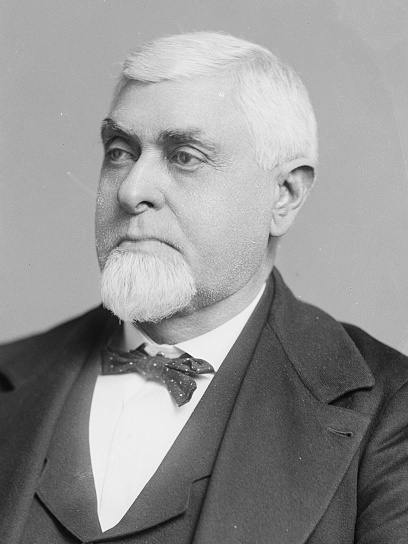

Member of the U.S. House of Representatives from Virginia's 9th district
- In office March 4, 1903 – October 13, 1907
- Preceded by: William F. Rhea
- Succeeded by: C. Bascom Slemp

Member of the Virginia House of Delegates from Lee County, Virginia
- In office December 3, 1879 – December 4, 1883
- Preceded by: Lee S. Fulkerson
- Succeeded by: John B. McLin

Personal details
- Born: Campbell Bascom Slemp Sr. December 2, 1839 Seminary, Virginia, US
- Died: October 13, 1907 (aged 67) Big Stone Gap, Virginia, US
- Party: Republican
- Spouse: Nancy B. Slemp
- Children: 3 sons including C. Bascom Slemp, 3 daughters
- Education: Emory and Henry College
- Profession: farmer, politician

Military service
- Allegiance: Virginia; Confederate States of America
- Branch/service: Virginia Militia; Confederate States Army
- Rank: Colonel (CSA)
- Commands: 21st Virginia Infantry Battalion; 64th Virginia Infantry
- Battles/wars: American Civil War: Battle of Middle Creek

Campbell Bascom Slemp Sr. (December 2, 1839 – October 13, 1907) was a farmer and Confederate officer in southwest Virginia who became a Readjuster Democrat after Congressional Reconstruction and served in the Virginia House of Delegates. He eventually joined the Republican Party and won election to the United States House of Representatives from Virginia's 9th congressional district and controlled federal patronage in the Commonwealth from 1903 to 1907. Slemp died unexpectedly at home while in office, after which his son C. Bascom Slemp succeeded to the seat for more than a decade, until being ousted by the rising Byrd Organization.

== Early and family life ==
Born near Turkey Cove in Lee County, Virginia, to Sebastian Smyth Slemp and his wife, the former Margaret Reasor, both of families long prominent in the region. Campbell Slemp had an older brother, Henderson Clinton Slemp, and two elder sisters, Nervesta Overton Slemp Flanary and Alpha Slemp Habern. He attended Emory and Henry College in Emory, Virginia. He left when his father Sebastian Slemp died in 1859. Before the American Civil War, Campbell Slemp farmed and tended to real estate investments.

Campbell Slemp married Nancy Brittain Cawood (nicknamed "Namie") on July 25, 1861. They had three sons and three daughters: Emma M. Slemp (1865–1889), Henry C.M. Slemp (b./d. 1868), Susan Jane Slemp Newman (1869–1935), C. Bascom Slemp (1870–1943), William Moses Slemp (1873–1912) and Laura Alpha Drucilla Slemp (1877–1900).

== Military career ==
During the Civil War, Slemp volunteered for the Confederate States Army and joined Company A of the 21st Virginia Infantry Battalion, becoming the latter's commanding officer. By November 1862 the unit had been consolidated with another company into the 64th Virginia Mounted Infantry. Slemp rose in rank from captain to lieutenant colonel and finally colonel on December 14, 1862.

The unit defended the border between Virginia and both Tennessee and Kentucky, particularly the strategic Cumberland Gap and the strategic resources of lead mines and salt works at Saltville, Virginia. The Cumberland Gap was initially fortified by Confederate General Felix Zollicoffer (a former Tennessee Congressman), and contested by Unionist Tennessean Capt. Powhatan Carter. Although Zollicoffer was killed in action in the January 1862 during the first Kentucky invasion, Union Generals George H. Thomas and later William T. Sherman had difficulty securing the Cumberland Gap. At Pound Gap in nearby Wise County, Virginia, Slemp was among the Confederates opposed by Union Col. (later General and President) James Garfield, who forced their retreat.

When Union Major General George Morgan was sent to secure the Cumberland Gap, Colonels William M. Churchwell and James E. Rains pleaded for reinforcements but their pleas were ignored; so they destroyed the supplies and evacuated. When the Union troops tried to secure the gap they likewise failed to receive reinforcements, so Confederate Generals Stevenson and Edmund Kirby Smith were able to retake it in September 1862 as Morgan evacuated into Kentucky. The next fall Union Gen. Ambrose Burnside was sent to take the gap and he delegated the job to an Irishman, John F. De Courcy. He got Confederate Gen. John W. Frazer drunk and believing that many Union troops were coming so in the nearly bloodless Battle of Cumberland Gap, Frazer surrendered his three regiments with 2300 men on September 9, 1863, to fewer than 500 Union soldiers. However, Col. Slemp and Maj. McDowell managed to escape with many men, and also evacuated about 400 Confederates from the Pinnacle nearby.

Col. Slemp was convicted of dereliction of duty on November 7, 1863, at a court martial in January 1864, was removed from command and dismissed from the army. The incident related to his moving captured wagons on that date, about two weeks after Union raiders had burned the 64th Virginia's camp near Jonesville. Although many Virginia legislators had urged that General "Grumble" Jones stop the proceedings (and Slemp's Lt.Col. Auburn L. Pridemore attempted to press charges against Gen. Jones for his actions on the same day), charges were pressed by Capt. H. Brown of the 8th Virginia Cavalry and Major Rhea of Tennessee. Col. Slemp hurt his own cause by slipping house arrest in Abington to return home.

Nonetheless, Slemp remained a loyal Confederate throughout the war, surrendering after General Lee's surrender at Appomattox Courthouse. He received his parole at the Cumberland Gap in Tennessee on May 2, 1865, with others of the 64th Virginia.

== Political career ==
After the war ended, Slemp received a pardon, and resumed farming. He became politically involved in the Readjuster Party, aligning with former Confederate General William Mahone who was consolidating railroads in Virginia and Tennessee.]

His older brother Henry C. Slemp had been elected to the Virginia Senate in 1875, and served one term in the part-time position. In 1879, Lee County voters elected Campbell Slemp to the Virginia House of Delegates, where he served (part-time) and was re-elected once. He unsuccessfully ran for the state senate in 1883. Although a Democrat up to that time, Slemp like Malone became a Virginia State Republican party leader. Slemp made an unsuccessful bid for Lieutenant Governor on Mahone's ticket in 1889, which lost badly. However, he was a Presidential elector for Harrison, and later President McKinley.

In 1903 voters of Virginia's 9th congressional district (nicknamed the "Fighting Ninth" in part for its close elections and many party changes) elected Slemp to the United States House of Representatives. Slemp defeated 2-term Democrat William F. Rhea (a generation younger than the Major Rhea who had testified against him), who had defeated 2-term Republican James A. Walker (last commander of the Stonewall Brigade) in 1898.

President Theodore Roosevelt, a fellow Republican, let Slemp control federal patronage in the Commonwealth, Slemp won re-election twice (over J. C. Wysor in 1904 and then Robert P. Bruce in 1906). The Norfolk and Western Railway and textile mills expanded into his district.

== Death and legacy ==
Slemp died unexpectedly at his home at Big Stone Gap in Wise County, Virginia on Sunday, October 13, 1907. Following his interment in the family cemetery in Lee County, Virginia, his son C. Bascom Slemp was selected to fill his Congressional seat, and won re-election several times until he refused to seek re-election. The younger Slemp served as the United States representative for the 9th district of Virginia from 1907 to 1922, and established the Slemp Foundation as well as the Southwest Virginia Museum.

== See also ==
- List of members of the United States Congress who died in office (1900–1949)

U.S. House of Representatives
| Preceded by William F. Rhea | Member of the U.S. House of Representatives from Virginia's 9th congressional district March 4, 1903 – October 13, 1907 | Succeeded by C. Bascom Slemp |
