= Rufus A. Ayers =

Virginia lawyer/businessman/politician/served as Attorney General of Virginia

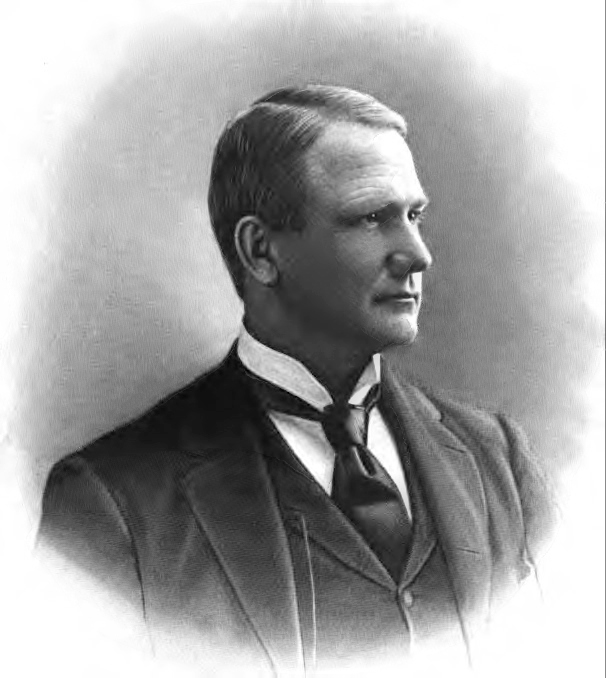
Rufus A. Ayers

Rufus Adolphus Ayers (May 20, 1849 – May 14, 1926) was a Virginia lawyer, businessman, and politician, who served as Attorney General of Virginia.

Ayers was born in Bedford County, Virginia. His family set out for Texas, but passed through Goodson (now Bristol) en route, and decided to stay there. Ayers attended Goodson Academy until it was closed at the start of the Civil War. He never went to school again, for the rest of his life. At age 14, young Ayers ran away and joined the Confederate Army. Although under age, Ayers served for some months as a soldier in East Tennessee.

After the war, Ayers went into business at age 19 in Estillville, now Gate City, Virginia. Encouraged by his uncle, a judge in Bedford, he began to study law and was admitted to the bar in 1872. In 1875, Ayers became the Commonwealth's Attorney for Scott County, Virginia, serving until 1879. Expanding his political career, Ayers served as reading clerk for the House of Delegates from 1875 to 1879, and was appointed a district supervisor by President Rutherford B. Hayes for the 1880 census.

Ayers became one of Southwest Virginia's industrial development leaders. In 1876, Ayers obtained a charter for a railroad from Bristol to Big Stone Gap. That same year he founded the Scott Banner. He participated in the founding of Virginia Coal & Iron Co., which became Virginia's largest coal company, and many other coal companies, as well as banks, a telephone company, and other businesses, and he owned the Big Stone Gap Post.

Ayers became involved with Virginia politics as a member of the Democratic State Committee of the Ninth Congressional District in 1883. The next year, he was Vice-President of the Virginia delegation to the Democratic National Convention in Chicago, at which Grover Cleveland was nominated.

In 1885, Virginia's Democrats nominated Ayers as their candidate for Attorney General, along with Fitzhugh Lee for governor and John E. Massey for lieutenant governor. Besides Ayers, once the under-aged private, the other leading candidate for the nomination was James A. Walker, who had been a Confederate Army general. In the general election, Ayers defeated the incumbent Republican Frank S. Blair. Following the inauguration of Lee, Massey, and Ayers in 1886, the Democrats would control Virginia's statewide offices until 1970.

As Attorney General, Ayers was made a defendant in litigation over Virginia's debt, was held in contempt by the United States Circuit Court, and checked into the Richmond city jail on October 10, 1887. On December 5, before a packed courtroom, the Supreme Court of the United States announced its decision to grant Ayers' petition for habeas corpus. The Virginia Coupon issue was not resolved on the merits until 1890. That same year, the New York Times interviewed Ayers, noting that he had spent six days in jail in the Coupon case, and that Ayers had chosen instead of seeking re-election in 1889 to return to Southwest Virginia, "which is now enjoying a genuine boom."

From 1889 to 1892, Ayers had as his law partner Joseph L. Kelly in Estillville. In 1893, along with his successor as Attorney General, R. Taylor Scott, and William F. Rhea from Bristol, Ayers represented Virginia before the Supreme Court in the boundary dispute with Tennessee over "a strip of land about 113 miles in length, and varying from 2 to 8 miles in width," that would have put all of Bristol, Tennessee in Virginia. They lost. In 1895, Ayers moved his family and his law practice from Scott County to Big Stone Gap.

In 1901-02, Ayers was a delegate to the Virginia Constitutional Convention, serving as Chairman of the Committee on Public Institutions and Prisons.

Ayers ran for Congress in 1912 against the Republican, C. Bascom Slemp, his longtime friend, who purchased Ayers' residence in 1929 and used it to house his collections. Today, Ayers' mansion in Big Stone Gap is the home of the Southwest Virginia Museum Historical State Park.

== Notes and references ==
Legal offices
Preceded by Frank S. Blair	Attorney General of Virginia; 1886–1890	Succeeded by R. Taylor Scott
