= C. Bascom Slemp =

American politician (1870–1943)

Campbell Bascom Slemp
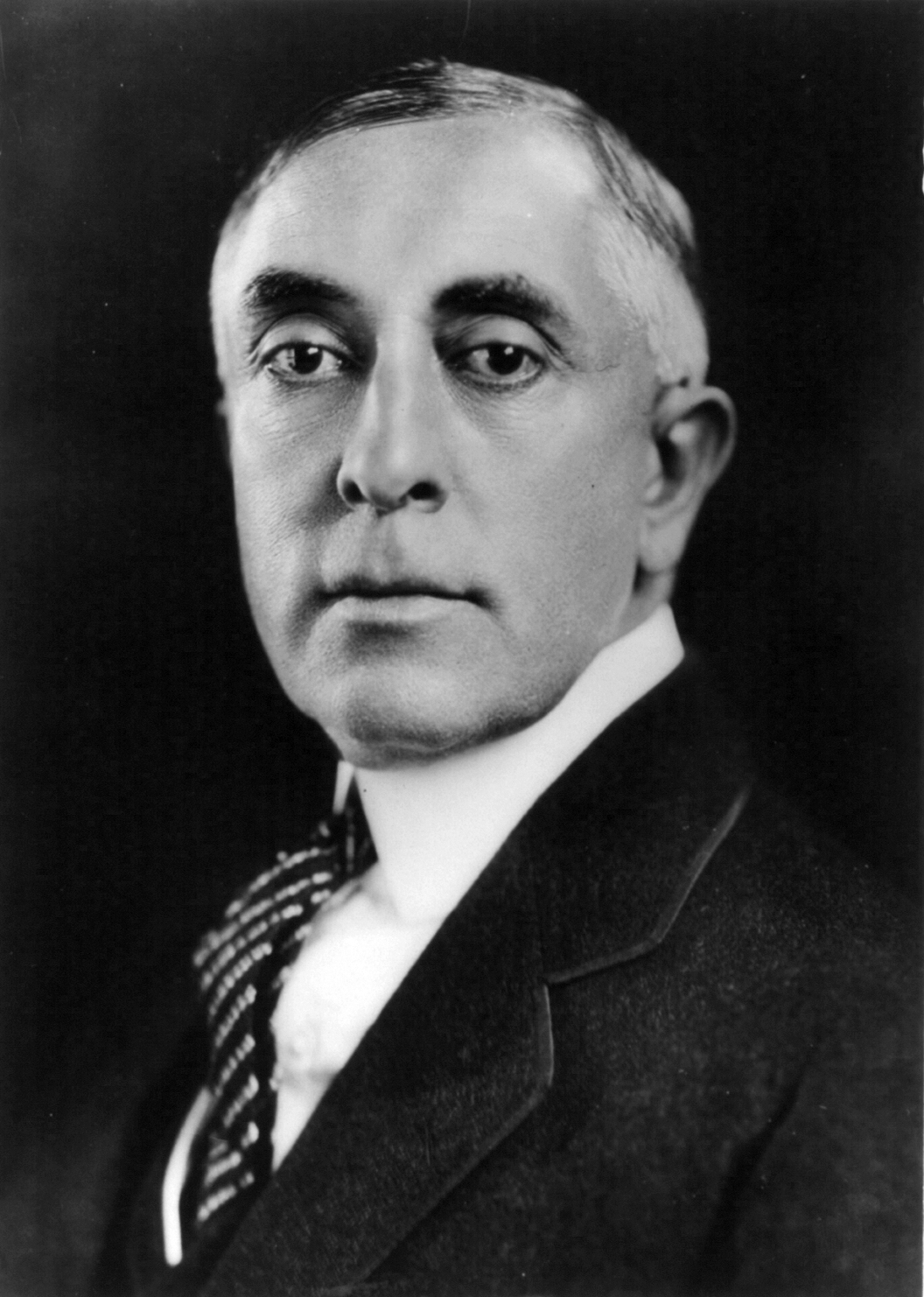
- C. Bascom Slemp in 1924

Secretary to the President
- In office September 4, 1923 – March 4, 1925
- President: Calvin Coolidge
- Preceded by: George B. Christian Jr.
- Succeeded by: Everett Sanders

Member of the U.S. House of Representatives from Virginia's 9th district
- In office December 17, 1907 – March 3, 1923
- Preceded by: Campbell Slemp
- Succeeded by: George C. Peery

Personal details
- Born: September 4, 1870 Turkey Cove, Virginia, U.S.
- Died: August 7, 1943 (aged 72) Knoxville, Tennessee, U.S.
- Resting place: Turkey Cove, Virginia, U.S.
- Party: Republican
- Parent: Campbell Slemp (father)

Campbell Bascom Slemp (September 4, 1870 – August 7, 1943) was an American Republican politician. He was a six-time United States congressman from Virginia's 9th congressional district from 1907 to 1923 and served as the presidential secretary to President Calvin Coolidge. As a philanthropist, Slemp set up the "Slemp Foundation", which provides gifts and scholarships to schools and colleges in Southwestern Virginia.

== Early and family life ==
Slemp was born on September 4, 1870, at Turkey Cove, Virginia, in Lee County to Colonel Campbell Slemp, who later became a United States Representative from the 9th district of Virginia (1903 to 1907). His mother was Nancy (Nannie) Britain Cawood of Harlan County, Kentucky. His father was an officer in the Confederate army during the American Civil War.

Slemp attended the Methodist-run "Seminary" in Turkey Cove, and had a private tutor (William Davidson of King College), and also at age 9 became a page in the Virginia House of Delegates after his father's election to the Virginia General Assembly in 1879. In 1887, the 16-year-old Slemp entered the Corps of Cadets at Virginia Military Institute in Lexington, Virginia. In 1891, Slemp graduated with the highest grade point average in the school's history — a record that stands today. He also received the Jackson Medal for Most Distinguished Student four years in a row.

Bascom Slemp then studied law for a year at the University of Virginia in Charlottesville and was admitted to the Virginia bar in 1901.

He briefly married Roberta Trousdale Barton in New Orleans, on December 26, 1911, but their daughter was stillborn the following year.

== Early career ==
Slemp served as Commandant of Cadets at the Marion Military Institute for one year, after which he was hired as the second principal of the Stonega Academy in Big Stone Gap (1893–1895). Slemp then taught at VMI as professor of mathematics for several years. In 1901, after Slemp was admitted to the Virginia bar, he resigned his position at the institute to set up a law practice in Big Stone Gap. Slemp became president of the Slemp Coal Company and of the Hamilton Realty Company, among other business interests.

== Political career ==
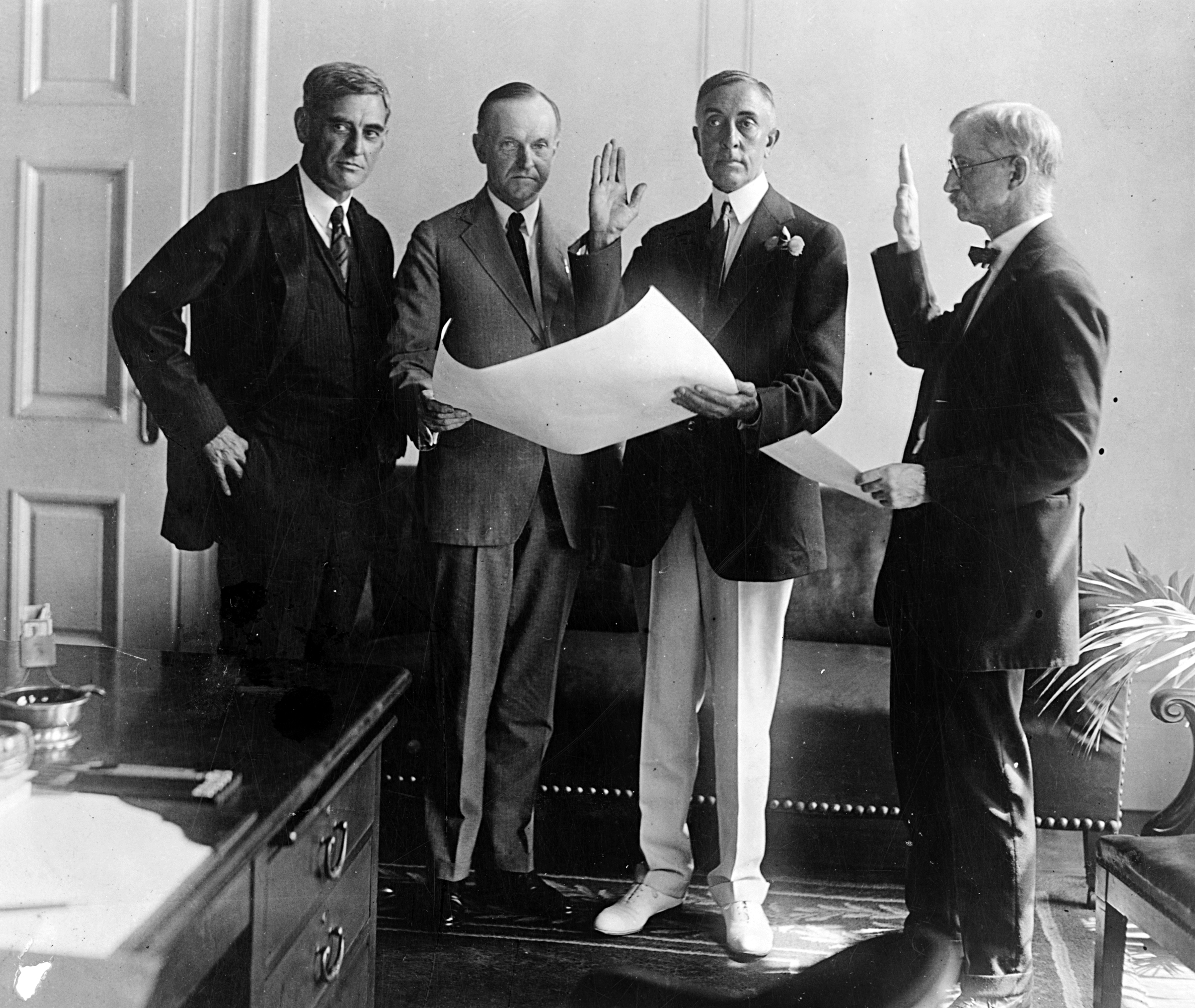
Slemp being sworn in as presidential secretary, 1923

Slemp's father served in the United States House of Representatives from Virginia's 9th congressional district from 1903 to his death in 1907. Slemp was elected to replace his father and served for fifteen years. He served as the chair of the Republican Party of Virginia's state committee from 1905 to 1918, and was its national committeeman from 1918 to 1932.

Bascom Slemp won the special election to fill his father's vacancy, and also won reelection six times, serving from 1907 until March 3, 1923, after he declined to be a candidate for re-election. As the leading Republican in the Old Dominion, he faced a difficult battle for re-election in 1910, after Democrats persuaded Henry C. Stuart to run against him, and used the slogan "Redeem the District." Theodore Roosevelt gave a speech for Slemp, who won by a margin of about 200 votes. Although Stuart initially refused to concede defeat, his contest failed, in part because all 265 precincts had a Democratic registrar, two Democratic clerks and at least two Democratic judges.

Slemp was a close advisor to President Warren G. Harding, especially on the issue of patronage in the South. President Calvin Coolidge appointed Slemp as his secretary on August 14, 1923.

The appointment of Slemp to this prominent position stirred anger among African Americans within the Republican party. Black newspapers of the time decried Slemp's leadership of the "lily white movement" to oust black leaders from Virginia's Republican party. During his time in Congress, Slemp was one of only a small handful of Republicans who voted against the Dyer Anti-Lynching bill of 1922. An article in the nationally syndicated Pittsburgh Courier reported that "The Associated Negro Press has been informed from a number of sources that Slemp is a member of the Ku Klux Klan and a strong sympathizer with that nefarious organization."

Slemp served until March 4, 1925. He resigned early in Coolidge's second term as a result of unresolved friction with the President, and he was succeeded by Everett Sanders.

== Return to rural life ==
After leaving the Coolidge administration, Slemp returned to his law practice in Big Stone Gap, Virginia, and Washington, D.C. In 1929, he purchased a now-historic house in Big Stone Gap from his friend Rufus A. Ayers. In 1930, President Herbert Hoover appointed Slemp as United States Commissioner General to the International Colonial and Overseas Exposition in Paris, and at its conclusion in 1931, France awarded Slemp the French Legion of Honor Medal. By the 1930 Census, Slemp lived in Big Stone Gap with his sister S. Janie and her husband John W. Newman and several servants. With Janie's help, Slemp established the Southwest Virginia Museum, and in 1946, after his death, the Commonwealth accepted many pieces bequeathed to it.

== Death and legacy ==
Slemp often maintained a local residence with siblings, and remained a prominent member of the southwest Virginia community and political scene until his death. He died at St. Mary's hospital in Knoxville, Tennessee, on August 7, 1943, aged 73.

The Slemp family remained active in political life throughout southwestern Virginia. Current Slemp family members elected to office include Lee County, Virginia Board of Supervisors member Charles Herbert Slemp, Jr. His son Charles Herbert "Chuck" Slemp, III served as Commonwealth's Attorney for Wise County and the City of Norton, Virginia and as Chief Deputy Attorney General of Virginia before joining the Richmond office of an international law firm.

The Slemp Foundation continues to touch many in southwestern Virginia, especially young lives. Established in his will, it provides gifts to libraries, schools and colleges in southwestern Virginia. The "Lonesome Pine Regional Library" (which serves Lee, Dickenson, and Wise Counties) has received support from the foundation, and its branch in Big Stone Gap is named in Slemp's honor. In 1948, his daughter and the Slemp Foundation donated his former home in Big Stone Gap to the Commonwealth of Virginia, which now operates it as the Southwest Virginia Museum Historical State Park. It hosts folk events and concerts throughout the year, as well as a wintertime Christmas tree exhibit highlighting local charities and crafts.

The Slemp Scholarship, named in honor of the late congressman, is awarded to outstanding college students who graduated from schools in Lee, Scott, and Wise counties, Virginia.

In October 2003, the long-planned C. Bascom Slemp Student Center was opened on the campus of the University of Virginia's College at Wise. This $10.9-million, 46,234-square-foot (4,295.3 m^{2}) structure was funded by student fees, as well from a $2.5 million allocation from the Slemp Foundation.

Slemp was a cousin three times removed of the American film star George C. Scott.

The United States Post Office and Courthouse at Big Stone Gap, Virginia, is named the C. Bascom Slemp Federal Building, although regularly scheduled court sessions there ceased during Massive Resistance. A historical marker in Seminary, Virginia, about 6 miles southwest of Big Stone Gap on Alt. Route 58, also honors three Congressmen born within a mile of the marker: Slemp (61st-67th Congresses), his father Campbell Slemp (58th through 60th Congresses) and Congressman James B. Richmond (46th Congress).

== Works cited ==
- Sherman, Richard (1973). The Republican Party and Black America From McKinley to Hoover 1896-1933. University of Virginia Press. ISBN 0813904676.

U.S. House of Representatives
| Preceded by Campbell Slemp | Member of the U.S. House of Representatives from Virginia's 9th congressional district December 17, 1907 – March 3, 1923 | Succeeded by George C. Peery |
