= Francis Blair =

Francis or Frank Blair may refer to:

- Francis Preston Blair Jr. (1821–1875), American politician and Union Army general
- Francis Preston Blair (1791–1876), his father, American journalist and politician
- Frank S. Blair (1839–1899), Virginia lawyer and Attorney General of Virginia
- Frank Blair (journalist) (1915–1995), American broadcast journalist and news anchor on NBC's Today program
- W. Frank Blair (1912–1984), American zoologist
