= Auburn Pridemore =

American politician

Auburn Lorenzo Pridemore
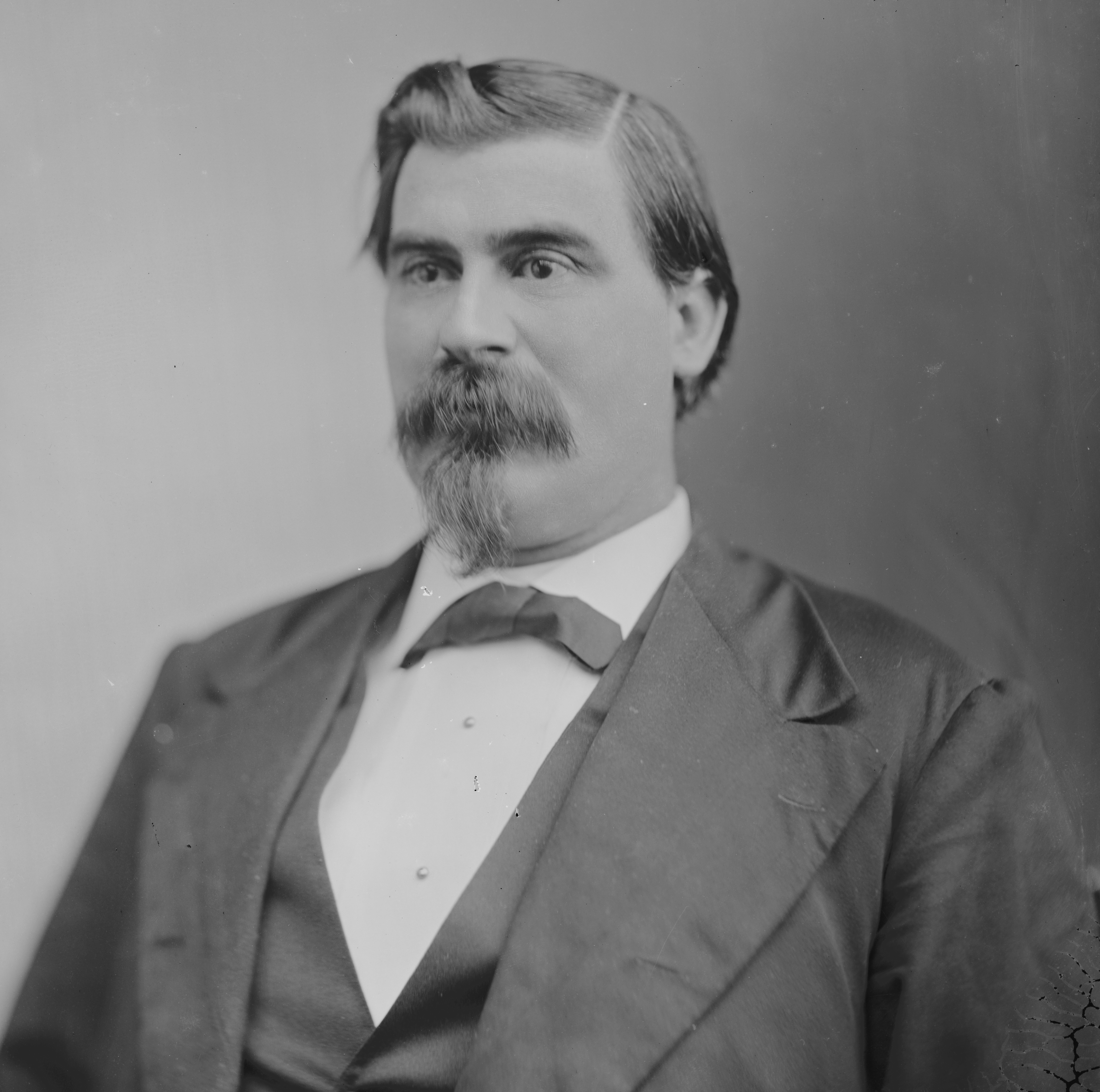

Member of the U.S. House of Representatives from Virginia's 9th district
- In office March 4, 1877 – March 3, 1879
- Preceded by: William Terry
- Succeeded by: James Richmond

Member of the Virginia Senate
- In office 1871 – 1875
- Preceded by: George H. Kendrick
- Succeeded by: Henry C. Slemp

Personal details
- Born: June 27, 1837 Scott County, Virginia, U.S.
- Died: May 17, 1900 (aged 62) Jonesville, Virginia, U.S.
- Party: Democratic
- Profession: Politician, Lawyer

Military service
- Allegiance: Virginia; Confederate States
- Branch/service: Virginia Militia; Confederate States Army
- Rank: Colonel (CSA)
- Commands: 21st Virginia Infantry Battalion; 64th Virginia Infantry
- Battles/wars: American Civil War: Battle of Middle Creek

Auburn Lorenzo Pridemore (June 27, 1837 – May 17, 1900) was a nineteenth-century Virginia lawyer who served in the Virginia Senate and in the United States House of Representatives representing Virginia's 9th congressional district.

== Early and family life ==
Born in Scott County, Virginia on June 27, 1837, to mountain farmer Daniel Pridemore and his wife Mary Ann Ingram, Pridemore had an older brother Hiram Demothensese Pridemore (1833–1892) and a sister Sarah Eleanor Pridemore (1842–1859). Despite his brother's classical name, he assisted on the family farm and received a limited education as a child.

He married Caladonia Justine Hill (daughter of a land agent in Jonesville) on February 24, 1869, but she died giving birth to their daughter Mary Ingram Pridemore Sewell (1869–1931). He lived with his in-laws, then married Lucy E. Crockett on June 27, 1875, who gave birth to Hiram Hagan Pridemore (1876–1926).

== Confederate military service ==
During the Civil War, Pridemore raised a company of volunteer infantry for the Pound Gap battalion of the Confederate Army and was commissioned as its captain on October 17, 1861. In June, 1862 he received a promotion to major. Following a reorganization after the Battle of the Cumberland Gap, his unit was reconstituted as Company S of the 64th Virginia Mounted Infantry under Colonel Campbell Slemp and Pridemore became a lieutenant colonel on December 14, 1862. He was promoted to full colonel on February 5, 1864, and commanded the 64th Virginia Cavalry until the end of the war.

== Political career ==
Elected to the Virginia House of Delegates in 1865, his Confederate record under Congressional Reconstruction prevented him from taking a seat. Pridemore studied law and was admitted to the bar in 1867. He began his legal practice in Jonesville, the Lee County seat.

Voters elected Pridemore to the Virginia Senate in 1871, and he served until 1875. He succeeded George H. Kendrick and was succeeded by his former subordinate CSA Captain Henry C. Slemp, who ran as a Readjuster. The district boundaries were changed from the 1871 session, with Pridemore's native Scott County removed and added to Russell County, where John H.A. Smith was elected.

Lee County voters again elected Pridemore, as a Democrat to the United States House of Representatives in 1876, where he replaced William Terry and he was re-elected once, serving from 1877 to 1879. He was defeated for re-election in 1878 and replaced by fellow ex-Confederate James Buchanan Richmond, his former subordinate. Afterwards, Pridemore continued his legal practice in Jonesville until his death there.

== Death and legacy ==
Pridemore was interred in Hill Cemetery in Jonesville.

Pridemore named the unincorporated community of Ben Hur, Virginia after the novel Ben-Hur: A Tale of the Christ by Lew Wallace.

== Referenced ==
- United States Congress. "Auburn Pridemore (id: P000535)". Biographical Directory of the United States Congress.

U.S. House of Representatives
Preceded by William Terry	Member of the U.S. House of Representatives from Virginia's 9th congressional district March 4, 1877 – March 3, 1879	Succeeded by James Richmond
