= Ben Hur, Virginia =

Unincorporated community in Lee County, Virginia

Coordinates: 36°43′58″N 83°04′56″W

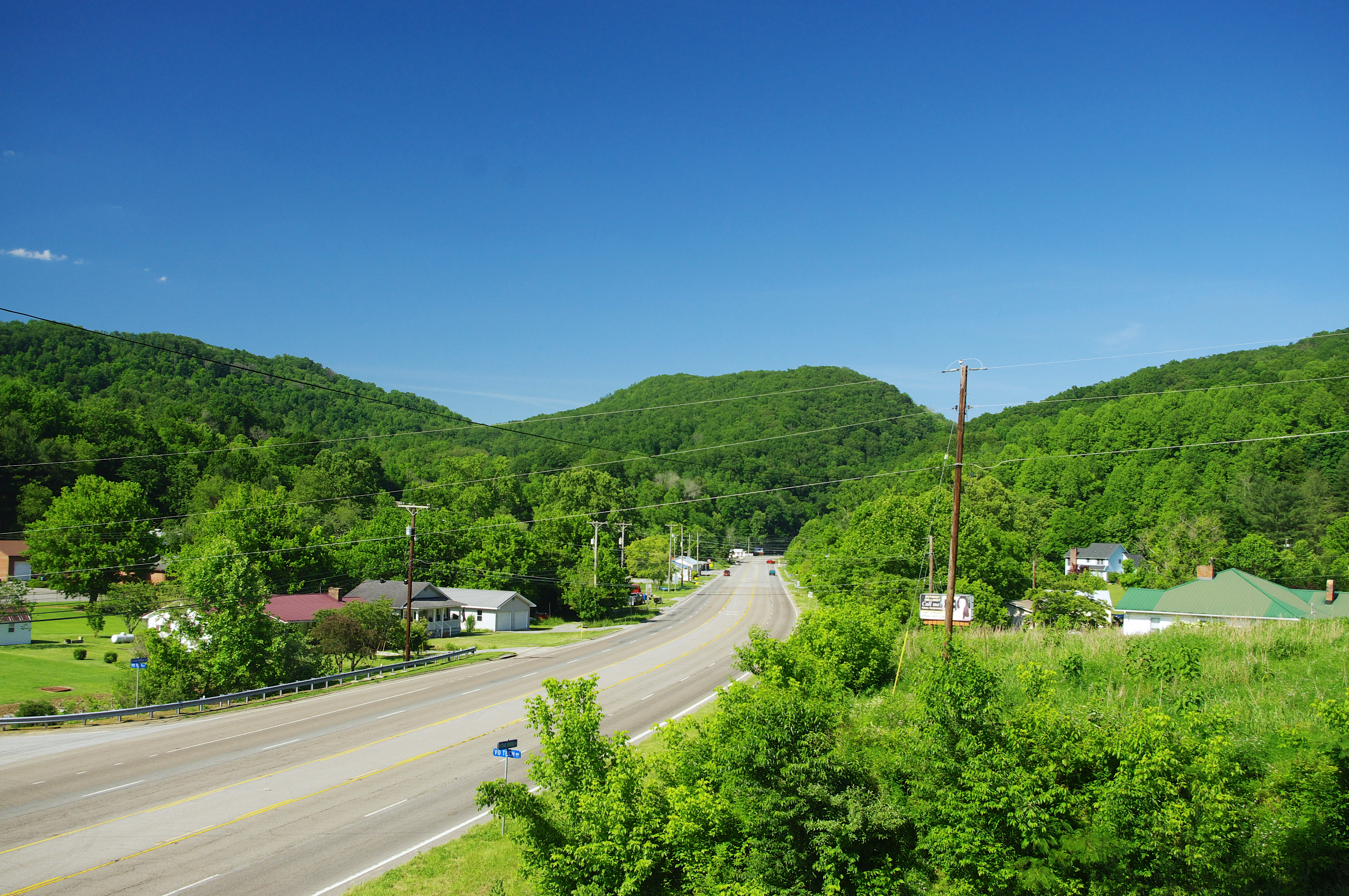
US 58 Alt. in Ben Hur

Ben Hur is an unincorporated community in Lee County, Virginia, United States. It is located along U.S. Route 58 Alternate, southwest of Pennington Gap and northeast of Jonesville.

It is the location of Lee High School and Lee County's Walmart store.

== History ==
Ben Hur was founded by Auburn Pridemore. He named the community after the novel Ben-Hur: A Tale of the Christ by Lew Wallace.

The Ben Hur post office was established in 1921. The ZIP Code for Ben Hur is 24218.
