= 1892 Populist National Convention =

- 1892 presidential election
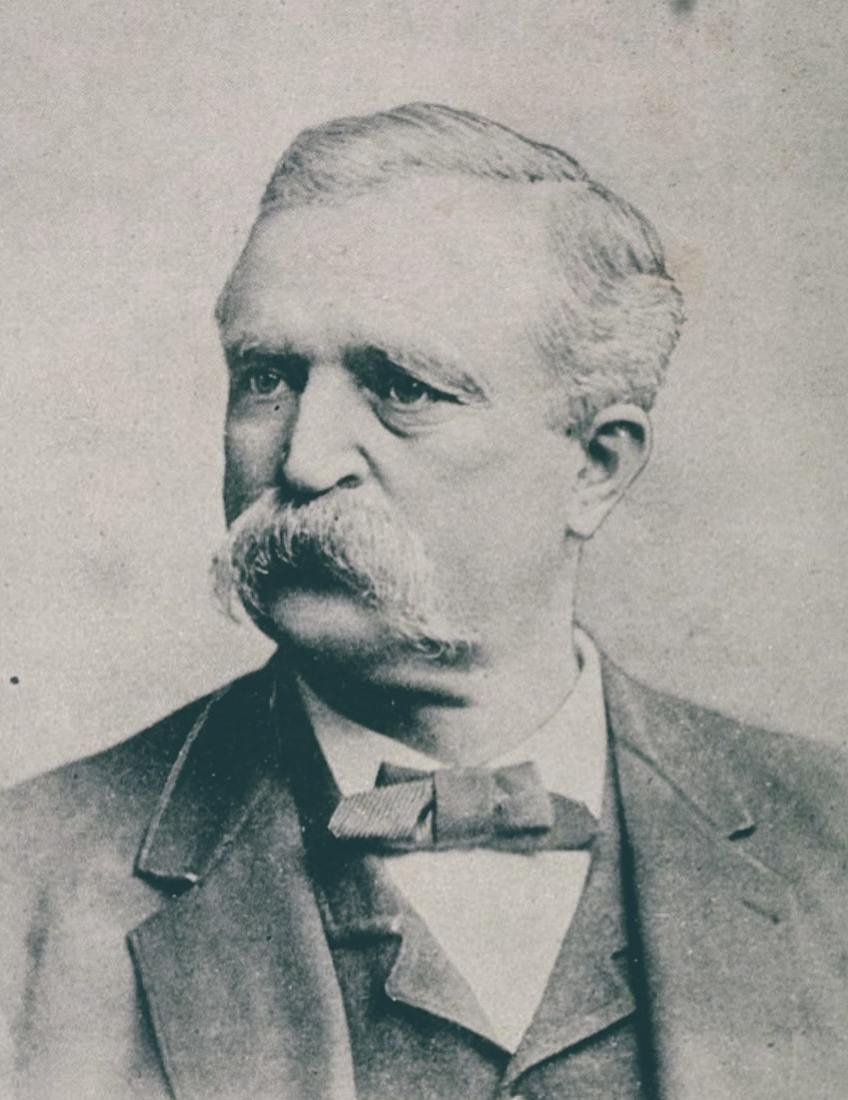
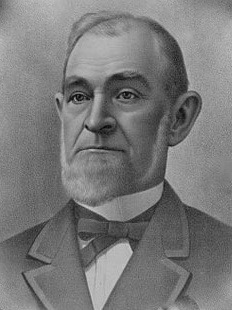
- Nominees (Weaver & Field)

Convention
- City: Omaha, Nebraska
- Venue: Omaha Coliseum
- Keynote speaker: Marion Butler of North Carolina

Candidates
- Presidential nominee: James B. Weaver of Iowa
- Vice-presidential nominee: James G. Field of Virginia
- Ballots: 1

1892 Populist National Convention was held in July 2–4, 1892, at the Omaha Coliseum in Omaha, Nebraska. The first national convention of the short-lived Populist Party (formally known as the "People's Party"), the convention ratified the Omaha Platform. A presidential nominating convention for the 1892 presidential election, it nominated James B. Weaver for president and James G. Field for vice president.

== Background ==
The convention followed two "industrial conferences" held to establish the party, one which was held in Cincinnati in May 1881 and one which was held in St. Louis in February 1892. The national convention was a presidential nominating convention at which the party also adopted its first policy platform.

The Populist Party, formally known as the "People's Party", was regarded to be a serious third party.

== Logistics ==
The convention met July 2–July 4, 1892, at the Omaha Coliseum. More than 1,300 delegates attending the convention.

At the time the convention was regarded as a major event to have been held in the city of Omaha. It remains the only major presidential nominating convention to be held in the state of Nebraska. Omaha was chosen as a location, in part, because it was considered to be near the geographical center of United States. Considered a historically significant event for Omaha, a historical reenactment was organized in 1992 by the Douglas County Historical Society to commemorate the centennial of the convention.

== Platform ==
On July 4, convention adopted the "Omaha Platform", which the party hailed as a "second Declaration of Independence". The platform's preamble had been drafted by Ignatius Donnelly in advance of the convention, and denounced politics in the United States as having been corrupted by corporations, banks, and trusts to such a degree that government policy had now created, "the two great classes – tramps and millionaires". The platform outlined numerous progressive policy reforms that the party would demand.

== Presidential nomination ==
Heading into the convention, many were speculated as possible presidential contenders. This included Weaver, Leonidas L. Polk, James G. Field, James H. Kyle, Ben Terrell, Alva Adams, Edward Bellamy, Robert Beverly, Marion Cannon, Ignatius L. Donnelly, Walter Q. Gresham, C. W. Macune, Mann Page, Terence V. Powderly, Leland Stanford, William M. Stewart, Alson Streeter, Thomas E. Watson, and Charles Van Wyck were speculated as possible presidential candidates.

Polk was initially regarded to be the front-runner for the nomination. He had been instrumental in the party's formation and greatly appealed to its agrarian base. However, Polk unexpectedly died in Washington, D.C., on June 11. After this, Gresham rose as a contender. An appellate judge, Gresham had made a number of rulings against the railroads that made him a favorite of some farmer and labor groups, and it was felt that his rather dignified image would make the Populists appear as more than minor contenders. He had been considered for the Republican presidential nomination in 1884 and 1888. Both Democrats and Republicans feared his nomination for this reason, and while Gresham toyed with the idea of seeking the Populist nomination, he ultimately was not ready to make a complete break with the two major parties. Thus, both in advance of and during the Populist Convention, Gresham declined efforts to draft his candidacy. Gresham later endorsed Democratic nominee Grover Cleveland for president in the general election.

The convention ultimately nominated James B. Weaver of Iowa for president. Weaver was a founder of the Populist Party.

=== Presidential balloting ===
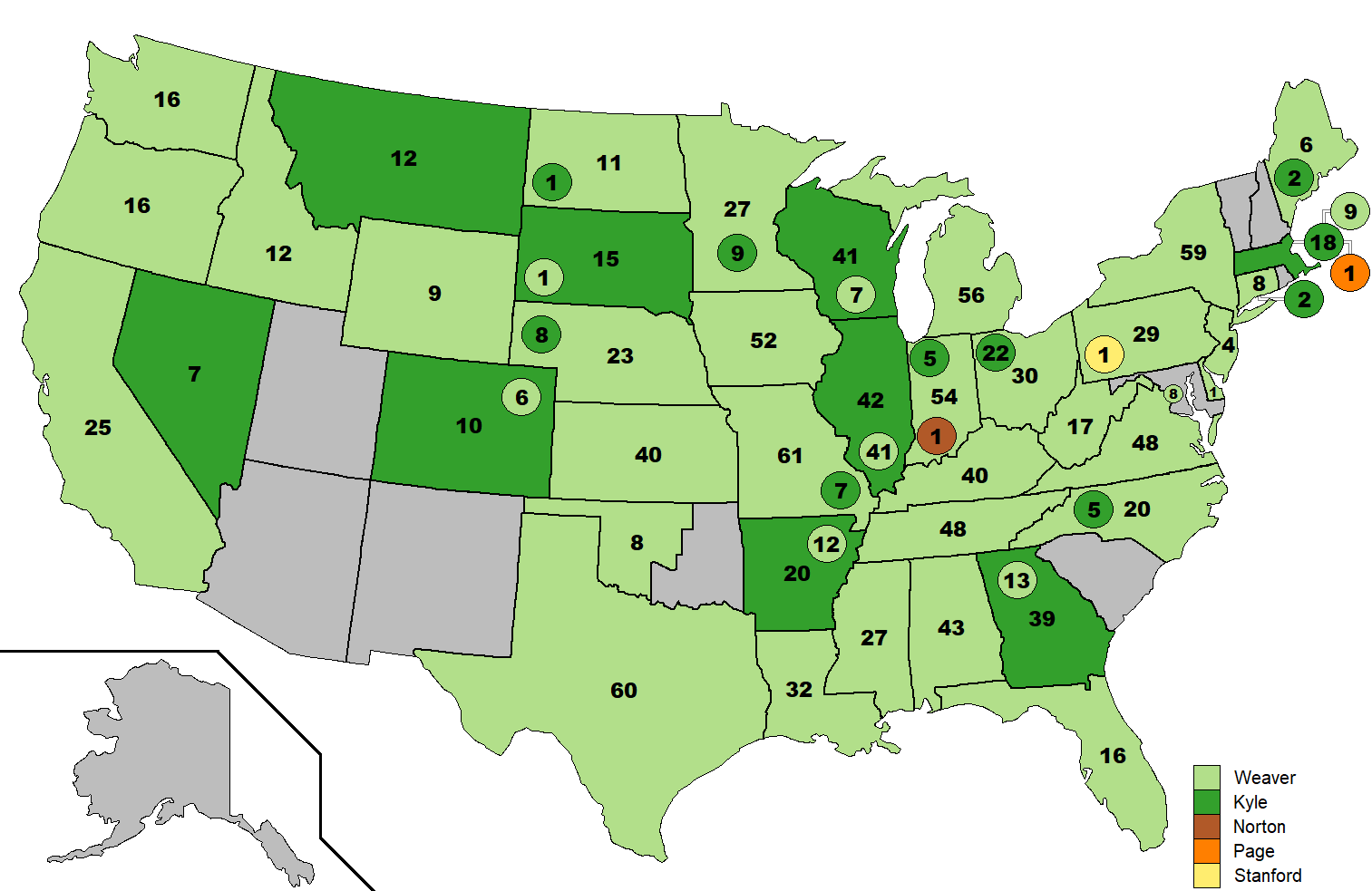
Presidential balloting by state

Weaver had his name placed into contention as a candidate for nomination by a young member of the Alabama delegation, which (by virtue of the alphabet) was the first state called in the nomination roll call. When the Illinois delegation had its turn in the roll call, S. F. Norton of Chicago placed the name of U.S. Senator James H. Kyle of South Dakota. Several others were also nominated, including Charles Van Wick of Nebraska. It became clear before the first ballot was half-over that Weaver would have enough support to secure the nomination. A motion was passed after the first ballot to make his nomination unanimous.

Presidential ballot
Candidate	Votes
James B. Weaver	995
James H. Kyle	265
Seymour F. Norton	1
Mann Page	1
Leland Stanford	1

=== Vice presidential nomination ===
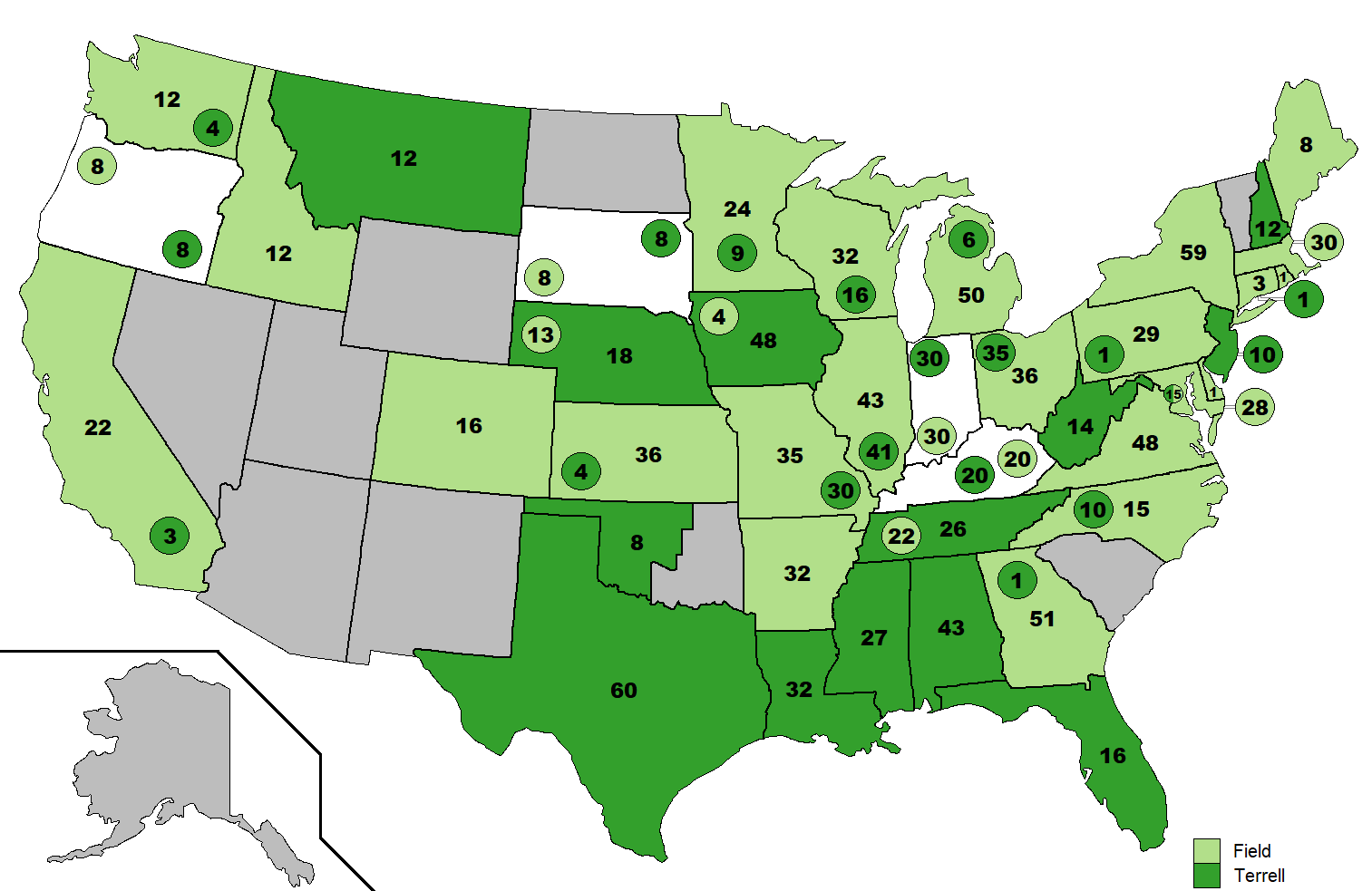
Vice presidential balloting by state

The names of James G. Field of Virginia and Ben Terrell of Texas were placed as candidates for the nominating vote for vice president. Field was nominated on the first ballot. Field had formerly served as attorney general of Virginia, and was a Confederate military veteran.

After the vice presidential nomination, the convention adjourned sine die at 3 AM local time, the convention's July 4 evening session having spanned into the early hours of the next day.

Vice presidential ballot
Candidate	Votes
James G. Field	733
Ben Stockton Terrell	554

== Key participants at convention ==
Among the key participants in the convention was Donnelly, whose platform preamble attracted a large ovation and led him to be dubbed "the greatest orator of Populist". Another was Mary Elizabeth Lease, who was credited with originating the catch phrase that farmers "should raise less corn and more hell".

The convention's keynote address was delivered by Marion Butler, at the time a member of the North Carolina Senate.
