= Statue of Thomas E. Watson =

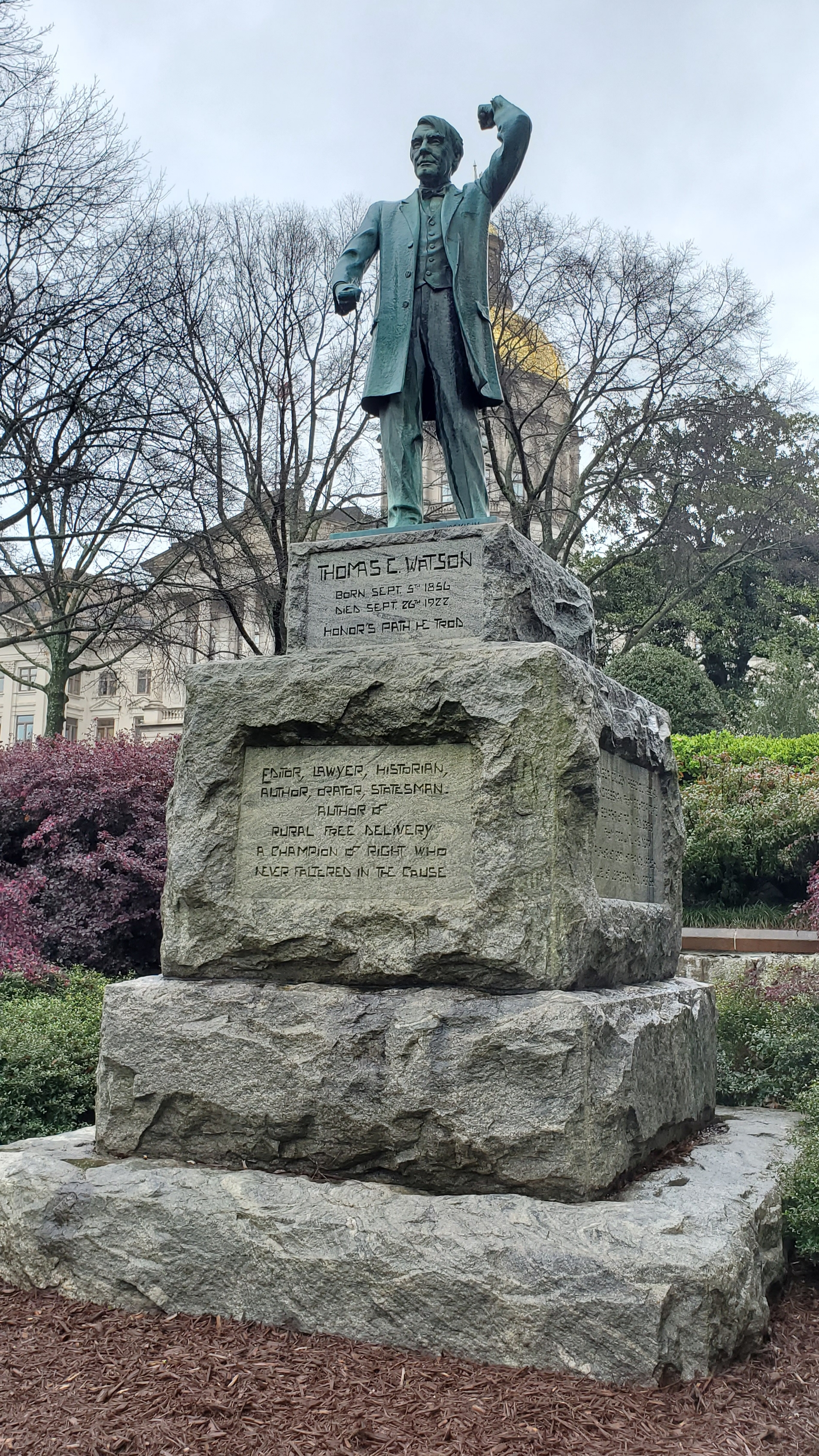
- The statue in 2020
- Location: Talmadge Plaza, Atlanta, Georgia; 33°44′58″N 84°23′22″W
- Designer: Joseph Klein
- Height: 12 feet (3.7 m)
- Dedicated date: December 4, 1932
- Dedicated to: Thomas E. Watson

The statue of Thomas E. Watson is a public monument located near the Georgia State Capitol in Atlanta, Georgia. Dedicated in 1932, the statue honors Georgian politician Thomas E. Watson, who served terms in the United States Congress as both a representative and senator in the late 1800s and early 1900s. Originally located on the steps of the capitol building, the statue was removed from this location in 2013 and relocated to a nearby plaza.

== History ==
Thomas E. Watson was a Georgian politician. Born September 5, 1856, he initially rose to prominence as an advocate against lynching and a proponent for expanding suffrage to African Americans. Early in his political career, he served in the Georgia General Assembly and as a U.S. Representative from Georgia. In the 1908 United States presidential election, he ran as a candidate for the People's Party, by which time he had changed his positions and had become an ardent supporter of white supremacy and espoused antisemitic and anti-Catholic sentiment. His antisemitic writings contributed to public sentiment that lead to the lynching of Leo Frank in 1915. He was later elected to the United States Senate in 1920, but died shortly into his term on September 26, 1922.

On August 21, 1925, the Georgia General Assembly passed a resolution calling for the erection of a monument honoring Watson on the grounds of the Georgia State Capitol. The monument was designed by Joseph Klein, an Atlanta-based sculptor, and dedicated on December 4, 1932. The statue was originally located on the steps on the west side of the building.

In October 2013, Georgia Governor Nathan Deal issued a state executive order ordering the statue to be removed from its position and relocated to a plaza near the capitol. This move came during a major renovation project on the building's west steps, with the decision to permanently relocate the statue rather than temporarily removing it expected to save between $50,000 and $60,000. The statue was removed from the capitol steps on November 29. The move was supported by the Anti-Defamation League and civil rights leaders, while criticized by the Sons of Confederate Veterans as "an attempt to rewrite or cover up ... history." Former Georgia Governor Roy Barnes voiced his support for the removal, saying he wished he had done the same during his governorship, but that "I just never got around to it. I regret I didn't."

== See also ==
- 1932 in art
