= James G. Field =

American politician

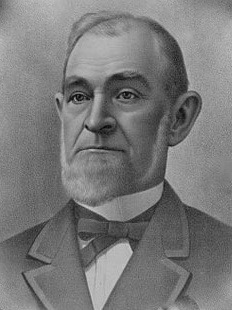

Attorney General of Virginia
- In office August 29, 1877 – January 1, 1882
- Governor: James L. Kemper; Frederick W. M. Holliday
- Preceded by: Raleigh Daniel
- Succeeded by: Frank S. Blair

Personal details
- Born: James Gaven Field; February 24, 1826 Walnut, Virginia, U.S.
- Died: October 12, 1901 (aged 75) Gordonsville, Virginia, U.S.
- Party: Democratic
- Other party: Populist; Conservative
- Spouse(s): Frances E. Cowherd; Elizabeth R. Logwood
- Children: 5
- Parents: Lewis Yancy Field (father); Maria Duncan (mother)
- Relatives: John Field
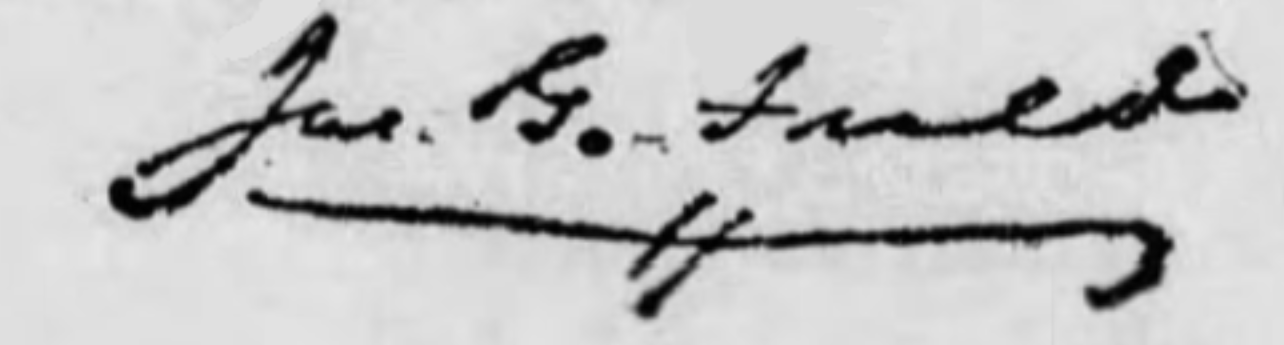
- Signature

Military service
- Allegiance: Confederate States of America
- Branch/service: Confederate States Army
- Years of service: 1861-1865
- Rank: Major
- Unit: 13th Virginia Infantry
- Battles/wars: American Civil War: First Battle of Manassas; Jackson's Valley campaign; Battle of Gaines' Mill; Battle of Cedar Mountain

James Gaven Field (February 24, 1826 – October 12, 1901) was an American politician in California and Virginia, who was also a businessman, government clerk, and Confederate major. He became the Attorney General of Virginia and the vice presidential nominee of the Populist Party during the 1892 presidential election.

== Early and family life ==
James Gaven Field was born in Walnut, Culpeper County, Virginia to Judge Lewis Yancy Field and Maria Duncan. After attending a private classical school, he became a merchant in the former lands of Lord Fairfax and taught school.

On June 20, 1854, he married Frances E. Cowherd, two years his junior and they remained married until her death in April 1877. They had at least four children: William Field, Mard Field, James G. Field Jr and Maxy Field On February 2, 1882, married Elizabeth R. Logwood.

== Career ==
In 1848 Field accompanied Major Hill, a paymaster for the U.S. Army, to California as clerk. In addition to his federal government job, he became the secretary of the convention that framed the first constitution of the state of California in 1850.

In October 1850 Field returned to Virginia, where he studied law with his uncle, Judge Richard H. Field, and was admitted to the bar in 1852. In 1859 he was elected commonwealth attorney (prosecutor) for Culpeper County. In the 1860 federal census, Field owned six enslaved people—a 70 year old black man, 18 year old Black woman, two 12-year-old girls and two boys aged 9 and 14 years old.

On April 17, 1861, Field resigned as commonwealth attorney and volunteered with Culpeper county's minute men. He enlisted as a private and became an officer of Virginia's 13th Infantry. He fought in the Valley Campaign of 1862. Promoted to the rank of major on March 23, 1862, Field served on the staff of General A. P. Hill. At the Battle of Gaines' Mill he was wounded and later lost a leg at the Battle of Cedar Mountain on August 9, 1862. After recovering from that wound in May 1863, Field continued his Confederate service as paymaster until April 9, 1865.

Following the Civil War he joined the Conservative Party. He became Attorney General of Virginia in 1877. In 1879 Field argued Ex Parte Virginia before the U.S. Supreme Court, however he failed to convince the justices that Congress lacked authority to require blacks on trial juries.

Field retired to a farm in Albemarle County, Virginia, but remained active in politics.

During the 1892 presidential election he was nominated at the 1892 Populist National Convention as the People's Party vice presidential candidate on the first ballot on July 5 alongside James B. Weaver as the presidential nominee. Field campaigned in the southern and border states and in support of the party's radical reform platform. At a mid-July speech in Gordonsville, in Orange County, he compared the revolutionary impulse of Populism with the American Revolution of 1776 and advised his audience to "Read your Bibles Sunday and the Omaha platform every day in the week." The ticket won five states and received over one million votes. In 1893 he advocated for the impeachment of President Grover Cleveland and later supported William Jennings Bryan in 1896 and 1900.

== Death and legacy ==
Field died in Gordonsville, Virginia, either on May 18, 1902 or October 12, 1901. He is buried in the Culpeper city cemetery.

Legal offices
Preceded by Raleigh Daniel	Attorney General of Virginia; 1877–1882	Succeeded by Frank S. Blair
Party political offices
New political party	Populist nominee for President of the United States; Endorsed; 1892	Succeeded by Thomas E. Watson
