= George H. Kendrick =

American state legislator

George H. Kendrick was a state legislator in Virginia and represented several counties in the Virginia Senate. He served from 1869–1871 and was succeeded by Auburn L. Pridemore. He served in the Virginia House of Representatives from Scott County, along with Z. W. Davidson, from 1865–1867.

In 1869 he petitioned for the removal of political disabilities. He lived in Scott County, Virginia. He served on the Committee on Banks.
