= Lynching of Leonard Woods =

1927 lynching of a Black man in Kentucky

Coordinates: 37°09′17″N 82°37′58″W

Leonard Woods was an African-American man who was lynched by a mob in Pound Gap, on the border between Kentucky and Virginia, after they broke him out of jail in Whitesburg, Kentucky, on November 30, 1927. Woods was alleged to have killed the foreman of a mine, Herschel Deaton. A mob of people from Kentucky and Virginia took him from the jail and away from town and hanged him, and riddled his body with shots. The killing, which became widely publicized, was the last in a long line of extrajudicial murders in the area, and, prompted by the activism of Louis Isaac Jaffe and others, resulted in the adoption of strong anti-lynching legislation in Virginia.

As happens frequently with lynchings, accounts printed by white newspapers differed considerably from those found in Black newspapers. The white papers had Woods (and two young Black women) essentially jumping onto a car (driven by Deaton, who was accompanied by two friends) and then shooting Deaton, a young Virginia man from a well-to-do family who was a foreman in a Kentucky mine. The narrative in the Black papers, prompted by a report written for the NAACP, provided background information that suggested that the two Black women involved may have been prostitutes involved with Deaton and his two companions, and that Woods had some kind of relationship with one or both of the women. The lynching, then, would have served to avert a trial in which Woods's testimony might have harmed the reputation of Deaton, his friends, and his family.

== Background ==
Leonard Woods was a 30-year-old Black miner who lived in Jenkins, Kentucky. Jenkins was a new company town in Letcher County, built to accommodate the workers of the Consolidation Coal Company, or Consol, which was opening mines on the Cumberland Plateau in Eastern Kentucky, and had managed to get the Baltimore and Ohio Railroad to extend its line to serve its needs. Letcher County's demographics changed considerably when Consol opened up business; the coal mines attracted a large number of poor whites from all over the American South, and in addition the Black railroad workers, who built the line to Jenkins, came to work for the mines as well. The company recruited among the Black population of the South as well, and newcomers to the country, from Eastern and Southern Europe, arrived in Jenkins as well.

As Alexander Leidholdt notes, these developments gave rise to demographic and other tension. Inside the booming mining town, wages were decent but everything, including housing, food, religion, and social life was controlled by the mining company, and the population was a mix of whites, Blacks, and recent immigrants (the number of Black Kentuckians statewide had dropped, while in Jenkins it rose), while the county itself (like the surrounding counties) consisted mostly of poor white folk, living in a relatively lawless world of high crime fueled by moonshine, turf wars over stills, and guns. ("Moonshine wars" costs 16 Letcher County deputies their lives in a four-year period.) By 1927, however, the coal boom seemed to be ending, and recent "rainstorms of biblical proportions" had made many workers in the region lose their jobs; the county was "fraught with disruption and social change".

== Events leading up to the lynching ==
As is frequent with lynchings, there is more than one narrative, with the "white" newspaper(s) focusing on a select set of events, and the "Black" sources (aided in this case by the more progressive newspaper Crawford's Weekly, edited by Bruce Crawford, a leftist journalist and writer from Norton, Virginia) providing a different account of what led up to the confrontation that preceded the lynching. The narrative published by most of the white papers featured six people: Leonard Woods, his two Black female companions, Susan Armister and Anna May Emory; on the other side, there was Herschel Deaton, a young and popular mining foreman from a well-to-do Virginia family, and his two white friends Bill Townsend and Ernest Jordan. Deaton and his two friends are driving back to work from Coeburn, Virginia, on Sunday night, November 30, 1927. They are flagged down by Woods, Armister, and Emory, who insist on a ride; the women climb on the back of the coupe and Woods gets on the running board. Deaton then gets out to remove them, and Woods shoots him in the gut with a revolver given to him by one of the women, and threatens Townsend. The two men drive their friend Deaton to the hospital but it is too late and he dies before they get there. In the ensuing hunt, one of the women is captured; she confesses and gives up the names of the others. They are all arrested, but are quickly moved, under the threat of unrest, from the jail in Jenkins to the slightly stronger one in Whitesburg.

There may, however, have been a lot more to the story, and more details were published in weeks after. Bruce Crawford's detailed story ended with a puzzling and unexplained note, which said that there were rumors that there was much more to the story. And in following weeks, a local Black schoolteacher, Laurence Kellis, wrote an account of the events for the NAACP, urging them to send an investigator. He supplied other details: Armister and Emory were "intimate" with Deaton and a friend of his, and were going out for a ride that Sunday evening. Woods, who may have been more than just a friend to the women, did not want them to go on a joy ride, and jumped on the running board to get the women out of the car. A struggle ensues and Deaton beats Woods, who grabs a revolver and shoots him. What all this suggests, according to Alexander Leidholdt, is that the "inciting incident started in a brothel and involved two prostituted women and possibly their procurer".

== The lynching ==
Tensions ran high after the burial ceremony for Deaton in Virginia, and friends and acquaintances of Deaton from Virginia coordinated with people in Kentucky to get Woods from the prison in Whitesburg. On Tuesday evening a convoy of 36 cars brought Virginians into Kentucky, using the Pound Gap Highway (US Route 23). That highway had just been officially opened, and a wooden structure still stood from the opening festivities; the Virginians waited in Fleming, Kentucky, for the Kentucky contingent to join them after they broke Woods out of jail. Meanwhile, in Whitesburg, the jailer, knowing that the mob was coming (as did everybody else, it seems), took her own family away from the jail, right before a long procession of cars came into town; one newspaper said that a few hundred vigilantes had entered town earlier that day by train. Hundreds of people surrounded the jail, and the sheriff, Morgan T. Reynolds, did little more than ask them "to let the law take its course", before mingling with the crowd—afterwards he said he was unable to recognize anyone in that crowd.

The mob then broke into the jail using "axes, railroad ties, and crowbars", after climbing the barricades and using ladders to get to the roof. Woods was taken out, as well as Armister and Emory; there are varying accounts of what happened next. Crawford's Weekly said that Woods pleaded with the mob to let the two women go, and that the mob acceded; another paper said the women were beaten and then returned to their cells; and two other papers had the mob simply leave the women alone so they could climb back into their cells. Woods was put in a car and taken way in a huge caravan, which included cars full of locals looking for excitement.

The Whitesburg caravan met up with the Virginians in Fleming, intending to kill Woods at the site where Deaton had been shot, but they were prevented by the police chief, who asked them to go elsewhere and not cause a ruckus on the grounds of the coal company, which feared unrest among the diverse groups of workers that lived there. The crowd gave in and proceeded toward Pound Gap. They got there at 3 am; the crowd numbered 1,000 to 1,500 people, in some 500 cars. Using the platform, where a week and a half earlier Virginia's former governor Elbert Lee Trinkle and a congressman from Kentucky had cut the ribbon to open US 23, Woods was forced to make a final confession, and then was hanged with a rope. Someone shot him in the head, and the armed mob fired hundreds of bullets at Woods. He was then cut down, and after a woman in the crowd brought a can of gasoline, his body was burned. When the sun came up, more people came and collected souvenirs, including bullets plucked from the body. The authorities buried him at the site later that day, but hours later some Black men came from the Kentucky side and dug up the coffin, and buried it elsewhere.

Leidholdt notes that the events were very well orchestrated; the new highway and modern means of communication that enabled the murder to go so smoothly formed a stark contrast to the traditional values of the violent Cumberland community, which were in this instance confirmed, rather than threatened, by modernity. The lynching allowed the white population to exert its supposed moral superiority and its physical strength in a well-organized "sensational and theatrical spectacle". But here also the account by Laurence Kellis sheds light on otherwise puzzling events. Why the two women were saved is hinted at in the observation in Kellis's document that one of the two friends who were with Deaton when he was shot (and most likely it was Townsend) asked, after the jail was broken into, that "his woman" not be harmed. As for the first shot that was fired at Woods, rumor had it that it was Deaton's father who shot and killed Woods. All this suggests that the lynching might well have been a carefully engineered plan to prevent a murder trial for Woods to take place, a trial in which Deaton, his father and his influential family, and the two friends might be disgraced.

== Aftereffects ==
The NAACP, though called on to investigate, declined to do much with the case; Leidholdt thinks the case's salacious aspects may have played a role in that decision. Walter Francis White had just left the NAACP for a year, and then-secretary James Weldon Johnson, who had asked Kellis to write up the report in the first place, may have chosen to focus his energy on Black victims with untainted reputations. He did, however, use the size and violent nature of the mob, as well as the fact that this was an "interstate" event (which might prompt the federal government to intervene), in his many letters to newspaper editors, and sent a telegram to president Calvin Coolidge, whose Department of Justice, however, said it lacked jurisdiction. And while Coolidge, in an attempt to push through federal anti-lynching legislation, made reference to what he thought of as an upsurge in lynchings that year, no such legislation was passed.

Two Black-owned newspapers (the Richmond Planet and the Norfolk Journal and Guide) from Virginia reported on the story, and so did Baltimore Afro-American, whose editor, Carl Murphy, had gotten a copy of the Kellis report from Johnson and played up its author's proposed reasons for the killing of Deaton. Other Black papers followed up on that version of the story, presenting Woods in a positive light. Crawford, meanwhile, had published not only the initial article and a scathing editorial, but had also started a fund for a reward for whoever could name the killers, and he published a list of villages and towns where members of the mob had come from, with the added regrets that the names of the attendees were not known.

The legal system's first response was to argue over who had jurisdiction, Kentucky or Virginia, each side denying that they were the one who should pursue the matter. But by January 1928, Virginia governor Harry F. Byrd, pressed also by Louis Isaac Jaffe, was amenable to discussing anti-lynching legislation, and by February that legislation was signed into law. Certainly Crawford thought he was partly responsible for it. In the meantime a grand jury was convened in Whitesburg, on January 16, 1928, with charges including murder, rape, and carrying concealed weapons, and the judge instructed the jury to ponder the gravity of the matter as a serious violation of the law. (On that same day Byrd was pushing for his anti-lynching bill, telling the legislature "mob law is anarchy".) The grand jury, after hearing a hundred witnesses, came back saying there wasn't enough evidence to support an indictment, and that no positive identifications of guilty parties had been made. Neither Sheriff Reynolds nor Jenkins Police Chief Privitt had managed to write down a single license plate number from the hundreds of cars involved in the murder.

== Legacy ==
In the spring of 2021, a historical marker was to be placed at the site of the lynching, prompted by The Historical Society of the Pound and the Community Remembrance Project of Wise County, as well as Tabitha Smith and Thomas Costa of University of Virginia's College at Wise and the Equal Justice Initiative. The marker reads:

Leonard Woods Lynched — Leonard Woods, a black coal miner from Jenkins, Kentucky, was lynched near here on the night of 29-30 Nov. 1927. Officers had arrested Woods for allegedly killing Herschel Deaton, a white man from Coeburn, Virginia, and had taken him to the Whitesburg, Kentucky, jail. On the day of Deaton's funeral, a white mob numbering in the hundreds broke into the jail and brought Woods close to this spot, where they hanged, shot and burned him. No one was ever arrested. In the aftermath, at the urging of Norfolk editor Louis Jaffé, Norton's Bruce Crawford, and other journalists, Virginia Gov. Harry F. Byrd worked with the General Assembly early in 1928 to pass the nation's first law defining lynching as a state crime.
