= 64th =

64th is the ordinal form of the number 64. 64th or Sixty-fourth may also refer to:

- A fraction, 1/64, equal to one of 64 equal parts
- Sixty-fourth note, in music

== Geography ==
- 64th meridian east, a line of longitude
- 64th meridian west, a line of longitude
- 64th parallel north, a circle of latitude
- 64th parallel south, a circle of latitude
- 64th Street

== Military ==
- 64th Group Army, military formation of China's People's Liberation Army
- 64th Army (Soviet Union)
- 64th Division (disambiguation)
- 64th Regiment (disambiguation)
- 64th Squadron (disambiguation)

== Other ==
- 64th century
- 64th century BC

== See also ==
- 64 (disambiguation)
