= 64 =

64 or sixty-four may refer to:

- 64 (number), the natural number following 63 and preceding 65

== Dates ==
- one of the years 64 BC, AD 64, 1964, 2064

== Places ==
- Highway 64, see list of highways numbered 64
  - Interstate 64, a national route in the United States
- The code for international direct dial calls to New Zealand (+64)

== Music ==
- "64" (song), a 2011 song by hip hop band Odd Future
- Sixty Four (album), a 2004 album recorded in 1964 by Donovan
- "64" is the title of a song by the hip-hop group Mellowhype from their album BlackenedWhite

== Science ==
- The atomic number of gadolinium, a lanthanide
- 64 Angelina (asteroid 64), a main-belt asteroid

== Technology ==
- Base64 encoding
- Commodore 64 (in 8-bit home computers, a common shorthand is 64)
- A /64 Classless Inter-Domain Routing block

== Other ==
- Nintendo 64, a 1996 video game console
- 64, a Russian chess magazine
- Sixty-four (ship), a type of sailing warship
- Crayola 64 pack
- 64 Zoo Lane, a British animated children's TV series
- Porsche 64, a race car derived from the Volkswagen Beetle
- The international calling code for New Zealand
- A number used to represent the Tiananmen Square protests and massacre.

== See also ==
- 64th (disambiguation)
- 64DD, Nintendo 64 video game accessory
