= William F. Rhea =

American politician

William Francis Rhea
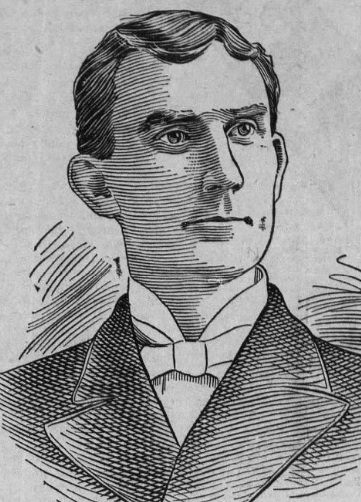
- Clinch Valley News, 31 October 1902

Member of the U.S. House of Representatives from Virginia's 9th district
- In office March 4, 1899 – March 3, 1903
- Preceded by: James A. Walker
- Succeeded by: Campbell Slemp

Personal details
- Born: April 20, 1858 Bristol, Virginia, U.S.
- Died: March 23, 1931 (aged 72) Richmond, Virginia, U.S.
- Resting place: Hollywood Cemetery
- Party: Democratic
- Education: King College

William Francis Rhea (April 20, 1858 – March 23, 1931) was a U.S. representative from Virginia, a Virginia state court judge, and a member of the Virginia State Corporation Commission.

== Biography ==
Born on a farm near Bristol, Virginia in Washington County, Rhea attended rural and private schools. He graduated from King College in Bristol, Tennessee, in 1878, studied law and was admitted to the bar in 1879 and commenced practice in Bristol, Virginia. He served as judge of the county court for Washington County in the years 1880–1885. He served as member of the Senate of Virginia in the years 1885–1888. He served as judge of the Corporation Court for the City of Bristol, Virginia. He resigned in 1895 and resumed the practice of law.

Rhea was elected as a Democrat to the Fifty-sixth and Fifty-seventh Congresses (March 4, 1899 – March 3, 1903), defeating James A. Walker, the previous incumbent. Walker contested the result of both elections. At a deposition related to the 1898, a shootout occurred, and Walker was wounded. The contest of the 1900 election ended on the death of Walker in 1901.

Rhea was an unsuccessful candidate for reelection in 1902 to the Fifty-eighth Congress, losing to the Republican Campbell Slemp, and resumed the practice of law in Bristol, Virginia. He moved to Richmond, Virginia, when appointed a member of the State Corporation Commission in 1908 and served until 1925. Rhea made his home in Richmond across the street from the Robert E. Lee camp for confederate veterans; the house built in 1922 on Grove Avenue is now the "Museum District Bed and Breakfast," near the Virginia Museum of Fine Arts.

Rhea died in Richmond on March 23, 1931. He was interred in Hollywood Cemetery.

== Sources ==
- United States Congress. "William F. Rhea (id: R000183)". Biographical Directory of the United States Congress.

U.S. House of Representatives
Preceded by James A. Walker	Member of the U.S. House of Representatives from Virginia's 9th congressional district March 4, 1899 – March 3, 1903	Succeeded by Campbell Slemp
