= Southwest Virginia Museum Historical State Park =

State park in Virginia, USA

- U.S. National Register of Historic Places
- Virginia Landmarks Register
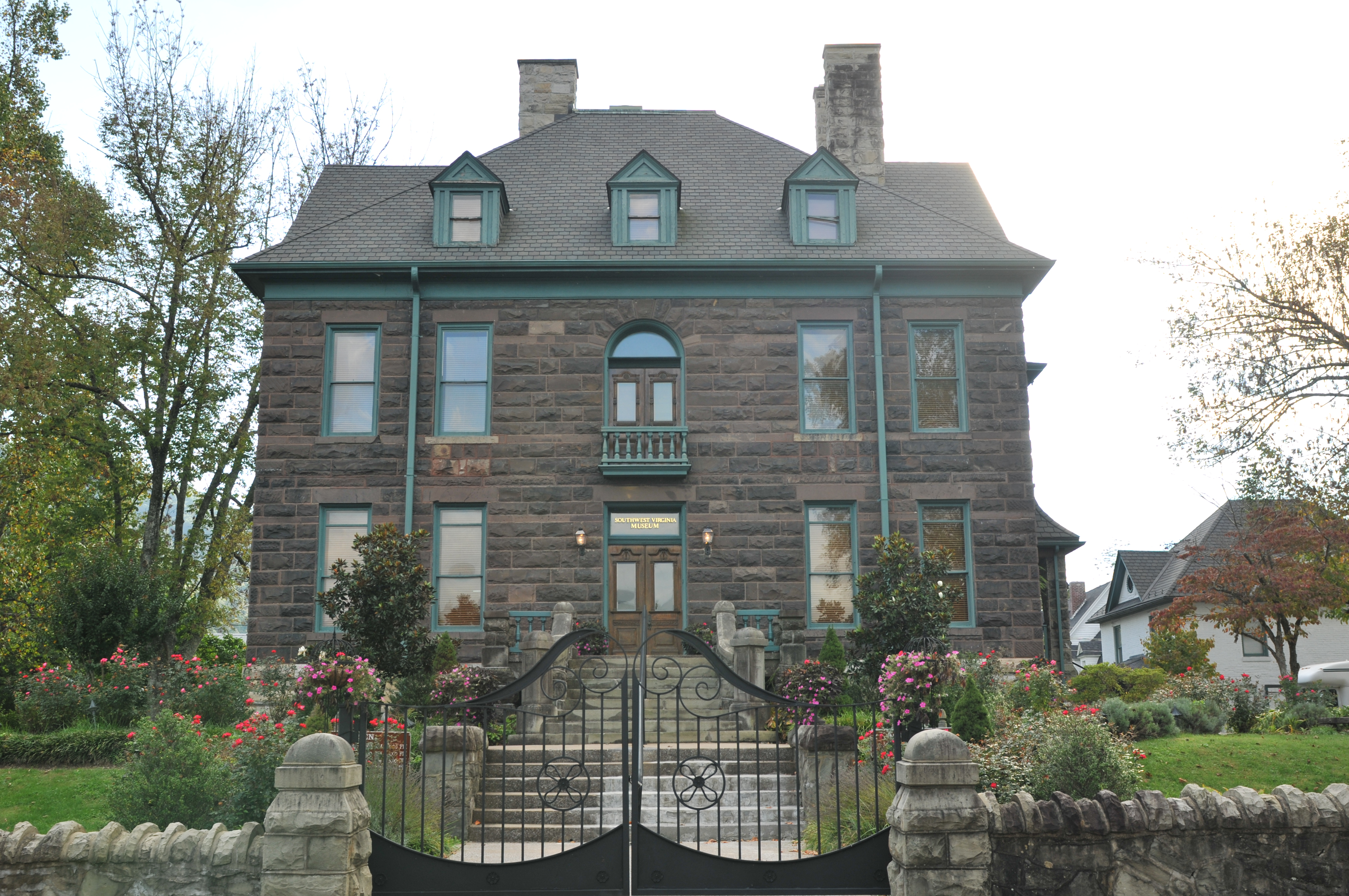
- Southwest Virginia Museum, September 2013

- Location within Virginia Location within the United States
- Location: 10 W 1st St N, Big Stone Gap, VA 24219
- Coordinates: 36°51′48″N 82°46′49″W
- Area: 1 acre (0.40 ha)
- Built: 1895
- Architect: Johnson, Charles Ralph, Sr.; Campbell, Edmund Schureman
- Architectural style: Queen Anne
- NRHP reference No.: 02001362
- VLR No.: 101-0002

Significant dates
- Added to NRHP: November 22, 2002
- Designated VLR: September 11, 2002

The Southwest Virginia Museum Historical State Park is a Virginia museum, run as a state park, dedicated to preserving the history of the southwestern part of the commonwealth. It is located in Big Stone Gap, in a house built in the 1880s for former Virginia Attorney General, Rufus A. Ayers. It was designed and built by Charles A. Johnson. Construction began in 1888 and was completed in 1895.

The limestone and sandstone used on the exterior walls came from area quarries. Red oak lines the interior walls and ceilings. A small moat once surrounded the house.

The structure was acquired by the state in 1946 from a foundation managed by C. Bascom Slemp. Much of the museum's collection focuses on the coal boom of the 1890s; there are also exhibits dedicated to the history of Big Stone Gap and the surrounding area, as well as the story of the pioneers who migrated westward during the 18th century. The museum is also the location of the Southwest Virginia Walk of Fame.

The museum building was listed on the National Register of Historic Places in 2002.

== See also ==
- National Register of Historic Places listings in Wise County, Virginia
- List of Virginia state parks
- List of Virginia state forests
