= 64th Anti-Aircraft Artillery Division =

- Active: October 1943–c. late 1940s
- Country: Soviet Union
- Branch: Red Army (later Soviet Army)
- Type: Anti-Aircraft Artillery
- Engagements: World War II
- Decorations: Order of the Red Banner
- Battle honours: Praga; Brandenburg

The 64th Anti-Aircraft Artillery Division (Russian: 64-я зенитная артиллерийская дивизия) was an anti-aircraft artillery division of the Soviet Union's Red Army (later the Soviet Army) during World War II and the early postwar period.

Formed in late 1943 in the Moscow Military District, the division spent the next several months conducting training. In the northern hemisphere spring of 1944 it was sent into combat, serving with the 47th Army and then the 33rd Army. The division ended the war in the Berlin Offensive, and received the honorifics Praga and Brandenburg for its actions, as well as the Order of the Red Banner. It was disbanded by the end of the 1950s.

== World War II ==
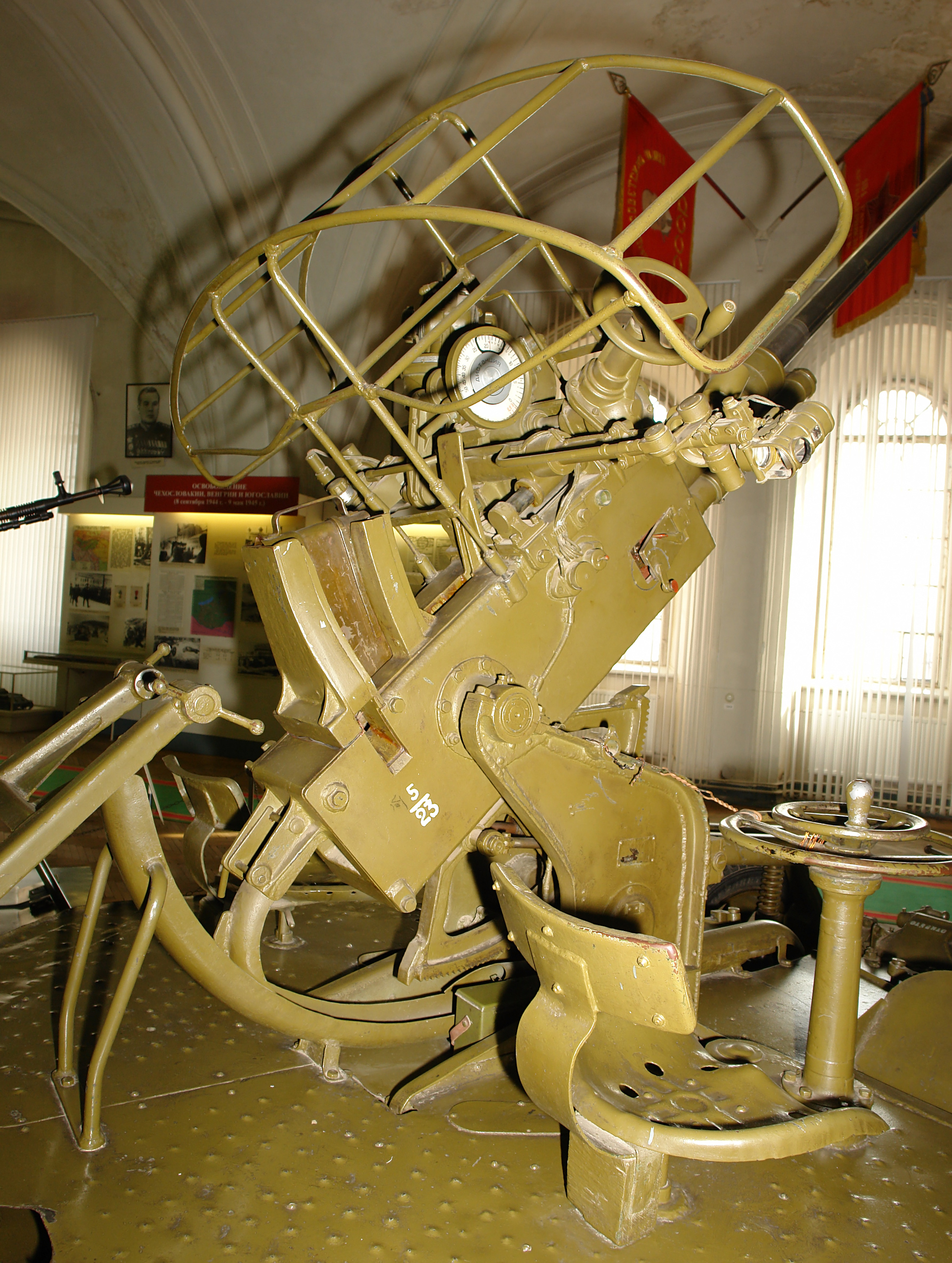
A 37 mm AA gun of the type used by the division during World War II

The division was formed on or around 1 October 1943, when Colonel Semyon Dzemeshkevich was appointed commander. Part of the Moscow Military District, it included the 1979th, 1983rd, 1987th, and the 1991st Anti-Aircraft Artillery Regiments. The division conducted combat training, during which Dzemeshkevich was relieved of command on 24 January 1944 due to what superiors considered leadership failures, involving the loss of weapons and secret documents, among other issues. He was replaced by Colonel (promoted to Major General on 2 November) Mikhail Rodichev, who led the division for the rest of the war. In March it was sent into combat, covering troops of the 2nd Belorussian Front's 47th Army. In April the army was transferred to the 1st Belorussian Front, fighting in battles at Kovel. For his "skilled leadership" in the fighting, Rodichev was awarded the Order of the Red Banner on 3 September. Subsequently, the 64th provided air defense for river crossings over the Turija River, the Western Bug, the advance into Poland, and the capture of Włodawa, Międzyrzec Podlaski, Łuków, Stoczek, Siedlce, Kałuszyn, Demblin, Wołomin, Praga, and Jabłonna.

For their actions, three of the division's regiments received the honorific Demblin, and on 31 October it received the honorific Praga. Between January and May 1945 the division supported the 33rd Army of the 1st Belorussian Front. It fought in the breakout from the Puławy bridgehead during the Vistula–Oder Offensive, advancing against Kazimierz, and the subsequent pursuit to the Oder. For his leadership Rodichev was awarded the Order of Kutuzov, 2nd class. In the final weeks of the war, the 64th fought in the advance from the Oder to the Elbe, part of the Berlin Offensive. For its actions the division received the honorific Brandenburg and the Order of the Red Banner.

== Postwar ==
Rodichev commanded the division until November. The division was among those anti-aircraft artillery divisions disbanded without being converted into another unit by the end of the 1950s.
