= 64 Squadron =

64 Squadron or 64th Squadron may refer to:

- No. 64 Squadron RAF, a unit of the United Kingdom Royal Air Force
- 64th Aggressor Squadron, a unit of the United States Air Force

== See also ==
- 64th Division (disambiguation)
- 64th Regiment (disambiguation)
