= Frank S. Blair =

American politician

Attorney General of Virginia
- In office January 1st, 1882 – January 1st, 1886
- Governor: William Evelyn Cameron
- Preceded by: James G. Field
- Succeeded by: Rufus A. Ayers

Personal details
- Born: November 6th, 1839; Jonesboro, Tennessee
- Died: January 14, 1899; Wytheville, Virginia
- Political party: Readjuster
- Spouse: Sallie K Pierce
- Education: Emory and Henry College and University of Tennessee
- Profession: Lawyer • Politician

Frank S. Blair (1839 – January 14, 1899) was a Virginia lawyer who served as Attorney General of Virginia.

The son of Tennessee congressman John Blair, Frank Blair was an officer in the Confederate Army, then practiced law in Wythe County, Virginia.

As the Readjuster Party candidate for Attorney General in 1881, Blair was elected despite the emergence during the campaign of forged letters, containing racist remarks, said to have been written by him. The forgery was revealed prior to Election Day. Blair's term as Attorney General coincided with the governorship of William E. Cameron.

In 1885, Blair lost the nomination for governor, ran for re-election as attorney general, and was defeated by the Democrat Rufus A. Ayers.

Blair attended the Republican National Conventions in 1884 and 1888.

President Benjamin Harrison resisted efforts to have Blair named Solicitor General of the United States.
