= 64th Brigade =

64th Brigade may refer to:

== British India ==
- 64th Indian Infantry Brigade, British Indian Army formation during World War II

== Russia ==
- 64th Separate Guards Motor Rifle Brigade

== United Kingdom ==
- 64th Anti-Aircraft Brigade
- 64th Brigade (United Kingdom), British Army infantry formation during World War I
- 64th Brigade, Royal Field Artillery, British Army unit during World War I
- 64th (7th London) Brigade, Royal Field Artillery, British Army unit after World War I
- 64th (Northumbrian) Anti-Aircraft Brigade, Royal Artillery

== See also ==
- 64th Brigade Support Battalion (United States)
- 64th Division (disambiguation)
- 64th Regiment (disambiguation)
