= Pound Gap =

Pass through Pine mountain ridge of the Appalachians

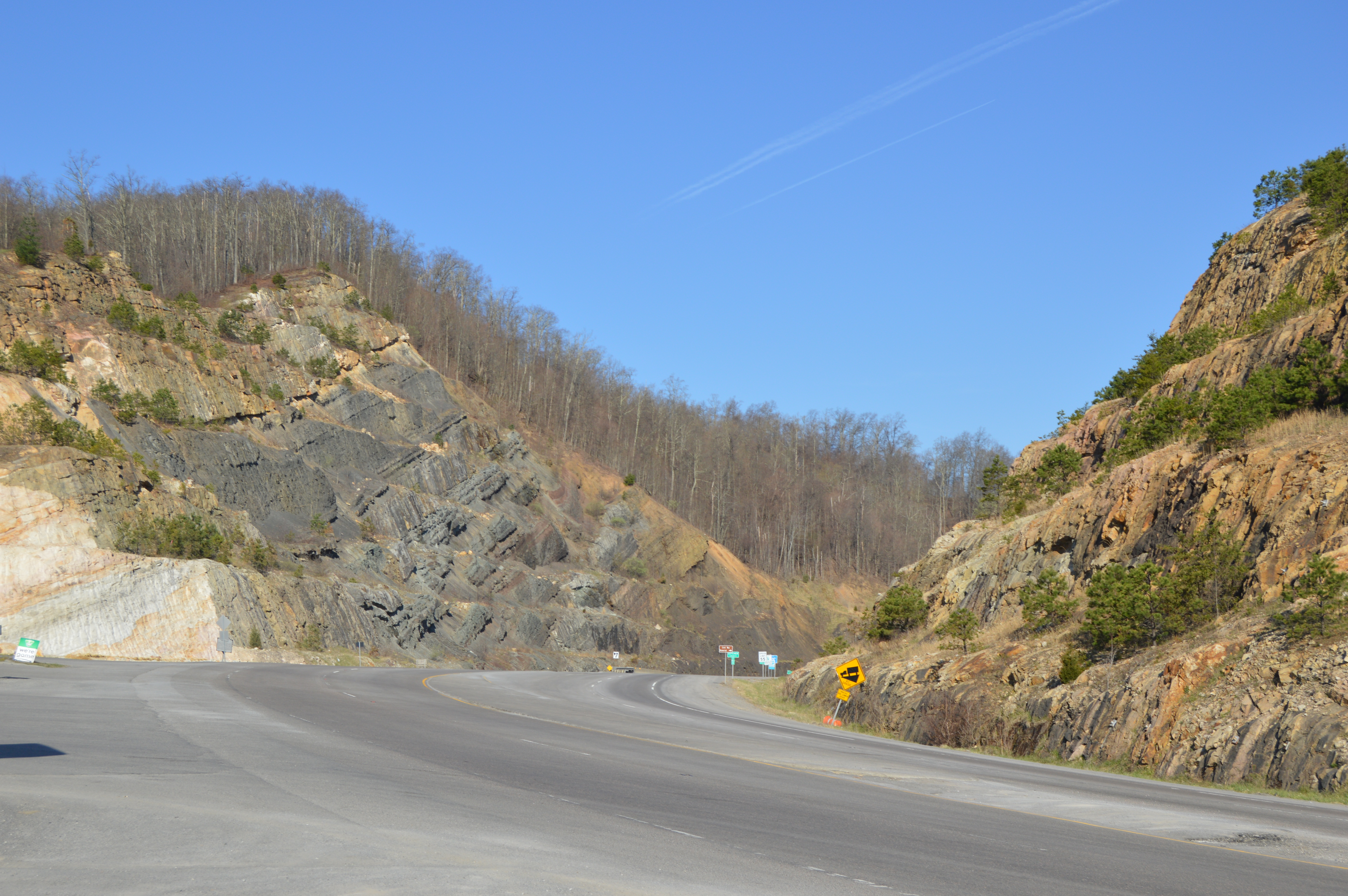
- Looking into the gap from the east
- Interactive map of Pound Gap
- Elevation: 2,392 ft (729 m)
- Traversed by: US 23

Location
- Location: Letcher County, Kentucky / Wise County, Virginia, United States
- Range: Cumberland Mountains
- Coordinates: 37°09′17″N 82°37′58″W

The Pound Gap of Pine Mountain is on the Virginia/Kentucky border between Jenkins, Kentucky and Pound, Virginia. It served as a passage for early settlers to cross into southeastern Kentucky, from southwestern Virginia. Today, U.S. Route 23 passes through the gap.

== History ==
In 1750, early surveyors for the Ohio Company, possibly including Christopher Gist, passed through the gap. Many hunters used the gap to cross into Kentucky from Virginia for the next ten years. In 1774, Daniel Boone used the gap to cross into Kentucky, along with Michael Stoner, to warn the land surveyors of a possible attack from the Shawnee Indians. Boone referred to the Pound Gap as the "Sounding Gap". Circa 1800, some the first pioneer families of eastern Kentucky came to Kentucky through the Pound Gap, or perhaps, through the nearby "Flat Gap," just 6 miles away. In Letcher County today, there are hundreds of the descendants of these pioneers. The first family came in 1791, which was the Back's, led by Joseph Back and his wife, Elizabeth Hoffman-Maggard Back. Around 1798, seven additional families came here: the Adamses, the Webbs, the Caudills, the Crafts, the Hammonds, the Sturgills, and the Collinses. The Hoggs, Maggards, Wrights, Fraziers, Fieldses, Bates, Halls, Bentleys, and Hamptons followed closely after the first settlement.

In 1834, the General Assembly of Kentucky passed an act to improve the road (one of "Kentucky's Wilderness Traces") from Mount Sterling to the Pound Gap, to make travel to western Virginia more accessible. The route was widely used to drive livestock (horses, hogs and cattle) into Virginia and other southern markets and was shorter than other routes. The Mount Sterling - Pound Gap road was considered "the longest pre-Civil War state road" The route roughly follows modern day KY 11, from Mount Sterling to Clay City, then KY 15, from Clay City to Whitesburg, and finally, US 119, from Whitesburg, along the Kentucky River, to its headwaters in the Pound Gap.

In 1861, the Confederate States Army regiment, under the command of Colonel John S. Williams, took control of the gap. On March 16, 1862, 800 Union soldiers from the 42nd Ohio Infantry, under the command of Brigadier General James A. Garfield, came from Piketon, (present day Pikeville) to the Battle of Pound Gap, forcing the 500 Confederate soldiers (under command of Major John Thompson) after the deadly battle to retreat. General Garfield was the youngest (Union) general of the war, and gained fame from the Battle of Pound Gap.

On May 14, 1892, Dr M.B. Taylor, also known as "The Red Fox", and two confederates, Henan and Cal Fleming, ambushed Ira Mullins, a local moonshiner and his family. The ambush killed five out of seven people who were in the caravan at a rock near the Pound Gap, now called "Killing Rock". It was reported August 18, 1892 in the Richmond Dispatch that the grave of Ira Mullins was desecrated by an explosion similar to dynamite. Taylor was hanged at the Wise County Courthouse on October 27, 1893, for the murders. The Red Fox Trail & Killing Rock is now a hiking trail in the Jefferson National Forest.

On November 30, 1927, Leonard Woods, a black coal miner and resident of Jenkins, Kentucky, was lynched on the Virginia-Kentucky border at the Pound Gap. Woods had been jailed in Kentucky for the murder of 29-year-old Herschel Deaton of Coeburn, Virginia, following an altercation on November 27. On the night of the lynching, a crowd estimated between 400 and 500 surrounded the Kentucky jail Woods was held in and demanded he be released to their custody. The crowd then transported Woods to a wooden structure located in the Pound Gap, adjacent to the recently constructed US 23 highway. At that time, the mob, estimated at 1,500, oversaw the hanging of Woods, followed by the firing of over 500 shots at his body, according to a local reporter. Both Virginia and Kentucky authorities claimed they were not responsible for investigating the crime, and no one was prosecuted for the death of Leonard Woods.

== Geological features ==
The Pound Gap mountain pass is known as a wind gap, as streams no longer flow through it.

During the construction of the new section of US 23 in 1998, the "Pine Mountain Pound Gap Thrust Fault" was exposed. "The collision of the North American continent with Africa and Europe more than 275 million years ago formed the Appalachian Mountains and the thrust fault at Pound Gap". Geologists consider the exposed rock to be "one of the most remarkable exposures of rock in the entire eastern United States". On September 26, 1998, Pound Gap was declared Kentucky's first Distinguished Geologic Site by the Kentucky Society of Professional Geologists.

== See also ==
- Cumberland Gap
- Moccasin Gap
