= Seminary, Virginia =

Unincorporated community in Virginia, United States

Coordinates: 36°48′38″N 82°50′01″W

Seminary is an unincorporated community in Lee County, Virginia, United States. The community was previously known as Turkey Cove. During the Civil War, the 64th Virginia Infantry trained on the community's church grounds, partly because its chaplain was Reuben Steele.

== History ==
Seminary was named after the local United Methodist Church seminary.
