= 64th Virginia Mounted Infantry Regiment =

- Flag of Virginia, 1861
- Active: December 1862 – April 1865
- Disbanded: April 1865
- Country: Confederacy
- Allegiance: Confederate States of America
- Type: Infantry; Cavalry; Mounted infantry
- Role: Dragoons
- Nickname: 64th Virginia Cavalry
- Engagements: American Civil War

Commanders
- Notable commanders: Colonel Campbell Slemp; Colonel Auburn L. Pridemore

The 64th Virginia Mounted Infantry Regiment was formed from troops raised in Lee, Scott, Wise and Buchanan counties in Virginia for service in the Confederate States Army during the American Civil War. It served as an infantry regiment, a cavalry regiment, and a mounted infantry (dragoon) unit, and had a mixed reputation.

Its troops originally were recruited in 1861 as the 21st Virginia Infantry Battalion, or the "Pound Gap Battalion", with assurances that they would be fighting mostly near home in western Virginia, and eastern Tennessee and Kentucky. Many failed to re-enlist after their year of service ended in 1862. Morale was a problem, in part because of the poor clothing and provisions they were issued, as well as their initial duties of arresting and guarding Unionists in the tri-state region. Also, the 64th Virginia gained a reputation for lack of discipline.

The 64th Regiment Virginia Mounted Infantry was organized in December 1862 in Abingdon, by consolidating the 21st and 29th Virginia Infantry Battalions. The 21st had been raised by Confederate Brigadier General Felix K. Zollicoffer (former Tennessee congressman) and Major John B. Thompson after the 1861 harvest, with soldiers volunteering for a year's service. It was supposed to defend Southwest Virginia from Pike County, Kentucky and the watershed of the Tug River to the Saltville, Virginia saltworks, including the Cumberland Gap. Its commander, Brigadier General Humphrey Marshall (a former Kentucky congressman) wanted these troops sent to Nashville, Tennessee, but the 5th Kentucky was sent instead, and the 21st Virginia did not have much recruiting success in Harlan County, Kentucky in 1862. Also, opposing forces led by Union Colonel (later General and President) James A. Garfield tried to win the hearts and minds of Kentuckians and Southwest Virginians (which had no voters for Republican candidate Lincoln in the 1860 Presidential election, residents voting mostly for Breckinridge of Kentucky, whom Gen. Marshall had also supported, but a great percentage of whom enlisted once secession was declared and the harvest gathered).

However, General Zollicoffer died in the Battle of Mill Springs in Kentucky on January 18, 1862, and so had limited association with the unit, and General Marshall would also resign in the late spring (he later withdraw his resignation but was assigned elsewhere).

On September 9, 1863, Confederate brevet General John W. Frazer (the nomination was withdrawn after this debacle) surrendered most of this (dismounted) unit at the Cumberland Gap to Union General Ambrose Burnside. Col. Campbell Slemp of the 64th Virginia and Major Byron G. McDowell of the 62nd North Carolina however, slipped out into the mountains with about 600 men rather than surrender, and re-formed their unit at Zollicoffer, Tennessee (now Bluff City, Tennessee). Captain William R. Boles of the 64th Virginia jumped on Col. Frazer and tried to beat him up when he heard the order, but was pulled off by Union officers. Many of the 1,026 Confederate prisoners (425 of them members of this unit, plus troops from Georgia, North Carolina, Kentucky, and Tennessee) were sent to Louisville, Kentucky then to Camp Douglas (Chicago). There, about 150 died in the unsanitary conditions and 43 men enlisted in the Union Army or Navy to escape the horrible prison camp. Col. Frazer wrote his official account of the Battle of the Cumberland Gap while a Union prisoner at another camp.

The surrender necessitated a late 1863 reorganization; the unit was sometimes known as the 64th Virginia Mounted Infantry or the 64th Virginia Infantry. After September 1, 1863, it was also called the 64th Virginia Cavalry because another reorganization in October 1863 briefly placed the 64th Virginia in Brig. John Stuart Williams' Cavalry Brigade. However, that brigade drew ill will in the Lee County area by its methods of confiscating provisions, especially horses to replace mounts. Moreover, on October 20, 1863, a federal raiding party sent by Union General Wilcox surprised Slemp's encamped 64th Infantry near Jonesville and managed to destroy much of their equipment and supplies. On November 5, 1863, Williams' brigade managed to intercept the federal raiders, but the 64th Virginia basically tagged along. In January 1864, Col. Slemp was court-martialed by Brig. Gen. "Grumble" Jones for dereliction of duty based on events of November 7, 1863, when Slemp ordered 10 or 15 wagons captured from the enemy moved, endangering the column if attacked while on the road from Rogersville to Blountville. Although many Virginians (including legislators) tried to get the charges dropped (and his Lt. Col. Auburn L. Pridemore tried to press charges against Gen. Jones for leapfrogging past Col. Giltner's 4th Kentucky Cavalry and crossing the Holston River behind enemy forces on that specified date), Capt. H. Brown of the 8th Virginia Cavalry and Major Rhea of Tennessee (neither units in Williams' command) continued to press the dereliction and ill-discipline charges. Col. Slemp hurt his cause by slipping house arrest in Abingdon prior to trial and instead returning home to Lee County; he was convicted, relieved of command and dismissed from the Confederate army.

Later the 64th Virginia continued to confront the Federals in various conflicts in East Tennessee, Western Virginia, and North Carolina until the war's end. However, its equipment and manpower problems continued. During April 1864, it totaled 268 effectives, but in April 1865, fewer than 50 disbanded.

The major field officers (all future U.S. congressmen) were Colonels Campbell Slemp of Company A, Auburn L. Pridemore of Company C, and Lieutenant Colonel James B. Richmond (after January 1863); as well as Major Harvey Gray (of Company E and F, especially after February 1864).

== See also ==
- List of Virginia Civil War units
