= 64th Division =

In military terms, 64th Division or 64th Infantry Division may refer to:

== Infantry Divisions ==
- 64th Infantry Division (Wehrmacht), Germany
- 64th Infantry Division of Urmia, Iran
- 64th Infantry Division "Catanzaro", Italy
- 64th Division (Imperial Japanese Army)
- 64th Infantry Division (Russian Empire)
- 64th Guards Mechanized Division, Soviet Union
- 64th Rifle Division (1925–1941), Soviet Union
- 64th Rifle Division (1942–1945), Soviet Union
- 64th Guards Rifle Division, Soviet Union
- 64th (2nd Highland) Division, United Kingdom

== Cavalry Divisions ==
- 64th Cavalry Division (United States)

== Aviation Divisions ==
- 64th Air Division, United States

== Other divisions ==
- 64th Anti-Aircraft Artillery Division

== See also ==
- List of military divisions by number
- 64th Brigade (disambiguation)
- 64th Regiment (disambiguation)
- 64th Squadron (disambiguation)
