= 64th Regiment =

64th Regiment or 64th Infantry Regiment may refer to:

- Loudon's Highlanders, a unit of the British Army raised in 1745 and ranked as 64th Foot
- 64th (2nd Staffordshire) Regiment of Foot, a unit of the British Army
- 64th (Liverpool Irish) Lancashire Rifle Volunteer Corps, a unit of the British Territorial Army
- 64th (Queen's Own Royal Glasgow Yeomanry) Anti-Tank Regiment, Royal Artillery, British Yeomanry unit
- 64th Armor Regiment, a unit of the US Army
- 64th Infantry Regiment (United States), a unit of the US Army

American Civil War

Union (Northern) Army

- 64th Illinois Volunteer Infantry Regiment
- 64th New York Volunteer Infantry Regiment
- 64th Ohio Infantry
- 64th United States Colored Infantry Regiment

Confederate (Southern) Army

- 64th Virginia Mounted Infantry

== See also ==
- 64th Division (disambiguation)
- 64th Squadron (disambiguation)
