= J. Lindsay Almond =

American judge (1898–1986)

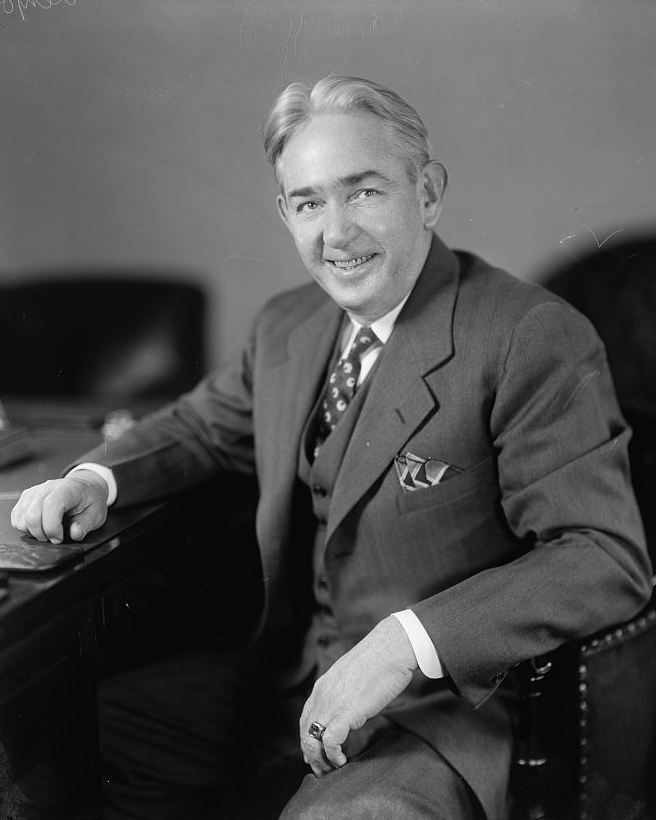

Senior Judge of the United States Court of Appeals for the Federal Circuit
- In office October 1, 1982 – April 14, 1986

Senior Judge of the United States Court of Customs and Patent Appeals
- In office March 1, 1973 – October 1, 1982

Associate Judge of the United States Court of Customs and Patent Appeals
- In office October 23, 1962 – March 1, 1973
- Appointed by: John F. Kennedy
- Preceded by: Ambrose O'Connell
- Succeeded by: Jack Miller

58th Governor of Virginia
- In office January 11, 1958 – January 13, 1962
- Lieutenant: Allie Edward Stakes Stephens
- Preceded by: Thomas B. Stanley
- Succeeded by: Albertis Harrison

26th Attorney General of Virginia
- In office February 11, 1948 – August 28, 1957
- Governor: William M. Tuck; John S. Battle; Thomas B. Stanley
- Preceded by: Harvey B. Apperson
- Succeeded by: Kenneth Cartwright Patty

Member of the U.S. House of Representatives from Virginia's 6th district
- In office January 22, 1946 – April 17, 1948
- Preceded by: Clifton A. Woodrum
- Succeeded by: Clarence G. Burton

Personal details
- Born: James Lindsay Almond Jr. June 15, 1898 Charlottesville, Virginia, U.S.
- Died: April 14, 1986 (aged 87) Richmond, Virginia, U.S.
- Resting place: Evergreen Burial Park; Roanoke, Virginia
- Party: Democratic
- Spouse: Josephine Katherine Minter (m.1925)
- Education: Virginia Tech; University of Virginia School of Law (LLB)

James Lindsay Almond Jr. (June 15, 1898 – April 14, 1986) was an American lawyer, jurist, and Democratic party politician. His political offices included as a member of the U.S. House of Representatives from Virginia's 6th congressional district (1946–1948), 26th attorney general of Virginia (1948–1957) and the 58th governor of Virginia (1958–1962). As a member of the Byrd Organization, Almond initially supported massive resistance to the integration of public schools following the United States Supreme Court decisions in Brown v. Board of Education, but when Virginia and federal courts ruled segregation unconstitutional, Almond worked with the legislature to end massive resistance.

Almond then became an associate judge of the United States Court of Customs and Patent Appeals (1962–1973), and after retiring, continued to serve as Senior Judge of the United States Court of Customs and Patent Appeals (1973–1982) and then Senior Judge of the United States Court of Appeals for the Federal Circuit from 1982, until his death in 1986.

== Early life ==
Almond was born in Charlottesville, Virginia and raised in Orange County, Virginia. Almond attended Virginia Tech and served as a private in the Students Army Training Corps in 1917 and 1918 in World War I. Afterwards he taught school in Locust Grove, in his native Orange County, then became a high school principal, while also studying and earned a Bachelor of Laws from the University of Virginia School of Law in 1923.

== Lawyer and state judge ==
Almond prosecuted criminals as assistant commonwealth attorney of Roanoke, Virginia from 1930 to 1933.

During the Great Depression, Virginia legislators elected him as a state court judge, and he served in the Hustings Court of Roanoke from 1933 to 1945. The Hustings Court handled family law matters as well as some misdemeanor offenses. In possibly his most famous case, discussed at length in the book Truevine, Judge Almond appointed what would today be called a guardian or conservator for two albino African-American men who had been abducted as children from their family's farm near Roanoke, and who toured as a sideshow attraction with the Ringling Brothers Circus for several years while only an unrelated White man received wages for them. Their mother recognized them in a photograph taken in Lincoln, Nebraska in 1936 and with the help of a local Virginia lawyer, secured both their release from the circus and damages, which unfortunately were mostly spent by their mother's second husband (who was shot during an adulterous affair). Later, they wished to return to the circus rather than stay unemployed at home, so at their and their lawyer's request, Judge Almond arranged for part of their salaries to be saved to support their retirement (four years before adoption of the Social Security Act), as well as to support their again-widowed mother, and enforced a similar arrangement when their manager took them touring with other circuses.

== Political career ==
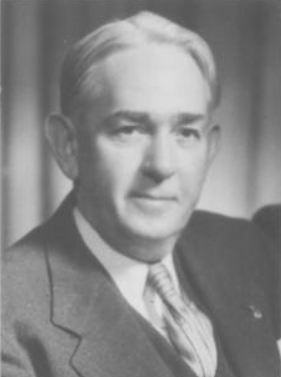
Almond as governor.

As World War II ended, Almond ran for Congress from Virginia's 6th congressional district. Elected to the United States House of Representatives, he served in the 79th and 80th Congresses.

Almond resigned his Congressional seat in 1948, when he was elected Attorney General of Virginia. In 1950 he would help eight black students led by Irving Linwood Peddrew III integrate Virginia Polytechnic Institute. Nevertheless, Arnold would argue the state's case for segregation of public schools before the United States Supreme Court in the case of Davis v. County School Board of Prince Edward County, which was consolidated with Brown v. Board of Education. Virginia lost both in 1954 and 1955.

Although not a favorite of United States Senator Harry F. Byrd, Almond had demonstrated loyalty to the Byrd Organization and racial segregation as well as to the national (Stevenson) ticket. Byrd had been offended by Almond's endorsement of Martin Hutchinson for the Federal Trade Commission and had refused to endorse Almond for governor in 1953 so Thomas B. Stanley was nominated and ultimately elected. By 1956, Byrd had announced the organization's policy of massive resistance, and as attorney-general, Almond had defended what became known as the Stanley Plan despite doubts about its constitutionality. In 1957, Almond resigned as attorney general (and Stanley appointed Kenneth Cartwright Patty to fill the rest of the term) and announced early for the Democratic nomination for governor. Almond refused Byrd's offer of a position on the Virginia Supreme Court conditioned upon his endorsing Byrd's preferred nominee, Garland Gray, firmly segregationist in allegiance.

Gray then withdrew from the Democratic primary, and Almond easily won the Democratic nomination for Governor of Virginia. His Republican opponent, Theodore Roosevelt Dalton, would have allowed racial integration of the public schools pursuant to court orders. Almond offered segregationist rhetoric in most locations and won election as Virginia's governor a month after President Dwight Eisenhower sent troops to enforce a desegregation order in Little Rock, Arkansas, over the opposition of its governor, Orval Faubus.

Almond took office in January 1958 for a volatile term that ended in 1962. On January 19, 1959, the Virginia Supreme Court and a three judge federal panel both found the Stanley Plan unconstitutional. Almond initially protested denouncing the federal court rulings in a fiery speech blasting "those whose purpose and design is to blend and amalgamate of the white and negro races" and citing "the livid stench of sadism, sex immorality, and juvenile pregnancy infesting the mixed schools of the District of Columbia and elsewhere," but he soon called a special legislative session and, to the fury of Byrd, James J. Kilpatrick, and others, announced that he would not resist the federal court orders.

He allowed public schools in Arlington and Norfolk to desegregate peacefully by to court orders on February 5, 1959. Heeding the advice of several moderates within his own party, including Senator Mosby Perrow Jr., Almond realized that opposition to desegregation was ultimately futile, as the state continued to lose in the courts. In April 1959, Almond and his lieutenant governor, Allie Edward Stakes Stephens, helped Perrow and Stuart B. Carter of Fincastle, Virginia narrowly secure passage of bills which allowed localities to determine whether to desegregate their schools.

Schools in Albemarle and Warren Counties opened and followed desegregation orders, but the schools in Prince Edward County remained closed until 1963, and the tuition assistance program that supported segregation academies remained in effect until 1968 when the United States Supreme Court decided Green v. County School Board of New Kent County. Thus, except for Prince Edward County, massive resistance had been transformed into passive resistance against school desegregation.

However, Harry F. Byrd Jr. and longtime Byrd lieutenant E. Blackburn Moore defeated Almond's request for a sales tax in 1960, which some saw as retaliation for allowing school desegregation. Stephens resigned just before the end of the year to run for governor (following Almond's early declaration example). However, the Byrd Organization slated Albertis Harrison (the attorney general who had supported segregation and litigation against the NAACP) as their candidate. Stephens lost in the 1961 Democratic primary, which ended his elected career, while Byrd loyalist Mills Godwin defeated moderate Armistead Boothe for lieutenant governor. However, the machine's vote shares were lower than previously. Both Harrison and Godwin won election in November, with Robert Young Button being elected attorney general.

== Federal judicial service ==
After campaigning for President John F. Kennedy in 1960, President Kennedy nominated Almond to the United States Court of Customs and Patent Appeals on April 16, 1962. However Senator Byrd blocked a Senate floor vote and the nomination expired without action. Almond received a recess appointment from President Kennedy on October 23, 1962, to an Associate Judge seat on the United States Court of Customs and Patent Appeals vacated by Associate Judge Ambrose O'Connell. He was nominated to the same position by President Kennedy on January 15, 1963. He was confirmed by the United States Senate on June 28, 1963, 164 days after his nomination (more than a year after the first nomination, which Byrd had said he would not block) when Senator Byrd, who was still blocking his nomination, missed a floor session. Byrd's vindictiveness toward Almond eventually undermined the Byrd Organization. Almond received his commission on July 3, 1963. He assumed senior status on March 1, 1973. He was reassigned by operation of law to the United States Court of Appeals for the Federal Circuit on October 1, 1982, pursuant to 96 Stat. 25. His service terminated on April 14, 1986, due to his death.

=== Elections ===
- 1946; Almond was elected to the U.S. House of Representatives in a special election unopposed. He was re-elected in the general election with 64.78% of the vote, defeating Republican Frank R. Angell and Socialist Ruby Mae Wilkes.
- 1957; Almond was elected Governor of Virginia with 63.15% of the vote, defeating Republican Theodore R. Dalton and Independent C. Gilmer Brooks.

== Personal life ==
Almond married Josephine Katherine Minter in 1925. He was a Lutheran and taught a men's bible class. He was a 32nd degree Mason, a Shriner, and a member of Alpha Kappa Psi and Omicron Delta Kappa.

== Death ==
Almond died on April 14, 1986, in Richmond, Virginia. He and his wife Josephine Minter Almond are buried in Evergreen Burial Park in Roanoke, Virginia, in her family's plot. The couple had no children, but had raised one of her nephews as their son.

== Sources ==
Party political offices
Preceded by Thomas B. Stanley	Democratic nominee for Governor of Virginia; 1957	Succeeded by Albertis Harrison
U.S. House of Representatives
Preceded by Clifton A. Woodrum	Member of the United States House of Representatives from Virginia's 6th congressional district 1946–1948	Succeeded by Clarence G. Burton
Legal offices
Preceded by Harvey B. Apperson	Attorney General of Virginia; 1948–1957	Succeeded by Kenneth Cartwright Patty
Preceded by Ambrose O'Connell	Associate Judge of the United States Court of Customs and Patent Appeals; 1962–1973	Succeeded by Jack Miller
Political offices
Preceded by Thomas B. Stanley	Governor of Virginia; 1958–1962	Succeeded by Albertis Harrison
