= Nora Spencer Hamner =

American nurse (1895–1971)

- Born: January 6, 1895; Buckingham County, Virginia, U.S.
- Died: November 17, 1971 (aged 76); Richmond, Virginia, U.S.
- Resting place: Forest Lawn Cemetery; Richmond, Virginia
- Education: Memorial Hospital Training School
- Occupation: Public health nurse
- Relatives: Earl Hamner (nephew)

Nora Spencer Hamner (January 6, 1895 – November 17, 1971) was an American public health nurse known for her work fighting tuberculosis in Virginia. She is known as the first public health nurse trained in Virginia.

== Early life and education ==
Nora Spencer Hamner was born on January 6, 1895, in Buckingham County, Virginia, to Susan (née Henry) and Walter Clifton Hamner. She graduated from Schuyler High School in Schuyler, Virginia in 1906. She graduated from the Memorial Hospital Training School in Richmond in 1914.

== Career ==
Hamner was a nurse and supervisor at the Memorial Hospital from 1913 to 1914. She was a public health nurse in Darlington County, South Carolina from 1914 to 1917. She then traveled as a field nurse across southwest Virginia to assist towns across 47 counties with developing clinics to diagnose tuberculosis.

She served as the executive secretary of the Richmond Tuberculosis Association from 1919 to March 31, 1962. In that role, she gave talks and worked with groups, including the Virginia General Assembly. She also played a large part of developing rehabilitation programs at the Pine Camp Tuberculosis Hospital.

Hamner helped recruit nurses in Virginia during World War II. She also helped recruit nurses during the polio epidemics of the 1940s and 1950s. She was a member of the Virginia Red Cross for 35 years.

Hamner was the first woman member of the Medical College of Virginia Board of Visitors and its executive committee. She was also on the board of trustees of the Medical College of Virginia Alumni Association of Virginia Commonwealth University. She was one of the founders of the Virginia Council on Health and Medical Care.

== Personal life ==
Hamner lived in Richmond and had a summer cottage with a wildflower sanctuary near the Blue Ridge Parkway. She was a specialist on wildflowers and an avid gardener. Hamner was a nationally accredited flower show judge.

She was the aunt of Earl Hamner.

== Death ==
Hamner died on November 17, 1971, in Richmond. She is buried at Forest Lawn Cemetery.

== Legacy and awards ==
Awards presented to Hamner:

- 1942 - Richmond Professional Institute presented the first Nancy Vance Pin Award to Hamner for her work as a public health nurse
- 1951 - Hamner received the first honorary degree presented to a woman by the Medical College of Virginia, a Master of Science in nursing
- Douglas Southall Freedom Award from the Virginia Tuberculosis Association

The Virginia Tuberculosis Association established the Nora Spencer Hamner Award. It is still presented by the American Lung Association of Virginia. The Medical College of Virginia Alumni Association of Virginia Commonwealth University helped raise funds for the Mahoney-Hamner Nursing Alumni Lectureship. It was named for Anne F. Mahoney and Hamner.
