= Forest Lawn Cemetery (Richmond, Virginia) =

Cemetery in Richmond, Virginia

Coordinates: 37.5945°N 77.4354°W

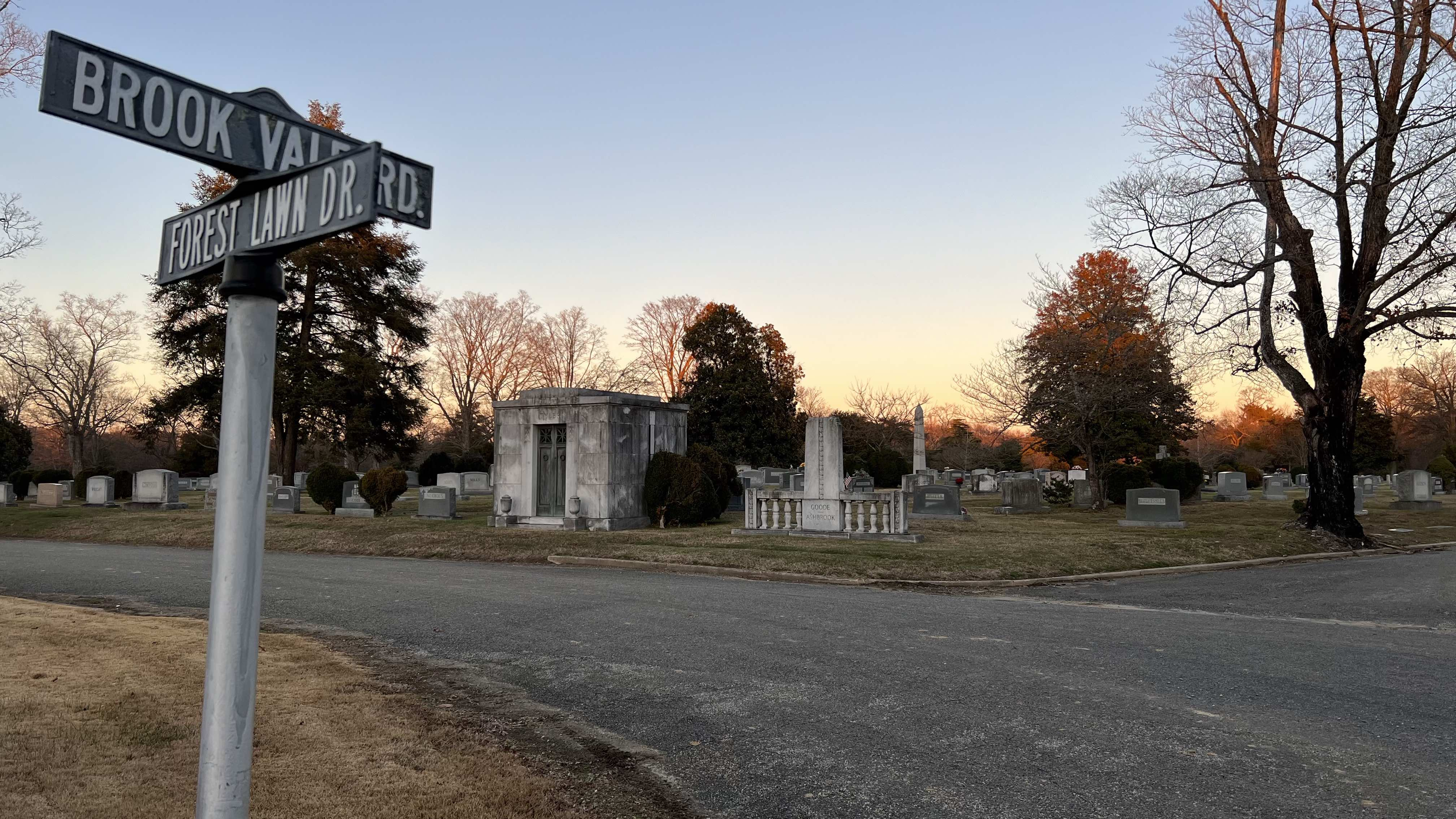
Forest Lawn Cemetery in Richmond, Virginia.

Forest Lawn Cemetery and Mausoleum is a cemetery located at 4000 Pilots Lane, Richmond, Virginia.

The cemetery was established in 1922. Previously it was the estate of John Carter and was known as Myrtle Grove Plantation. John Carter's grave and headstone and those of his relations living with him at Myrtle Grove are still intact among the newer headstones of Forest Lawn. Also, many of the street names within Forest Lawn include references to this origin, including Carter Lane and Myrtle Grove Lane.

Forest Lawn Cemetery was acquired in August 2013, by StoneMor Partners LP.

== Notable graves ==
- Nora Spencer Hamner, public health nurse
- Oliver Hill, civil rights attorney
- Mary Eugenia Benson Jobson (1872–1962), suffragist and activist
- Kenneth Cartwright Patty (1891–1967), Attorney General of Virginia
- Al Rosenbaum (1926–2009), artist
- Carl Julian Sanders (1912–2007), a bishop of the United Methodist Church
- Frederick William Sievers, sculptor

It also contains the Emek Sholom Holocaust Memorial Cemetery, one of the first memorials erected in the United States to victims of the Holocaust (1955).

== See also ==
- Hollywood Cemetery
