= Senator Hutchison (disambiguation) =

Kay Bailey Hutchison (born 1943) was a U.S. Senator from Texas from 1993 to 2013. Senator Hutchison may also refer to:

- Charles W. Hutchison (1865–1945), Wisconsin State Senate
- Mark Hutchison (born 1963), Nevada State Senate

== See also ==
- Senator Hutchinson (disambiguation)
- Joseph Collier Hutcheson (1906–1972), Virginia State Senate
