= Senator Hedges =

Senator Hedges may refer to:

- Charles Hedges (American politician) (1901–1978), Massachusetts State Senate
- Nathaniel Gates Hedges (1811–?), Iowa State Senate

== See also ==
- Senator Hodges (disambiguation)
