= Senator Hutchinson (disambiguation) =

Tim Hutchinson (born 1949) was a U.S. Senator from Arkansas from 1997 to 2003. Senator Hutchinson may also refer to:

- Almanzor Hutchinson (1811–1893), New York State Senate
- Buel Hutchinson (1826–1903), Wisconsin State Senate
- Donald P. Hutchinson (born 1945), Maryland State Senate
- Elijah C. Hutchinson (1855–1932), New Jersey State Senate
- J. Edward Hutchinson (1914–1985), Michigan State Senate
- Jeremy Young Hutchinson (born 1974), Arkansas State Senate
- Scott Hutchinson (born 1961), Pennsylvania State Senate
- Toi Hutchinson (born 1973), Illinois State Senate

== See also ==
- Senator Hutchison (disambiguation)
- Joseph Collier Hutcheson (1906–1972), Virginia State Senate
