= 80th United States Congress =

1947–1949 U.S. Congress

←	79th	81st	→
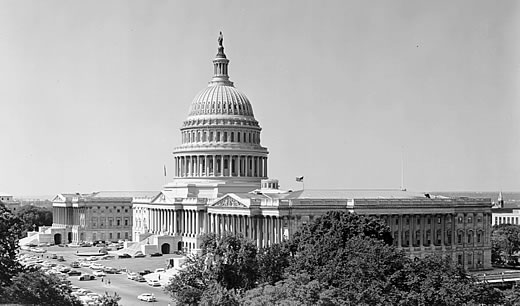
- United States Capitol (1956)

Overview
- Legislative body: United States Congress
- Jurisdiction: United States
- Term: January 3, 1947 – January 3, 1949

Senate
- Members: 96
- President: Vacant (Note: President pro tempore Arthur Vandenberg, U.S. Senator from Michigan acted his duties as the President of the Senate prior to the ratification of the Twenty-fifth Amendment.)
- President pro tempore: Arthur Vandenberg (R)
- Party control: Republican

House of Representatives
- Members: 435 representatives 3 non-voting delegates
- Speaker: Joseph W. Martin Jr. (R)
- Party control: Republican

Sessions
- 1st: January 3, 1947 – December 19, 1947
- Special (Note: Special session of the Senate.): November 17, 1947 – December 19, 1947
- 2nd: January 6, 1948 – December 31, 1948
- Special (Note: Special session of the Senate; this is the most recent instance of the Senate holding a special session.): July 26, 1948 – August 7, 1948

The 80th United States Congress was a meeting of the legislative branch of the United States federal government, composed of the United States Senate and the United States House of Representatives. It met in Washington, D.C. from January 3, 1947, to January 3, 1949, during the third and fourth years of 33rd President Harry S. Truman's administration (1945–1953). This congressional term featured the most recent special Senate sessions. The apportionment of seats in this House of Representatives was based on the 1940 United States census.

The Republicans won the majority in both chambers, marking the first time since the 71st Congress of 1929–1931 that they held full control of Congress, and the first time since the 72nd Congress of 1931–1933 that they held control of either of the two chambers. This also ended a 14-year Democratic overall federal government trifecta period, dating back to the 73rd Congress (1933–1935) when Truman's predecessor Franklin D. Roosevelt took office. This ties with the previous 14-year Republican trifecta from 1897 to 1911 as the longest trifectas of Congress, and is the last time (as of the year 2024) that a trifecta was achieved that lasted longer than a decade.

Although the 80th Congress passed a total of 906 public bills, President Truman nicknamed it during his campaign speeches and remarks as the "Do Nothing Congress" and, during the 1948 elections, campaigned as much against it as against his formal opponent, Thomas E. Dewey of New York, the Republican presidential nominee. The 80th Congress did, however, pass several significant bills with bipartisan support, most famously the Truman Doctrine (on Greece-Turkey anti-communists' aid in the developing Cold War with former ally the Soviet Union), the Marshall Plan (aid for devastated Europe after World War II), and the Taft–Hartley Act of 1947 on labor relations (over Truman's veto), but it opposed most of Truman's Fair Deal domestic programs bills.

== Major events ==
- January 3, 1947: Proceedings of the United States Congress were televised for the first time.
- March 12, 1947: In a Joint Session of Congress, President Truman proclaimed the Truman Doctrine.
- July 18, 1947: The Trust Territory of the Pacific Islands in the southwest Pacific Ocean (occupied since 1943-1945 of the Second World War), entered into a trusteeship with the new international organization United Nations and administered by the United States for the next few decades.
- November 24, 1947: The House of Representatives approved citations of contempt of Congress against the so-called Hollywood 10.
- July 20, 1948: President Truman issued the second peacetime military draft in the United States amid increasing tensions of the Cold War with the Soviet Union, which endured until the early 1970s.
- July 26, 1948:
  - Turnip Day Session begins, special session called by Truman on July 15, 1948, before November elections;
  - President Truman signed Executive Order 9981, ending racial segregation in the United States Armed Forces since the Reconstruction era of the 1860s/1870s.
- August 25, 1948: House of Representatives Un-American Activities Committee held the first-ever televised congressional hearing: "Confrontation Day" between alleged Communist sympathizers from the 1930s of Time magazine journalist Whittaker Chambers and former friend State Department official Alger Hiss.
- November 2, 1948: United States general elections, 1948:
  - Presidential election: Democrat incumbent President Harry Truman, in an upset victory, defeated Republican Thomas E. Dewey (Governor of New York), and third and fourth minority parties candidates: Governor of South Carolina (and longtime future U.S. Senator) Strom Thurmond, and former Vice President Henry A. Wallace;
  - Democrats regained majority control of both the Senate and the House of Representatives for the next two years in the coming 81st Congress.

== Major legislation ==
- May 22, 1947: Assistance to Greece and Turkey Act (Truman Doctrine), Sess. 1, ch. 81, Pub. L. 80–75, 61 Stat. 103
- June 23, 1947: Taft–Hartley Act, Sess. 1, ch. 120, Pub. L. 80–101, 61 Stat. 136
- July 18, 1947: Presidential Succession Act of 1947, Sess. 1, ch. 264, Pub. L. 80–199, 61 Stat. 380
- July 26, 1947: National Security Act of 1947, Sess. 1, ch. 343, Pub. L. 80–253, 61 Stat. 495
- August 7, 1947: Mineral Leasing Act for Acquired Lands, Sess. 1, ch. 513, Pub. L. 80–382, 61 Stat. 913
- January 27, 1948: United States Information and Educational Exchange Act, Sess. 2, ch. 36, Pub. L. 80–402, 62 Stat. 6
- April 3, 1948: Foreign Assistance Act (Marshall Plan), Pub. L. 80–472, Sess. 2, ch. 169, 62 Stat. 137
- April 3, 1948: Greek-Turkish Assistance Act of 1948 (Marshall Plan), Sess. 2, ch. 169, Pub. L. 80–472, Title III, 62 Stat. 157
- May 26, 1948: Civil Air Patrol Act, Sess. 2, ch. 349, Pub. L. 80–557, 62 Stat. 274
- June 12, 1948: Women's Armed Services Integration Act, Sess. 2, ch. 449, Pub. L. 80–625, 62 Stat. 356
- June 17, 1948: Reed-Bulwinkle Act, Sess. 2, ch. 491, Pub. L. 80–662, 62 Stat. 472
- June 25, 1948: Codify and enact into law Title 3 of the United States Code – "The President", Sess. 2, ch. 644, Pub. L. 80–771, 62 Stat. 672
- June 28, 1948: Commodity Credit Corporation Charter Act of 1948, Pub. L. 80–806, 62 Stat. 1070
- June 30, 1948: Federal Water Pollution Control Act, Sess. 2, ch. 758, Pub. L. 80–845, 62 Stat. 1155
- July 3, 1948: War Claims Act of 1948, Sess. 2, ch. 826, Pub. L. 80–896, 62 Stat. 1240
- July 3, 1948: Agricultural Act of 1948, Sess. 2, ch. 827, Pub. L. 80–897, 62 Stat. 1247

== Constitutional amendments ==
- March 21, 1947: Approved an amendment to the United States Constitution setting a term limit for election and overall time of service to the office of President of the United States, and submitted it to the state legislatures for ratification
  - Amendment was later ratified on February 27, 1951, becoming the Twenty-second Amendment to the United States Constitution

== Party summary ==
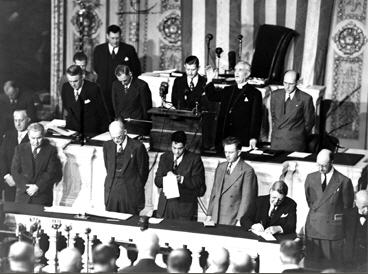
House Chaplain Bernard Braskamp delivering the opening prayer for the 80th Congress, 1947

=== Senate ===
	Party (shading shows control)			Total	Vacant
	Democratic (D)	Progressive (P)	Republican (R)	Total	Vacant
End of previous congress	53	1	42	96	0
Begin	45	0	51	96	0
End	45	0	51	96	0
Final voting share	46.9%	0.0%	53.1%		
Beginning of next congress	54	0	42	96	0

=== House of Representatives ===
From the beginning to the end of this Congress, there was no net change in party power. The Democrats lost one seat, which remained vacant until the next Congress.

Affiliation	Party (Shading indicates majority caucus)				Total	
Affiliation	Republican	Democratic	American Labor	Progressive	Total	Vacant
End of previous Congress	191	236	1	1	429	6
Begin	245	187	1	0	433	2
End	242	186	2	0	430	5
Final voting share	56.7%	43.1%	0.2%	0.0%		
Beginning of the next Congress	171	262	1	0	434	1

== Leadership ==
Section contents: Senate: Majority (R), Minority (D) • House: Majority (R), Minority (D)

=== Senate ===
- President: Vacant
- President pro tempore: Arthur Vandenberg (R)

==== Majority (Republican) leadership ====
- Majority leader: Wallace H. White Jr.
- Majority whip: Kenneth S. Wherry
- Republican Conference Chairman: Eugene Millikin
- Republican Conference Secretary: Milton Young
- National Senatorial Committee Chair: Owen Brewster
- Policy Committee Chairman: Robert A. Taft

==== Minority (Democratic) leadership ====
- Minority leader: Alben W. Barkley
- Minority whip: Scott W. Lucas
- Democratic Caucus Secretary: Brien McMahon
- Policy Committee Chairman: Alben W. Barkley

=== House of Representatives ===
- Speaker: Joseph W. Martin Jr. (R)

==== Majority (Republican) leadership ====
- Majority Leader: Charles A. Halleck
- Republican Whip: Leslie C. Arends
- Republican Conference Chairman: Roy O. Woodruff
- Republican Campaign Committee Chairman: Leonard W. Hall

==== Minority (Democratic) leadership ====
- Minority Leader: Sam Rayburn
- Democratic Whip: John W. McCormack
- Democratic Caucus Chairman: Aime Forand
- Democratic Campaign Committee Chairman: Michael J. Kirwan

== Caucuses ==
- House Democratic Caucus
- Senate Democratic Caucus

== Members ==
=== Senate ===
Senators are popularly elected statewide every two years, with one-third beginning new six-year terms with each Congress. Preceding the names in the list below are Senate class numbers, which indicate the cycle of their election, In this Congress, Class 2 meant their term ended with this Congress, requiring reelection in 1948; Class 3 meant their term began in the last Congress, requiring reelection in 1950; and Class 1 meant their term began in this Congress, requiring reelection in 1952.

==== Alabama ====
▌2. John J. Sparkman (D)
▌3. J. Lister Hill (D)

==== Arizona ====
▌1. Ernest McFarland (D)
▌3. Carl Hayden (D)

==== Arkansas ====
▌2. John L. McClellan (D)
▌3. J. William Fulbright (D)

==== California ====
▌1. William Knowland (R)
▌3. Sheridan Downey (D)

==== Colorado ====
▌2. Edwin C. Johnson (D)
▌3. Eugene Millikin (R)

==== Connecticut ====
▌1. Raymond E. Baldwin (R)
▌3. Brien McMahon (D)

==== Delaware ====
▌1. John J. Williams (R)
▌2. C. Douglass Buck (R)

==== Florida ====
▌1. Spessard Holland (D)
▌3. Claude Pepper (D)

==== Georgia ====
▌2. Walter F. George (D)
▌3. Richard Russell Jr. (D)

==== Idaho ====
▌2. Henry Dworshak (R)
▌3. Glen H. Taylor (D)

==== Illinois ====
▌2. Charles W. Brooks (R)
▌3. Scott W. Lucas (D)

==== Indiana ====
▌1. William E. Jenner (R)
▌3. Homer E. Capehart (R)

==== Iowa ====
▌2. George A. Wilson (R)
▌3. Bourke B. Hickenlooper (R)

==== Kansas ====
▌2. Arthur Capper (R)
▌3. Clyde M. Reed (R)

==== Kentucky ====
▌2. John Sherman Cooper (R)
▌3. Alben Barkley (D)

==== Louisiana ====
▌2. Allen J. Ellender (D)
▌3. John H. Overton (D), until May 14, 1948

▌William C. Feazel (D), May 18, 1948 – December 30, 1948
▌Russell B. Long (D), from December 31, 1948

==== Maine ====
▌1. Ralph Owen Brewster (R)
▌2. Wallace H. White Jr. (R)

==== Maryland ====
▌1. Herbert O'Conor (D)
▌3. Millard Tydings (D)

==== Massachusetts ====
▌1. Henry Cabot Lodge Jr. (R)
▌2. Leverett Saltonstall (R)

==== Michigan ====
▌1. Arthur H. Vandenberg (R)
▌2. Homer S. Ferguson (R)

==== Minnesota ====
▌1. Edward John Thye (R)
▌2. Joseph H. Ball (R)

==== Mississippi ====
▌1. Theodore G. Bilbo (D), until August 21, 1947

▌John C. Stennis (D), from November 17, 1947

▌2. James Eastland (D)

==== Missouri ====
▌1. James P. Kem (R)
▌3. Forrest C. Donnell (R)

==== Montana ====
▌1. Zales Ecton (R)
▌2. James E. Murray (D)

==== Nebraska ====
▌1. Hugh A. Butler (R)
▌2. Kenneth S. Wherry (R)

==== Nevada ====
▌1. George W. Malone (R)
▌3. Patrick A. McCarran (D)

==== New Hampshire ====
▌2. Styles Bridges (R)
▌3. Charles W. Tobey (R)

==== New Jersey ====
▌1. Howard Alexander Smith (R)
▌2. Albert W. Hawkes (R)

==== New Mexico ====
▌1. Dennis Chávez (D)
▌2. Carl Hatch (D)

==== New York ====
▌1. Irving Ives (R)
▌3. Robert F. Wagner (D)

==== North Carolina ====
▌2. William B. Umstead (D), until December 30, 1948

▌J. Melville Broughton (D), from December 31, 1948

▌3. Clyde R. Hoey (D)

==== North Dakota ====
▌1. William Langer (R-NPL)
▌3. Milton Young (R)

==== Ohio ====
▌1. John W. Bricker (R)
▌3. Robert A. Taft (R)

==== Oklahoma ====
▌2. Edward H. Moore (R)
▌3. Elmer Thomas (D)

==== Oregon ====
▌2. Guy Cordon (R)
▌3. Wayne Morse (R)

==== Pennsylvania ====
▌1. Edward Martin (R)
▌3. Francis J. Myers (D)

==== Rhode Island ====
▌1. J. Howard McGrath (D)
▌2. Theodore F. Green (D)

==== South Carolina ====
▌2. Burnet R. Maybank (D)
▌3. Olin D. Johnston (D)

==== South Dakota ====
▌2. Harlan J. Bushfield (R), until September 27, 1948

▌Vera C. Bushfield (R), October 6, 1948 – December 26, 1948
▌Karl E. Mundt (R), from December 31, 1948

▌3. John Chandler Gurney (R)

==== Tennessee ====
▌1. Kenneth McKellar (D)
▌2. Tom Stewart (D)

==== Texas ====
▌1. Tom T. Connally (D)
▌2. W. Lee O'Daniel (D)

==== Utah ====
▌1. Arthur Vivian Watkins (R)
▌3. Elbert D. Thomas (D)

==== Vermont ====
▌1. Ralph Flanders (R)
▌3. George Aiken (R)

==== Virginia ====
▌1. Harry F. Byrd (D)
▌2. A. Willis Robertson (D)

==== Washington ====
▌1. Harry P. Cain (R)
▌3. Warren G. Magnuson (D)

==== West Virginia ====
▌1. Harley M. Kilgore (D)
▌2. Chapman Revercomb (R)

==== Wisconsin ====
▌1. Joseph McCarthy (R)
▌3. Alexander Wiley (R)

==== Wyoming ====
▌1. Joseph C. O'Mahoney (D)
▌2. Edward V. Robertson (R)

Senators' party membership by state at the opening of the 80th Congress in January 1947 2 Democrats 1 Democrat and 1 Republican 2 Republicans

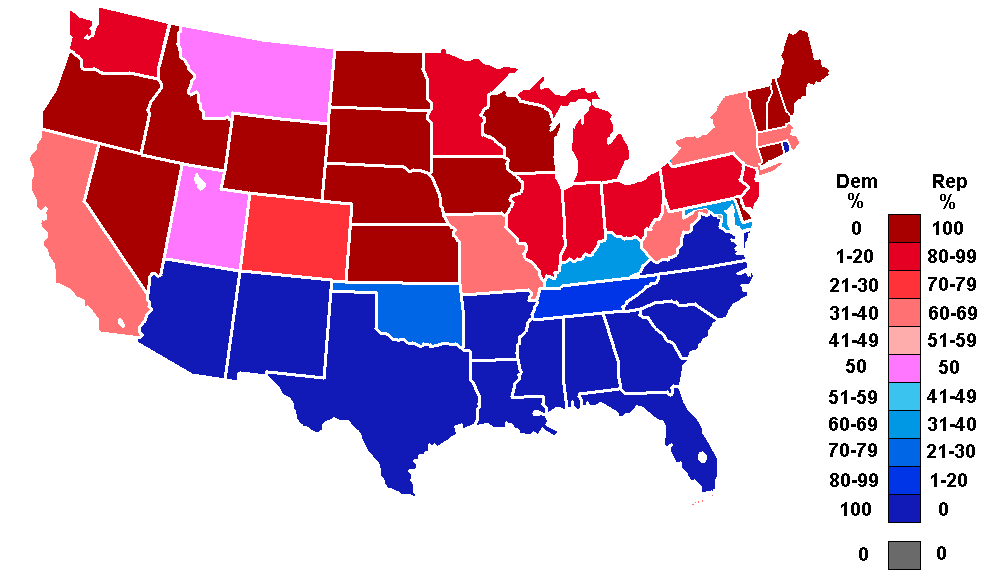
Percentage of members from each party by state at the opening of the 80th Congress, ranging from dark blue (most Democratic) to dark red (most Republican).

=== House of Representatives ===
The names of representatives elected statewide at-large, are preceded by an "At-large", and the names of those elected from districts, whether plural or single member, are preceded by their district numbers.

The congressional district numbers are linked to articles describing the district itself. Since the boundaries of the districts have changed often and substantially, the linked article may only describe the district as it exists today, and not as it was at the time of this Congress.

==== Alabama ====
▌1. Frank W. Boykin (D)
▌2. George M. Grant (D)
▌3. George W. Andrews (D)
▌4. Sam Hobbs (D)
▌5. Albert Rains (D)
▌6. Pete Jarman (D)
▌7. Carter Manasco (D)
▌8. Robert E. Jones Jr. (D), from January 28, 1947
▌9. Laurie C. Battle (D)

==== Arizona ====
▌At-large. John R. Murdock (D)
▌At-large. Richard F. Harless (D)

==== Arkansas ====
▌1. Ezekiel C. Gathings (D)
▌2. Wilbur Mills (D)
▌3. James William Trimble (D)
▌4. William Fadjo Cravens (D)
▌5. Brooks Hays (D)
▌6. William F. Norrell (D)
▌7. Oren Harris (D)

==== California ====
▌1. Clarence F. Lea (D)
▌2. Clair Engle (D)
▌3. J. Leroy Johnson (R)
▌4. Franck R. Havenner (D)
▌5. Richard J. Welch (R)
▌6. George P. Miller (D)
▌7. John J. Allen Jr. (R)
▌8. Jack Z. Anderson (R)
▌9. Bertrand W. Gearhart (R)
▌10. Alfred J. Elliott (D)
▌11. Ernest K. Bramblett (R)
▌12. Richard Nixon (R)
▌13. Norris Poulson (R)
▌14. Helen Gahagan Douglas (D)
▌15. Gordon L. McDonough (R)
▌16. Donald L. Jackson (R)
▌17. Cecil R. King (D)
▌18. Willis W. Bradley (R)
▌19. Chester E. Holifield (D)
▌20. John Carl Hinshaw (R)
▌21. Harry R. Sheppard (D)
▌22. John R. Phillips (R)
▌23. Charles K. Fletcher (R)

==== Colorado ====
▌1. John A. Carroll (D)
▌2. William S. Hill (R)
▌3. John Chenoweth (R)
▌4. Robert F. Rockwell (R)

==== Connecticut ====
▌1. William J. Miller (R)
▌2. Horace Seely-Brown Jr. (R)
▌3. Ellsworth Foote (R)
▌4. John Davis Lodge (R)
▌5. James T. Patterson (R)
▌At-large. Antoni Sadlak (R)

==== Delaware ====
▌At-large. J. Caleb Boggs (R)

==== Florida ====
▌1. J. Hardin Peterson (D)
▌2. Emory H. Price (D)
▌3. Robert L. F. Sikes (D)
▌4. George Smathers (D)
▌5. Joe Hendricks (D)
▌6. Dwight L. Rogers (D)

==== Georgia ====
▌1. Prince Hulon Preston Jr. (D)
▌2. Edward E. Cox (D)
▌3. Stephen Pace (D)
▌4. Albert Sidney Camp (D)
▌5. James C. Davis (D)
▌6. Carl Vinson (D)
▌7. Henderson Lovelace Lanham (D)
▌8. William McDonald Wheeler (D)
▌9. John S. Wood (D)
▌10. Paul Brown (D)

==== Idaho ====
▌1. Abe Goff (R)
▌2. John C. Sanborn (R)

==== Illinois ====
▌1. William L. Dawson (D)
▌2. Richard B. Vail (R)
▌3. Fred E. Busbey (R)
▌4. Martin Gorski (D)
▌5. Adolph J. Sabath (D)
▌6. Thomas J. O'Brien (D)
▌7. Thomas L. Owens (R), until June 7, 1948, vacant thereafter
▌8. Thomas S. Gordon (D)
▌9. Robert Twyman (R)
▌10. Ralph E. Church (R)
▌11. Chauncey W. Reed (R)
▌12. Noah M. Mason (R)
▌13. Leo E. Allen (R)
▌14. Anton J. Johnson (R)
▌15. Robert B. Chiperfield (R)
▌16. Everett M. Dirksen (R)
▌17. Leslie C. Arends (R)
▌18. Edward H. Jenison (R)
▌19. Rolla C. McMillen (R)
▌20. Sid Simpson (R)
▌21. George Evan Howell (R), until October 5, 1947, vacant thereafter
▌22. Melvin Price (D)
▌23. Charles W. Vursell (R)
▌24. Roy Clippinger (R)
▌25. C. W. Bishop (R)
▌At-large. William Stratton (R)

==== Indiana ====
▌1. Ray Madden (D)
▌2. Charles A. Halleck (R)
▌3. Robert A. Grant (R)
▌4. George W. Gillie (R)
▌5. Forest Harness (R)
▌6. Noble J. Johnson (R), until July 1, 1948, vacant for remainder of term
▌7. Gerald W. Landis (R)
▌8. E. A. Mitchell (R)
▌9. Earl Wilson (R)
▌10. Raymond S. Springer (R), until August 28, 1947

▌Ralph Harvey (R), from November 4, 1947

▌11. Louis Ludlow (D)

==== Iowa ====
▌1. Thomas E. Martin (R)
▌2. Henry O. Talle (R)
▌3. John W. Gwynne (R)
▌4. Karl M. LeCompte (R)
▌5. Paul H. Cunningham (R)
▌6. James I. Dolliver (R)
▌7. Ben F. Jensen (R)
▌8. Charles B. Hoeven (R)

==== Kansas ====
▌1. Albert M. Cole (R)
▌2. Errett P. Scrivner (R)
▌3. Herbert Alton Meyer (R)
▌4. Edward Herbert Rees (R)
▌5. Clifford R. Hope (R)
▌6. Wint Smith (R)

==== Kentucky ====
▌1. Noble J. Gregory (D)
▌2. Earle C. Clements (D), until January 6, 1948

▌John A. Whitaker (D), from April 17, 1948

▌3. Thruston Ballard Morton (R)
▌4. Frank Chelf (D)
▌5. Brent Spence (D)
▌6. Virgil Chapman (D)
▌7. Wendell H. Meade (R)
▌8. Joe B. Bates (D)
▌9. John M. Robsion (R), until February 17, 1948

▌William Lewis (R), from April 24, 1948

==== Louisiana ====
▌1. F. Edward Hébert (D)
▌2. Hale Boggs (D)
▌3. James R. Domengeaux (D)
▌4. Overton Brooks (D)
▌5. Otto Passman (D)
▌6. James H. Morrison (D)
▌7. Henry D. Larcade Jr. (D)
▌8. A. Leonard Allen (D)

==== Maine ====
▌1. Robert Hale (R)
▌2. Margaret Chase Smith (R)
▌3. Frank Fellows (R)

==== Maryland ====
▌1. Edward Tylor Miller (R)
▌2. Hugh Meade (D)
▌3. Thomas D'Alesandro Jr. (D), until May 16, 1947

▌3. Edward Garmatz (D), from July 15, 1947

▌4. George Hyde Fallon (D)
▌5. Lansdale G. Sasscer (D)
▌6. James Glenn Beall (R)

==== Massachusetts ====
▌1. John W. Heselton (R)
▌2. Charles Clason (R)
▌3. Philip J. Philbin (D)
▌4. Harold Donohue (D)
▌5. Edith Nourse Rogers (R)
▌6. George J. Bates (R)
▌7. Thomas J. Lane (D)
▌8. Angier Goodwin (R)
▌9. Charles L. Gifford (R), until August 23, 1947

▌9. Donald W. Nicholson (R), from November 18, 1947

▌10. Christian Herter (R)
▌11. John F. Kennedy (D)
▌12. John W. McCormack (D)
▌13. Richard B. Wigglesworth (R)
▌14. Joseph W. Martin Jr. (R)

==== Michigan ====
▌1. George G. Sadowski (D)
▌2. Earl C. Michener (R)
▌3. Paul W. Shafer (R)
▌4. Clare E. Hoffman (R)
▌5. Bartel J. Jonkman (R)
▌6. William W. Blackney (R)
▌7. Jesse P. Wolcott (R)
▌8. Fred L. Crawford (R)
▌9. Albert J. Engel (R)
▌10. Roy O. Woodruff (R)
▌11. Fred Bradley (R), until May 24, 1947

▌Charles E. Potter (R), from August 26, 1947

▌12. John B. Bennett (R)
▌13. Howard A. Coffin (R)
▌14. Harold F. Youngblood (R)
▌15. John Dingell Sr. (D)
▌16. John Lesinski Sr. (D)
▌17. George Anthony Dondero (R)

==== Minnesota ====
▌1. August H. Andresen (R)
▌2. Joseph P. O'Hara (R)
▌3. George MacKinnon (R)
▌4. Edward Devitt (R)
▌5. Walter Judd (R)
▌6. Harold Knutson (R)
▌7. Herman Carl Andersen (R)
▌8. John Blatnik (DFL) (Note: The Minnesota Democratic–Farmer–Labor Party (DFL) is the Minnesota affiliate of the U.S. Democratic Party and are counted as Democrats.), until August 13, 1946
▌9. Harold Hagen (R)

==== Mississippi ====
▌1. John E. Rankin (D)
▌2. Jamie L. Whitten (D)
▌3. William M. Whittington (D)
▌4. Thomas Abernethy (D)
▌5. W. Arthur Winstead (D)
▌6. William M. Colmer (D)
▌7. John Bell Williams (D)

==== Missouri ====
▌1. Samuel W. Arnold (R)
▌2. Max Schwabe (R)
▌3. William Clay Cole (R)
▌4. C. Jasper Bell (D)
▌5. Albert L. Reeves Jr. (R)
▌6. Marion T. Bennett (R)
▌7. Dewey Short (R)
▌8. Parke M. Banta (R)
▌9. Clarence Cannon (D)
▌10. Orville Zimmerman (D), until April 7, 1948

▌Paul C. Jones (D), from November 2, 1948

▌11. Claude I. Bakewell (R)
▌12. Walter C. Ploeser (R)
▌13. Frank M. Karsten (D)

==== Montana ====
▌1. Mike Mansfield (D)
▌2. Wesley A. D'Ewart (R)

==== Nebraska ====
▌1. Carl Curtis (R)
▌2. Howard Buffett (R)
▌3. Karl Stefan (R)
▌4. Arthur L. Miller (R)

==== Nevada ====
▌At-large. Charles H. Russell (R)

==== New Hampshire ====
▌1. Chester Earl Merrow (R)
▌2. Norris Cotton (R)

==== New Jersey ====
▌1. Charles A. Wolverton (R)
▌2. T. Millet Hand (R)
▌3. James C. Auchincloss (R)
▌4. Frank A. Mathews Jr. (R)
▌5. Charles A. Eaton (R)
▌6. Clifford P. Case (R)
▌7. J. Parnell Thomas (R)
▌8. Gordon Canfield (R)
▌9. Harry L. Towe (R)
▌10. Fred A. Hartley Jr. (R)
▌11. Frank Sundstrom (R)
▌12. Robert Kean (R)
▌13. Mary T. Norton (D)
▌14. Edward J. Hart (D)

==== New Mexico ====
▌At-large. Georgia Lee Lusk (D)
▌At-large. Antonio M. Fernández (D)

==== New York ====
▌1. W. Kingsland Macy (R)
▌2. Leonard W. Hall (R)
▌3. Henry J. Latham (R)
▌4. Gregory McMahon (R)
▌5. Robert Tripp Ross (R)
▌6. Robert Nodar Jr. (R)
▌7. John J. Delaney (D), until November 18, 1948

Vacant thereafter

▌8. Joseph L. Pfeifer (D)
▌9. Eugene J. Keogh (D)
▌10. Andrew L. Somers (D)
▌11. James J. Heffernan (D)
▌12. John J. Rooney (D)
▌13. Donald L. O'Toole (D)
▌14. Leo F. Rayfiel (D), until September 13, 1947

▌Abraham J. Multer (D), from November 4, 1947

▌15. Emanuel Celler (D)
▌16. Ellsworth B. Buck (R)
▌17. Frederic René Coudert Jr. (R)
▌18. Vito Marcantonio (AL)
▌19. Arthur George Klein (D)
▌20. Sol Bloom (D)
▌21. Jacob Javits (R)
▌22. Adam Clayton Powell Jr. (D)
▌23. Walter A. Lynch (D)
▌24. Benjamin J. Rabin (D), until December 31, 1947

▌Leo Isacson (AL), from February 17, 1948

▌25. Charles A. Buckley (D)
▌26. David M. Potts (R)
▌27. Ralph W. Gwinn (R)
▌28. Ralph A. Gamble (R)
▌29. Katharine St. George (R)
▌30. Jay Le Fevre (R)
▌31. Bernard W. Kearney (R)
▌32. William T. Byrne (D)
▌33. Dean P. Taylor (R)
▌34. Clarence E. Kilburn (R)
▌35. Hadwen C. Fuller (R)
▌36. R. Walter Riehlman (R)
▌37. Edwin Arthur Hall (R)
▌38. John Taber (R)
▌39. W. Sterling Cole (R)
▌40. Kenneth Keating (R)
▌41. James W. Wadsworth Jr. (R)
▌42. Walter G. Andrews (R)
▌43. Edward J. Elsaesser (R)
▌44. John Cornelius Butler (R)
▌45. Daniel A. Reed (R)

==== North Carolina ====
▌1. Herbert Covington Bonner (D)
▌2. John H. Kerr (D)
▌3. Graham A. Barden (D)
▌4. Harold D. Cooley (D)
▌5. John Hamlin Folger (D)
▌6. Carl T. Durham (D)
▌7. J. Bayard Clark (D)
▌8. Charles B. Deane (D)
▌9. Robert L. Doughton (D)
▌10. Hamilton C. Jones (D)
▌11. Alfred L. Bulwinkle (D)
▌12. Monroe Minor Redden (D)

==== North Dakota ====
▌At-large. William Lemke (R-NPL)
▌At-large. Charles R. Robertson (R)

==== Ohio ====
▌1. Charles H. Elston (R)
▌2. William E. Hess (R)
▌3. Raymond H. Burke (R)
▌4. Robert Franklin Jones (R), until September 2, 1947

▌William Moore McCulloch (R), from November 4, 1947

▌5. Cliff Clevenger (R)
▌6. Edward Oscar McCowen (R)
▌7. Clarence J. Brown (R)
▌8. Frederick Cleveland Smith (R)
▌9. Homer A. Ramey (R)
▌10. Thomas A. Jenkins (R)
▌11. Walter E. Brehm (R)
▌12. John M. Vorys (R)
▌13. Alvin F. Weichel (R)
▌14. Walter B. Huber (D)
▌15. Percy W. Griffiths (R)
▌16. Henderson H. Carson (R)
▌17. J. Harry McGregor (R)
▌18. Earl R. Lewis (R)
▌19. Michael J. Kirwan (D)
▌20. Michael A. Feighan (D)
▌21. Robert Crosser (D)
▌22. Frances P. Bolton (R)
▌At-large. George H. Bender (R)

==== Oklahoma ====
▌1. George B. Schwabe (R)
▌2. William G. Stigler (D)
▌3. Carl Albert (D)
▌4. Glen D. Johnson (D)
▌5. A. S. Mike Monroney (D)
▌6. Toby Morris (D)
▌7. Preston E. Peden (D)
▌8. Ross Rizley (R)

==== Oregon ====
▌1. A. Walter Norblad (R)
▌2. Lowell Stockman (R)
▌3. Homer D. Angell (R)
▌4. Harris Ellsworth (R)

==== Pennsylvania ====
▌1. James A. Gallagher (R)
▌2. Robert N. McGarvey (R)
▌3. Hardie Scott (R)
▌4. Franklin J. Maloney (R)
▌5. George W. Sarbacher Jr. (R)
▌6. Hugh Scott (R)
▌7. E. Wallace Chadwick (R)
▌8. Charles L. Gerlach (R), until May 5, 1947

▌Franklin H. Lichtenwalter (R), from September 9, 1947

▌9. Paul B. Dague (R)
▌10. James P. Scoblick (R)
▌11. Mitchell Jenkins (R)
▌12. Ivor D. Fenton (R)
▌13. Frederick Augustus Muhlenberg (R)
▌14. Wilson D. Gillette (R)
▌15. Robert F. Rich (R)
▌16. Samuel K. McConnell Jr. (R)
▌17. Richard M. Simpson (R)
▌18. John C. Kunkel (R)
▌19. Leon H. Gavin (R)
▌20. Francis E. Walter (D)
▌21. Chester H. Gross (R)
▌22. James E. Van Zandt (R)
▌23. William J. Crow (R)
▌24. Thomas E. Morgan (D)
▌25. Louis E. Graham (R)
▌26. Harve Tibbott (R)
▌27. Augustine B. Kelley (D)
▌28. Carroll D. Kearns (R)
▌29. John McDowell (R)
▌30. Robert J. Corbett (R)
▌31. James G. Fulton (R)
▌32. Herman P. Eberharter (D)
▌33. Frank Buchanan (D)

==== Rhode Island ====
▌1. Aime Forand (D)
▌2. John E. Fogarty (D)

==== South Carolina ====
▌1. L. Mendel Rivers (D)
▌2. John J. Riley (D)
▌3. William Jennings Bryan Dorn (D)
▌4. Joseph R. Bryson (D)
▌5. James P. Richards (D)
▌6. John L. McMillan (D)

==== South Dakota ====
▌1. Karl E. Mundt (R), until December 30, 1948, vacant thereafter
▌2. Francis H. Case (R)

==== Tennessee ====
▌1. Dayton E. Phillips (R)
▌2. John Jennings Jr. (R)
▌3. Estes Kefauver (D)
▌4. Albert Gore Sr. (D)
▌5. Joe L. Evins (D)
▌6. Percy Priest (D)
▌7. W. Wirt Courtney (D)
▌8. Tom J. Murray (D)
▌9. Jere Cooper (D)
▌10. Clifford Davis (D)

==== Texas ====
▌1. Wright Patman (D)
▌2. Jesse M. Combs (D)
▌3. Lindley Beckworth (D)
▌4. Sam Rayburn (D)
▌5. Joseph Franklin Wilson (D)
▌6. Olin E. Teague (D)
▌7. Tom Pickett (D)
▌8. Albert Thomas (D)
▌9. Joseph J. Mansfield (D), until July 12, 1947

▌Clark W. Thompson (D), from August 23, 1947

▌10. Lyndon B. Johnson (D)
▌11. William R. Poage (D)
▌12. Wingate H. Lucas (D)
▌13. Ed Gossett (D)
▌14. John E. Lyle Jr. (D)
▌15. Milton H. West (D), until October 28, 1948

▌Lloyd Bentsen (D), from December 4, 1948

▌16. R. Ewing Thomason (D), until July 31, 1947

▌Kenneth M. Regan (D), from August 23, 1947

▌17. Omar Burleson (D)
▌18. Eugene Worley (D)
▌19. George H. Mahon (D)
▌20. Paul J. Kilday (D)
▌21. O. C. Fisher (D)

==== Utah ====
▌1. Walter K. Granger (D)
▌2. William A. Dawson (R)

==== Vermont ====
▌At-large. Charles A. Plumley (R)

==== Virginia ====
▌1. S. Otis Bland (D)
▌2. Porter Hardy Jr. (D)
▌3. J. Vaughan Gary (D)
▌4. Patrick H. Drewry (D), until December 21, 1947

▌Watkins Moorman Abbitt (D), from February 17, 1948

▌5. Thomas B. Stanley (D)
▌6. J. Lindsay Almond (D), until April 17, 1948

▌Clarence G. Burton (D), from November 2, 1948

▌7. Burr Harrison (D)
▌8. Howard W. Smith (D)
▌9. John W. Flannagan Jr. (D)

==== Washington ====
▌1. Homer Jones (R)
▌2. Henry M. Jackson (D)
▌3. Fred B. Norman (R), until April 18, 1947

▌Russell V. Mack (R), from June 7, 1947

▌4. Hal Holmes (R)
▌5. Walt Horan (R)
▌6. Thor C. Tollefson (R)

==== West Virginia ====
▌1. Francis J. Love (R)
▌2. Melvin C. Snyder (R)
▌3. Edward G. Rohrbough (R)
▌4. Hubert S. Ellis (R)
▌5. John Kee (D)
▌6. E. H. Hedrick (D)

==== Wisconsin ====
▌1. Lawrence H. Smith (R)
▌2. Glenn Robert Davis (R), from April 22, 1947
▌3. William H. Stevenson (R)
▌4. John C. Brophy (R)
▌5. Charles J. Kersten (R)
▌6. Frank Bateman Keefe (R)
▌7. Reid F. Murray (R)
▌8. John W. Byrnes (R)
▌9. Merlin Hull (R)
▌10. Alvin O'Konski (R)

==== Wyoming ====
▌At-large. Frank A. Barrett (R)

==== Non-voting members ====
▌Alaska Territory. Bob Bartlett (D)
▌Hawaii Territory. Joseph Rider Farrington (R)
▌▌Puerto Rico. Antonio Fernós-Isern (PPD/D)

== Changes in membership ==
The count below reflects changes from the beginning of the first session of this Congress

=== Senate ===
There were three deaths, two resignations, and one lost mid-term election.

Senate changes
State (class)	Vacated by	Reason for change	Successor	Date of successor's formal installation (Note: When seated or oath administered, not necessarily when service began.)
Mississippi (1)	Theodore G. Bilbo (D)	Died August 21, 1947. However, since his seating was being contested at the start of this Congress over voter intimidation allegations, Bilbo was never seated this Congress. Successor was elected November 17, 1947.	John C. Stennis (D)	November 17, 1947
Louisiana (3)	John H. Overton (D)	Died May 14, 1948. Successor was appointed to continue the term.	William C. Feazel (D)	May 18, 1948
South Dakota (2)	Harlan J. Bushfield (R)	Died September 27, 1948. Successor was appointed to finish the term.	Vera C. Bushfield (R)	October 6, 1948
South Dakota (2)	Vera C. Bushfield (R)	Interim appointee resigned December 26, 1948. Successor was appointed to finish the term.	Karl E. Mundt (R)	December 31, 1948
Louisiana (3)	William C. Feazel (D)	Interim appointee retired when successor elected. Successor was elected December 31, 1948.	Russell B. Long (D)	December 31, 1948
North Carolina (2)	William B. Umstead (D)	Interim appointee lost election to finish the term. Successor was elected December 31, 1948.	J. Melville Broughton (D)	December 31, 1948

=== House of Representatives ===
There were nine deaths and seven resignations.

House changes
District	Vacated by	Reason for change	Successor	Date of successor's formal installation
Alabama; 8th	Vacant	John Sparkman resigned in previous Congress after being elected to the US Senate having been re-elected as well.	Robert E. Jones Jr. (D)	Seated January 28, 1947
Wisconsin; 2nd	Vacant	Representative Robert Kirkland Henry died during previous Congress having been previously re-elected.	Glenn Robert Davis (R)	Seated April 22, 1947
Washington; 3rd	Fred B. Norman (R)	Died April 18, 1947	Russell V. Mack (R)	Seated June 7, 1947
Pennsylvania; 8th	Charles L. Gerlach (R)	Died May 5, 1947	Franklin H. Lichtenwalter (R)	Seated September 9, 1947
Maryland; 3rd	Thomas D'Alesandro Jr. (D)	Resigned May 16, 1947, after being elected Mayor of Baltimore	Edward Garmatz (D)	Seated July 15, 1947
Michigan; 11th	Frederick Van Ness Bradley (R)	Died May 24, 1947	Charles E. Potter (R)	Seated August 26, 1947
Texas; 9th	Joseph J. Mansfield (D)	Died July 12, 1947	Clark W. Thompson (D)	Seated August 23, 1947
Texas; 16th	R. Ewing Thomason (D)	Resigned July 31, 1947, after being appointed as a judge of the US District Court for the Western District of Texas	Kenneth M. Regan (D)	Seated August 23, 1947
Massachusetts; 9th	Charles L. Gifford (R)	Died August 23, 1947	Donald W. Nicholson (R)	Seated November 18, 1947
Indiana; 10th	Raymond S. Springer (R)	Died August 28, 1947	Ralph Harvey (R)	Seated November 4, 1947
Ohio; 4th	Robert Franklin Jones (R)	Resigned September 2, 1947, to become a member of the Federal Communications Commission	William Moore McCulloch (R)	Seated November 4, 1947
New York; 14th	Leo F. Rayfiel (D)	Resigned September 13, 1947, having been appointed a judge of the United States District Court for the Eastern District of New York	Abraham J. Multer (D)	Seated November 4, 1947
Illinois; 21st	George Evan Howell (R)	Resigned October 5, 1947, after being appointed judge of the US Court of Claims	Vacant until next Congress	
Virginia; 4th	Patrick H. Drewry (D)	Died December 21, 1947	Watkins Moorman Abbitt (D)	Seated February 17, 1948
New York; 24th	Benjamin J. Rabin (D)	Resigned December 31, 1947	Leo Isacson (AL)	Seated February 17, 1948
Kentucky; 2nd	Earle Clements (D)	Resigned January 6, 1948, to become Governor of Kentucky	John A. Whitaker (D)	Seated April 17, 1948
Kentucky; 9th	John M. Robsion (R)	Died February 17, 1948	William Lewis (R)	Seated April 24, 1948
Missouri; 10th	Orville Zimmerman (D)	Died April 7, 1948	Paul C. Jones (D)	Seated November 2, 1948
Virginia; 6th	J. Lindsay Almond (D)	Resigned April 17, 1948, having been elected attorney General of Virginia	Clarence G. Burton (D)	Seated November 2, 1948
Illinois; 7th	Thomas L. Owens (R)	Died June 7, 1948	Vacant until next Congress	
Indiana; 6th	Noble J. Johnson (R)	Resigned July 1, 1948, after being appointed as judge of US Court of Customs & Patent Appeals	Vacant until next Congress	
Texas; 15th	Milton H. West (D)	Died October 28, 1948	Lloyd Bentsen (D)	Seated December 4, 1948
New York; 7th	John J. Delaney (D)	Died November 18, 1948	Vacant until next Congress	
South Dakota; 1st	Karl E. Mundt (R)	Resigned December 30, 1948, after being appointed to the U.S. Senate having already been elected.	Vacant until next Congress	

== Committees ==
Lists of committees and their party leaders for members of the House and Senate committees can be found through the Official Congressional Directory at the bottom of this article. The directory after the pages of terms of service lists committees of the Senate, House (Standing with Subcommittees, Select and Special) and Joint and, after that, House/Senate committee assignments. On the committees section of the House and Senate in the Official Congressional Directory, the committee's members on the first row on the left side shows the chairman of the committee and on the right side shows the ranking member of the committee.

=== Senate ===
- Agriculture and Forestry (Chairman: Arthur Capper; Ranking Member: Elmer Thomas)
- Appropriations (Chairman: Styles Bridges; Ranking Member: Kenneth McKellar)
- Armed Services (Chairman: Chan Gurney; Ranking Member: Millard E. Tydings)
- Banking and Currency (Chairman: Charles W. Tobey; Ranking Member: Robert F. Wagner)
- Civil Service (Chairman: William Langer; Ranking Member: Dennis Chavez)
- District of Columbia (Chairman: C. Douglass Buck; Ranking Member: N/A)
- Expenditures in Executive Departments (Chairman: George D. Aiken; Ranking Member: John L. McClellan)
- Finance (Chairman: Eugene D. Millikin; Ranking Member: Walter F. George)
- Foreign Relations (Chairman: Arthur H. Vandenberg; Ranking Member: Tom Connally)
- Interstate and Foreign Commerce (Chairman: Wallace H. White Jr.; Ranking Member: Edwin C. Johnson)
- Investigate the National Defense Program (Special) (Chairman: Owen Brewster)
- Judiciary (Chairman: Alexander Wiley; Ranking Member: Pat McCarran)
- Labor and Public Welfare (Chairman: Robert A. Taft; Ranking Member: Elbert D. Thomas)
- Petroleum Resources (Special)
- Public Lands (Chairman: Hugh A. Butler; Ranking Member: Carl A. Hatch)
- Public Works (Chairman: W. Chapman Revercomb; Ranking Member: John H. Overton)
- Remodeling the Senate Chamber (Special)
- Rules and Administration (Chairman: C. Wayland Brooks; Ranking Member: Carl Hayden)
- Small Business Enterprises (Special) (Chairman: Kenneth S. Wherry)
- Whole

=== House of Representatives ===
- Agriculture (Chairman: Clifford R. Hope; Ranking Member: John W. Flannagan Jr.)
- Appropriations (Chairman: John Taber; Ranking Member: Clarence Cannon)
- Armed Services (Chairman: Walter G. Andrews; Ranking Member: Carl Vinson)
- Banking and Currency (Chairman: Jesse P. Wolcott; Ranking Member: Brent Spence)
- District of Columbia (Chairman: Everett M. Dirksen; Ranking Member: John L. McMillan)
- Education and Labor (Chairman: Fred A. Hartley Jr.; Ranking Member: John Lesinski)
- Expenditures in the Executive Departments (Chairman: Clare E. Hoffman; Ranking Member: Carter Manasco)
- Foreign Affairs (Chairman: Charles Aubrey Eaton; Ranking Member: Sol Bloom)
- Foreign Aid (Select) (Chairman: Charles Aubrey Eaton)
- House Administration (Chairman: Karl M. LeCompte; Ranking Member: Mary Teresa Norton)
- Investigate Commodity Transactions (Select) (Chairman: August H. Andresen)
- Investigate Federal Communications Commission (Select) (Chairman: Forest A. Harness)
- Interstate and Foreign Commerce (Chairman: Charles A. Wolverton; Ranking Member: Clarence F. Lea)
- Judiciary (Chairman: Earl C. Michener; Ranking Member: Emanuel Celler)
- Merchant Marine and Fisheries (Chairman: Alvin F. Weichel; Ranking Member: S. Otis Bland)
- Newsprint and Paper Supply (Select) (Chairman: N/A; Ranking Member: N/A)
- Post Office and Civil Service (Chairman: Edward H. Rees; Ranking Member: Tom J. Murray)
- Public Lands (Chairman: Richard J. Welch; Ranking Member: Andrew L. Somers)
- Public Works (Chairman: George Anthony Dondero; Ranking Member: Joseph J. Mansfield then William M. Whittington)
- Rules (Chairman: Leo E. Allen; Ranking Member: Adolph J. Sabath)
- Small Business (Select) (Chairman: Walter C. Ploeser)
- Standards of Official Conduct
- Un-American Activities (Chairman: J. Parnell Thomas; Ranking Member: John S. Wood)
- Veterans' Affairs (Chairman: Edith Nourse Rogers; Ranking Member: John E. Rankin)
- Ways and Means (Chairman: Harold Knutson; Ranking Member: Robert L. Doughton)
- Whole

=== Joint committees ===
- Atomic Energy (Chairman: Sen. Bourke B. Hickenlooper; Vice Chairman: Rep. W. Sterling Cole)
- Conditions of Indian Tribes (Special)
- Economic (Chairman: Sen. Robert A. Taft; Vice Chairman: Rep. Jesse P. Wolcott)
- Disposition of Executive Papers
- Foreign Economic Cooperation
- Housing
- Labor Management Relations
- Legislative Budget
- The Library (Chairman: Sen. C. Wayland Brooks)
- To Study Pacific Islands
- Printing (Chairman: Sen. William E. Jenner; Vice Chairman: Rep. Karl M. LeCompte)
- Reduction of Nonessential Federal Expenditures (Chairman: Sen. Harry F. Byrd; Vice Chairman: Rep. Robert L. Doughton)
- Selective Service Deferments
- Taxation (Chairman: Rep. Harold Knutson; Vice Chairman: Sen. Eugene D. Millikin)

== Employees ==
=== Legislative branch agency directors ===
- Architect of the Capitol: David Lynn
- Attending Physician of the United States Congress: George Calver
- Comptroller General of the United States: Lindsay C. Warren
- Librarian of Congress: Luther H. Evans
- Public Printer of the United States: Augustus E. Giegengack, until 1948
  - John J. Deviny, from 1948

=== Senate ===
- Chaplain: Peter Marshall (Presbyterian)
- Parliamentarian: Charles Watkins
- Secretary: Carl A. Loeffler
- Librarian: George W. Straubinger
- Secretary for the Majority: J. Mark Trice
- Secretary for the Minority: Felton McLellan Johnston
- Sergeant at Arms: Edward F. McGinnis

=== House of Representatives ===
- Chaplain: James Shera Montgomery (Methodist)
- Clerk: John Andrews
- Doorkeeper: M. L. Meletio
- Parliamentarian: Lewis Deschler
- Postmaster: Frank W. Collier, until October 15, 1948; vacant thereafter
- Reading Clerks: George J. Maurer (D) and Alney E. Chaffee (R)
- Sergeant at Arms: William F. Russell

== See also ==
- 1946 United States elections (elections leading to this Congress)
  - 1946 United States Senate elections
  - 1946 United States House of Representatives elections
- 1948 United States elections (elections during this Congress, leading to the next Congress)
  - 1948 United States presidential election
  - 1948 United States Senate elections
  - 1948 United States House of Representatives elections
- Turnip Day Session (July–August 1948)
