= Mary Eugenia Benson Jobson =

American suffragist (1872–1962)

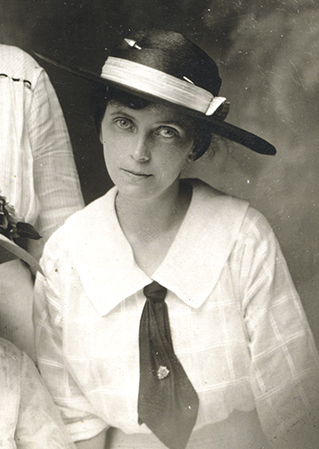
- Born: Mary Eugenia Benson; May 5, 1872; Columbus, Georgia, U.S.
- Died: January 10, 1962 (aged 89); Richmond, Virginia, U.S.
- Resting place: Forest Lawn Cemetery
- Occupation: Suffragist

Mary Eugenia Benson Jobson (May 5, 1872 – January 10, 1962) was an American suffragist and activist.

== Biography ==
Mary was born Mary Benson in Columbus, Georgia on May 5, 1872. The daughter of a rail yard master, much of Mary's early life history is not recorded. By 1889, she had moved to Richmond, Virginia and married Frank Lee Jobson, taking his last name.

In 1909, Mary joined the newly formed Equal Suffrage League of Virginia, an organization dedicated to raising support for women's suffrage. As part of her support for the organization, Jobson ran a booth at the state fair, distributed publications, and worked to establish the league in Virginia communities outside of Richmond. In addition, she canvassed members of the state assembly for support and gave speeches on the importance of the women's suffrage movement. She and other league members also polled people on if they supported suffrage, working to ensure that as many suffrage supporters were registered to vote as possible. During the 1910s, she also worked with suffrage movements in North Carolina and New York.

Following the passing and ratification of the Nineteenth Amendment, Jobson continued her activities. In 1920, she became a member of the Virginia League of Women Voters, again working extensively to ensure that to-be voters were properly registered. In 1921, she was appointed to the Richmond electoral board; according to one source, she was possibly the first woman in Virginia to be given such an appointment. Throughout the 1920s, Jobson became increasingly involved in local governance, notably working as a volunteer on several mayoral campaigns in Richmond. In 1924, she joined the newly established Richmond Department of Public Welfare, working with the department's social service bureau. She would continue working for the public welfare department into the 1930s, when the ongoing Great Depression greatly strained the city of Richmond's finances. In 1935, she clashed with mayor John Fulmer Bright, who opposed some of the extensive federal and state welfare programs proposed for Richmond; Bright eventually asked Jobson to resign her position, which she (after a public feud with the mayor) did in October 1935.

In addition to her work in government, Jobson was an active member of several women's clubs in Richmond. An adamant proponent of voting, in 1959 she stated that she had never skipped voting in an election. Jobson died of heart disease in her Richmond home on January 10, 1962. She was buried in Forest Lawn Cemetery.
