= 1957 Virginia gubernatorial election =

- November 5, 1957
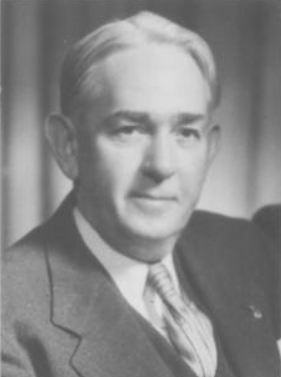

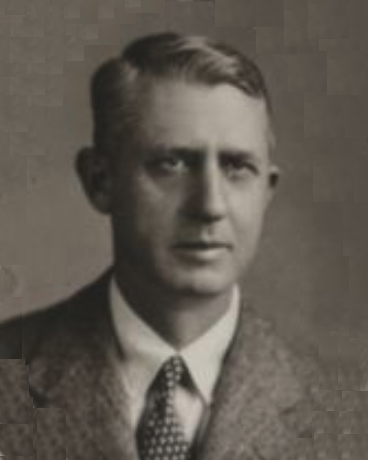
Nominee	J. Lindsay Almond	Ted Dalton
Party	Democratic	Republican
Popular vote	326,921	188,628
Percentage	63.16%	36.44%
- County and independent city results Almond: 40–50% 50–60% 60–70% 70–80% 80–90% >90% Dalton: 50–60% 60–70%
Governor before election
Thomas B. Stanley
Democratic
Elected Governor
J. Lindsay Almond
Democratic

In the 1957 Virginia gubernatorial election, incumbent Governor Thomas B. Stanley, a Democrat, was unable to seek re-election due to term limits. State Senator Theodore Roosevelt Dalton was again nominated by the Republican Party to run against former Democratic Attorney General J. Lindsay Almond.

As of 2025, this is the last occasion when Rockingham County or Shenandoah County voted Democratic for Governor.

== Background ==
The preceding election had seen Dalton receive 45 percent of Virginia's limited electorate, which was the most any GOP nominee had garnered since 1885 when large numbers of subsequently disenfranchised blacks and poor whites remained enfranchised. This alongside the election of three Representatives in 1952 produced expectations of a continued GOP rise in Virginia. As early as 1950, sitting Attorney-General Lindsay Almond had helped eight black students led by Irving Linwood Peddrew III integrate Virginia Polytechnic Institute, which suggested that the state would be able to navigate the emerging Civil Rights movement reasonably well.

=== Brown v. Board of Education ===
Governor Stanley did not wish to defy the federal courts against 1954's landmark Brown v. Board of Education. but did urge black leaders to not press for compliance. However, a year of black pressure caused the white masses to protest demanding that integration be resisted much more vigorously, something Senator Byrd and his ruling machine had always urged. Polls carried out by the state's highest-circulation newspaper, the Richmond Times-Dispatch, in 1956 showed that 92 percent of white Virginians supported segregation and only six percent opposed. A referendum in January 1956, in which turnout of registered voters was extremely low in the whitest parts of the state, voted 304 thousand to 144 thousand in favour of a constitutional convention (Note: This Convention would be known as the Commission on Constitutional Government (CCG).) with the explicit goal of maintaining segregated schools, and in August Stanley presented a package of legislation that mandated closing any public school under a Federal desegregation order, which passed the legislature under a tide of "segregationist emotionalism".

This severely divided and weakened the emerging Republican opposition to the Byrd Organization, and also progressive state Democrats. Virginia was one of seven states whose entire Congressional delegation had signed the "Southern Manifesto" in March. (Note: The others were Alabama, Arkansas, Georgia, Louisiana, Mississippi and South Carolina. Virginia was nonetheless unique among those states in having two Republicans in Richard H. Poff and Joel Broyhill sign the Manifesto.)

== Democratic nomination ==
=== Candidates ===
1957 Virginia Democratic gubernatorial primary
Party	Candidate	Votes	%	±%
Democratic	J. Lindsay Almond	119,307	79.48%	
Democratic	Howard H. Carwile	30,794	20.52%	
Majority		88,513	58.94%	
Turnout		150,101		
Democratic hold		Swing		

== General election ==
=== Campaign ===
Several members of the ruling Byrd Organization would contemplate running for Governor in the aftermath of the "Southern Manifesto", but by December it was clear that sitting Attorney General Almond would be the organization nominee. which under the extremely restricted Virginia electorate was tantamount to gaining the Democratic nomination, which Almond did by a four-to-one majority in the July primary. Unlike previous organization nominees, Almond had not been a favorite of Byrd especially given his past role in integrating Virginia Polytechnic, but sought the governorship for himself, in the process adopting Byrd's rigid segregationist views from the start of the campaign.

Dalton's 45 percent of the vote in 1953 remained viewed as extremely impressive, but he was reluctant before accepting the Republican nomination a second time.

School segregation was the solitary issue in the campaign, with Dalton proposing locally administered pupil assignment plans, (Note: These were already being tried in North Carolina at the time of the election.) emphasising the need to keep public schools open, and criticizing "Massive Resistance". Despite publicly expressing doubts about his campaign promises to prevent any integration whatsoever, Almond supported "Massive Resistance" and vigorously exploited the ongoing Little Rock Crisis to successfully argue that Dalton's policy would be certain to result in large-scale integration. When Almond improved upon Stanley's 1953 margin by sixteen percentage points, Senator Byrd, alongside the governor-elect, said that the election was a mandate

to defend and preserve the inherent powers of Virginia's sovereign statehood.

=== Predictions ===
Source	Ranking	As of
Ledger-Star	Certain D	September 30, 1957

=== Candidates ===
- J. Lindsay Almond, former Attorney General (Democratic)
- Theodore Roosevelt Dalton, State Senator from Radford (Republican)
- C. Gilmer Brooks, automobile salesman (Independent)

=== Results ===
1957 Virginia gubernatorial election
Party	Candidate	Votes	%	±%
Democratic	J. Lindsay Almond	326,921	63.16%	+8.33%
Republican	Theodore Roosevelt Dalton	188,628	36.44%	−7.84%
Independent	C. Gilmer Brooks	2,089	0.40%	
Majority		138,293	26.72%	+16.17%
Turnout		517,638		
Democratic hold		Swing		

==== Results by county or independent city ====
1957 Virginia gubernatorial election by county or independent city
	James Lindsay Almond Jr. Democratic		Theodore Roosevelt Dalton Republican		C. Gilmer Brooks Independent		Margin		Total votes cast
	#	%	#	%	#	%	#	%	Total votes cast
Accomack County	3,215	81.02%	741	18.67%	12	0.30%	2,474	62.35%	3,968
Albemarle County	2,065	68.13%	959	31.64%	7	0.23%	1,106	36.49%	3,031
Alleghany County	867	59.22%	592	40.44%	5	0.34%	275	18.78%	1,464
Amelia County	1,097	74.73%	366	24.93%	5	0.34%	731	49.80%	1,468
Amherst County	2,119	80.51%	504	19.15%	9	0.34%	1,615	61.36%	2,632
Appomattox County	1,776	87.70%	247	12.20%	2	0.10%	1,529	75.51%	2,025
Arlington County	12,368	46.84%	13,660	51.74%	375	1.42%	-1,292	-4.89%	26,403
Augusta County	2,106	57.23%	1,569	42.64%	5	0.14%	537	14.59%	3,680
Bath County	501	61.78%	307	37.85%	3	0.37%	194	23.92%	811
Bedford County	3,376	70.38%	1,413	29.46%	8	0.17%	1,963	40.92%	4,797
Bland County	731	49.49%	740	50.10%	6	0.41%	-9	-0.61%	1,477
Botetourt County	1,753	55.13%	1,421	44.69%	6	0.19%	332	10.44%	3,180
Brunswick County	2,508	84.84%	447	15.12%	1	0.03%	2,061	69.72%	2,956
Buchanan County	2,148	47.95%	2,297	51.27%	35	0.78%	-149	-3.33%	4,480
Buckingham County	1,190	81.06%	276	18.80%	2	0.14%	914	62.26%	1,468
Campbell County	3,276	77.78%	930	22.08%	6	0.14%	2,346	55.70%	4,212
Caroline County	1,399	70.66%	577	29.14%	4	0.20%	822	41.52%	1,980
Carroll County	1,514	33.72%	2,968	66.10%	8	0.18%	-1,454	-32.38%	4,490
Charles City County	295	36.51%	512	63.37%	1	0.12%	-217	-26.86%	808
Charlotte County	2,128	90.09%	232	9.82%	2	0.08%	1,896	80.27%	2,362
Chesterfield County	6,185	76.33%	1,900	23.45%	18	0.22%	4,285	52.88%	8,103
Clarke County	888	77.55%	255	22.27%	2	0.17%	633	55.28%	1,145
Craig County	517	65.11%	277	34.89%	0	0.00%	240	30.23%	794
Culpeper County	1,661	75.91%	517	23.63%	10	0.46%	1,144	52.29%	2,188
Cumberland County	888	77.69%	253	22.13%	2	0.17%	635	55.56%	1,143
Dickenson County	2,673	52.18%	2,428	47.39%	22	0.43%	245	4.78%	5,123
Dinwiddie County	1,773	83.75%	341	16.11%	3	0.14%	1,432	67.64%	2,117
Essex County	692	76.04%	216	23.74%	2	0.22%	476	52.31%	910
Fairfax County	10,948	46.25%	12,538	52.97%	184	0.78%	-1,590	-6.72%	23,670
Fauquier County	2,148	73.61%	767	26.29%	3	0.10%	1,381	47.33%	2,918
Floyd County	774	37.52%	1,289	62.48%	0	0.00%	-515	-24.96%	2,063
Fluvanna County	786	73.94%	273	25.68%	4	0.38%	513	48.26%	1,063
Franklin County	2,324	67.64%	1,107	32.22%	5	0.15%	1,217	35.42%	3,436
Frederick County	1,569	70.96%	613	27.73%	29	1.31%	956	43.24%	2,211
Giles County	1,871	54.44%	1,526	44.40%	40	1.16%	345	10.04%	3,437
Gloucester County	1,456	73.54%	522	26.36%	2	0.10%	934	47.17%	1,980
Goochland County	989	75.09%	323	24.53%	5	0.38%	666	50.57%	1,317
Grayson County	2,470	44.28%	3,087	55.34%	21	0.38%	-617	-11.06%	5,578
Greene County	276	56.67%	211	43.33%	0	0.00%	65	13.35%	487
Greensville County	1,935	81.30%	433	18.19%	12	0.50%	1,502	63.11%	2,380
Halifax County	4,303	86.51%	658	13.23%	13	0.26%	3,645	73.28%	4,974
Hanover County	2,733	75.90%	857	23.80%	11	0.31%	1,876	52.10%	3,601
Henrico County	10,736	76.86%	3,211	22.99%	21	0.15%	7,525	53.87%	13,968
Henry County	2,722	70.89%	1,108	28.85%	10	0.26%	1,614	42.03%	3,840
Highland County	430	58.90%	298	40.82%	2	0.27%	132	18.08%	730
Isle of Wight County	1,974	75.14%	641	24.40%	12	0.46%	1,333	50.74%	2,627
James City County	611	63.05%	357	36.84%	1	0.10%	254	26.21%	969
King and Queen County	599	71.82%	227	27.22%	8	0.96%	372	44.60%	834
King George County	655	67.81%	304	31.47%	7	0.72%	351	36.34%	966
King William County	861	73.46%	310	26.45%	1	0.09%	551	47.01%	1,172
Lancaster County	1,062	69.78%	453	29.76%	7	0.46%	609	40.01%	1,522
Lee County	3,693	53.96%	3,110	45.44%	41	0.60%	583	8.52%	6,844
Loudoun County	2,439	70.29%	1,012	29.16%	19	0.55%	1,427	41.12%	3,470
Louisa County	1,656	76.74%	491	22.75%	11	0.51%	1,165	53.99%	2,158
Lunenburg County	2,117	90.86%	211	9.06%	2	0.09%	1,906	81.80%	2,330
Madison County	807	71.61%	319	28.31%	1	0.09%	488	43.30%	1,127
Mathews County	894	71.86%	346	27.81%	4	0.32%	548	44.05%	1,244
Mecklenburg County	3,513	88.20%	460	11.55%	10	0.25%	3,053	76.65%	3,983
Middlesex County	887	74.85%	294	24.81%	4	0.34%	593	50.04%	1,185
Montgomery County	2,190	40.61%	3,192	59.19%	11	0.20%	-1,002	-18.58%	5,393
Nansemond County	2,601	65.50%	1,358	34.20%	12	0.30%	1,243	31.30%	3,971
Nelson County	1,295	83.07%	262	16.81%	2	0.13%	1,033	66.26%	1,559
New Kent County	511	67.50%	242	31.97%	4	0.53%	269	35.54%	757
Norfolk County	6,215	77.30%	1,803	22.43%	22	0.27%	4,412	54.88%	8,040
Northampton County	1,618	82.59%	340	17.36%	1	0.05%	1,278	65.24%	1,959
Northumberland County	1,194	74.30%	407	25.33%	6	0.37%	787	48.97%	1,607
Nottoway County	2,453	84.67%	438	15.12%	6	0.21%	2,015	69.55%	2,897
Orange County	1,598	77.61%	453	22.00%	8	0.39%	1,145	55.61%	2,059
Page County	1,944	56.71%	1,458	42.53%	26	0.76%	486	14.18%	3,428
Patrick County	1,841	80.25%	450	19.62%	3	0.13%	1,391	60.64%	2,294
Pittsylvania County	5,570	87.30%	785	12.30%	25	0.39%	4,785	75.00%	6,380
Powhatan County	756	66.14%	385	33.68%	2	0.17%	371	32.46%	1,143
Prince Edward County	2,344	83.36%	463	16.47%	5	0.18%	1,881	66.89%	2,812
Prince George County	870	76.12%	270	23.62%	3	0.26%	600	52.49%	1,143
Prince William County	2,036	70.67%	829	28.77%	16	0.56%	1,207	41.90%	2,881
Princess Anne County	4,915	73.33%	1,776	26.50%	12	0.18%	3,139	46.83%	6,703
Pulaski County	2,099	47.33%	2,330	52.54%	6	0.14%	-231	-5.21%	4,435
Rappahannock County	604	75.41%	196	24.47%	1	0.12%	408	50.94%	801
Richmond County	646	74.86%	215	24.91%	2	0.23%	431	49.94%	863
Roanoke County	4,219	53.16%	3,706	46.69%	12	0.15%	513	6.46%	7,937
Rockbridge County	1,343	52.83%	1,195	47.01%	4	0.16%	148	5.82%	2,542
Rockingham County	2,084	51.22%	1,960	48.17%	25	0.61%	124	3.05%	4,069
Russell County	2,666	51.28%	2,515	48.37%	18	0.35%	151	2.90%	5,199
Scott County	2,436	38.87%	3,804	60.70%	27	0.43%	-1,368	-21.83%	6,267
Shenandoah County	2,318	49.99%	2,308	49.77%	11	0.24%	10	0.22%	4,637
Smyth County	2,268	43.14%	2,978	56.65%	11	0.21%	-710	-13.51%	5,257
Southampton County	2,711	80.80%	632	18.84%	12	0.36%	2,079	61.97%	3,355
Spotsylvania County	1,392	72.96%	510	26.73%	6	0.31%	882	46.23%	1,908
Stafford County	1,212	69.70%	519	29.84%	8	0.46%	693	39.85%	1,739
Surry County	977	74.18%	334	25.36%	6	0.46%	643	48.82%	1,317
Sussex County	1,619	82.48%	341	17.37%	3	0.15%	1,278	65.10%	1,963
Tazewell County	3,104	57.13%	2,303	42.39%	26	0.48%	801	14.74%	5,433
Warren County	1,649	65.41%	859	34.07%	13	0.52%	790	31.34%	2,521
Warwick County	5,013	68.90%	2,232	30.68%	31	0.43%	2,781	38.22%	7,276
Washington County	3,164	52.21%	2,875	47.44%	21	0.35%	289	4.77%	6,060
Westmoreland County	1,038	78.70%	279	21.15%	2	0.15%	759	57.54%	1,319
Wise County	5,024	67.24%	2,423	32.43%	25	0.33%	2,601	34.81%	7,472
Wythe County	1,866	48.11%	1,961	50.55%	52	1.34%	-95	-2.45%	3,879
York County	1,491	68.90%	656	30.31%	17	0.79%	835	38.59%	2,164
Alexandria City	5,081	56.58%	3,844	42.81%	55	0.61%	1,237	13.78%	8,980
Bristol City	1,385	65.27%	721	33.98%	16	0.75%	664	31.29%	2,122
Buena Vista City	527	67.13%	258	32.87%	0	0.00%	269	34.27%	785
Charlottesville City	2,839	61.28%	1,788	38.59%	6	0.13%	1,051	22.69%	4,633
Clifton Forge City	796	62.14%	484	37.78%	1	0.08%	312	24.36%	1,281
Colonial Heights City	1,322	89.32%	156	10.54%	2	0.14%	1,166	78.78%	1,480
Covington City	1,283	59.12%	883	40.69%	4	0.18%	400	18.43%	2,170
Danville City	4,215	80.56%	1,004	19.19%	13	0.25%	3,211	61.37%	5,232
Falls Church City	891	43.72%	1,129	55.40%	18	0.88%	-238	-11.68%	2,038
Fredericksburg City	1,414	62.98%	822	36.61%	9	0.40%	592	26.37%	2,245
Galax City	537	43.62%	690	56.05%	4	0.32%	-153	-12.43%	1,231
Hampton City	5,863	64.00%	3,273	35.73%	25	0.27%	2,590	28.27%	9,161
Harrisonburg City	2,084	51.22%	1,960	48.17%	25	0.61%	124	3.05%	4,069
Hopewell City	1,990	77.22%	581	22.55%	6	0.23%	1,409	54.68%	2,577
Lynchburg City	4,626	67.08%	2,262	32.80%	8	0.12%	2,364	34.28%	6,896
Martinsville City	1,774	60.77%	1,142	39.12%	3	0.10%	632	21.65%	2,919
Newport News City	3,146	55.92%	2,435	43.28%	45	0.80%	711	12.64%	5,626
Norfolk City	14,109	61.57%	8,741	38.14%	67	0.29%	5,368	23.42%	22,917
Norton City	535	59.25%	365	40.42%	3	0.33%	170	18.83%	903
Petersburg City	3,141	72.39%	1,186	27.33%	12	0.28%	1,955	45.06%	4,339
Portsmouth City	5,711	66.35%	2,862	33.25%	35	0.41%	2,849	33.10%	8,608
Radford City	1,079	38.54%	1,721	61.46%	0	0.00%	-642	-22.93%	2,800
Richmond City	21,177	64.45%	11,665	35.50%	15	0.05%	9,512	28.95%	32,857
Roanoke City	9,858	55.52%	7,866	44.30%	31	0.17%	1,992	11.22%	17,755
South Norfolk City	1,998	75.74%	629	23.84%	11	0.42%	1,369	51.90%	2,638
Staunton City	1,590	51.39%	1,495	48.32%	9	0.29%	95	3.07%	3,094
Suffolk City	1,677	72.01%	646	27.74%	6	0.26%	1,031	44.27%	2,329
Virginia Beach City	1,161	73.67%	412	26.14%	3	0.19%	749	47.53%	1,576
Waynesboro City	1,252	53.80%	1,067	45.85%	8	0.34%	185	7.95%	2,327
Williamsburg City	521	55.54%	410	43.71%	7	0.75%	111	11.83%	938
Winchester City	1,442	67.51%	670	31.37%	24	1.12%	772	36.14%	2,136
Totals	326,921	63.16%	188,628	36.44%	2,089	0.40%	138,293	26.72%	517,638

Counties and independent cities that flipped from Democratic to Republican

- Buchanan
- Charles City

Counties and independent cities that flipped from Republican to Democratic

- Alleghany
- Botetourt
- Giles
- Henrico
- James City
- Lee
- Roanoke
- Shenadoah
- Stafford
- Warwick
- Covington (independent city)
- Fredericksburg (independent city)
- Norfolk (independent city)
- Roanoke (independent city)
- Staunton (independent city)
- Warwick (independent city)
- Waynesboro (independent city)
