= Albertis Harrison =

American judge

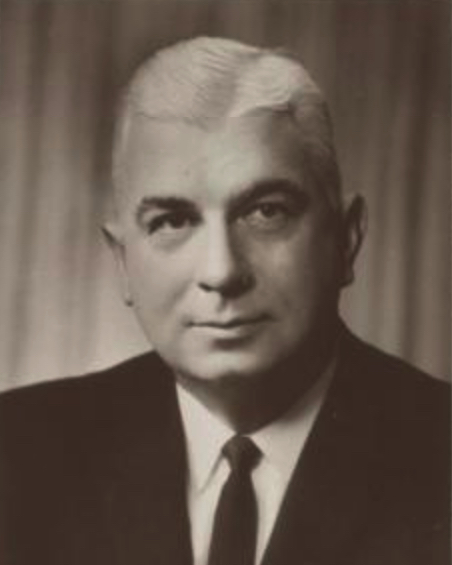

Justice of the Supreme Court of Virginia
- In office October 23, 1968 – December 31, 1981
- Preceded by: Claude V. Spratley
- Succeeded by: Charles S. Russell

59th Governor of Virginia
- In office January 13, 1962 – January 15, 1966
- Lieutenant: Mills Godwin
- Preceded by: J. Lindsay Almond
- Succeeded by: Mills Godwin

28th Attorney General of Virginia
- In office January 13, 1958 – April 20, 1961
- Governor: J. Lindsay Almond
- Preceded by: Kenneth Patty
- Succeeded by: Frederick T. Gray

Member of the Virginia Senate from the 7th district
- In office January 14, 1948 – January 8, 1958
- Preceded by: Y. Melvin Hodges
- Succeeded by: Joseph C. Hutcheson

Commonwealth's Attorney for Brunswick County
- In office January 1, 1932 – December 31, 1947
- Preceded by: B. W. Lewis
- Succeeded by: Joseph C. Hutcheson

Personal details
- Born: Albertis Sydney Harrison Jr. January 11, 1907 Alberta, Virginia, U.S.
- Died: January 23, 1995 (aged 88) Lawrenceville, Virginia, U.S.
- Resting place: Oakwood Cemetery, Lawrenceville
- Party: Democratic
- Spouse: Lacey Virginia Barkley (m. 1930)
- Children: 2
- Education: University of Virginia (LLB)
- Occupation: Lawyer; politician

Military service
- Branch/service: United States Navy; Naval Reserve
- Battles/wars: World War II; American theater

Albertis Sydney Harrison Jr. (January 11, 1907 – January 23, 1995) was an American politician and jurist. A member of the Democratic Party associated with Virginia's Byrd Organization, he served as the 59th governor of Virginia from 1962 to 1966.

Harrison is the first governor of Virginia to have been born in the 20th century.

== Early life and education ==
Harrison was born in Alberta, Virginia, the son of Albertis Sydney Harrison and Lizzie, (née Goodrich). He has been widely reported as related to Benjamin Harrison V who signed the Declaration of Independence and two United States presidents, William Henry Harrison and Benjamin Harrison, the 9th and 23rd Presidents, however before his death, he found this to be false.

He received a Bachelor of Laws degree from the University of Virginia Law School in 1928. Harrison married Lacey Virginia Barkley in 1930. They had two children: Antoinette H Jamison and Albertis S. Harrison III; and 6 grandchildren: Joseph D. Goodrich Harrison, Monica Harrison Kopf, Virginia Lacey Jamison, and James Carper Jamison II.

== Legal and political career ==
Harrison went into legal practice in Lawrenceville, Virginia, where he became town attorney, before being elected commonwealth's attorney of Brunswick County.

He was elected to the Senate of Virginia in 1947. He served there for ten years, before being elected Attorney General of Virginia in 1957.

Harrison resigned as attorney general in April 1961 to run for governor, winning election that November with 63.84% of the vote, defeating Republican H. Clyde Pearson. His administration increased educational financing for new schools and laboratories and raised teachers' pay. He promoted the development of state-supported colleges and technical schools as well as improved vocational training. He helped to modernize state banking laws to attract investment and accelerated highway construction.

He sat on the Virginia Supreme Court of Appeals, later renamed the Supreme Court of Virginia, from 1968 to 1981. In 1968 he chaired the Commission on Constitutional Revision that drafted the 1971 Constitution of Virginia.

=== Massive Resistance ===
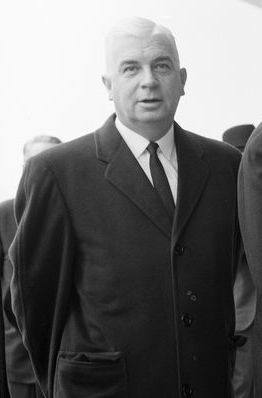
Harrison in 1962

As Attorney General, Harrison was responsible for defending the state's resistance to school integration, as part of the Massive Resistance strategy endorsed and led by the state's political leader, United States Senator Harry F. Byrd.

Part of Massive Resistance involved the closing of public schools in various Virginia cities and counties to prevent racially integrated classrooms. Davis v. County School Board of Prince Edward County (1952) was one of the companion cases to Brown v. Board of Education (1954), but the Supreme Court had left enforcement to the local federal district judge. Moreover, the Gray Commission of Byrd loyalists had recommended passage of various laws to avoid or delay integration. After opinions by the Virginia Supreme Court on January 19, 1959, as well as a three-judge federal panel overturned much of the new Virginia legislation, Governor J. Lindsay Almond (previously attorney general) and Harrison decided not to defy those courts and allowed schools in Arlington and Norfolk to reopen. However the schools in Prince Edward County closed in 1958 and did not reopen until 1963, as white students used tuition grants to attend a private segregation academy at state expense, while black students were left to volunteer efforts. Other problematic school closures, ultimately opened pursuant to federal court orders included those in Albemarle, Warren County and later New Kent County (the subject of the 1968 Supreme Court decision in Green v. County School Board of New Kent County (1968). Harrison told the board to comply unless they were willing to risk prosecution. By this time, he, like a number of other Byrd Democrats, had concluded that obstinate resistance to integration could not continue.

Another aspect of Massive Resistance involved new laws regulating attorney ethics, designed to attack practices of the NAACP, which was pursuing the desegregation actions. Initially, the U.S. Supreme Court deferred to an upcoming decision of the Virginia Supreme Court about those new ethics rules in Harrison v. NAACP (1959), but the case came before it twice more in NAACP v. Button (1963) (which was reargued after Harrison resigned as attorney general to run for governor, and which Virginia lost under attorney general Robert Young Button.

== Death ==
Harrison died of a heart attack at his home in Lawrenceville on January 23, 1995. He is buried in Oakwood Cemetery in Lawrenceville, Virginia.

The courthouse in Lawrenceville is named in his honor.

Senate of Virginia
Preceded by Y. Melvin Hodges	Member of the Virginia Senate from the 7th district 1948–1958	Succeeded by Joseph C. Hutcheson
Party political offices
Preceded by J. Lindsay Almond	Democratic nominee for Attorney General of Virginia; 1957	Succeeded by Robert Young Button
Preceded by J. Lindsay Almond	Democratic nominee for Governor of Virginia; 1961	Succeeded by Mills Godwin
Legal offices
Preceded by Kenneth Cartwright Patty	Attorney General of Virginia; 1958–1961	Succeeded by Frederick Thomas Gray
Political offices
Preceded by J. Lindsay Almond	Governor of Virginia; 1962–1966	Succeeded by Mills Godwin
