= Turnip Day Session =

1948 Special Session of U.S. Congress

The Turnip Day Session (or "Turnip Day" session) was a special session of the 80th Congress that began on July 26, 1948 and ended on August 3. President Harry Truman called Congress to convene on that date during his acceptance speech two weeks earlier during the 1948 Democratic National Convention.

The name is taken from an old Missouri saying, "On the twenty-sixth of July, sow your turnips, wet or dry." Truman chose the name because he was a Missouri native and had farmed his parents' land as a young man.

== Speech ==
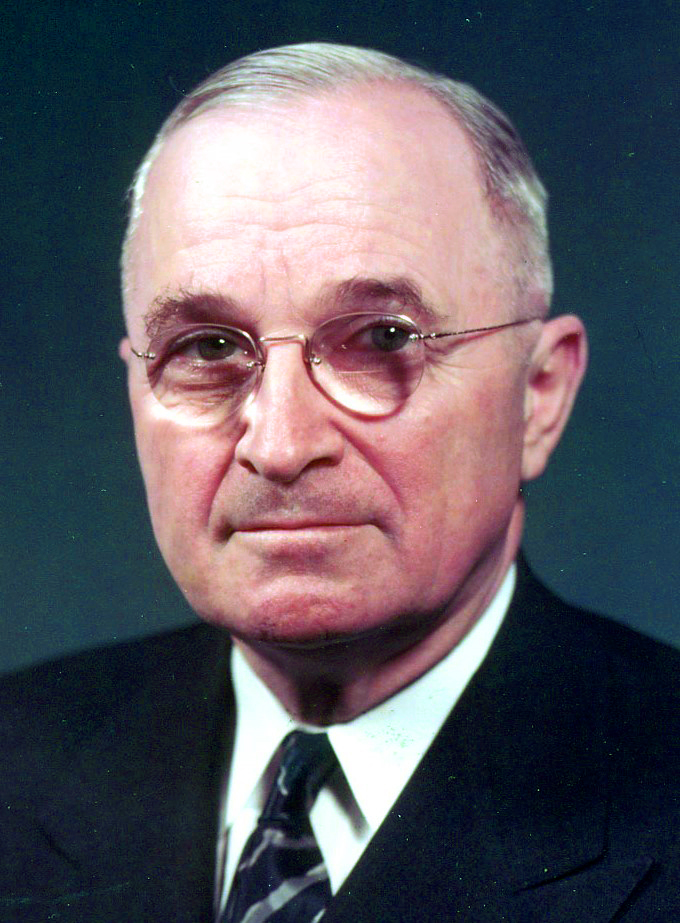
Harry S. Truman circa 1947

With fewer than four months remaining before the 1948 presidential election, Truman's public approval rating stood at only 36 percent. Two years earlier, Congress had been won by the Republican Party for the first time in 15 years. His opponent, Thomas Dewey, seemed to be planning his own move to the White House. In search of a bold political gesture, the president turned to Article II, Section 3, of the Constitution, which provides that the president "may, on extraordinary occasions, convene both Houses [of Congress], or either of them." On rare occasions, presidents have called both houses into a special session to deal with urgent matters of war and economic crisis.

On July 15, several weeks after the Republican-controlled US Congress had adjourned for the year and left much business unfinished, Truman took the unprecedented step of using his presidential nomination acceptance speech to call both houses back into session. He delivered the speech under trying circumstances. With no air conditioning, delegates sweltered in the Philadelphia convention hall's oven-like atmosphere. When Truman finally stepped before the cameras in the first televised Democratic convention in 1948, organizers had lost all hope of controlling the schedule.

At 1:45 a.m., speaking only from an outline, Truman quickly electrified the tired delegates. In announcing the special session, he challenged the Republican majority to live up to its own platform from its own recently concluded convention to pass laws to ensure civil rights, extend Social Security, and establish a national healthcare program. "They can do this job in fifteen days, if they want to do it." he challenged. The two-week session would begin on July 26, 1948, called "Turnip Day" in Missouri.

== Reaction ==
Republican senators reacted scornfully. To Arthur Vandenberg, it sounded like "a last hysterical gasp of an expiring administration." However, Vandenberg and other senior Senate Republicans urged action on a few measures to solidify certain vital voting blocs.

The chairman of the Republican Policy Committee, Robert A. Taft exclaimed, "No, we're not going to give that fellow anything!" Charging Truman with abuse of a presidential prerogative, Taft blocked all legislative action during the futile session. By doing so, Taft amplified Truman's case against the "Do-nothing Eightieth Congress" and arguably contributed to his November victory.

Michael Straight, of the left-leaning The New Republic, quoted the Republican candidate Thomas E. Dewey as calling Truman's special session "a frightful imposition." However, Straight called it "a stroke of bold and liberal leadership and a confident reassertion of the validity of American democracy." Straight cited three "key issues" on which the 80th Congress had "failed utterly": housing, inflation, and civil rights.

The right-leaning Time, which then had no bylines, cast doubt on Truman by leading its coverage with a question: "Was there really a pressing national emergency?" Time also noted that no U.S. president had recalled Congress during an election year since 1856, under Franklin Pierce. It quoted US Senator Styles Bridges as calling Truman a "petulant Ajax from the Ozarks."

== Outcome ==
After eleven days, Congress sent two bills to the President for signing. One bill was to curb inflation, and the other was to encourage housing starts. Truman signed both bills but called them "inadequate." The challenge energized Truman's Democratic supporters and put the Republican Party on the defensive.
