= Senator Hodge =

Senator Hodge may refer to:

- Derek Hodge (1941–2011), Senate of the U.S. Virgin Islands
- Frederick A. Hodge (1853–1922), Minnesota State Senate
- George Baird Hodge (1828–1892), Kentucky State Senate
- Mary Hodge (born 1946), Colorado State Senate
- Orlando J. Hodge (1828–1912), Connecticut State Senate

== See also ==
- Senator Hodges (disambiguation)
