= Greek and Turkish Assistance Act of 1947 =

- Long title: An Act To provide for assistance to Greece and Turkey
- Nicknames: Truman Doctrine
- Enacted by: the 80th United States Congress

Citations
- Public law: Pub. L. 80–75
- Statutes at Large: 61 Stat. 103

Codification
- Titles amended: 22

Legislative history
- Introduced in the Senate as S. 938 by Arthur Vandenberg; Committee consideration by Senate Foreign Relations; Passed the House on; Passed the Senate on; Signed into law by President Harry S. Truman on May 22, 1947

Major amendments
- Foreign Assistance Act of 1948

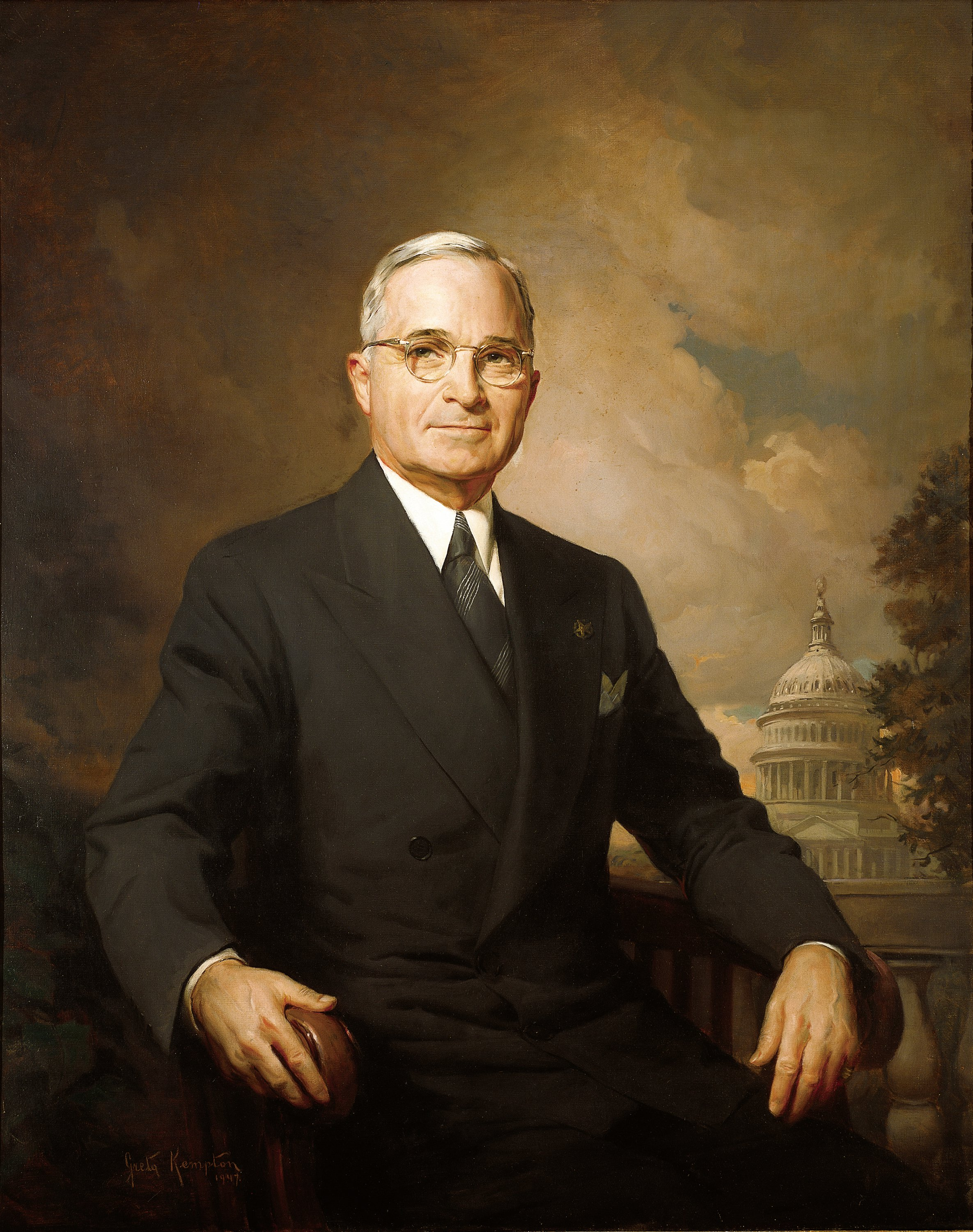
Harry Truman, President of the United States who advocated for the Greek and Turkish Assistance Act as part of the broader Truman Doctrine.

The Greek and Turkish Assistance Act was a bill enacted into law on May 22, 1947. This bill was introduced in the Senate by Senator Arthur Vandenberg of Michigan. This bill was the first of many foreign policy initiatives created through the Truman Doctrine, President Truman's foreign policy initiative introduced during the Cold War to combat Communism and the Soviet Union. The goal of the Greek and Turkish Assistance Act was to send aid to Greece and Turkey to help those countries fight back against the civil wars and Communist uprisings taking place in each country.

== Background ==
=== Truman Doctrine ===
The Greek and Turkish Assistance Act was the first major foreign policy action of the Truman Doctrine. After World War II, a power struggle emerged between the United States, who was trying to promote democracy around the world, and the Soviet Union, who advocated for Communist regimes. These conflicting ideologies led to proxy wars being fought between the US and the Soviet Union, known as the Cold War. In response to the Soviets, US President Harry Truman introduced the Truman Doctrine, a foreign policy initiative where the US would support democracies against Communist and authoritarian governments.

=== Greece and Turkey ===
After World War II, Greece and Turkey were both involved in Communist rebellions. Greece was in a civil war as Communist rebels were trying to overthrow the government, while Communist guerrillas were also threatening Turkey. Concerned by this, Senator Arthur Vandenberg introduced the Greek and Turkish Assistance Act, in order to provide aid to these countries and contain Communism in them.

== Provisions ==
The major provisions of the bill included giving financial, military, diplomatic, and humanitarian aid to Greece and Turkey. The sections of the bill centered around finances focused on how much money will be allocated to Greece and Turkey, how the money will be allocated to the countries, as well as if any money will be reimbursed to the US. Other provisions of the bill include the US getting more access into Greece and Turkey and giving the US President more influence over Greece and Turkey as a result of sending over the aid to these countries. These provisions also gave the US the ability to stop the aid if the US felt a reason to do so, as well as having spending reports being submitted to Congress.

== Legislative history ==
This bill was first introduced in the House of Representatives as HR 2616 on March 18, 1947, and then in the Senate as S 938 on March 19, 1947. This was debated in the Senate for a few weeks, before it was passed on April 22, 1947. It was then debated and passed in the House on May 9, 1947. The bill was then signed into law by President Harry Truman on May 22, 1947.

== Hearings ==
Despite the eventual passing of the Greek and Turkish Assistance Act, there were concerns regarding the bill. There were many debates in Congress about how much aid would be distributed, where it would go to, and possible repercussions of sending out aid. The first hearing took place on March 13, 1947. The introductory speech was given by President Harry Truman, as he was a supporter of giving aid to Greece and Turkey. The Senate Committee on Foreign Relations held the hearings. Testimony was heard from a variety of people, including Secretary of State Dean Acheson, Senator Joseph Ball, Secretary of the Navy James Forrestal, Senator Edwin Johnson, General George Lincoln, Ambassador to Greece Lincoln MacVeagh, Senator James Murray, Secretary of War James Patterson, Senator Claude Pepper, Chief of US Economic Mission to Greece Paul Porter, and US Ambassador to Turkey Edwin Wilson. All the testimonies were in agreement that Greece and Turkey should receive aid to fight the Communists, but the debates were surrounded around whether the aid should come from the US directly, or if it should be administered through the newly created United Nations. Senator Claude Pepper as one member who wanted the aid to go through the United Nations, while Senators Edwin Johnson and Senator James Murray introduced amendments also advocating for the same thing.

== Reception ==
The bill was received fairly positively by the public and politicians. It received mostly bipartisan support from members of Congress, and the opposition that did arise due to the bill regarded if the aid should be administered through the United Nations to Greece and Turkey, rather than directly from the US to Greece and Turkey. There were also some isolationist members of Congress who opposed the bill on the grounds that the US should not be trying to engage in another war after just coming out of World War II.
