= Kenneth Cartwright Patty =

American politician and lawyer (1891–1967)

27th Attorney General of Virginia
- In office September 1957 – January 1958
- Appointed by: Thomas B. Stanley
- Preceded by: J. Lindsay Almond
- Succeeded by: Albertis Harrison

Personal details
- Born: October 2, 1891 Parrottsville, Tennessee, U.S.
- Died: March 27, 1967 (aged 75) Richmond, Virginia, U.S.
- Resting place: Forest Lawn Cemetery; Richmond, Virginia, U.S.
- Party: Democratic
- Spouse: Ruth Lacy
- Children: 1
- Education: Washington and Lee Law School
- Occupation: Politician; lawyer

Kenneth Cartwright Patty (December 2, 1891 – March 27, 1967) was an American lawyer who served as the 27th Attorney General of Virginia. Patty was an assistant attorney general before Governor Thomas Stanley appointed him after the resignation of his boss, J. Lindsay Almond.

== Early life and education ==
Kenneth Cartwright Patty was born in Parrottsville, Tennessee, to Minnie (née Bushong) and William Monroe Petty. His father worked at Harned's Chapel. He had at least three sisters and two other brothers, including Graydon Patty who became a minister. At an early age, he moved to Tazewell County, Virginia. He attended a year and a half at Washington and Lee Law School before serving in World War I. He didn't finish college, but passed the bar.

== Career ==
Patty took up private practice as a lawyer and served as a mayor of Bluefield, Virginia.

In 1937, Patty joined the attorney general's office. He worked there as assistant attorney general and chief assistant to several attorneys general until his death, except for leaving for private practice for three years in 1951. For four months, from August 28, 1957, to January 11, 1958, Patty served as Attorney General of Virginia. He succeed J. Lindsay Almond, member of the Democratic political organization led by Senator Harry F. Byrd, who stepped down to run for Governor during the Massive Resistance crisis in Virginia. Patty's tenure at the position ended after the election of Albertis Harrison. Patty had an office at the state library building in Richmond.

== Personal life ==
Patty married Ruth Lacy, daughter of Virginia state senator James T. Lacy. They had one daughter, Mrs. Robert W. McClintock. He had diabetes.

Patty entered a hospital in Richmond for tests on March 16, 1967. He died days later on March 27. He was buried at Forest Lawn Cemetery.
