= Emek Sholom Holocaust Memorial Cemetery =

Historic cemetery in Virginia, United States

- U.S. National Register of Historic Places
- Virginia Landmarks Register
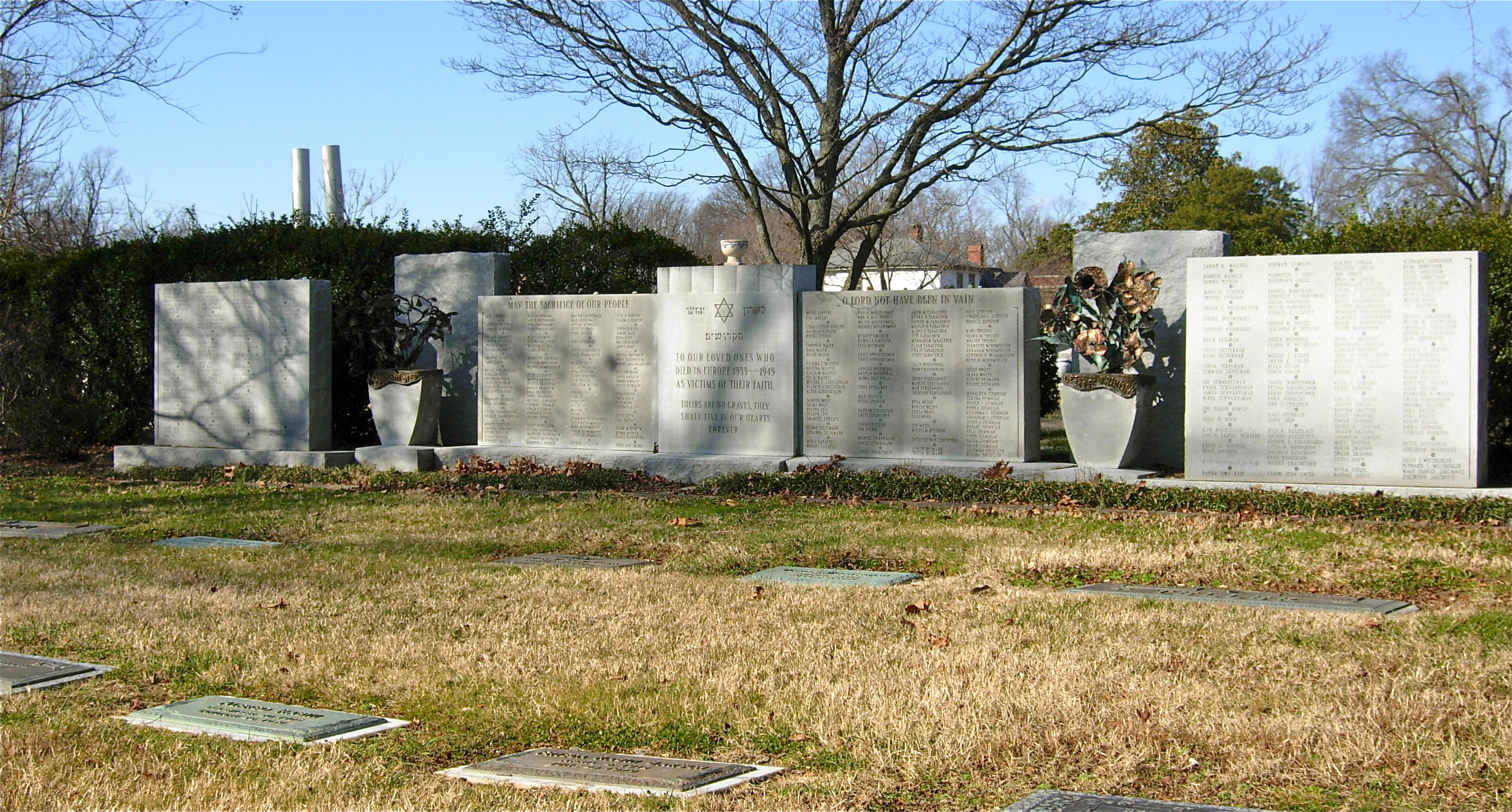

- Location within Virginia Location within the United States
- Nearest city: Richmond, Virginia
- Coordinates: 37°35′27″N 77°26′15″W
- Area: less than one acre
- Built: 1955
- Architectural style: Commemorative monument
- NRHP reference No.: 99000072
- VLR No.: 043-5006

Significant dates
- Added to NRHP: February 10, 1999
- Designated VLR: December 10, 1998

The Emek Sholom Holocaust Memorial Cemetery was built in 1955 and is located within Forest Lawn Cemetery in Richmond, Virginia. It was listed on the National Register of Historic Places in 1999. "Emek Sholom" translates into English as "Valley of Peace."

The Cemetery's website has their mission statement, brief history, photos, cemetery map, and hosts the annual "Never Again" Scholarship essays.
