= Senator Hodges =

Senator Hodges may refer to:

- Asa Hodges (1822–1900), Arkansas State Senate
- Charles D. Hodges (1810–1884), Illinois State Senate
- Charles E. Hodges (1892–1968), West Virginia State Senate
- George H. Hodges (1866–1947), Kansas State Senate
- George Tisdale Hodges (1789–1860), Vermont State Senate
- John O. Hodges (1831–1897), Kentucky State Senate
- Kaneaster Hodges Jr. (1938–2022), U.S. Senator from Arkansas
- W. Randolph Hodges (1914–2005), Florida State Senate
- William H. Hodges (1929–2017), Virginia State Senate
- Y. Melvin Hodges (1895–1973), Virginia State Senate

== See also ==
- Senator Hodge (disambiguation)
