= Ambrose O'Connell =

American judge (1881–1962)

Senior Judge of the United States Court of Customs and Patent Appeals
- In office April 10, 1962 – October 12, 1962

Associate Judge of the United States Court of Customs and Patent Appeals
- In office June 10, 1944 – April 10, 1962
- Appointed by: Franklin D. Roosevelt
- Preceded by: Irvine Lenroot
- Succeeded by: J. Lindsay Almond

Personal details
- Born: Ambrose O'Connell; July 9, 1881 Ottumwa, Iowa, U.S.
- Died: October 12, 1962 (aged 81) San Mateo, California, U.S.
- Party: Democratic
- Education: University of Notre Dame (Ph.B.); Columbia Law School (LL.B.)

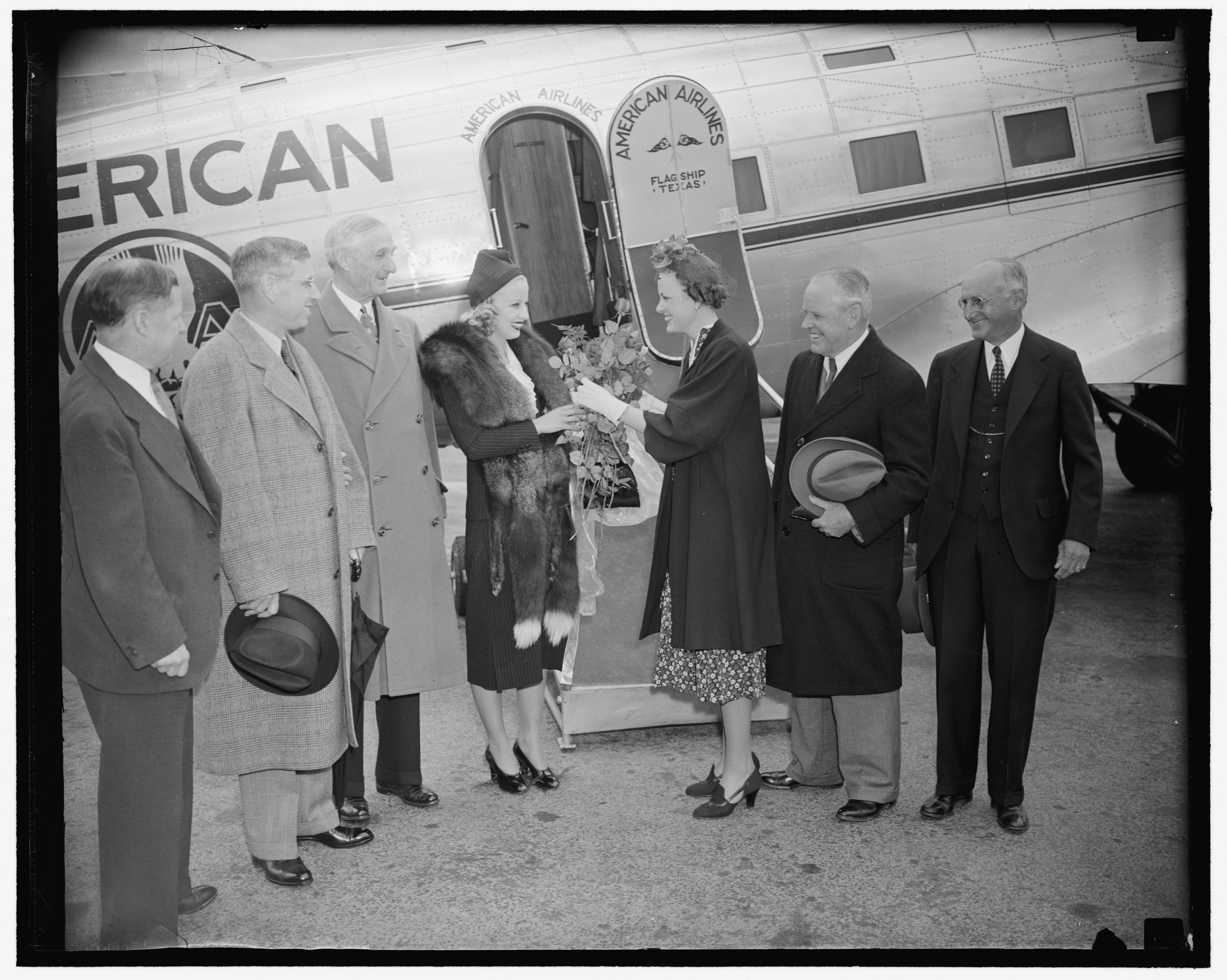
Ambrose O’Connell is the second from the right

Ambrose O'Connell (July 9, 1881 – October 12, 1962) was an associate judge of the United States Court of Customs and Patent Appeals.

== Education and career ==
Born on July 9, 1881, near Ottumwa, Iowa, O'Connell received a Bachelor of Philosophy degree in 1907 from the University of Notre Dame and a Bachelor of Laws in 1910 from Columbia Law School. He was an attorney for the Guarantee Trust Corporation in New York City, New York from 1928 to 1932. He was an assistant trust officer and office manager for the Democratic National Committee from 1932 to 1933. He was with the United States Post Office Department from 1933 to 1943, as a special assistant and executive assistant to United States Postmaster General James Farley from 1933 to 1939, as second assistant postmaster general from 1939 to 1940 and as first assistant postmaster general from 1940 to 1943. He was the Executive Vice-Chairman of the Democratic National Committee from 1943 to 1944.

== Federal judicial service ==
O'Connell was nominated by President Franklin D. Roosevelt on May 19, 1944, to an Associate Judge seat on the United States Court of Customs and Patent Appeals vacated by Associate Judge Irvine Lenroot. He was confirmed by the United States Senate on June 6, 1944, and received his commission on June 10, 1944. He assumed senior status on April 10, 1962. His service terminated on October 12, 1962, due to his death in San Mateo, California.

== Sources ==
- "O'Connell, Ambrose - Federal Judicial Center". www.fjc.gov.

Legal offices
Preceded by Irvine Lenroot	Associate Judge of the United States Court of Customs and Patent Appeals; 1944–1962	Succeeded by J. Lindsay Almond
