= Charlotte Williams Memorial Hospital =

Historic building in Richmond, Virginia, US

- U.S. National Register of Historic Places
- Virginia Landmarks Register
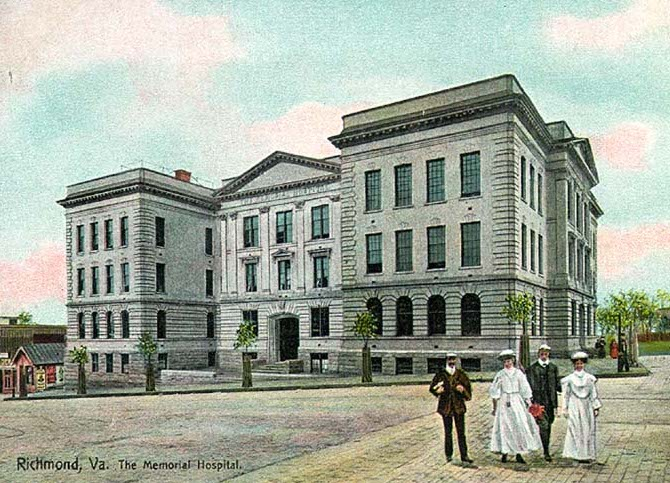
- Charlotte Williams Memorial Hospital

- Location within Virginia Location within the United States
- Location: 1201 E. Broad St., Richmond, Virginia
- Coordinates: 37°32′19″N 77°25′54″W
- Area: less than one acre
- Built: 1903
- Architect: Fuller & Pitcher; Ancarrow, Newton E.
- Architectural style: Renaissance
- NRHP reference No.: 04000269
- VLR No.: 127-0395

Significant dates
- Added to NRHP: April 9, 2004
- Designated VLR: June 15, 2003

Charlotte Williams Memorial Hospital, also known as Memorial Hospital, is a historic hospital building located in Richmond, Virginia. It was built between 1901 and 1903, and is a three-story, with basement, neo-Palladian Revival style building. It has an H-shaped plan, and has brick and granite walls, steel joists, steel elevators and masonry stairs. In 1986, the Virginia Department of Transportation acquired the hospital and rehabilitated it for office use.

It was listed on the National Register of Historic Places in 2004.
