= Y. Melvin Hodges =

American politician

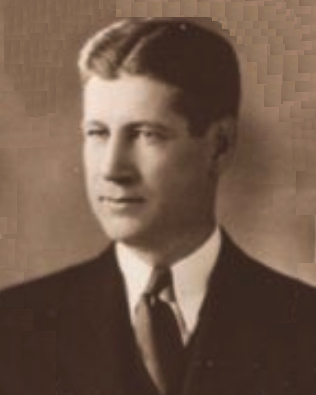

Member of the Virginia Senate from the 7th district
- In office January 12, 1944 – January 14, 1948
- Preceded by: Harvey B. Moseley
- Succeeded by: Albertis Harrison

Member of the Virginia House of Delegates from Mecklenburg County
- In office January 13, 1932 – January 12, 1938
- Preceded by: Robert L. Jeffreys
- Succeeded by: Benjamin R. Roberts

Personal details
- Born: Yewell Melvin Hodges; June 30, 1895 Sutherlin, Virginia, U.S.
- Died: April 8, 1973 (aged 77) South Hill, Virginia, U.S.
- Party: Democratic
- Spouses: Elizabeth Ellis Foster; Gladys Vivian Yancey
- Education: Richmond College

Military service
- Allegiance: United States
- Branch/service: United States Army
- Rank: Sergeant
- Battles/wars: World War I

Yewell Melvin Hodges (June 30, 1895 – April 8, 1973) was an American attorney and politician who served as a member of the Virginia Senate.

Senate of Virginia
Preceded by Harvey B. Moseley	Virginia Senator for the 7th District; 1944–1948	Succeeded by Albertis Harrison
