= Carl Julian Sanders =

American bishop

Carl Julian Sanders (1912–2007) was an American Bishop of the United Methodist Church who was elected to that office in 1972. At the time of his election, he was the only candidate for the Methodist episcopacy ever to have been elected on the first ballot in the history of the Southeastern Jurisdictional Conference.

== Birth and Family ==
Carl was born 18 May 1912 in Star, North Carolina. He married Eleanor Lupo in 1935, with whom he had two daughters, Lundi Martin and Eleanor Kasler. He had three grandchildren: Karen Kasler Wheeler, Kristen Kasler Peters and Kathleen Kasler O'Keefe. Eleanor died in 1995. Carl married Billie Jo Perry in 1997.

== Education ==
Carl earned the B.A. degree in 1933 from Wofford College. He then earned the B.D. degree in 1936 from Candler School of Theology.

== Ordained ministry ==
The Rev. Carl Julian Sanders entered the Upper South Carolina Annual Conference of the Methodist Episcopal Church, South in 1934. In 1935 he transferred to, and in 1938 was ordained an Elder in the Virginia Annual Conference. His first appointment was Cheriton Charge on the Eastern Shore; he served a variety of local church appointments through 1955. He then served (1955-71) as District Superintendent of three Districts in succession: Petersburg, Richmond, and Norfolk.

The Rev. Sanders served as a delegate to U.M. General and Jurisdictional Conferences between 1960 and 1972. He also was an accredited visitor to the first World Council of Churches assembly in Amsterdam in 1948.

== Episcopal ministry ==
The Rev. Carl Julian Sanders was elected to the Episcopacy in 1972 by the Southeastern Jurisdictional Conference of the United Methodist Church. He was assigned the Birmingham episcopal area, consisting of the State of Alabama and the northwest panhandle of Florida (the Alabama-West Florida and North Alabama Annual Conferences). He served there for eight years before retiring in 1980.

During his episcopacy he led the Alabama-West Florida Conference in financial campaigns for Huntingdon College and for Ministerial Pensions, and led the North Alabama Conference in financial campaigns for Birmingham–Southern College as well as Ministerial Pensions. He was the co-founder of the Alabama-West Florida U.M. Foundation in 1979, which at his death had accumulated assets of over $40 million.

Bishop Sanders served as Chairman of the Board of Trustees at Carraway Methodist Medical Center, member of the Board of Trustees of Athens College (now Athens State University), Birmingham-Southern and Huntingdon Colleges, too. Bishop Sanders also served as a Vice President of the U.M. General Board of Global Ministries (1972–76), and as President of the United Methodist Committee on Relief. He was also a member of the U.M. General Board of Higher Education and Ministry, and of the Division of Chaplains.

== Preacher and traveler ==
Bishop Sanders traveled extensively, visiting refugee camps and mission work in Africa, Asia and Europe, as well as a frequent visitor to the Middle East and the Far East. He was the co-founder of the Jerusalem Center for Biblical Studies for Educational Opportunities, Inc. of Lakeland, Florida, also serving on its Board of Directors (1976-2000). He served as a Lecturer for Educational Opportunities in England, Germany, Austria, Switzerland, Sweden, Alaska, and Jerusalem.

Bishop Sanders was also known as one of the greatest preachers in Methodism. He was awarded three Freedom Foundation Awards for his sermons: "One Nation Under God" in 1962, "Independence and Beyond" in 1977, and "In God We Trust - Do We or Don't We" in 1987. In 1980 he was chosen to give the opening sermon for the United Methodist General Conference. The same year he was chosen to deliver the sermon for the Consecration Service for newly elected Bishops at the Southeastern Jurisdictional Conference.

== Death and Burial ==
Bishop Carl Julian Sanders died 7 March 2007 at Fairhaven Hospital, Birmingham, Alabama after a brief illness. He was 94. He was survived by his wife; his two daughters, Lundi Martin and Eleanor Kasler; two stepdaughters, Elizabeth Perry and Judith Shipp; three grandchildren and three great-grandchildren; and one brother, Charles Sanders.

Bishop Sanders' funeral was held on 12 March 2007 at the Trinity U.M. Church, 903 Forest Ave., Richmond, Virginia. He was buried in Forest Lawn Cemetery in Richmond. A memorial service was held on 15 March 2007 at the First U. M. Church, 2416 W. Cloverdale Park, Montgomery, Alabama.

== See also ==
- List of bishops of the United Methodist Church
