= 1961 Virginia lieutenant gubernatorial election =

- November 7, 1961
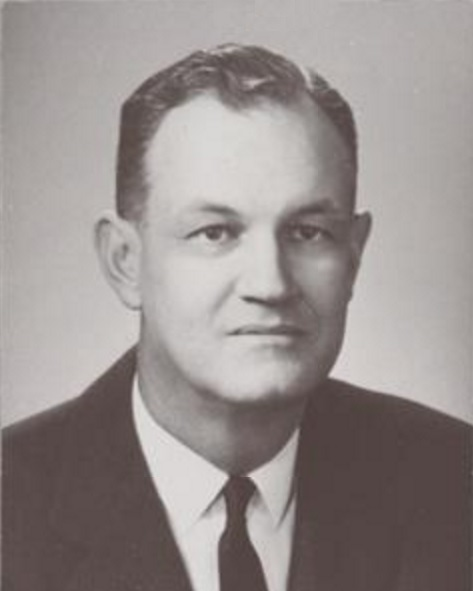

Nominee	Mills Godwin	Hazel K. Barger
Party	Democratic	Republican
Popular vote	251,223	131,437
Percentage	65.65%	34.35%
- County and independent city results Godwin: 50–60% 60–70% 70–80% 80–90% >90% Barger: 50–60% 60–70%
Lieutenant Governor before election
Allie Edward Stakes Stephens
Democratic
Elected Lieutenant Governor
Mills Godwin
Democratic

The 1961 Virginia lieutenant gubernatorial election was held on November 7, 1961, in order to elect the lieutenant governor of Virginia. Democratic nominee and incumbent member of the Virginia Senate Mills Godwin defeated Republican nominee Hazel K. Barger.

== General election ==
On election day, November 7, 1961, Democratic nominee Mills Godwin won the election by a margin of 119,786 votes against his opponent Republican nominee Hazel K. Barger, thereby retaining Democratic control over the office of lieutenant governor. Godwin was sworn in as the 28th lieutenant governor of Virginia on January 20, 1962.

=== Results ===
Virginia lieutenant gubernatorial election, 1961
Party	Candidate	Votes	%
Democratic	Mills Godwin	251,223	65.65
Republican	Hazel K. Barger	131,437	34.35
Total votes		384,660	100.00
Democratic hold			
