= Clarence G. Burton =

American politician

Member of the U.S. House of Representatives from Virginia's 6th district
- In office November 2, 1948 – January 3, 1953
- Preceded by: J. Lindsay Almond
- Succeeded by: Richard H. Poff

Personal details
- Born: December 14, 1886 Providence, Rhode Island, U.S.
- Died: January 18, 1982 (aged 95) Lynchburg, Virginia, U.S.
- Party: Democratic
- Education: Piedmont Business College
- Occupation: Businessman, politician

Clarence Godber Burton (December 14, 1886 – January 18, 1982) was a U.S. representative from Virginia.

== Biography ==
Born in Providence, Rhode Island, Burton moved was the son of Joseph Godber Burton and Annie Severn Burton. He moved with his parents to Lynchburg, Virginia, at an early age. He attended the public schools. He was graduated from Piedmont Business College, Lynchburg, Virginia. He engaged in the hosiery manufacturing industry, becoming treasurer of a firm in 1907 and president in 1921. He also engaged in cattle raising and banking. He served as member of the Lynchburg School Board 1938–1943, serving as vice chairman. He served as member of the Lynchburg City Council 1942–1948, serving as mayor 1946–1948.

Burton was elected as a Democrat to the Eightieth Congress on November 2, 1948, to fill the vacancy caused by the resignation of J. Lindsay Almond, and at the same time was elected to the Eighty-first Congress. He was reelected to the Eighty-second Congress and served from November 2, 1948, to January 3, 1953. He was an unsuccessful candidate for reelection in 1952 to the Eighty-third Congress. He served as chairman of board of Lynchburg Hosiery Mills, Inc.. He served as member of the Lynchburg Board of Zoning Appeals from 1957 to 1977. He served as director, American Federal Savings and Loan Association from 1924 to 1968, and chairman until 1980. Resided in Lynchburg, Virginia, until his death there on January 18, 1982. He was interred in Spring Hill Cemetery.

== Elections ==
- 1948; Burton was elected to the U.S. House of Representatives in a special election with 65.24% of the vote, defeating Republican John Strickler. He was simultaneously re-elected in the general election with 64.67% of the vote defeating Republican Strickler and Socialist J.B. Brayman.
- 1950; Burton was re-elected unopposed.
- 1952; Burton lost his re-election bid.

== Sources ==
- United States Congress. "Clarence G. Burton (id: B001148)". Biographical Directory of the United States Congress.

U.S. House of Representatives
Preceded by J. Lindsay Almond	Member of the U.S. House of Representatives from Virginia's 6th congressional district 1948–1953	Succeeded by Richard H. Poff
