= Joseph Collier Hutcheson =

American politician

Joseph C. Hutcheson

Member of the Virginia Senate from the 7th district
- In office January 8, 1958 – January 11, 1972
- Preceded by: Albertis Harrison
- Succeeded by: James T. Edmunds

Personal details
- Born: Joseph Collier Hutcheson; July 23, 1906 Boydton, Virginia, US
- Died: February 14, 1972 (aged 65) Lawrenceville, Virginia, US
- Party: Democratic
- Education: University of Virginia (BA, LLB)
- Occupation: Lawyer; politician

Military service
- Branch/service: United States Navy
- Battles/wars: World War II

Joseph Collier Hutcheson (July 23, 1906 – February 14, 1972) was a Virginia lawyer and member of the Virginia General Assembly representing Brunswick, Lunenburg and Mecklenburg Counties as a state Senator from 1958 until months before his death in 1972. A member of the Byrd Organization, Hutcheson opposed racial integration and was active in the Massive Resistance vowed by U.S. Senator Harry F. Byrd after the U.S. Supreme Court decisions in Brown v. Board of Education.

== Early and family life ==
Hutcheson was born in Boydton, Virginia to Herbert Farrar Hutcheson (1869-1934, the clerk of the Mecklenburg County and a former state delegate as well as farmer and justice of the peace) and his wife, the former Mary Young. Joseph was named after his grandfather, a substantial landowner and justice of the peace, but who failed his one attempt at election to the Virginia General Assembly. Three of his six brothers also became lawyers. After graduating from Boydton High School, Hutcheson attended the Virginia Episcopal School in Lynchburg, then went to the University of Virginia in Charlottesville. He received an undergraduate degree, then a law degree in 1930, having passed the Virginia bar exam the previous year. He never married.

Hutcheson served in the U.S. Navy in World War II, and then the U.S. Naval Reserve. One branch of the family moved to Houston, Texas after the American Civil War, so he is related to Judge Joseph Chappell Hutcheson.

== Political career ==
Upon returning from his wartime service, Hutcheson was elected mayor of Lawrenceville, Virginia, and served from September 1, 1946, until December 31, 1947. In 1947, he was elected Commonwealth's Attorney for Brunswick County, Virginia, and served for a decade, including a term as president of the Commonwealth's Attorney Association.

When Albertis Harrison was elected Attorney General, Hutcheson ran for the vacant seat and was elected and re-elected three times. This was a part-time position, and he also had a private legal practice with Larry N. Jones. However, his district's boundaries and number changed, both as a result of the Massive Resistance controversy engulfing Virginia, as well as reapportionments necessitated by census changes, the Voting Rights Act of 1965 and U.S. Supreme Court decisions (especially Davis v. Mann in 1963). In 1957 and 1961, District 7 encompassed Brunswick, Lunenburg and Mecklenburg Counties. For the 1965 election, the city of Petersburg, Virginia and Dinwiddie County were added to the district and Lunenberg county moved into the 4th senatorial district. Major restructuring after the 1970 census for the 1971 elections moved Petersburg into the 16th district and Dinwiddie county into the 15th district; Brunswick, Lunenburg, Mecklenburg counties were combined with Amelia, Cumberland, Powhatan and Chesterfield Counties as the 17th District. James T. Edmunds of Kenbridge, Virginia defeated him in the 1971 Democratic primary and ran unopposed in the general election, although later convicted of embezzlement and disbarred.

A member of the Byrd Organization, Hutcheson participated in Massive Resistance. He served on the Boatwright Committee that sought to sanction the NAACP for ethical violations, but continued to win re-election, unlike other committee members. When defeated for re-election, he was on the steering committee of the Democratic caucus, Chairman of the Senate Fish and Game Committee, and a high-ranking member of the committees on Courts of Justice, Education, Finance, Public Instruction, Nominations and Confirmations and Privileges and Elections committees.

== Death and legacy ==
Hutcheson died months after leaving his legislative office. His papers are held in the special collections division of the University of Virginia library.
