= The Trail of the Lonesome Pine =

The Trail of the Lonesome Pine may refer to:

- The Trail of the Lonesome Pine (novel), 1908, by John Fox Jr.
  - The Trail of the Lonesome Pine, a 1912 stage adaptation by Eugene Walter
  - "The Trail of the Lonesome Pine" (song), 1913
    - Trail of the Lonesome Pine, a Laurel and Hardy compilation album containing the song of the same name
  - The Trail of the Lonesome Pine (1916 film)
  - The Trail of the Lonesome Pine (1923 film)
  - The Trail of the Lonesome Pine (1936 film)
- Tennessee State Route 70, known as "The Trail of the Lonesome Pine"
- Virginia State Route 160, known as "The Trail of the Lonesome Pine"

== See also ==
- Lonesome Pine (disambiguation)
