= The Little Shepherd of Kingdom Come =

The Little Shepherd of Kingdom Come may refer to:

- The Little Shepherd of Kingdom Come (novel), 1903 novel by John Fox Jr.
  - The Little Shepherd of Kingdom Come (1920 film), a film adaptation of the novel
  - The Little Shepherd of Kingdom Come (1928 film), a film adaptation of the novel
  - The Little Shepherd of Kingdom Come (1961 film), a film adaptation of the novel
