= Big Stone Gap (film) =

- Theatrical release poster
- Directed by: Adriana Trigiani
- Written by: Adriana Trigiani
- Produced by: Donna Gigliotti; Adriana Trigiani; James Spies; J.E. Craig
- Starring: Ashley Judd; Patrick Wilson; Whoopi Goldberg; John Benjamin Hickey; Jane Krakowski; Anthony LaPaglia; Jenna Elfman
- Cinematography: Reynaldo Villalobos
- Edited by: Christopher Passig
- Music by: John Leventhal
- Production company: Altar Identity Studios
- Distributed by: Picturehouse
- Release dates: November 6, 2014 (Virginia Film Festival); October 9, 2015 (United States)
- Running time: 103 minutes
- Country: United States
- Language: English
- Box office: $1 million

Big Stone Gap is a 2014 American drama romantic comedy film written and directed by Adriana Trigiani and produced by Donna Gigliotti for Altar Identity Studios, a subsidiary of Media Society. Based on Trigiani's 2000 best-selling novel of the same name, the story is set in the actual Virginia town of Big Stone Gap circa 1970s. The film had its world premiere at the Virginia Film Festival on November 6, 2014. The film was released on October 9, 2015, by Picturehouse. The film was released in Blu-Ray by Universal Pictures Home Entertainment on February 2, 2016.

== Plot ==
In 1978, 40-year-old independent woman Ave Maria Mulligan owns her dead father's pharmacy in her hometown of Big Stone Gap, Virginia. Ave's mother, an immigrant from Italy, is the town seamstress. Ave is heavily involved in her community, home delivering medications to the country folk, volunteering on the coal mining town's Emergency Response Team, and directing the town's annual production of "Trail of the Lonesome Pine", based on the novel by John Fox Jr. Ave delivers medications to Nan McChesney and is pleased to see Nan's son Jack, a local coal miner and a former schoolmate. Jack tries to make small talk, but Ave leaves when Nan tells her that 40 is not too old to still have children.

Spec Broadwater, the town's lawyer and Ave's friend, brings news that her momma has died. At the graveside Fleeta Mullins, Ave's outspoken friend and pharmacy worker, chastises Ave for placing a rose on her father's grave, remarking how badly he had treated Ave.

Ave is shocked when her momma's will has a photo of her real father, who still lives in Italy. Her momma fled to America when she became pregnant. She met and married Fred Mulligan, who knew she was pregnant and never much liked Ave.

At the pharmacy, some popular teenage girl customers direct rude comments at Pearl Grimes, a poor teenager who is a Melungeon. Ave embarrasses the brats then offers Pearl a job at the pharmacy.

During the cast after-party for “Lonesome Pine”, it is announced that senatorial hopeful John Warner will make a campaign stop in town with his wife, Elizabeth Taylor, and Theodore will plan the event. He's so happy he kisses Ave in front of everyone then leads her away. They spend an awkward night together, with a stilted goodbye the next morning.

Ave helps deal with an explosion at the mine, worrying about Jack until finding him safe at the hospital. He accepts her offer of a lift home but Sweet Sue arrives and jumps into his arms, shrugging off Ave.

Ave stumbles across old love letters between her momma and her real father, causing Ave's best friend, town librarian and local romantic Iva Lou, to confront her about non-existent love life. Meanwhile, Jack's mother confronts him about Sweet Sue, whom she dislikes. Jack admits he wants the love that his parents had, does not love Sue but does care for her two young boys.

Jack finally approaches Ave. They take an evening walk and he tells her that he broke up with Sue, as he has always had a crush on the little Italian girl that sat beside him in elementary school. He tells her that they ought to get married. Ave storms off, offended that he doesn't even think she's worth being courted.

The day of the John Warner Campaign visit turns into chaos. Ms. Taylor chokes on a chicken bone while Ave learns that Jack got engaged to Sweet Sue. When Ave gets home from the campaign disaster, her father's sister (Aunt Alice) is waiting, calling Ave a bastard and announcing she is taking Ave to court for the house and the pharmacy.

Theodore tells Ave that he's been offered the band director's job at University of Tennessee and they should break up for multiple reasons. Ave quietly includes the fact that he likes men, to which he agrees.

Jack's mom confronts Ave, desperate for her help because Sweet Sue is planning on marrying Jack within weeks. Ave collapses, suffering a nervous breakdown.

Ave sleeps for days. In an act of desperation, Iva Lou has Pearl confront Jack, asking him to help bring Ave out of her sleep, telling him they are meant for each other. Late that night, Jack sneaks in and checks on Ave. He takes one of Ave's father's letters, kisses her on the forehead and leaves.

When Ave finally awakes, she announces that she saw her father in her dreams and she's got to go find him. Spec advises her to take everything out of her name so no one can take it away while she's gone.

Ave surprises Pearl and her mother, Leah Grimes, by selling Pearl the pharmacy for a dollar. Ave then gives Fleeta a huge raise, telling her how important she is to her and how important she will be in teaching Pearl to run the pharmacy.

Iva Lou announces that she is marrying her boyfriend, Lyle, and asks Ave to be her Maid of Honor. The couple are so drunk at the altar that Ave and Jack have to hold them up while the preacher quickly pronounces them married. Aunt Alice and Uncle Wayne barge into the reception, furious about the pharmacy and stating that Ave won't be giving away the family home. Ave then announces that she's giving Pearl the house too, which leads to Aunt Alice yelling racist comments about Pearl. The crowd chases Aunt Alice away, chimes in their dislike of her, many mentioning their own Melungeon blood.

Ave learns from Sweet Sue that she has reconciled with her husband during Ave's "mental collapse." Jack gives Ave a book about the town in the Italian Alps where her father lives.

Ave leaves her Cadillac in Aunt Alice's front yard, with a note and the keys.

Ave's last day in Big Stone Gap, Theodore takes her to the Outdoor Theater, where all her friends are gathered on stage. They surprise her with her poppa from Italy and then her momma's sister, Maria. Her poppa explains that Jack found them and paid for their flights, having sold his truck. Theodore has the theater choir sing a song with Aunt Maria, while Jack's voiceover explains that he and Ave married and had two children.

== Cast ==
- Ashley Judd as Ave Maria Mulligan
- Patrick Wilson as Jack MacChesney
- Whoopi Goldberg as Fleeta Mullins
- Judith Ivey as Nan MacChesney
- Angelina Fiordellisi as Fiammetta Mulligan
- John Benjamin Hickey as Theodore Tipton
- Paul Wilson as Lyle Makin
- Bridget Gabbe as Taylor Slagle
- Erika Coleman as Pearl Grimes
- Jenna Elfman as Iva Lou Wade
- Anthony LaPaglia as Spec Broadwater
- Jane Krakowski as Sweet Sue Tinsley
- Jasmine Guy as Leah Grimes
- Mary Pat Gleason as Alice Lambert
- Chris Sarandon as Mario Barbari
- James “Jimmy” Edward Mitchell Jr. as Bobby Dinsmore

== Release ==
The film had its world premiere at the Virginia Film Festival on October 6, 2014. on March 26, 2015, it was announced Picturehouse had acquired all distribution rights to the film. The film was released on October 9, 2015.

== Reception ==
Big Stone Gap has an approval rating of 35% "rotten" on review aggregator website Rotten Tomatoes, based on 20 reviews, and an average rating of 5.4/10.
