= John Fox Jr. House =

Historic house in Virginia, United States

- U.S. National Register of Historic Places
- Virginia Landmarks Register
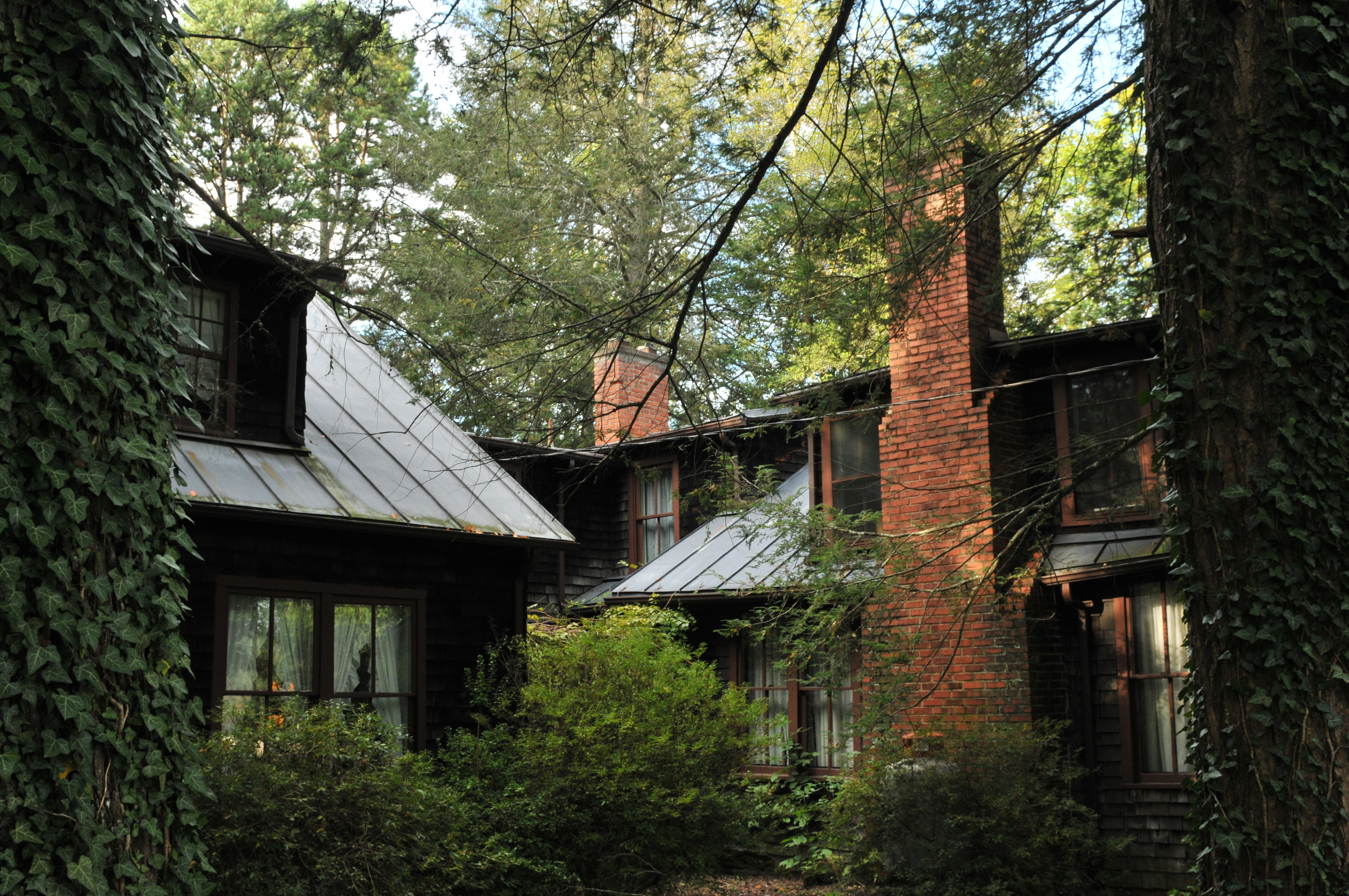
- John Fox Jr. House, September 2013

- Location within Virginia Location within the United States
- Location: 117 Shawnee Ave., Big Stone Gap, Virginia
- Coordinates: 36°51′57″N 82°46′42″W
- Area: less than one acre
- Built: 1890
- NRHP reference No.: 74002151
- VLR No.: 101-0001

Significant dates
- Added to NRHP: June 7, 1974
- Designated VLR: November 20, 1973

John Fox Jr. House, also known as the John Fox Jr. Museum, is a historic home located at Big Stone Gap, Wise County, Virginia. It is named for the American author John Fox Jr., who lived there from 1890 until 1919. A bestselling author, many of his stories were set in Appalachia and have been adapted to film and television.

== History ==
John Fox Jr. first visited the Cumberland Gap area while a student at Harvard College. His two older brothers, James and Horace, owned coal mines in Jellico, Tennessee, and the three came to the area as speculators and mineral developers in 1888. While exploring the area for business, John Fox became more and more fascinated with the region and its people, eventually abandoning his real estate interests for his writing. Works like The Trail of the Lonesome Pine and The Little Shepherd of Kingdom Come reflected both his interest as well as a general interest among American readers for the Appalachian people.

Despite his frequent travels, Fox had his productive writing period in the home on Shawnee Avenue and it is here that he wrote his most famous works. The original section of the Fox home was built in 1890, as a four-room cottage. The house was subsequently expanded to a two-story, 20 room dwelling. The frame dwelling sits on a stone foundation.

Fritzi Scheff, a singer with the Metropolitan Opera, was fascinated by the region through reading Fox's stories. After divorcing her husband, she married Fox and came to live in the home with him; the two became local celebrities. However, she was disappointed to find Appalachian life less exciting than she anticipated and the two divorced in 1913.

== House today ==
The house was opened as a museum in 1970. It is operated by the Lonesome Pine Arts and Crafts Association. The building was listed on the National Register of Historic Places in 1974. The property remains furnished the way it was during the time of the Fox family's residence there.
