= Adriana Trigiani =

American novelist

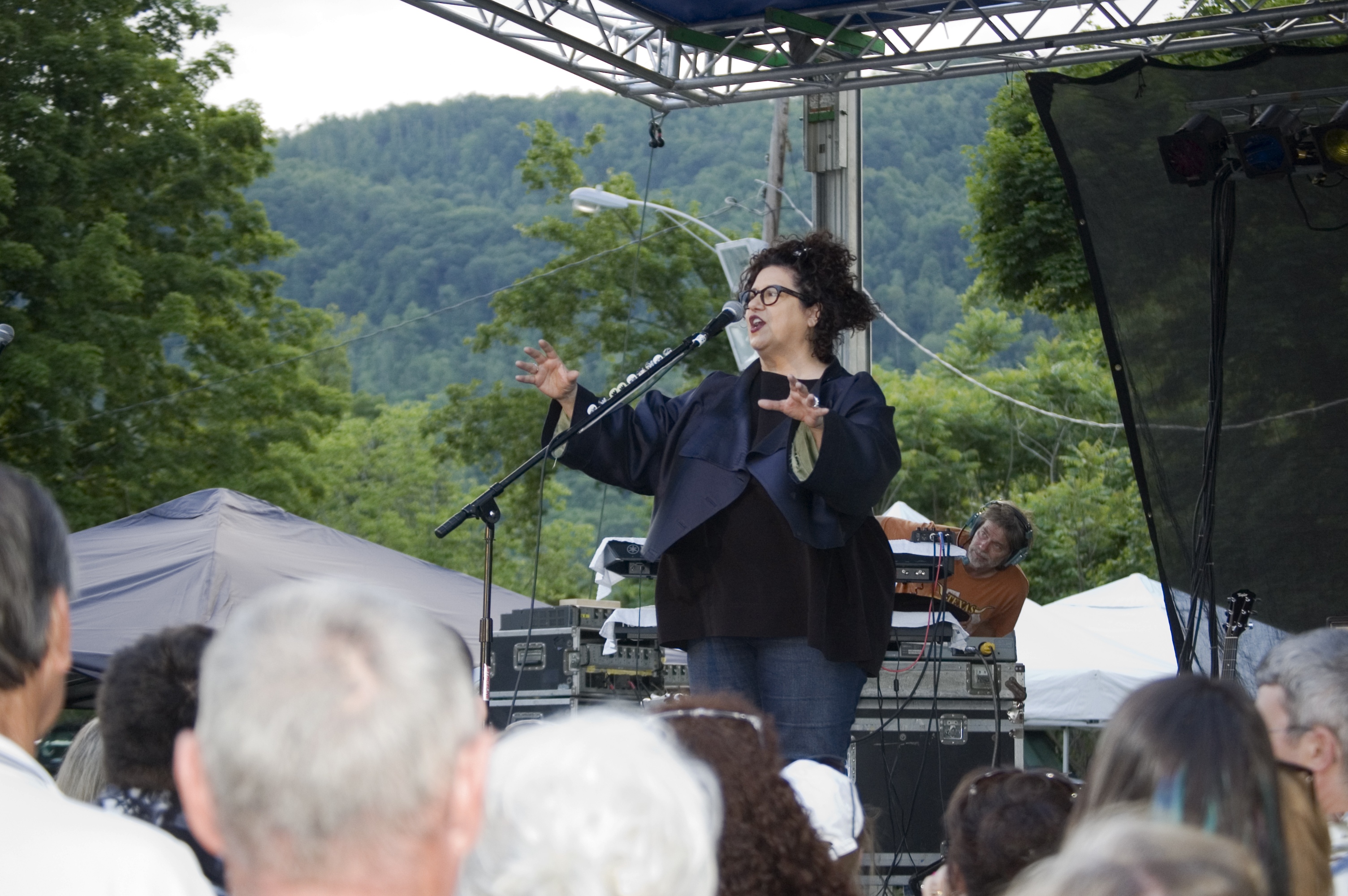
- Education: Saint Mary's College (BA)
- Occupations: Novelist; television writer; producer; film director
- Website: www.adrianatrigiani.com

Adriana Trigiani is an American author of eighteen books, playwright, television writer/producer, film director/screenwriter/producer, and entrepreneur based in New York City. Trigiani has published a novel a year since 2000.

== Early life and career ==
Trigiani graduated from Saint Mary's College in Indiana in 1981.

Inspired by her Italian American heritage and Appalachian childhood in Big Stone Gap, Virginia, Trigiani arrived in New York in 1985. Trigiani made her off-Broadway debut in New York City as a playwright in 1985 at the Manhattan Theater Club with Secrets of the Lava Lamp, directed by Stuart Ross. From 1988 to 1998, she created scripts for television sitcoms, including The Cosby Show (1984) and its spin-off A Different World (1987). She was the writer and executive producer of City Kids for ABC/Jim Henson Productions, she was an executive producer and writer of Growing Up Funny, a television special for Lifetime which garnered an Emmy nomination for Lily Tomlin. Trigiani has written eighteen best-sellers in fiction and non-fiction, wrote and directed the award-winning documentary Queens of the Big Time (1996 Audience Award Hamptons International Film Festival and 1997 Palm Springs International Film Festival). She wrote and directed the major motion picture Big Stone Gap, based on her debut novel and shot entirely on location in her hometown. In 2018, she directed Then Came You in Scotland, starring Craig Ferguson and Kathie Lee Gifford (screenwriter). She adapted her novel Very Valentine for Lifetime Television, it premiered in June 2019 starring Kelen Coleman and Jacqueline Bisset. Trigiani co-founded with Nancy Bolmeier-Fisher The Origin Project, an in-school writing program in Appalachia that serves over 1,700 students in her home state Virginia. The program has received many awards, including citations from the Virginia Council for the Humanities (2018), Helen M. Lewis Community Service Award (2015), and the William P. Kanto Memorial Award at The University of Virginia at Wise (2017).

== As novelist and filmmaker ==
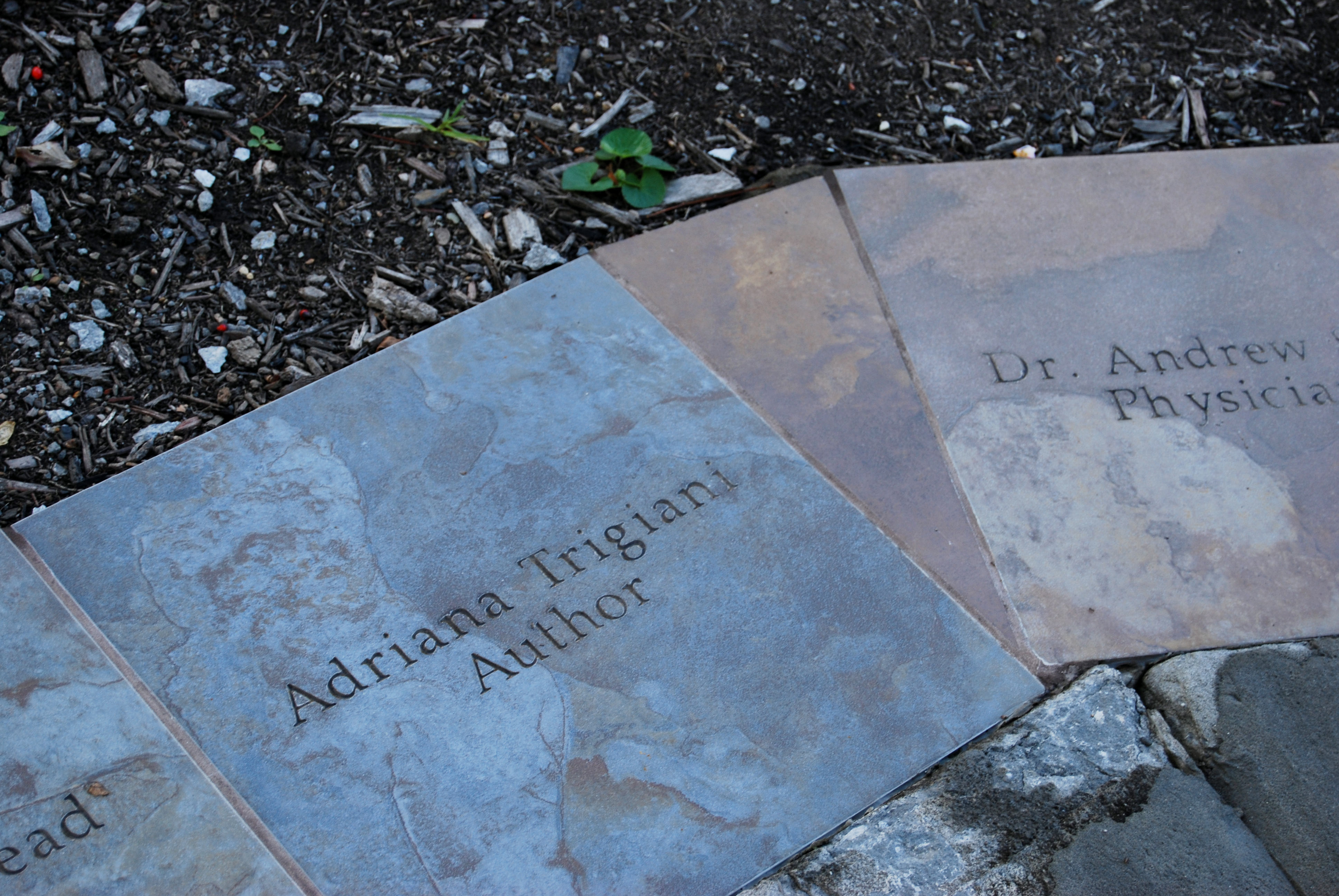
Adriana Trigiani stone at Southwest Virginia Museum

Trigiani authored the best-selling Big Stone Gap series, including Big Stone Gap (2000), Big Cherry Holler (2001), Milk Glass Moon (2002), and Home to Big Stone Gap (2006), set in her Virginia hometown; and the bestselling Valentine trilogy, the tale of a woman working to save her family's shoe company in Greenwich Village. Trigiani also wrote the Viola books, about a clever teenage filmmaker from Brooklyn, for young adults. Trigiani's acclaimed stand-alone novels include Lucia, Lucia (2003), The Queen of the Big Time (2004), and Rococo (2005). Trigiani's book The Shoemaker's Wife is the fictional account of the lives of her own grandparents after emigrating to America from Italy in the early 20th century. Regularly on The New York Times Bestseller List, critics have noted Trigiani's ability to "create distinctive voices for each of her characters." Millions of copies of Trigiani's books are in print in the United States and published in 36 countries around the world. Overlapping themes include self-perception, social identity, the universal immigrant story, personal loss, working class life, and contemporary social and environmental issues. Since 2012, Adriana Trigiani Tours, and AT Escapes, have offered travel tours to Italy, Scotland, Spain and Gibraltar inspired by the novels of Adriana Trigiani.

During the 1990s, Trigiani wrote and directed an award-winning documentary Queen of The Big Time (1996), the story of her father's hometown of Roseto, Pennsylvania, shown in film festivals in London and Hong Kong, co-produced Green Chimneys, and later contributed to PBS documentary The Italian Americans. In 2014, Trigiani directed the major motion picture Big Stone Gap, a romantic comedy film adaptation of her namesake bestselling novel, produced by Donna Gigliotti for Altar Identity Studios, a subsidiary of Media Society. Big Stone Gap is a story of family secrets and self-discovery in an Appalachian coal-mining town of the late 1970s. The award-winning ensemble cast includes Ashley Judd, Whoopi Goldberg, Jane Krakowski, Jenna Elfman, and Patrick Wilson. Released on October 9, 2015 by Picturehouse, Trigiani's narrative directorial debut arrived nearly 30 years after the sale of her first screenplay, Three to Get Married, produced by Kate Benton in 1986. Opening the Virginia Film Festival, Big Stone Gap was ranked among the top 250 grossing women directed films of 2014.

== Media appearances ==
Trigiani and her work have regularly been featured on NBC's Today Show. She was profiled on CBS News Sunday Morning, appeared on The View, Good Day NY with Rosanna Scotto and Lori Stokes, and is heard regularly on NPR around the country. Trigiani has lectured at New York University and the New School for Social Research, has been a commencement speaker and received honorary degrees from Emory & Henry College (2018), Saint Mary's College, Notre Dame, Indiana (2002), the University of Virginia at Wise (2001), and the University of New Haven, Connecticut (2005, 2016). She is host of the Library of Virginia Literary Awards (11 years), was host of the Poets and Writers Gala in New York City (2016), The Audio Publishers Association Audies Gala (2014), and the Barnes & Noble Writers for Writers Awards. She is permanent host of the Erma Bombeck/Arizona Women's Board Annual Authors Luncheon that is committed to the prevention of kidney disease through awareness, education and research.

=== Novels ===
- Big Stone Gap: a novel. New York: Random House, 2000.
- Big Cherry Holler: a Big Stone Gap novel. New York: Random House, 2001.
- Milk Glass Moon: a Big Stone Gap novel. New York: Random House, 2002.
- Lucia, Lucia. London; New York: Simon & Schuster UK, 2003.
- The Queen of the Big Time: a novel. New York: Random House, 2004.
- Rococo: a novel. New York: Random House, 2005.
- Home to Big Stone Gap; a novel. New York: Random House, 2006.
- Very Valentine: a novel. New York: Random House, 2009.
- Viola in Reel Life. New York: Harper Teen, 2009.
- Brava, Valentine: a novel. Harper Collins Publishers, 2010.
- Viola In the Spotlight. New York: Harper Teen, 2011.
- The Shoemaker's Wife: a novel. New York: Harper Collins Publishers, 2012.
- The Supreme Macaroni Company: a novel. New York: Harper Collins Publishers, 2013.
- All The Stars in the Heavens: a novel. New York: Harper, Harper Collins Publishers, 2015.
- Kiss Carlo. New York: Harper Collins Publishers, 2017.
- Tony's Wife: a novel. New York: Harper Collins Publishers, 2018.
- The House of Love. Dutton, 2021.
- The Good Left Undone. Dutton, 2022.
- The View from Lake Como. Dutton, 2025.

=== Memoirs ===
- Cooking With My Sisters: One Hundred Years of Family Recipes from Bari to Big Stone Gap. New York: Random House, 2004.
- Don't Sing At The Table: Life Lessons From My Grandmothers New York: Harper, 2010.

=== Professional recognition ===
- 1996: Audience Award, Queens of the Big Time. Hamptons International Film Festival & Palm Springs International Film Festival.
- 2003: The New York Times Best Seller list, Lucia, Lucia: a novel.
- 2004: The New York Times Best Seller list, The Queen of the Big Time: a novel.
- 2004: Best Read in England and Publishers Weekly Bestsellers list, Lucia, Lucia: a novel.
- 2005: Publishers Weekly Fiction Award finalist and New York Times Best Seller list, Rococo: a novel.
- 2006: Library of Virginia Annual Literary Awards, Big Stone Gap: a novel.
- 2006: People's Choice Awards finalist, Big Stone Gap: a novel.
- 2007: Library of Virginia Annual Literary Awards, Home to Big Stone Gap: a novel.
- 2008: Shepherd University Foundation, The West Virginia Humanities Council, and The West Virginia Center for the Book, Appalachian Heritage Writer's Award.
- 2009: The New York Times Best Seller list, Very Valentine: a novel.
- 2010: The New York Times Best Seller list, Brava Valentine: a novel.
- 2010: American Library Association Reading List selection, Very Valentine: a novel.
- 2012: Publishers Weekly and New York Times lists of bestselling books: The Shoemaker's Wife: a novel.
- 2013: Publishers Weekly Bestsellers list, The Supreme Macaroni Company: a novel.
- 2013: The National Organization of Italian American Women, Connecticut Region, honoree Adriana Trigiani.
- 2015: Bentonville Film Festival Award, Best Ensemble Cast, Big Stone Gap (film).
- 2015: The New York Times, Barnes & Noble, USA Today, and Publishers Weekly lists of bestselling books, All the Stars In the Heaven.
- 2015: Seattle International Film Festival Women in Cinema Series, Big Stone Gap (film).
