= June Tolliver House =

Historic house in Virginia, United States

- U.S. National Register of Historic Places
- Virginia Landmarks Register
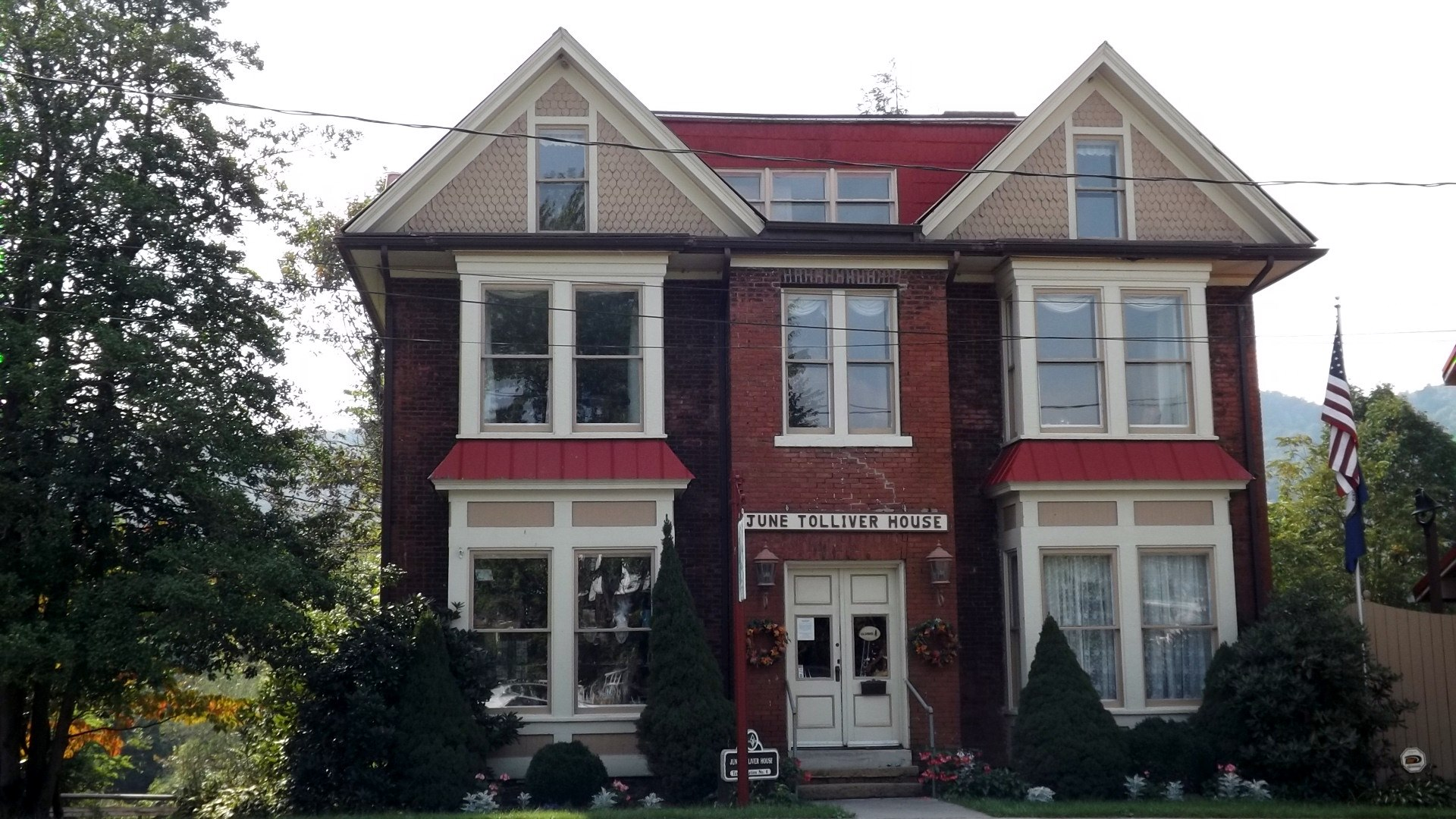
- "June Tolliver" House, September 2013

- Location within Virginia Location within the United States
- Location: 522 Clinton Ave E, Big Stone Gap, Virginia
- Coordinates: 36°52′2″N 82°46′22″W
- Area: 1 acre (0.40 ha)
- Built: 1890
- Architectural style: Queen Anne
- NRHP reference No.: 73002067
- VLR No.: 101-0003

Significant dates
- Added to NRHP: August 28, 1973
- Designated VLR: July 17, 1973

June Tolliver House, also known as the June Tolliver House & Folk Art Center, is a historic home located at Big Stone Gap, Wise County, Virginia. It was built in 1890, and is a 2 1/2-story, three-bay Queen Anne-style brick dwelling. It has complex gable roof with projecting end bays. It is recognized as the house in which June Morris, the prototype of June Tolliver, heroine of John Fox, Jr.'s The Trail of the Lonesome Pine boarded when she came to school in Big Stone Gap. The house is open as a museum.

It was listed on the National Register of Historic Places in 1973.
