= Lonesome Pine =

Lonesome Pine may refer to:

- Lonesome Pine Fiddlers, a bluegrass band (1938–1966)
- Lonesome Pine Airport, near Wise, Virginia, US
- Lonesome Pine District, a former high school sports league in Virginia, US
- Lonesome Pine Council, a former Boy Scouts of America local organization
- Lonesome Pine Trails, a ski resort in Maine, US
- Lonesome Pine, a 1986 album by The Lonesome Strangers
- Lonesome Pine Regional Business and Technology Park, in Wise County, Virginia, US
- Lonesome Pine Raceway, in Wise County, Virginia, US

== See also ==
- "Lonesome Pine Special", a bluegrass song by the Carter Family
- Lonesome Pine Special (PBS), a PBS program
- The Trail of the Lonesome Pine (disambiguation)
- Lone Pine (disambiguation)
