= The Little Shepherd of Kingdom Come (1928 film) =

1928 film

The Little Shepherd of Kingdom Come (aka: Kentucky Courage)
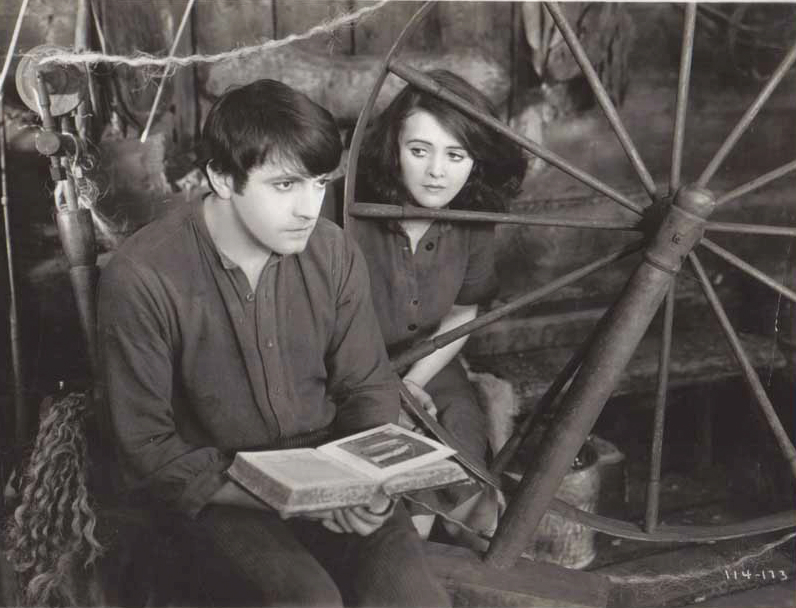
- Still with Richard Barthelmess and Molly O'Day
- Directed by: Alfred Santell
- Written by: Bess Meredyth
- Based on: The Little Shepherd of Kingdom Come by John Fox, Jr.
- Produced by: Richard A. Rowland
- Starring: Richard Barthelmess; Molly O'Day
- Cinematography: Lee Garmes
- Edited by: Hugh Bennett
- Distributed by: First National Pictures
- Release date: April 8, 1928
- Running time: 80 minutes
- Country: United States
- Language: Silent (English intertitles)

The Little Shepherd of Kingdom Come is a 1928 American silent drama film directed by Alfred Santell and starring Richard Barthelmess. It was produced and distributed by First National Pictures. The film is a remake of a 1920 Goldwyn Pictures film with the same title starring Jack Pickford. It was filmed again as a 1961 CinemaScope film directed by Andrew V. McLaglen and starring singer Jimmie Rodgers.

== Cast ==
- Richard Barthelmess as Chad Buford
- Molly O'Day as Melissa Turner
- Nelson McDowell as Old Joel Turner
- Martha Mattox as Maw Turner
- Victor Potel as Tom Turner
- Mark Hamilton as Dolph Turner
- William Bertram as Caleb Haazel
- Walter P. Lewis as Old Tad Dillon
- Gardner James as Daws Dillon
- Ralph Yearsley as Tad Dillon
- Gustav von Seyffertitz as Nathan Cherry
- Robert Milasch as The Circuit Rider
- Claude Gillingwater as Major Buford
- David Torrence as General Dean
- Eulalie Jensen as Mrs. Dean

== Preservation ==
With no prints of The Little Shepherd of Kingdom Come located in any film archives, it is a lost film.
