= Christ Episcopal Church (Big Stone Gap, Virginia) =

Historic church in Virginia, United States

- U.S. National Register of Historic Places
- Virginia Landmarks Register
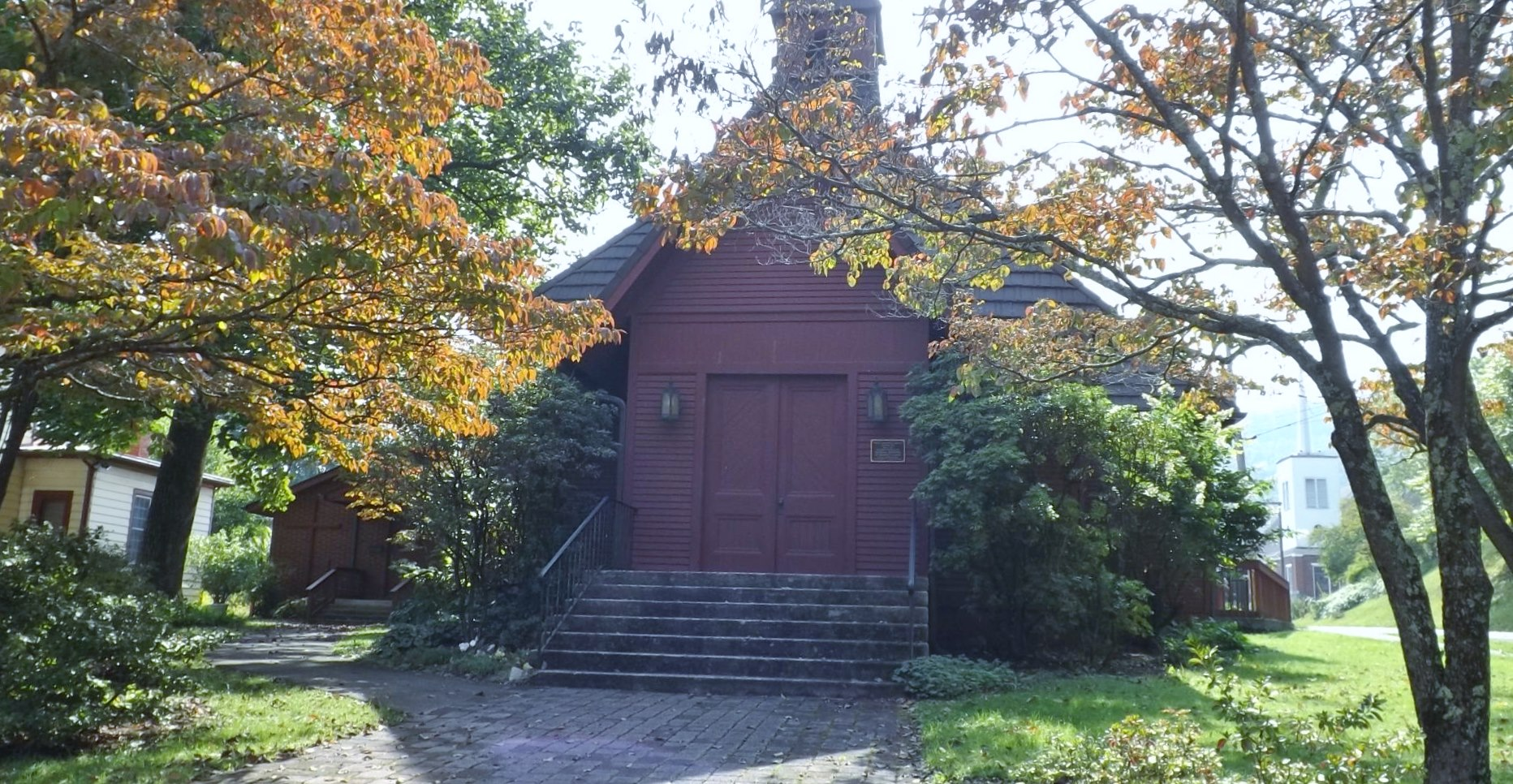
- Christ Episcopal Church, September 2013

- Location within Virginia Location within the United States
- Location: 100 Clinton Ave., Big Stone Gap, Virginia
- Coordinates: 36°51′50″N 82°46′35″W
- Area: 1 acre (0.40 ha)
- Built: 1892
- Architect: Ghequiere, T. Buckler; Spaulding, C.E. & C.H.
- Architectural style: Gothic
- NRHP reference No.: 89001905
- VLR No.: 101-0005

Significant dates
- Added to NRHP: December 19, 1990
- Designated VLR: April 18, 1989

Christ Episcopal Church, also known as Christ Church, Big Stone Gap, is a historic Episcopal church located at 100 Clinton Avenue in Big Stone Gap, Wise County, Virginia. It was built in 1892, and is a cruciform frame church. It is covered with weatherboard and the hipped roof has asphalt shingles. The interior features Gothic style details. Christ Church was organized as a congregation in October 1890 and is one of the oldest in this area.

Designed by T. Buckler Chequior of Baltimore, construction of the building began in March 1892 at a cost of $2300. The church was consecrated on May 7, 1892. Red barn paint was donated by J. K. Taggart, whose family still supplies the distinctive red color.

The altar was donated by the Nelson family from a mid-nineteenth century church in Restburg, VA. In 1915, the choir room in the southwest corner was added for $91. The second room was added in 1917. In 1942, the sanctuary and porch were enlarged, and the Parish Hall was built in 1964.

In 1987, the prayer rails were made from the original altar rails by J. Phelps Walker of Richmond, VA, father of Paxton Allgyer and given in memory of her mother, Josephine K. Walker. The chairs at the altar were given in memory of Margaret and Randolph Parker by their daughter, Emily Kendig of Richmond, VA. The vigil candles were given by Joan Short in memory of her parents, Abner and Madeline Boyd and in honor of the Canon 9 ministry of Rev. Ray Moore. The antique-cabinet above the vigil candles is from a British Anglican church and was donated by Pat Miller and Bill Miller of Abingdon. The Aumbry was donated by the Rev. and Mrs. Benjamin F. Wheless, Jr.

Designated a Virginia Historic Landmark on April 18, 1989, Christ Church was subsequently listed on the National Register of Historic Places in 1990.
