= Big Stone Gap, Virginia =

- Town
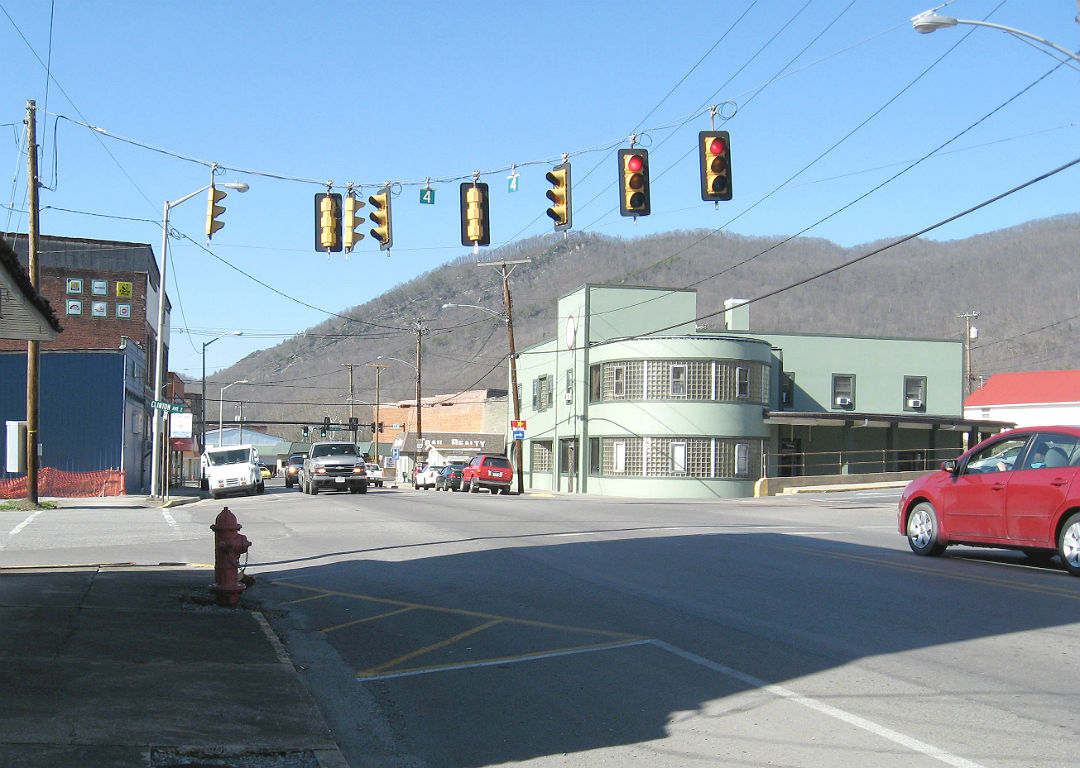
- Central Big Stone Gap. Little Stone Mountain is visible in the background.

- Seal

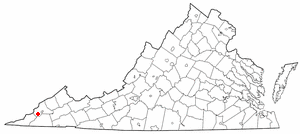
- Location in the Commonwealth of Virginia
- Coordinates: 36°52′54″N 82°44′50″W
- Country: United States
- State: Virginia
- County: Wise

Government
  - Mayor: Gary Johnson

Area
  - Total: 5.03 sq mi (13.02 km^{2})
  - Land: 4.93 sq mi (12.78 km^{2})
  - Water: 0.093 sq mi (0.24 km^{2})
- Elevation: 1,535 ft (468 m)

Population (2020)
  - Total: 5,254
  - Density: 1,039.8/sq mi (401.48/km^{2})
- Time zone: UTC−5 (EST)
  - Summer (DST): UTC−4 (EDT)
- ZIP Code: 24219
- Area code: 276 Exchange: 523
- FIPS code: 51-07480
- GNIS feature ID: 1496805
- Website: bigstonegap.org

Big Stone Gap is a town in Wise County, Virginia, United States. The town was economically centered around the coal industry for much of its early development. The population was 5,254 at the 2020 census.

== History ==
The community was formerly known as "Mineral City" and "Three Forks" before officially taking its name in 1888. The "Big Stone Gap" refers to the valley created on the Appalachia Straight, located between the town and Appalachia, Virginia. The town served as an important center for coal and iron development in the 1880s and 1890s and residents hoped its coal and iron ore deposits would make it "the Pittsburgh of the South", although that nickname would later be used by the significantly larger city of Birmingham, Alabama.

The Big Stone Gap post office was established in 1856. The Christ Episcopal Church, John Fox, Jr. House, Southwest Virginia Museum Historical State Park, Terrace Park Girl Scout Cabin, June Tolliver House, and C. Bascom Slemp Federal Building are listed on the National Register of Historic Places.

In October 1978, John W. Warner, then the Republican candidate for U.S. Senate from Virginia, and his wife, British-American actress Elizabeth Taylor, stopped in Big Stone Gap to campaign for his upcoming election. At Fraley's Coach House, a local diner where they were each meeting with voters, Taylor choked on a chicken bone in her esophagus and was transported to the nearby Lonesome Pine Regional Hospital. Taylor recovered from the event and later sent a donation to the hospital as a thank you.

In 2014, the American drama romantic comedy film Big Stone Gap, written and directed by Big Stone Gap native Adriana Trigiani and produced by Donna Gigliotti, began filming in the town. The film starred Ashley Judd, Patrick Wilson, Whoopi Goldberg, and others, including local talent for many of the background extras in larger scenes. The movie was based on Trigiani's 2000 novel of the same name and was produced on a $3.5-million budget. The film premiered at the Virginia Film Festival on November 6, 2014, and expanded to a wider release of over 100 theaters in 2015.

Big Stone Gap became the first locality in the nation to pass a resolution in support of the federal Black Lung Disability Trust Fund on August 16, 2018. The measure passed unanimously and urged Congress to support the existing tax rate at the time.

== Geography ==
Big Stone Gap is located at 36°52′02″N 82°46′28″W (36.867165, −82.774471).

According to the United States Census Bureau, the town has a total area of 4.9 square miles (12.6 km^{2}), all land.

Big Stone Gap is at the junction of U.S. Route 23 and U.S. Route 58 Alternate.

=== Climate ===
Big Stone Gap has a humid subtropical climate (Köppen climate classification Cfa).

Climate data for Big Stone Gap, Virginia (1991–2020 normals, extremes 1990–present)
Month	Jan	Feb	Mar	Apr	May	Jun	Jul	Aug	Sep	Oct	Nov	Dec	Year
Record high °F (°C)	75 (24)	76 (24)	84 (29)	88 (31)	91 (33)	100 (38)	102 (39)	96 (36)	97 (36)	91 (33)	83 (28)	75 (24)	102 (39)
Mean daily maximum °F (°C)	43.9 (6.6)	48.1 (8.9)	56.9 (13.8)	67.3 (19.6)	74.8 (23.8)	81.4 (27.4)	83.8 (28.8)	83.4 (28.6)	78.8 (26.0)	68.7 (20.4)	57.2 (14.0)	47.5 (8.6)	66.0 (18.9)
Daily mean °F (°C)	33.9 (1.1)	37.3 (2.9)	44.7 (7.1)	54.0 (12.2)	62.7 (17.1)	70.2 (21.2)	73.5 (23.1)	72.6 (22.6)	67.2 (19.6)	55.7 (13.2)	44.8 (7.1)	37.3 (2.9)	54.5 (12.5)
Mean daily minimum °F (°C)	23.9 (−4.5)	26.4 (−3.1)	32.6 (0.3)	40.8 (4.9)	50.6 (10.3)	59.0 (15.0)	63.2 (17.3)	61.9 (16.6)	55.5 (13.1)	42.6 (5.9)	32.4 (0.2)	27.2 (−2.7)	43.0 (6.1)
Record low °F (°C)	−12 (−24)	−17 (−27)	−2 (−19)	19 (−7)	30 (−1)	42 (6)	42 (6)	48 (9)	36 (2)	20 (−7)	11 (−12)	1 (−17)	−17 (−27)
Average precipitation inches (mm)	4.87 (124)	4.95 (126)	5.38 (137)	5.03 (128)	5.08 (129)	4.59 (117)	5.49 (139)	4.49 (114)	3.80 (97)	3.14 (80)	3.66 (93)	5.53 (140)	56.01 (1,423)
Average snowfall inches (cm)	3.1 (7.9)	2.9 (7.4)	1.3 (3.3)	0.0 (0.0)	0.0 (0.0)	0.0 (0.0)	0.0 (0.0)	0.0 (0.0)	0.0 (0.0)	0.0 (0.0)	0.1 (0.25)	1.8 (4.6)	9.2 (23)
Average precipitation days (≥ 0.01 in)	11.7	11.5	13.7	12.1	13.5	13.0	13.5	11.5	9.6	8.4	10.1	12.4	141.0
Average snowy days (≥ 0.1 in)	1.6	1.3	0.4	0.0	0.0	0.0	0.0	0.0	0.0	0.0	0.1	0.6	4.0
Source: NOAA

== Demographics ==
Historical population
Census	Pop.	Note	%±
1900	1,617		—
1910	2,590		60.2%
1920	3,009		16.2%
1930	3,908		29.9%
1940	4,331		10.8%
1950	5,173		19.4%
1960	4,688		−9.4%
1970	4,153		−11.4%
1980	4,748		14.3%
1990	4,748		0.0%
2000	4,856		2.3%
2010	5,643		16.2%
2020	5,254		−6.9%
2025 (est.)	5,102	▼	−2.9%

As of the census of 2010, there were 5,643 people, 2,034 households, and 1,075 families residing in the town. The population density was 995.9 people per square mile (384.2/km^{2}). There were 2,197 housing units at an average density of 450.6 per square mile (173.8/km^{2}). The racial makeup of the town was 93.68% White, 4.41% African American, 0.14% Native American, 0.45% Asian, 0.02% Pacific Islander, 0.37% from other races, and 0.93% from two or more races. Hispanic or Latino of any race were 0.60% of the population.

There were 1,995 households, out of which 29.6% had children under the age of 18 living with them, 48.7% were married couples living together, 15.3% had a female householder with no husband present, and 33.2% were non-families. 30.8% of all households were made up of individuals, and 13.8% had someone living alone who was 65 years of age or older. The average household size was 2.34 and the average family size was 2.92.

In the town, the population was spread out, with 23.2% under the age of 18, 9.0% from 18 to 24, 24.9% from 25 to 44, 25.1% from 45 to 64, and 17.9% who were 65 years of age or older. The median age was 40 years. For every 100 females, there were 86.9 males. For every 100 females age 18 and over, there were 80.5 males.

The median income for a household in the town was $21,584, and the median income for a family was $34,306. Males had a median income of $26,707 versus $21,915 for females. The per capita income for the town was $13,284. About 22.4% of families and 25.8% of the population were below the poverty line, including 34.5% of those under age 18 and 15.1% of those age 65 or over.

== Education ==
=== Public schools ===
Due to mounting financial burdens caused by a shrinking population and underfunding from the state government, local elected officials voted to consolidate several of the county's schools in 2012, including those in Big Stone Gap.

Union Primary School was formed from the consolidation of Powell Valley Primary School and Appalachia Elementary. A combination of certain grades from Appalachia Elementary and Powell Valley Middle School formed Union Middle School. Finally, Union High School was formed from the consolidation of Appalachia High School and Powell Valley High School. All schools continue to be operated by Wise County Public Schools.

=== Colleges ===
Mountain Empire Community College is a public community college for residents in Lee, Wise, Scott, and Dickenson counties, and the City of Norton. The college admitted its first students in 1972 and as of the 2017–18 school year enrolled 3,560 students.

King University, based in Bristol, Tennessee, has a satellite campus in Big Stone Gap located on the Mountain Empire Community College campus.

== Museums ==
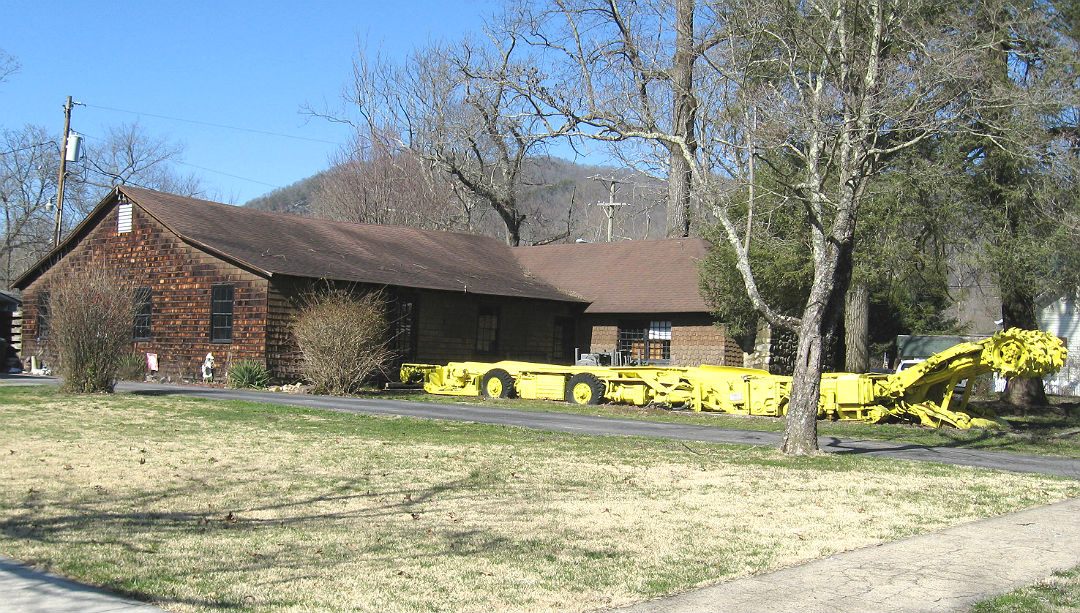
Henry Meador Coal Museum

Big Stone Gap is home to several museums. The June Tolliver House, located on Jerome Street, is home to the Trail of the Lonesome Pine, the official outdoor drama of Virginia.

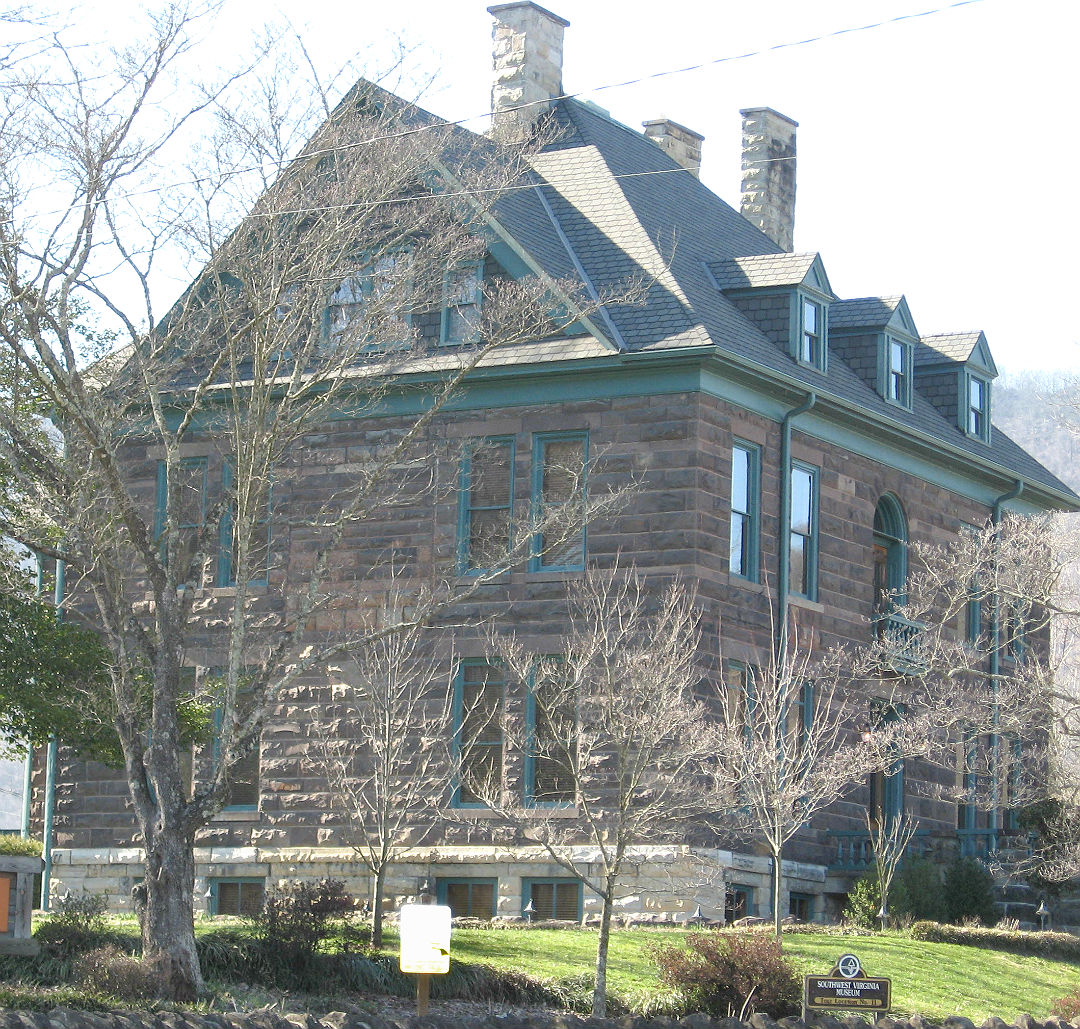
Southwest Virginia Museum

The Southwest Virginia Museum Historical State Park is located in the downtown area in the former home of C. Bascom Slemp. Construction of the building was completed in 1895 and purchased by Slemp in 1929. Before his death in 1943, Slemp established the C. Bascom Slemp Foundation and hoped to see the house turned into a museum. In 1946 the state of Virginia acquired the home, and the Slemp Foundation donated the initial collection from Slemp's personal belongings.

Big Stone Gap also hosts the Meador Coal Museum. Meador, to whom the museum is dedicated, collected many of the objects displayed in the museum from his time with the Westmoreland Coal Company during the first half of the 20th century. The museum was dedicated in 1982 after his death.

== Federal court ==
The federal building named for C. Bascom Slemp was built in 1912 and it housed a division of the United States District Court for the Western District of Virginia until the division's closure in 2023.

== Wallens Ridge State Prison ==
Big Stone Gap is home to Wallens Ridge State Prison, a state prison that has been a part of the Commonwealth of Virginia Department of Corrections since 1999. Originally opened as a supermax prison, it has recently been downgraded to a "high level" security facility. Construction and maintenance of the facility generated millions of dollars for the local economy, suppressed from a sagging history of coal mining.

== Notable people ==
- Rufus A. Ayers, former Virginia attorney general
- James L. Camblos (1888–1970), mayor of Norton, state delegate
- Leanza Cornett, Miss America 1993
- John Fox, Jr., author
- Abner Linwood Holton Jr., former Virginia governor
- Julius Jones, former professional football player
- Thomas Jones, former professional football player
- Carl Martin, musician
- Roy Cornelius Smith, opera singer
- CC Swiney, film actor
- Adriana Trigiani, author
- Roy Hall, rockabilly, pianist
- James Mitchell, football player, tight end for the Carolina Panthers
- Star Wood, football coach and administrator

== Film ==
Adriana Trigiani, who wrote the script for the movie Big Stone Gap, lobbied to have the 2014 film shot on location. The former gas station that was the setting for Carmine's restaurant in the movie still contains the soda fountain, tables and nostalgic wall posters used during filming. Next to it is the vacant Mutual's Pharmacy, where Ave Marie Mulligan, the movie's main character, worked.

== 2008 tornado ==
On March 4, 2008, an EF-1 tornado touched down on Highway 58 and ran through downtown. The tornado caused a 300-yard wide, one-mile long path of damage. It destroyed six homes, caused major damage to 15 homes, and minor damage to 25 others. The tornado hit an area of the town named Poplar Hill.
