= Terrace Park Girl Scout Cabin =

- U.S. National Register of Historic Places
- Virginia Landmarks Register
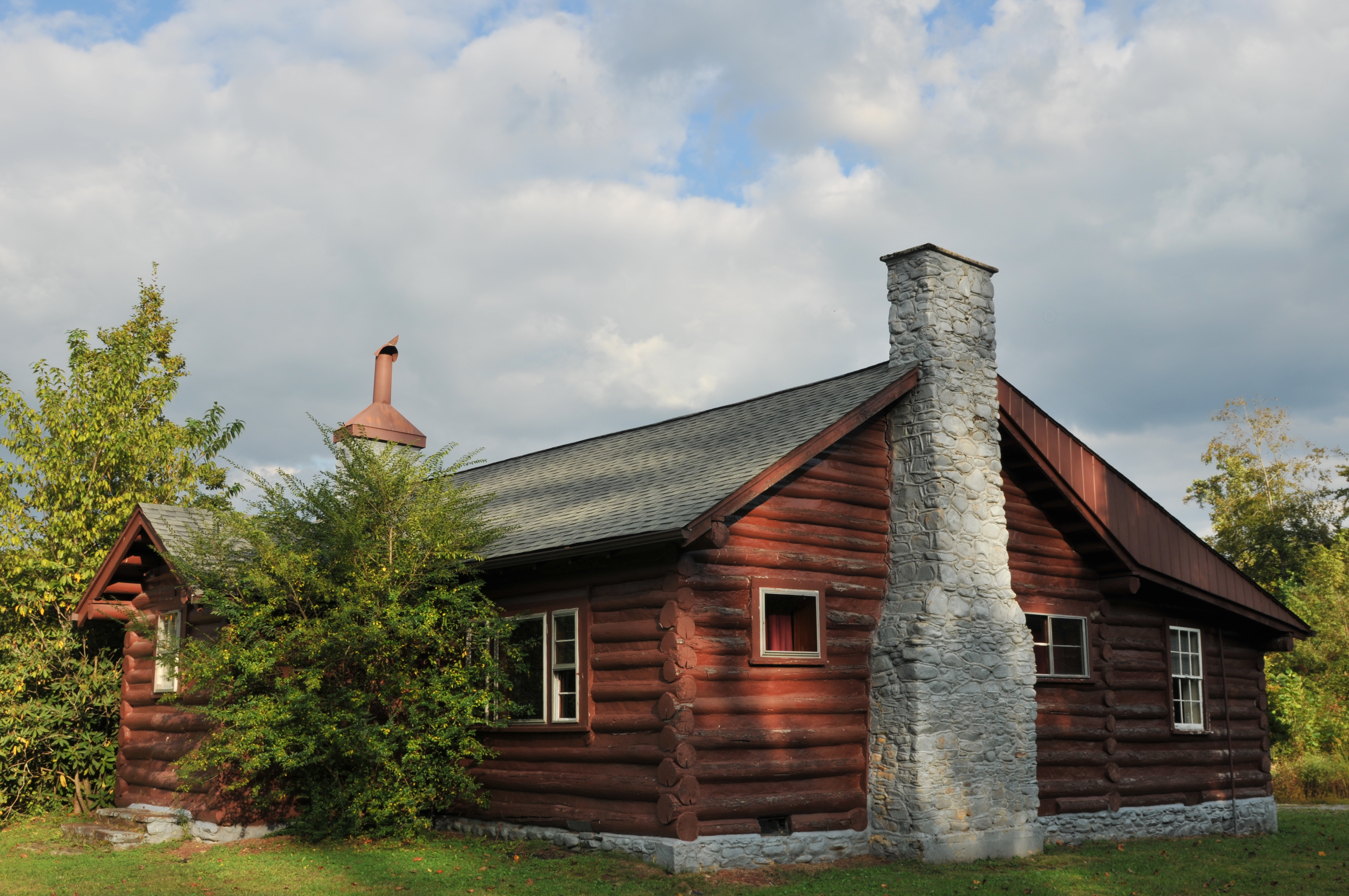
- Terrace Park Girl Scout Cabin, September 2013

- Location within Virginia Location within the United States
- Location: 211 Proctor St. N., Big Stone Gap, Virginia
- Coordinates: 36°51′55″N 82°46′50″W
- Area: 2 acres (0.81 ha)
- Built: 1938
- Built by: Seay, B.; Blessing, J.M.
- Architectural style: Rustic log cabin
- NRHP reference No.: 07001146
- VLR No.: 101-0046

Significant dates
- Added to NRHP: November 1, 2007
- Designated VLR: September 5, 2007

Terrace Park Girl Scout Cabin, also known as the Big Stone Gap Girl Scout Cabin, is a historic Girl Scouts of the United States of America clubhouse at Big Stone Gap, Wise County, Virginia. It was built in 1938 by the National Youth Administration. It is a one-story, five room log building constructed of large, round pine logs. It has a low gable roof and exterior end chimneys constructed of cobblestone. It was used by the Girl Scouts until 1943, after which it was acquired by Big Stone Gap as a rental facility for public events.

It was listed on the National Register of Historic Places in 2007.

== See also ==
- Scouting in Virginia
