= Lone Pine =

Lone Pine may refer to:

== Places ==
- Lone Pine, California, in Inyo County
- Lone Pine, California, former name of McFarland, Inyo County, California
- Lone Pine Barracks, an Australian Army base in New South Wales
- Lone Pine Commonwealth War Graves Commission Cemetery in Turkey
- Lone Pine Koala Sanctuary in Brisbane, Australia
- Lone Pine (Evergreen, Louisiana), a historic place in Avoyelles Parish
- Lone Pine (Tarboro, North Carolina), a historic place
- Lone Pine Township, Itasca County, Minnesota

== Arts, entertainment, and media ==
- Hal Lone Pine, American-Canadian musician
- Lone Pine (books), a children's book series written by Malcolm Saville
- Lone Pine International, a chess tournament
- Lone Pine Publishing

== Botany ==
- Lone Pine (tree)
  - Pinus brutia
  - Pinus halepensis

== Historical events ==
- 1872 Lone Pine earthquake, one of the largest earthquakes to hit California in recorded history
- Battle of Lone Pine, at Gallipolli, Turkey during WWI

== Other uses ==
- Lone Pine Capital, a hedge fund management company

== See also ==
- Lonesome Pine (disambiguation)
