= The Little Shepherd of Kingdom Come (1961 film) =

1961 film by Andrew V. McLaglen

- Theatrical poster
- Directed by: Andrew V. McLaglen
- Written by: Barré Lyndon
- Based on: The Little Shepherd of Kingdom Come; 1903 novel by John William Fox
- Produced by: Maury Dexter
- Starring: Jimmie Rodgers; Luana Patten; Chill Wills; Linda Hutchings; Robert Dix; George Kennedy; Neil Hamilton
- Cinematography: Floyd Crosby
- Edited by: Jodie Copelan; Carl Pierson
- Music by: Henry Vars
- Color process: Color by DeLuxe
- Production companies: Associated Producers, Inc.
- Distributed by: 20th Century Fox
- Release date: April 1961
- Running time: 108 minutes
- Country: United States
- Language: English

The Little Shepherd of Kingdom Come is an American CinemaScope Western film directed by Andrew V. McLaglen. It stars Jimmie Rodgers and Luana Patten and includes the film debut of George Kennedy.

It is based on the 1903 novel of the same title by John Fox Jr., which had previously been filmed in 1920, directed by Wallace Worsley and starring Jack Pickford, and again in 1928, directed by Alfred Santell and starring Richard Barthelmess.

== Plot ==
Chad (Jimmie Rodgers) is a confused young man growing up in 1860s Kentucky. Sheltered from his brutal guardian by a friendly schoolmaster, he learns to love the tiny village of Kingdom Come and has no inclination of leaving. But when the American Civil War breaks out, he finds himself at odds with most of his friends by joining the Union Army. His wartime experiences force Chad to grow up in a hurry, and he returns to Kingdom Come with a whole new outlook on his future existence.

== Cast ==
- Jimmie Rodgers as Chad
- Luana Patten as Melissa Turner
- Chill Wills as Major Buford
- Linda Hutchings as Margaret Dean
- Robert Dix as Caleb Turner
- George Kennedy as Nathan Dillon
- Ken Miller as Reuben
- Neil Hamilton as Gen. Dean
- Shirley O'Hara as Mrs. Turner
- Lois January as Mrs. Dean

== Production ==
The film was made by Robert L. Lippert's production company but was released as a 20th Century Fox production as opposed to the Regal Films logo, which they occasionally did.

Filming started September 1960.
