= Publishers Weekly lists of bestselling novels in the United States =

This is a list of lists of bestselling novels in the United States as determined by Publishers Weekly. The list features the most popular novels of each year from 1895 through 2020.

The standards set for inclusion in the lists – which, for example, led to the exclusion of the novels in the Harry Potter series from the lists for the 1990s and 2000s – are currently unknown.

For many years, the list was maintained by Alice Payne Hackett, who also published a decennial series which summarized and commented on the best sellers of the previous decade. Her Seventy Years of Bestsellers 1895–1965 was published in 1970.

== See also ==
- Books in the United States
- Lists of The New York Times Fiction Best Sellers
