= John Fox Jr. =

American journalist, novelist and short story writer

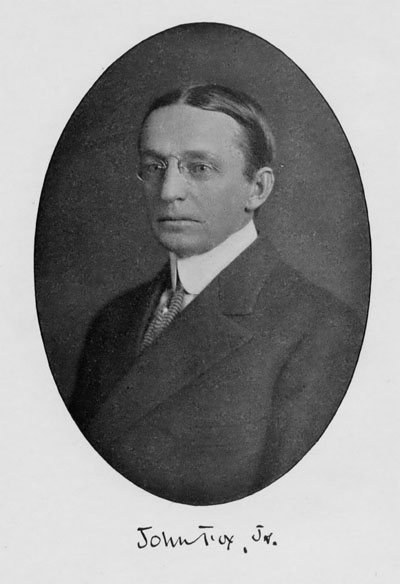
- John Fox Jr. in the frontispiece of a 1911 New York publication of Crittenden
- Born: December 16, 1862; Bourbon County, Kentucky, United States
- Died: July 7, 1919 (aged 56); Big Stone Gap, Virginia, United States
- Education: Harvard University
- Occupations: Journalist; novelist; short-story writer
- Years active: 1883–1919

John Fox Jr. (December 16, 1862 – July 8, 1919) was an American journalist, novelist, and short story writer. His home in Big Stone Gap, Virginia is a museum and listed on the National Register of Historic Places. Several of his works were bestsellers and were adapted to films. He married an opera star. He was inducted into the Kentucky Writers Hall of Fame.

== Biography ==
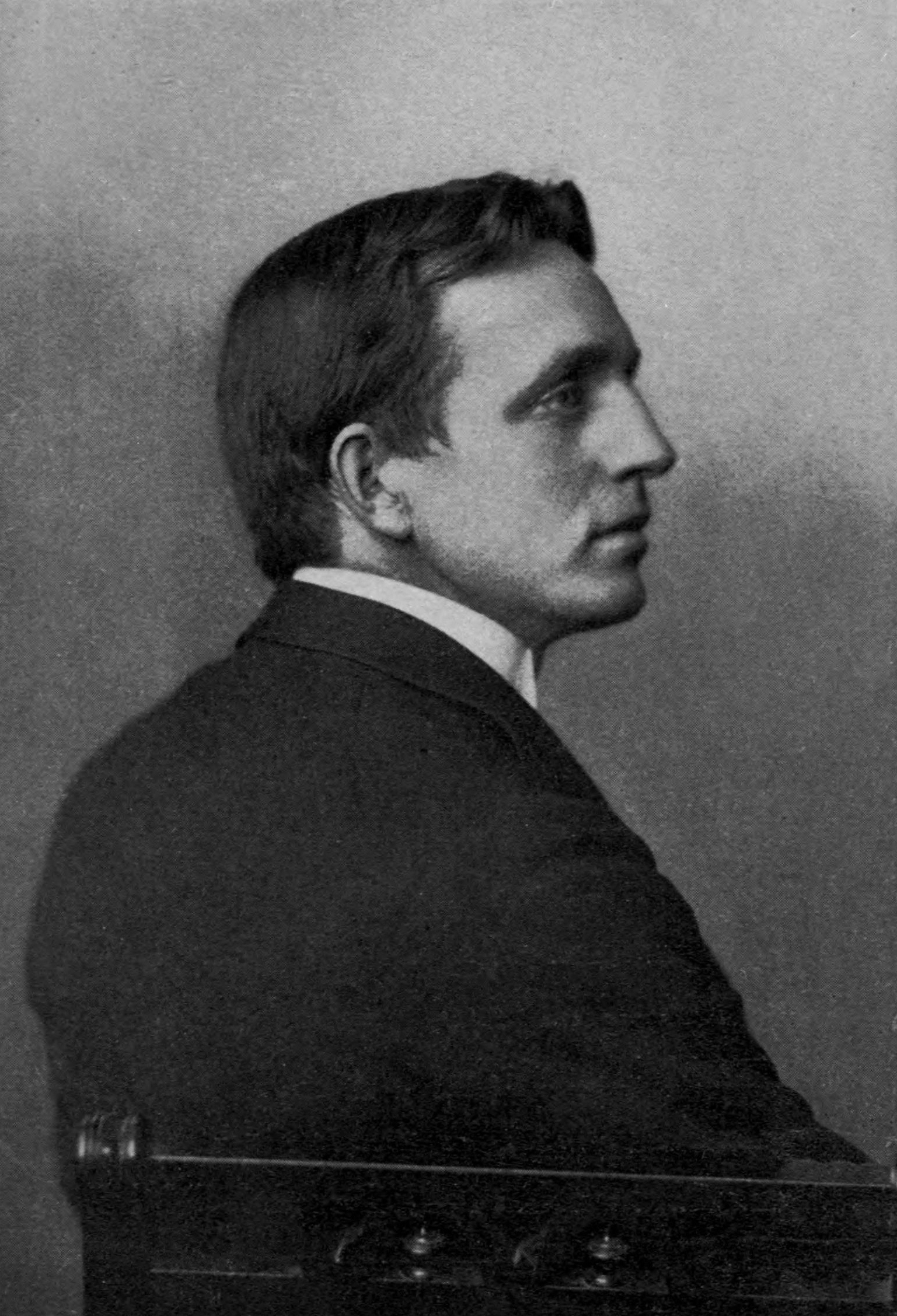
John Fox Jr. 1903

Born in Stony Point, Kentucky, to John William Fox Sr. and Minerva Worth Carr, Fox studied English at Harvard University. He graduated in 1883 before becoming a reporter in New York City. After working for both The New York Times and The Sun, he published a successful serialization of his first novel, A Mountain Europa, in Century magazine in 1892. Two moderately successful short story collections followed, as well as his first conventional novel, The Kentuckians in 1898. Fox gained a following as a war correspondent, working for Harper's Weekly in Cuba during the Spanish–American War of 1898, where he served with the "Rough Riders." Six years later he traveled to Asia to report on the Russo-Japanese War for Scribner's magazine.

Though he occasionally wrote for periodicals, after 1904, Fox dedicated much of his attention to fiction. The Little Shepherd of Kingdom Come (published in 1903) and The Trail of the Lonesome Pine (published in 1908) are arguably his most well known and successful works, entering the New York Times top ten list of bestselling novels for 1903, 1904, 1908, and 1909 respectively. In The Trail of the Lonesome Pine, the character Devil Judd Tolliver was based on the real life of "Devil John" Wesley Wright, the sheriff of Wise County, Virginia. Many of his works reflected the naturalist style, his childhood in Kentucky's Bluegrass region, and his life among the coal miners of Big Stone Gap, Virginia. Many of his novels were historical romances or period dramas set in that region.

== Legacy ==
John Fox Jr. died in 1919 of pneumonia during the global influenza epidemic in Big Stone Gap, Virginia; he was buried in the family plot in Paris, Kentucky. His marriage to Austrian opera singer Fritzi Scheff in 1908 lasted just over four years. He had no children.

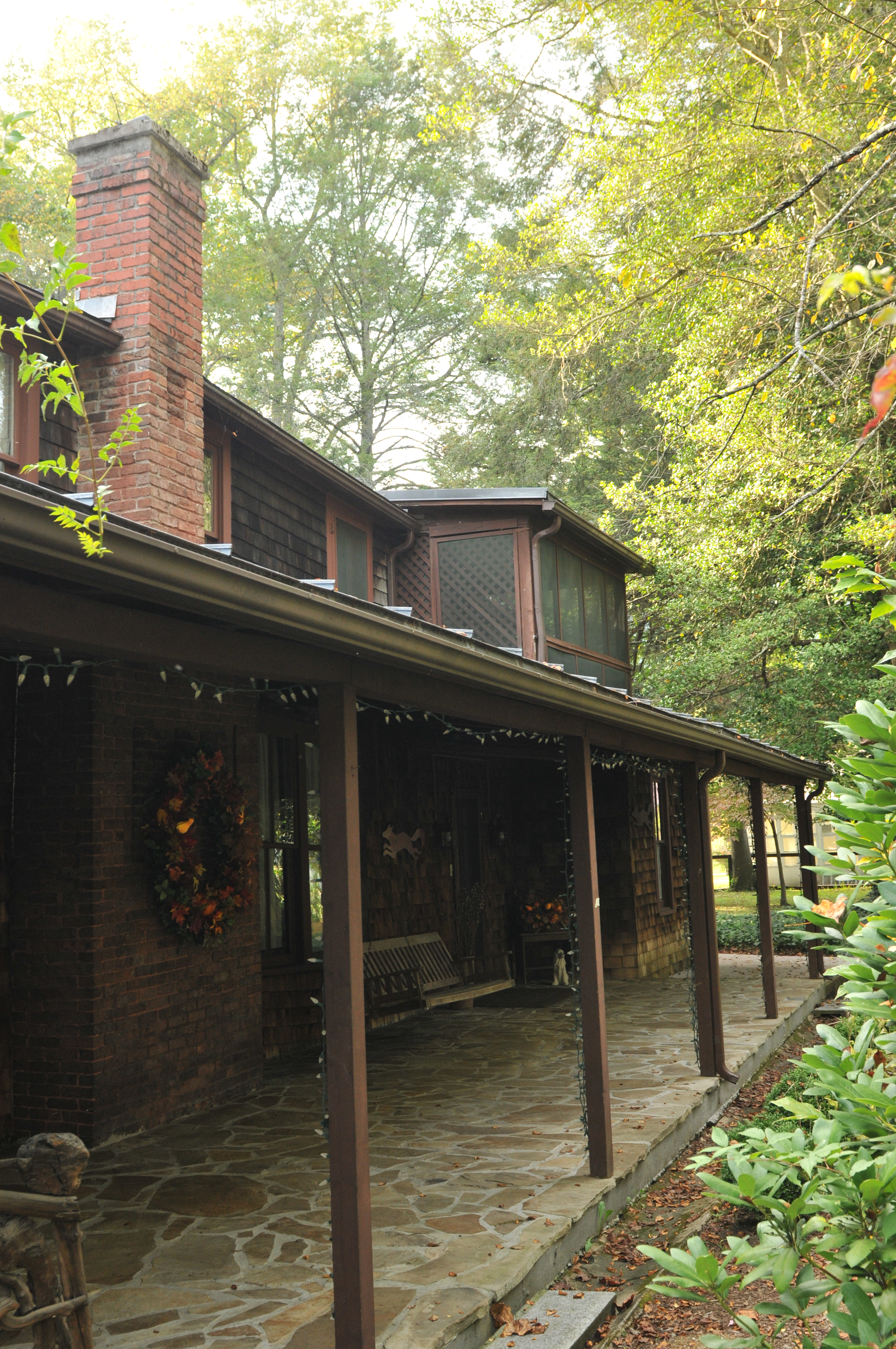
John Fox Jr. House / Museum front porch

The John Fox Jr. House in Big Stone Gap was turned into a museum after the death of John's sister in 1970. It was listed on the National Register of Historic Places in 1974.

== Bibliography ==
- A Cumberland Vendetta and Other Stories (1895)
- Hell-fer-Sartain and Other Stories (1897)
- The Kentuckians (1898)
- A Mountain Europa (serialized 1892, published 1899)
- Crittenden: A Kentucky Story of Love and War (1900)
- Blue-grass and Rhododendron: Outdoors in Old Kentucky (1901)
- The Little Shepherd of Kingdom Come (1903)
- Christmas Eve on Lonesome and Other Stories (1904)
- Following the Sun Flag: A Vain Pursuit Through Manchuria (1905)
- A Knight of the Cumberland (1906)
- The Trail of the Lonesome Pine (1908)
- The Heart of the Hills (1913)
- In Happy Valley (1917)
- Erskine Dale (1920)
- A Purple Rhododendron and Other Stories (1967)

== Filmography ==
- The Trail of the Lonesome Pine, directed by Cecil B. DeMille (1916, based on the novel The Trail of the Lonesome Pine)
- Heart o' the Hills, directed by Joseph De Grasse and Sidney Franklin (1919, based on the novel The Heart of the Hills)
- The Little Shepherd of Kingdom Come, directed by Wallace Worsley (1920, based on the novel The Little Shepherd of Kingdom Come)
- A Cumberland Romance, directed by Charles Maigne (1920, based on the novel A Mountain Europa)
- The Kentuckians, directed by Charles Maigne (1921, based on the novel The Kentuckians)
- The Trail of the Lonesome Pine, directed by Charles Maigne (1923, based on the novel The Trail of the Lonesome Pine)
- The Hill Billy, directed by George Hill (1924, based on a story by John Fox Jr.)
- The Little Shepherd of Kingdom Come, directed by Alfred Santell (1928, based on the novel The Little Shepherd of Kingdom Come)
- The Trail of the Lonesome Pine, directed by Henry Hathaway (1936, based on the novel The Trail of the Lonesome Pine)
- The Little Shepherd of Kingdom Come, directed by Andrew V. McLaglen (1961, based on the novel The Little Shepherd of Kingdom Come)
