= Jenna Elfman =

American actress (born 1971)

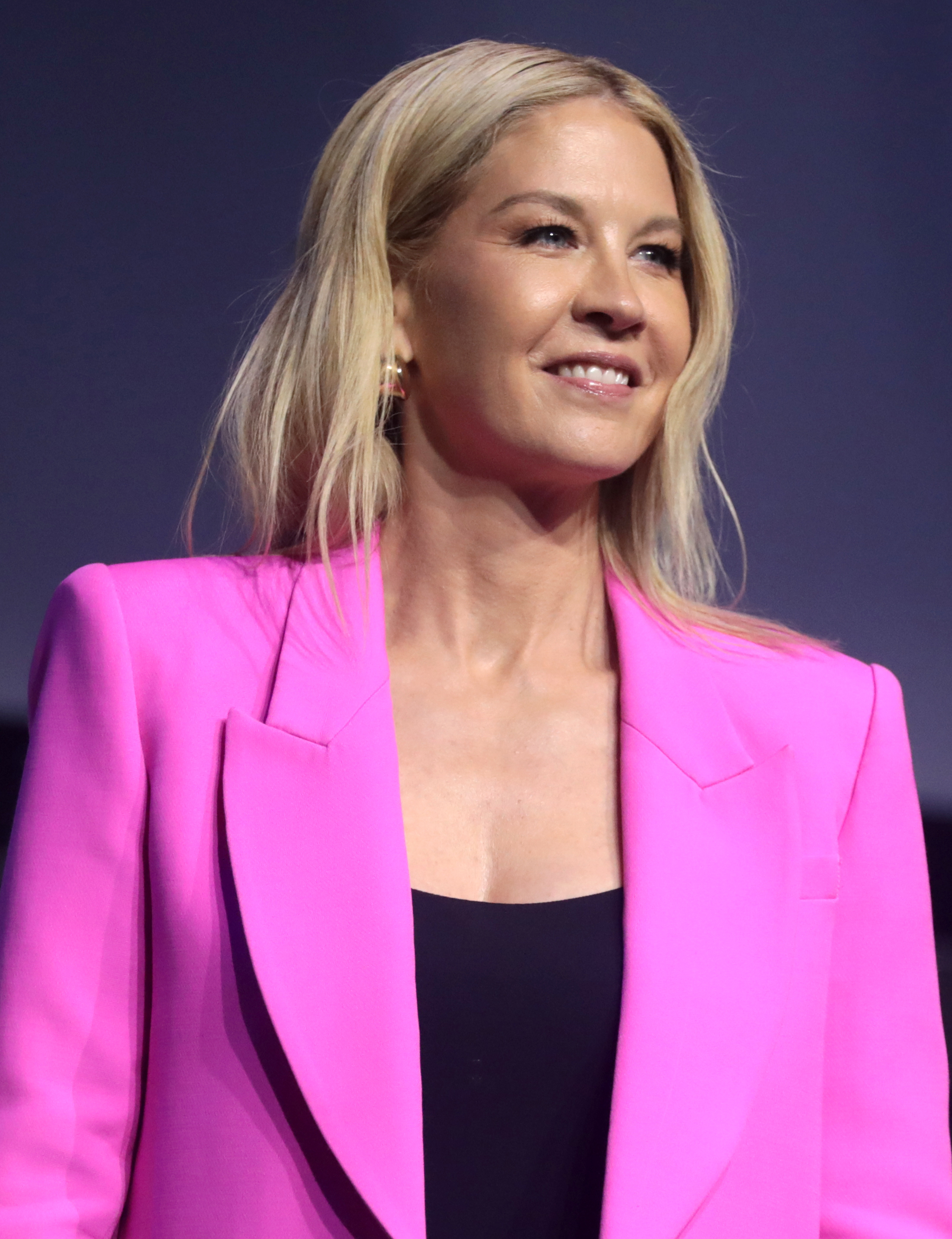
- Elfman at the 2023 WonderCon
- Born: Jennifer Mary Butala; September 30, 1971 (age 55); Los Angeles, California, U.S.
- Occupations: Actress, producer
- Years active: 1988–present
- Spouse: Bodhi Elfman (m. 1995)
- Children: 2
- Relatives: Tony Butala (paternal uncle); Danny Elfman (uncle-in-law)
- Website: jennaelfman.com

Jenna Elfman (born Jennifer Mary Butala, September 30, 1971) is an American actress. She is best known for her leading role as Dharma on the ABC sitcom Dharma & Greg (1997–2002), for which she received the Golden Globe Award for Best Actress – Television Series Musical or Comedy in 1999, and three nominations for the Primetime Emmy Award for Outstanding Lead Actress in a Comedy Series. After making her film debut in Grosse Pointe Blank (1997), she appeared in Krippendorf's Tribe (1998), Dr. Dolittle (1998), EDtv (1999), Keeping the Faith (2000), Town & Country (2001), Looney Tunes: Back in Action (2003), Clifford's Really Big Movie (2004), and Big Stone Gap (2014).

Elfman has also played leading roles in other television comedies, including Courting Alex (2006), Accidentally on Purpose (2009–2010), 1600 Penn (2012–2013), Growing Up Fisher (2014), and Imaginary Mary (2017). She had a recurring role in the FX legal drama Damages in 2012, and has been a series regular on the AMC horror drama series Fear the Walking Dead (2018–2023).

== Early life ==
Jenna Elfman was born Jennifer Mary Butala on September 30, 1971 in Northridge, California. Her father Richard was of Croatian ancestry and was an executive for Hughes Aircraft, while her mother Susan was a homemaker. Elfman was raised Roman Catholic. Her paternal uncle is Tony Butala, who was the lead singer of the American vocal trio The Lettermen. She attended St. Genevieve High School in the San Fernando Valley for a year, before eventually graduating from Los Angeles County High School for the Arts. She has also attended California State University, Northridge (CSUN) and Westside School of Ballet.

== Career ==
=== 1990–1996: Early works ===
Elfman began her professional career as a dancer, appearing in music videos for Depeche Mode ("Halo", 1990), Anthrax ("Black Lodge", 1993), and Chris Isaak ("Somebody's Crying", 1995), and touring with the rock band ZZ Top on their 1994 tour as a "Legs Girl". After appearing in television commercials, Elfman co-starred in the made-for-television movie Double Deception (1993) and guest-starred on Roseanne, NYPD Blue, Almost Perfect and Murder One. In 1996, she was cast as a lead character alongside Molly Ringwald and Lauren Graham in the short-lived ABC sitcom Townies. The series was cancelled after one season and 15 episodes. The following year, she made her big screen debut appearing in the black comedy film, Grosse Pointe Blank.

=== 1997–2002: Breakthrough ===
In 1997, Elfman was cast in the ABC comedy series Dharma & Greg playing the leading role of Dharma Freedom Finkelstein Montgomery. She received positive reviews from critics for her breakthrough performance. She won the Golden Globe Award for Best Actress – Television Series Musical or Comedy in 1999 for the show's second season, as well as three Primetime Emmy Awards nominations for the Outstanding Lead Actress in a Comedy Series. Elfman also received TCA Award for Individual Achievement in Comedy nomination in 1998, as well as three Satellite Award for Best Actress – Television Series Musical or Comedy nominations. The show ran for five seasons until its cancellation in 2002.

During her time on Dharma & Greg, Elfman starred in a number of films. In 1998, she starred alongside Richard Dreyfuss in the comedy film Krippendorf's Tribe. The film received generally negative reviews from critics. In 1999, she starred opposite Matthew McConaughey in the satirical comedy film EDtv. The film received mixed-to-positive reviews, with some criticizing its similarity to The Truman Show (1998), but was a box office flop, grossing only $35.2 million compared to its $80 million production budget. The following year, she starred in the romantic comedy film Keeping the Faith opposite Ben Stiller and Edward Norton (who also directed). The film received generally positive reviews and grossed $60 million. Elfman received Satellite Award for Best Actress – Motion Picture Musical or Comedy nomination for her performance. In 2001, she appeared in the romantic comedy film Town & Country, a $105 million production budget box office bomb. The film was filmed in 1998, and after 12 release date changes, the film finally made it into theaters on April 27, 2001, nearly three years after filming began. It received negative reviews from critics. Elfman has also done voice-over work in the animated films Dr. Dolittle (1998) and CyberWorld (2000).

=== 2003–present ===
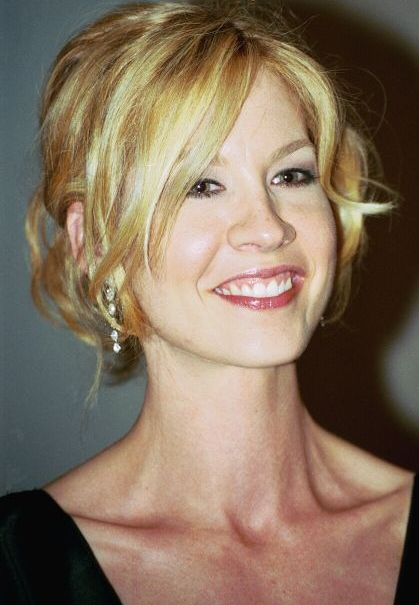
Elfman in 2000

After Dharma & Greg, Elfman played against the type role as a psychotic woman in the made-for-television thriller film, Obsessed (2002). She received positive review from Chicago Tribune for her performance. In 2003, she starred in the live-action/animated comedy film, Looney Tunes: Back in Action. The film received mixed to positive reviews from critics and was a box-office bomb, grossing $68.5 million worldwide on an $80 million budget. In 2005, she starred and produced the romantic drama film Touched.

In 2006, Elfman returned to television with the leading role in the CBS sitcom, Courting Alex. The series was cancelled after one season. She guest-starred on Two and a Half Men, My Name Is Earl and Brothers & Sisters. In 2009, she appeared in the comedy films The Six Wives of Henry Lefay and Love Hurts. In 2011, she had a supporting role in the romantic comedy film Friends with Benefits, and in 2012 she and her husband Bodhi launched a podcast called Kicking and Screaming by Jenna and Bodhi Elfman.

Elfman starred in another short-lived CBS sitcom, Accidentally on Purpose during the 2009–10 season. In 2012, she took a recurring role in the FX legal thriller series, Damages. In 2013, Elfman starred in the NBC comedy series, 1600 Penn and later in Growing Up Fisher, which were each cancelled after a single season. She starred in the romantic comedy film, Big Stone Gap (2014) opposite Ashley Judd, and appeared in the drama film Barry about Barack Obama's life at Columbia University in 1981. In 2017, she starred in another one-season sitcom, Imaginary Mary on ABC. Like 1600 Penn and Growing Up Fisher, the series was cancelled after its first season.

In 2018, Elfman was cast in the AMC horror drama series, Fear the Walking Dead playing the mysterious nurse June "Naomi / Laura" Dorie. She made her debut in the fourth season and stayed on the show to the eighth and final season. The series ended in 2023. In 2020, she starred in an episode of the horror anthology series, The Twilight Zone. She later guest-starred on the ABC crime drama Will Trent and the AMC thriller Dark Winds. In 2025, she made her return to sitcoms with the recurring role in the ABC comedy series, Shifting Gears.

== Personal life ==
In February 1991, Jenna Elfman met the actor Bodhi Pine Elfman (né Saboff) during an audition for a Sprite commercial. They were married on February 18, 1995. Jenna was raised Catholic, and Bodhi is of Jewish descent. The couple have two children.

=== Scientology ===
Elfman was introduced to the Church of Scientology by her husband, and she is now a practicing member. By 2001 she had attained the State of Clear, and by 2020 she was on the OT VII level. Since the early 1990s Elfman had studied acting with the prominent acting teacher and long-time Scientologist Milton Katselas, but cut ties with him in 2004 after he fell out of favor with Scientology. In 2001, Elfman opened a Scientology mission in San Francisco.

In 2005, she appeared at the grand opening of Psychiatry: An Industry of Death, a museum sponsored by the Citizens Commission on Human Rights. On May 24, 2006, Elfman was the keynote speaker at the Human Rights Hero Award event in participation with the Scientology-affiliated groups Youth for Human Rights International and Artists for Human Rights (AFHR). On March 27, 2008, she and actor Charlie Sheen co-hosted the Scientology-affiliated New York Rescue Workers Detoxification Project charity event at Geisha House in Hollywood.

=== Philanthropy ===
Elfman has participated in philanthropic activities, including donating an hour of her time for auction, donating a print of her lips, participating in a telethon fundraiser, hosting a comedy show, and asking for charity donations instead of birthday presents.

Elfman participated in awareness-raising initiatives, including modeling for a fashion show, reading to schoolchildren as part of the National Education Association Read Across America program, and hosting a party in her home to raise awareness for causes headed by the Environmental Working Group.

Elfman is on the advisory board of American Dance Movement (formerly Dizzy Feet Foundation).

== Filmography ==
=== Film ===
Year	Title	Role	Notes
1997	Grosse Pointe Blank	Tanya	
1998	Dr. Dolittle	Owl	Voice
1998	Can't Hardly Wait	The Angel	Uncredited
1998	Krippendorf's Tribe	Prof. Veronica Micelli	
1999	EDtv	Shari	
1999	Venus	Venus	
2000	The Tangerine Bear	Lorelei	Voice
2000	CyberWorld	Phig	Voice
2000	Keeping the Faith	Anna Riley	
2001	Town & Country	Auburn	
2003	Looney Tunes: Back in Action	Kate Houghton	
2004	Clifford's Really Big Movie	Dorothy	Voice
2005	Touched	Angela Martin	Executive producer
2005	What's Hip, Doc?	Supermodel	Voice – uncompleted short
2008	Struck	Pregnant date	Short film
2009	The Six Wives of Henry Lefay	Ophelia	
2009	Love Hurts	Darlene	
2011	Friends with Benefits	Annie	
2014	Big Stone Gap	Miss Iva Lou Wade	
2016	Barry	Kathy Baughman	

=== Television ===
Year	Title	Role	Notes
1992	Murder, She Wrote	Ballet Dancer in background	Uncredited; Episode: "Dance Diabolique"
1993	Double Deception	Lisa Majorski	Television film
1994	The George Carlin Show	Psychedelic girl	As Jenna Butala; Episode: "George Does A Bad Thing"
1995	The Monroes	Lily	Episode: "Bottoms, Up"
1995	Roseanne	Garland	Episode: "The Getaway, Almost"
1996	Her Last Chance	Leslie	Television film
1996	Townies	Shannon Canotis	Main role; 15 episodes
1996	Murder One	Angela Scalese	Episode: "Chapter Seventeen"
1996	Almost Perfect	Becky Toll	Episode: "Being Fired Means Never Having to Say You're Sorry"
1996	NYPD Blue	Patty Snow	Episode: "The Nutty Confessor"
1997	The Single Guy	Jordan	Episode: "Just Friends?"
1997–2002	Dharma & Greg	Dharma Freedom Finkelstein Montgomery	Main role; 119 episodes
2002	Obsessed	Ellena Roberts	Television film
2004–2011	Two and a Half Men	Frankie / Dharma Montgomery	3 episodes
2006	Courting Alex	Alex Rose	Main role; 13 episodes
2007	Brothers & Sisters	Lizzie Jones-Baker	Episode: "Game Night"
2008	My Name Is Earl	Kimmi Himmler	Episode: "We've Got Spirit"
2009–2010	Accidentally on Purpose	Billie Chase	Main role; 18 episodes
2012	Shameless	Jill	Episode: "Fiona Interrupted"
2012	Damages	Naomi Walling	7 episodes
2012–2013	1600 Penn	Emily Nash Gilchrist	Main role; 13 episodes
2013	Royal Pains	Lacy	Episode: "Open Invitation"
2014	Growing Up Fisher	Joyce Fisher	Main role; 13 episodes
2014	So You Think You Can Dance	Herself	Guest judge
2015	The Perfect Stanleys	Ellen	Television film
2017	Imaginary Mary	Alice	Main role; 9 episodes
2018–2023	Fear the Walking Dead	June "Naomi / Laura" Dorie	Main role; 48 episodes
2018–2021	Talking Dead	Herself	6 episodes
2020	The Twilight Zone	Barbara	Episode: "A Human Face"
2024	Will Trent	Edie Reynolds	Episode: "Cpt. Duke Wagner"
2025	Shifting Gears	Eve Drake	10 episodes
2025	Dark Winds	Agent Sylvia Washington	8 episodes

=== Music videos ===
Year	Song	Artist
1990	"Halo"	Depeche Mode

== Accolades ==
Association	Year	Category	Nominated work	Results	Ref
American Comedy Awards	1999	Funniest Female Performer in a TV Series (Leading Role) Network, Cable or Syndication	Dharma & Greg	Nominated	
Blockbuster Entertainment Awards	2001	Favorite Actress — Comedy/Romance	Keeping the Faith	Nominated	
Golden Globes	1998	Best Performance by an Actress in a Television Series — Musical or Comedy	Dharma & Greg	Nominated	
Golden Globes	1999	Best Performance by an Actress in a Television Series — Musical or Comedy	Dharma & Greg	Won	
Golden Globes	2000	Best Performance by an Actress in a Television Series — Musical or Comedy	Dharma & Greg	Nominated	
Golden Apple Awards	1998	Female Discovery of the Year	—N/a	Won	
Online Film & Television Association	1998	Best Actress in a Comedy Series	Dharma & Greg	Nominated	
Online Film & Television Association	1999	Best Actress in a Comedy Series	Dharma & Greg	Nominated	
Primetime Emmy Awards	1998	Outstanding Lead Actress in a Comedy Series	Dharma & Greg	Nominated	
Primetime Emmy Awards	1999	Outstanding Lead Actress in a Comedy Series	Dharma & Greg	Nominated	
Primetime Emmy Awards	2000	Outstanding Lead Actress in a Comedy Series	Dharma & Greg	Nominated	
Satellite Awards	2000	Best Actress in a Series, Comedy or Musical	Dharma & Greg	Nominated	
Satellite Awards	2001	Best Actress in a Series, Comedy or Musical	Dharma & Greg	Nominated	
Satellite Awards	2001	Best Actress in a Motion Picture, Comedy or Musical	Keeping the Faith	Nominated	
Satellite Awards	2002	Satellite Award for Best Actress – Television Series Musical or Comedy	Dharma & Greg	Nominated	
TCA Awards	1998	Individual Achievement in Comedy	Dharma & Greg	Nominated	
TV Guide Awards	1999	Favorite Actress in a Comedy	Dharma & Greg	Won	
TV Guide Awards	2000	Favorite Actress in a Comedy	Dharma & Greg	Won	
TV Guide Awards	2001	Favorite Actress in a Comedy	Dharma & Greg	Nominated	
Viewers for Quality Television Awards	1998	Best Actress in a Quality Comedy Series	Dharma & Greg	Nominated	
Viewers for Quality Television Awards	1999	Best Actress in a Quality Comedy Series	Dharma & Greg	Nominated	
