= The Trail of the Lonesome Pine (1923 film) =

1923 film

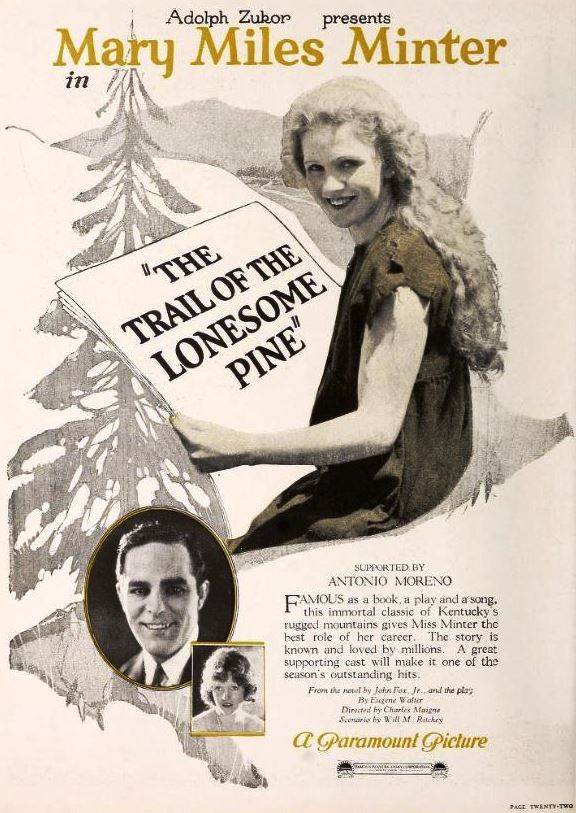
- Advertisement
- Directed by: Charles Maigne
- Written by: Eugene Walter (adaptation)
- Screenplay by: Will M. Ritchey
- Based on: The Trail of the Lonesome Pine by John Fox, Jr.
- Starring: Mary Miles Minter
- Cinematography: James Howe
- Production company: Famous Players–Lasky
- Distributed by: Paramount Pictures
- Release date: April 15, 1923
- Running time: 6 reels
- Country: United States
- Languages: Silent; English intertitles

The Trail of the Lonesome Pine is a 1923 American silent Western film directed by Charles Maigne and starring Mary Miles Minter. It was adapted by Will M. Ritchey from the play and novel of the same name by John Fox Jr. This was the second time that Maigne had directed Minter in an adaptation of a Fox novel, the first being 1920's A Cumberland Romance. This was Minter's final film; her contract with Paramount Pictures was not renewed, and she stated that she was "through" with films. As with many of Minter's features, The Trail of the Lonesome Pine is thought to be a lost film.

== Plot ==
As described in various film magazine reviews, June Tolliver is a girl of the Kentucky mountains, whose clan has been feuding with the Falins for generations. When engineer John Hale comes to the mountains to aid in the development of the coal and iron industries, June falls in love with the handsome "furriner" (foreigner).

Hale sends June away to the city, funding her education with the intention of marrying her on her return. In the meantime the feud between the clans deepens, and Hale, having been made a deputy, is keen not to take sides despite his love for June.

The day that June returns from the city, her education complete, her uncle Rufe Tolliver is arrested for the killing of a policeman. June is called upon as a witness, and although her clan expect her to remain loyal to them, she does not lie.

June's father Judd Tolliver, the leader of the clan, vows that he will not see a relative hanged. Instead, he arranges to have Rufe shot on the way to his execution, and in the ensuing chaos Hale is also wounded. June intervenes to beg for peace between the clans, and when Hale recovers, he and June are wed.

== Cast ==
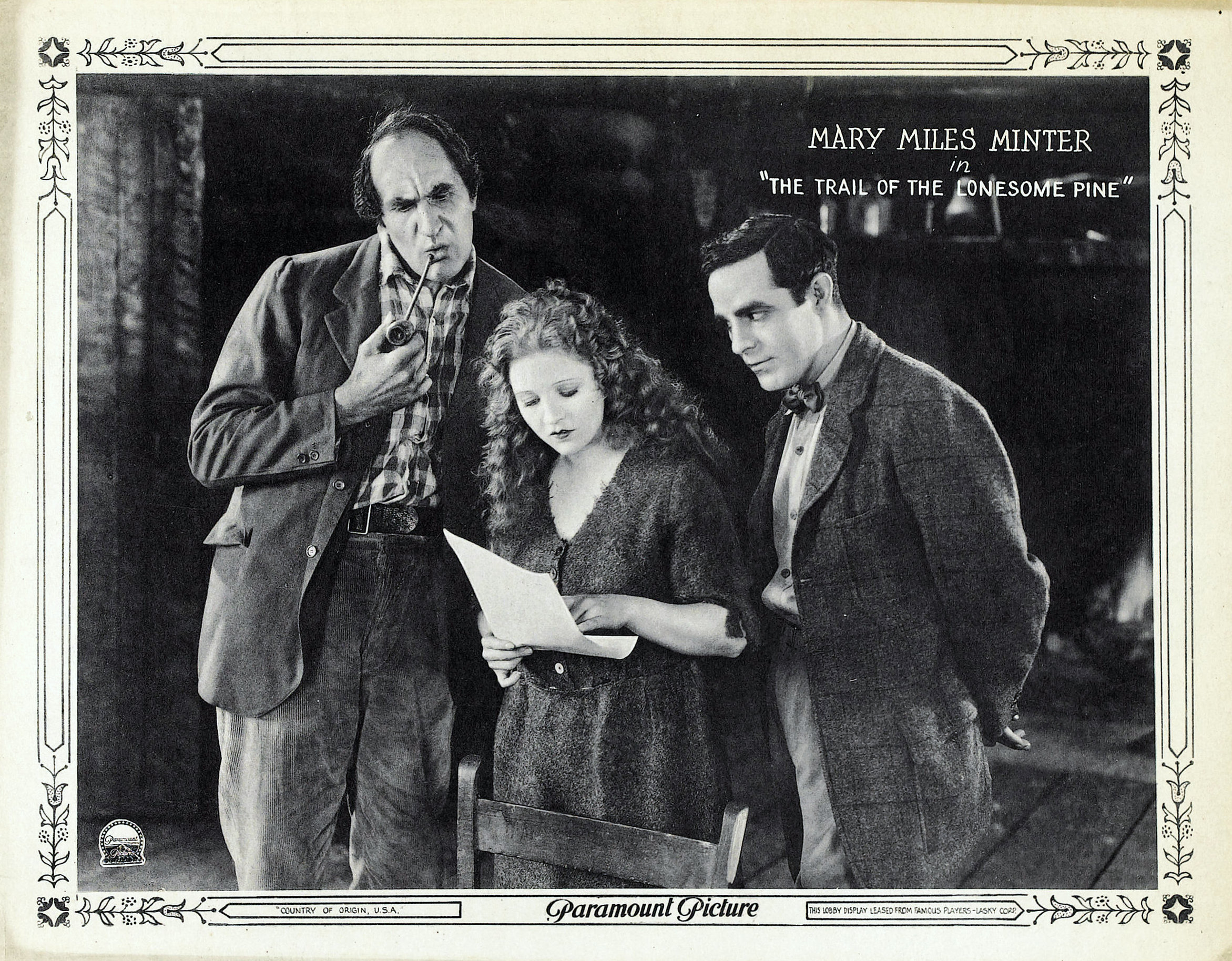
Lobby Card

- Mary Miles Minter as June Tolliver
- Antonio Moreno as John Hale
- Ernest Torrence as 'Devil' Judd Tolliver
- Ed Brady as 'Bad' Rufe Tolliver (as Edwin J. Brady)
- Frances Warner as Ann
- J. S. Stembridge as Buck Falin
- Cullen Tate as Dave Tolliver

== Production ==
The Trail of the Lonesome Pine was the second film on which cinematographer James Wong Howe earned his reputation leading him to become one of the most sought cinematographer of the era. Listed as first camera, essentially, Howe was considered the director of photography. Specifically, Howe made Mary Miles Minter's blue eyes register on orthochromatic film with a filter. With the success evident in Howe's work, especially in lighting, "every blue-eyed actor and actress wanted him as their photographer."

== Other adaptions ==
The novel was first adapted for the screen in 1914 starring Dixie Compton. In 1916, a second adaptation, directed by Cecil B. DeMille, was released. The novel was adapted for the fourth time in 1936, directed by Henry Hathaway and starring Fred MacMurray, Sylvia Sidney and Henry Fonda.
