= Stony Point, Kentucky =

Unincorporated community in Kentucky, United States

Coordinates: 38°07′14″N 84°11′38″W

Stony Point is an unincorporated community in Bourbon County, Kentucky, United States.

== History ==
Stony Point was a station on the Kentucky Central Railroad. A post office was established at Stony Point in 1858, and remained in operation until it was discontinued in 1892.
