= The Trail of the Lonesome Pine (1936 film) =

1936 film

- 1936 theatrical poster
- Directed by: Henry Hathaway
- Written by: Grover Jones; Horace McCoy
- Screenplay by: Harvey F. Thew
- Based on: The Trail of the Lonesome Pine (1908 novel) by John Fox Jr.
- Produced by: Walter Wanger
- Starring: Fred MacMurray; Sylvia Sidney; Henry Fonda
- Cinematography: Robert C. Bruce; W. Howard Greene
- Edited by: Robert Bischoff
- Music by: Gerard Carbonara; Hugo Friedhofer
- Production company: Walter Wanger Productions
- Distributed by: Paramount Pictures
- Release dates: February 19, 1936 (New York City); March 13, 1936
- Running time: 102 minutes
- Country: United States
- Language: English
- Budget: $621,864
- Box office: $1.7 million

The Trail of the Lonesome Pine is a 1936 American romantic Western film directed by Henry Hathaway for Paramount Pictures, and starring Fred MacMurray, Sylvia Sidney and Henry Fonda. It is based on the 1908 novel by John Fox Jr., the fourth such adaptation, and centers on a pair of star-crossed lovers in the Eastern Kentucky Coalfield.

This was the second full-length feature film to be shot in three-strip Technicolor and the first in color to be shot outdoors, with the approval of the Technicolor Corporation. Much of it was shot at Big Bear Lake in southern California. The film was premiered on February 19, 1936, and was released by Paramount on March 13, 1936 to positive reviews and commercial success.

== Plot ==
Deep in the region of the Eastern Kentucky Coalfield, a feud between the Kentucky clans of the Tollivers and the Falins has been ongoing for as long as anyone can recall. After an engineer, Jack Hale, arrives with coal and railroad interests, he saves the life of Dave Tolliver, whose injury has developed gangrene.

Dave expects to marry a cousin, June, but she takes an immediate shine to the newcomer. Her younger brother Buddie is also impressed with Hale, who begins to educate him and take the boy under his wing. But others from both families do not give this outsider their trust.

Upset over the budding romance, Dave sets out after Hale with a rifle but is ambushed by the Falins. The latest round of violence causes June not to want to return home, so Hale sends her to Louisville to live with his sister.

A bridge is destroyed by the Falins, causing the accidental death of Buddie. A funeral is held and June returns, newly sophisticated from being in the big city. Family patriarch Buck Falin extends his apologies about her brother. Dave, however, is shot in the back by Wade Falin.

The families agree that the feud has gone too far. Hale is befriended by all, and will happily marry June.

== Cast ==
- Fred MacMurray as Jack Hale
- Sylvia Sidney as June Tolliver
- Henry Fonda as Dave Tolliver
- Fred Stone as Judd Tolliver
- Nigel Bruce as Thurber
- Beulah Bondi as Melissa
- Robert Barrat as Buck Falin
- George "Spanky" McFarland as Buddie Tolliver
- Fuzzy Knight as Tater
- Otto Fries as Corsey
- Samuel S. Hinds as Sheriff
- Alan Baxter as Clay Tolliver
- Fern Emmett as Lena Tolliver
- Margaret Armstrong and Ricca Allen as Tolliver family members

== Production ==
The Trail of the Lonesome Pine was the fourth feature film adaptation of John Fox Jr.'s 1908 novel, including 1916 and 1923 silent versions. As with the novel, the film makes extensive use of Appalachian English in the dialogue.

With principal on-location photography beginning in October 9, 1935 in Chatsworth, at Big Bear Lake (in the San Bernardino Mountains), and at the Santa Susana Pass in California, recreating the rural and mountain locale of the novel. The film was the first feature-length film to be shot in three-strip Technicolor on location. Production on the film ended on December 14, 1935.

Director Henry Hathaway was borrowed from Paramount. In an interview with James Bawden in 1976, Fonda remembered carving “HF LUVS SS” on a tree during the production of this film. Director Henry Hathaway found it when shooting Woman Obsessed there in 1959.

Considered a technological success, The Trail of the Lonesome Pine was not the first film to utilize the new color process but integrated its use successfully, and was a harbinger of future developments. The New York Times critic Frank Nugent wrote in 1936:

"The significance of this achievement is not to be minimized. It means that color need not shackle the cinema, but may give it fuller expression. It means that we can doubt no longer the inevitability of the color film or scoff at those who believe that black-and-white photography is tottering on the brink of that limbo of forgotten things which already has swallowed the silent picture."

== Reception ==
The Trail of the Lonesome Pine received positive critical acclaim, with Frank Nugent of The New York Times considering the film significant yet not without flaws. "Paramount's new film is far from perfect, either as a photoplay or as an instrument for the use of the new three-component Technicolor process", although "a cast of unusual merit and a richly beautiful color production" were its redeeming qualities. Writing for The Spectator in 1936, Graham Greene gave the film a neutral review. While criticizing the use of Technicolor here as "just bad bright picture-postcard stuff", Greene praised the story as "quite a good one" and singled out Sylvia Sidney for her charming performance.

The film made a profit of $522,620.

=== Awards and honors ===
Two original songs from the film, both written by composer Louis Alter and lyricist Sidney D. Mitchell and sung by Fuzzy Knight, gained national prominence. "A Melody from the Sky" was nominated for the 1937 Academy Award for Best Original Song. The other song, "Twilight on the Trail", became a popular hit and eventually something of a classic. It inspired a 1941 film of the same name and has been recorded by numerous country, pop, rock and soul singers.

Trail of the Lonesome Pine was recognized at the 4th Venice International Film Festival for a "Special Recommendation" for the use of color film, and was nominated for Best Foreign Film but lost to Der Kaiser von Kalifornien.

== See also ==
- List of early color feature films
