= Appalachia Elementary School =

Location
- 3965 Kent Junction Road; Appalachia, Virginia 24216; United States
- Coordinates: 36°54′31.1″N 82°46′22.2″W

Information
- School type: Public, elementary school
- School district: Wise County Public Schools
- Superintendent: Jeff Perry
- Principal: Matthew Dysart
- Grades: Pre-K-8
- Enrollment: 395 (2009)
- Language: English
- Colors: Royal Blue and Gold
- Mascot: Bulldogs
- Website: Official Site

Appalachia Elementary School, located in Appalachia, Virginia is part of Wise County Public Schools. Appalachia Elementary has educated approximately 395 students ranging from pre-kindergarten through 8th grade. The school formally closed May 19, 2017. The building has been repurposed by Mountain Empire Community College (MECC) and currently houses MECC's Center for Workforce and Innovation of Appalachia (CWIA). The CWIA houses MECC’s Project Amelioration, a program designed to assist justice impacted and addiction impacted individuals in the region with education and training in the trades. The CWIA also houses MECC’s expanded power lineman and commercial driver’s license (CDL) programs, dental assisting, various building trades, a welding fabrication lab, flexible bay customized workforce training space, SMART farming UAS agricultural programming, community wellness courses, certified nurse aid programing, and is a Pearson VUE testing center. Credentials offered at the CWIA include, NCCER Power Lineman, Commercial Drivers License, OSHA, NCCER Core Basic, DOT Traffic Control, Forklift Operations, Fiber Optic Installation, General Mineral Miner Certification, Central Mix Aggregates Certification, Certified Blaster, ServSafe Food Handler, ServSafe Food Manager, Underground Power Distribution, Behind-the-Wheel Driving Permit, NCCER Welding, HVAC, Electrical Trades and Plumbing. Since opening the CWIA in 2019, 1350 credentials have been earned by more than 400 students at the CWIA, and MECC has offered over 40 community education, workforce, and cultural programs at the CWIA. Mountain Empire Community College (MECC) employs nearly 150 professional full-time faculty and staff members and serves over 3,000 students each year.
