= The Trail of the Lonesome Pine (1916 film) =

1916 film

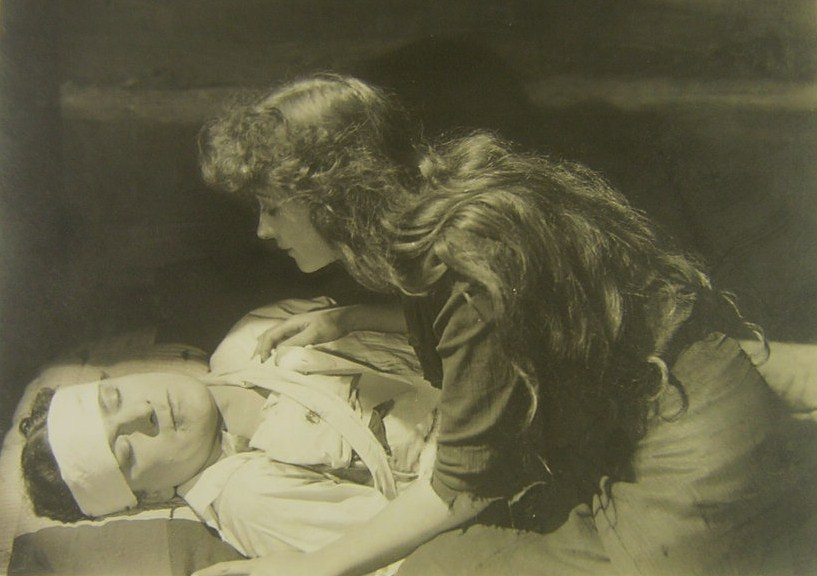
- Thomas Meighan and Charlotte Walker
- Directed by: Cecil B. DeMille
- Story by: Cecil B. DeMille
- Based on: The Trail of the Lonesome Pine (1908 novel) by: John Fox, Jr.; and the 1912 play by Eugene Walter
- Produced by: Jesse L. Lasky
- Starring: Charlotte Walker
- Cinematography: Alvin Wyckoff
- Edited by: Cecil B. DeMille
- Release date: February 13, 1916
- Running time: 50 minutes
- Country: United States
- Languages: Silent; English intertitles

The Trail of the Lonesome Pine is a 1916 American silent drama film directed by Cecil B. DeMille, who also wrote the screenplay. Art direction for the film was done by Wilfred Buckland.

It is based on the 1908 novel and the 1912 play of the same name by Eugene Walter. Charlotte Walker reprised her role from the Broadway production.

== Cast ==
- Charlotte Walker as June Tolliver
- Thomas Meighan as Jack Hale
- Earle Foxe as Dave Tolliver (credited as Earle Fox)
- Theodore Roberts as "Devil" Judd Tolliver
- Dick L'Estrange as Bob Heaton (credited as Dick Lestrange)
- Park Jones as Tompkins
- Lorraine Collett

== Other adaptions ==
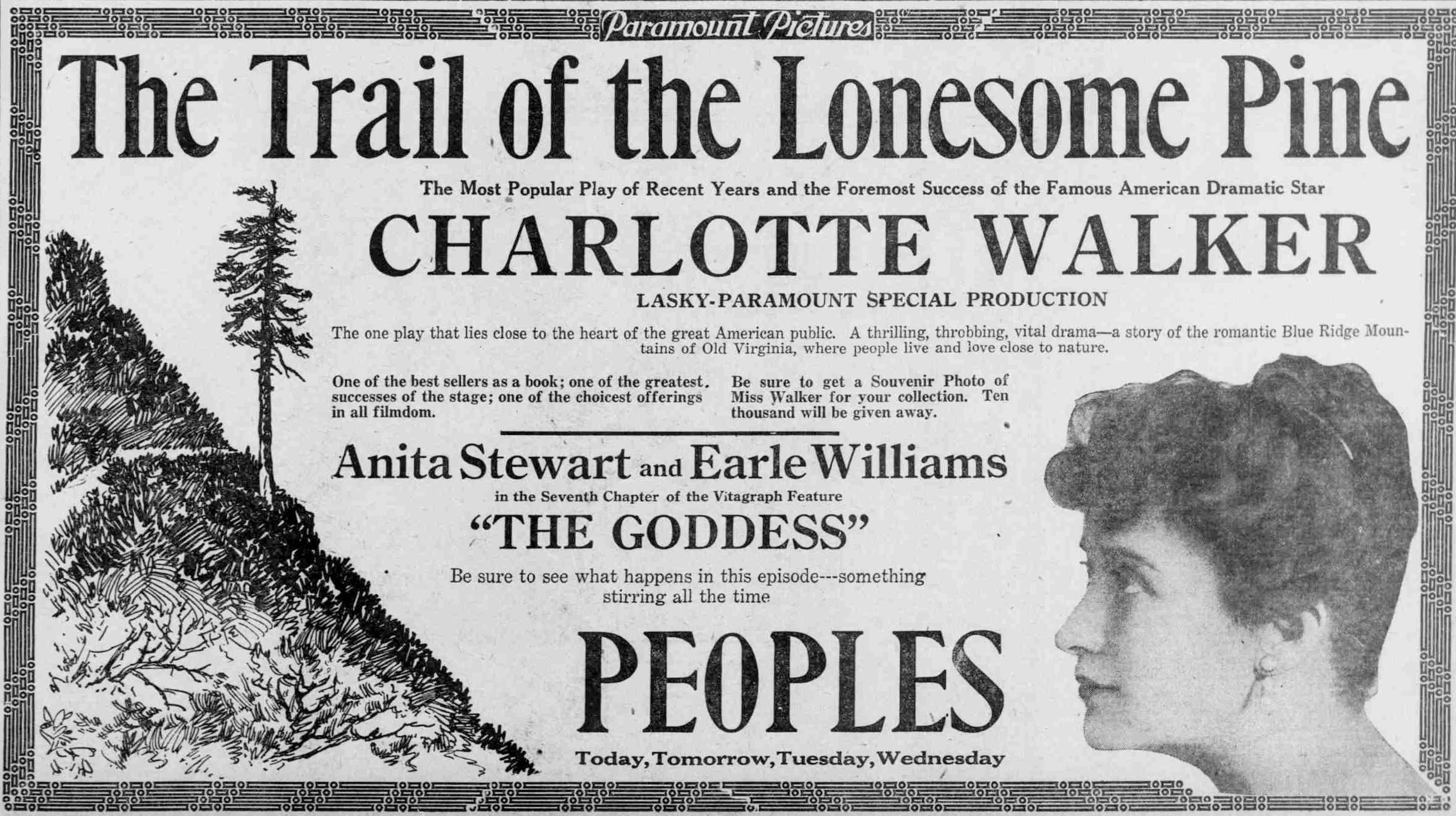
Ad in The Sunday Oregonian of February 20, 1916

The novel was first adapted for the screen in 1914, and starred Dixie Compton. Another version released in 1923 starred Mary Miles Minter and is now considered a lost film. The novel was adapted for the fourth time in 1936, an early Technicolor version starring Fred MacMurray, Sylvia Sidney, and Henry Fonda.

The Trail Of The Lonesome Pine (1916)

== Preservation ==
Complete 35 mm prints of The Trail of the Lonesome Pine are held by the Library of Congress and the George Eastman Museum in Rochester, New York.
