= The Trail of the Lonesome Pine (novel) =

1908 romance/western novel by John Fox, Jr.

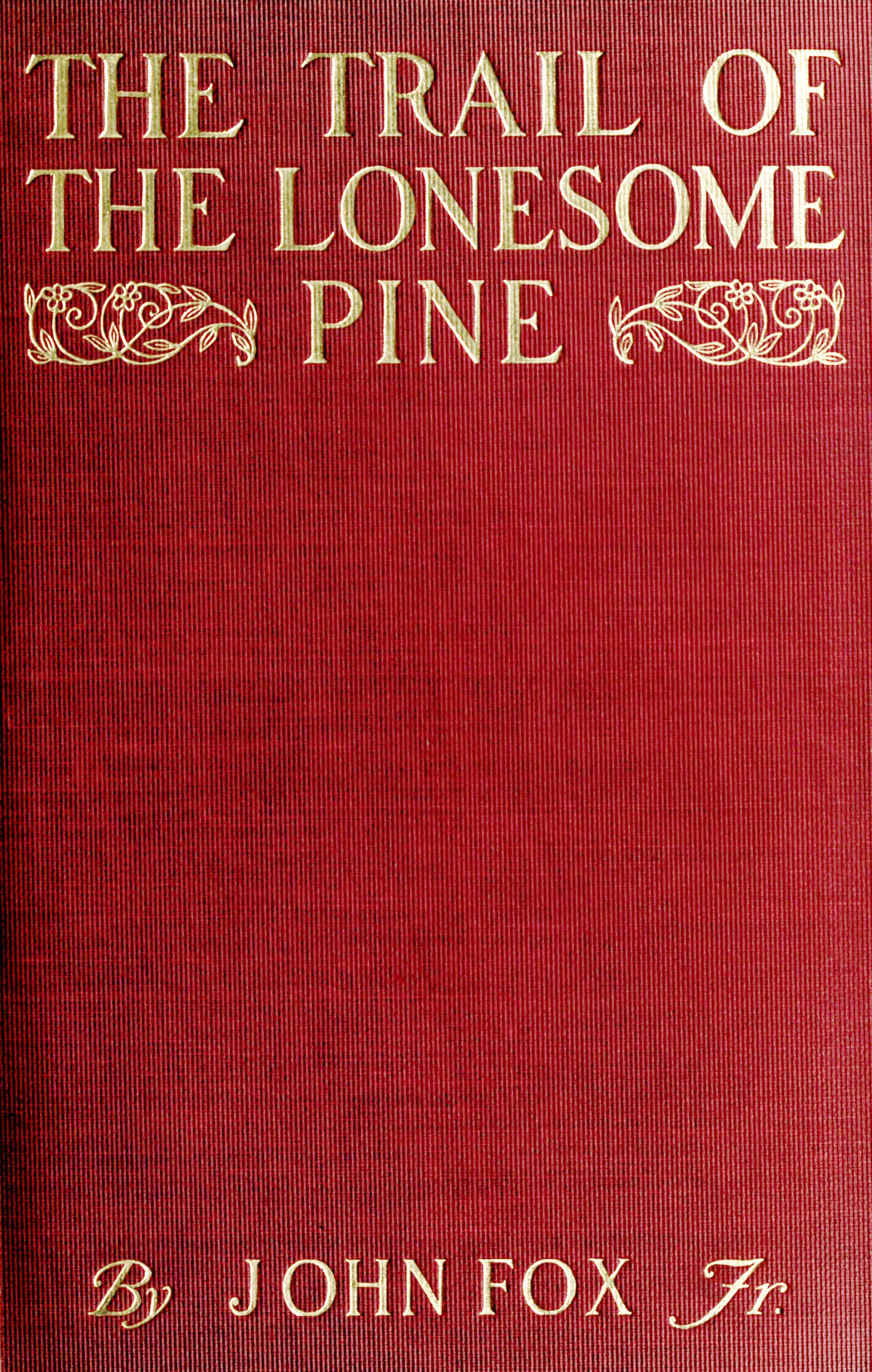
- First edition cover
- Author: John Fox, Jr.
- Language: English
- Genre: Western, Romance
- Publisher: Charles Scribner's Sons
- Publication date: 1908
- Publication place: United States
- Media type: Print (hardback)
- Pages: 223 pp

The Trail of the Lonesome Pine is a 1908 romance novel/western novel by John Fox, Jr. The novel became Fox's most successful, and was included among the top ten list of bestselling novels for 1908 and 1909. It has been adapted many times for stage and screen.

== Plot summary ==
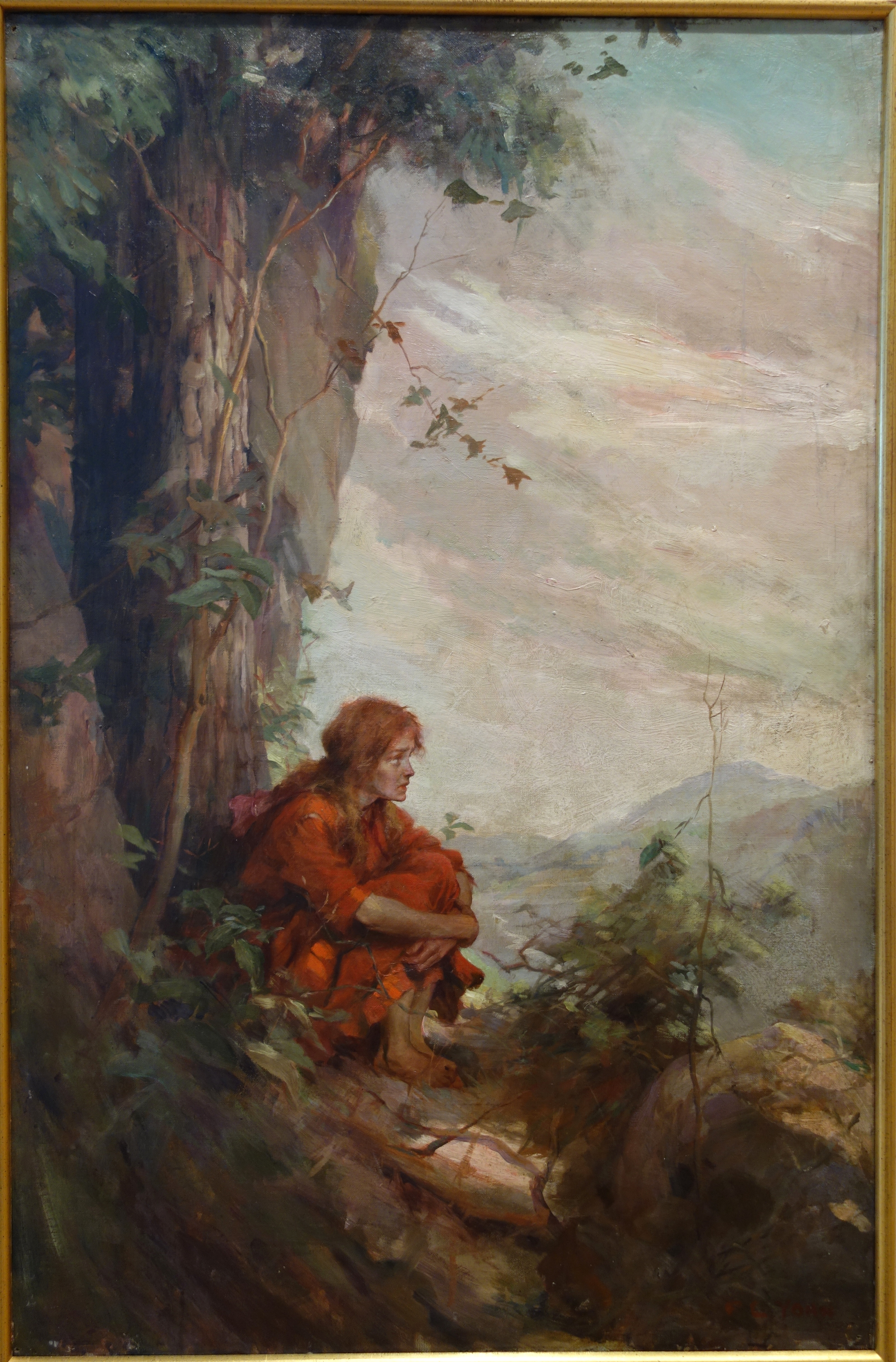
She Had Never Been Up There Before..., by Frederick Coffay Yohn, c. 1906, published in The Trail of the Lonesome Pine by John Fox, Jr., Scribner's, 1908 - New Britain Museum of American Art

Set in the Appalachian Mountains at the turn of the twentieth century, a feud has been boiling for over thirty years between two influential mountain families, the Tollivers and the Falins. The character of Devil Judd Tolliver in the novel was based on the real life of "Devil John" Wesley Wright, a United States Marshal for the region in and around Wise County, Virginia, and Letcher County, Kentucky. The outside world and industrialization, however, are beginning to enter the area. Coal mining begins to exert its influence on the area, despite the two families' feuds. Entering the area, enterprising "furriner" (foreigner) geologist John Hale captures the attention of the beautiful June Tolliver, and inadvertently becomes entangled in the region's politics.

Geologist Hale has a vision for the potential wealth of the natural raw materials, especially coal, that he intends to use as a means of creating a legacy for himself and the Gap. But he also has an eye for the young natural beauty of a mountain girl, June Tolliver, whom he feels compelled to free from the confines of mountain life and introduce to higher education.

The coming boom time for the region requires Hale to establish authoritative law and order. This authority is rejected by the two feuding clans. It is this conflict between clans that threatens to destroy the budding romance between June and the principled Hale. June must choose between clan loyalties and the man she loves.

== Adaptations ==
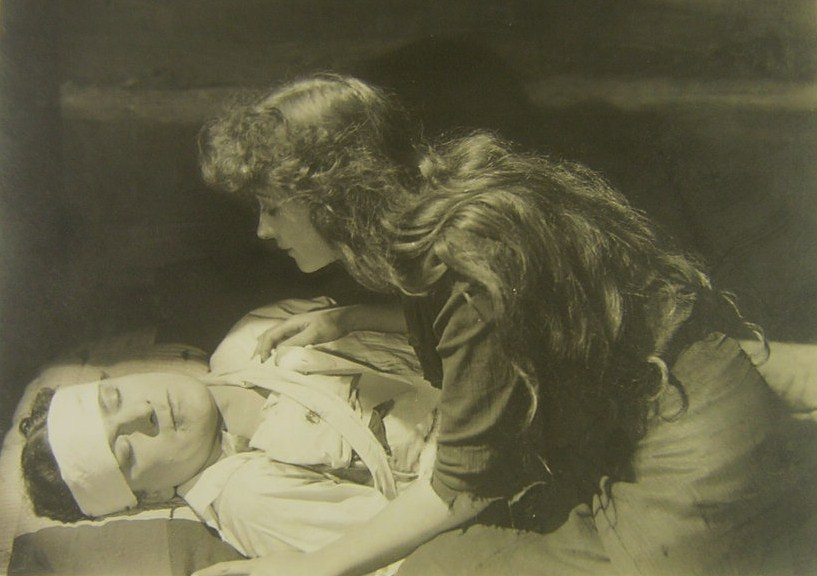
Reprising her 1912 Broadway role, Charlotte Walker starred with Thomas Meighan in the 1916 film The Trail of the Lonesome Pine.

The Trail of the Lonesome Pine was first adapted for the stage by Eugene Walter. The 1912 Broadway production starred Berton Churchill and Walter's wife, Charlotte Walker. An adaptation was filmed in 1914. In the 1916 film adaptation directed by Cecil B. DeMille, Charlotte Walker reprised her Broadway role, starring with Thomas Meighan. A 1923 film adaptation starring Mary Miles Minter and Antonio Moreno is considered a lost film.

A 1936 motion picture was directed by Henry Hathaway. Starring Sylvia Sidney, Henry Fonda, and Fred MacMurray, the film was nominated for an Academy Award for Best Original Song for Louis Alter and Sidney D. Mitchell's "A Melody From The Sky." It was also awarded the Venice Film Festival Award for Best Color Film. Hathaway's version marked the first time the Technicolor process was used for outdoor filmmaking.

The 1916 DeMille adaptation features an additional plot angle of Hale being a revenue agent seeking out "moonshiners." It also omitted much of the subplot concerning the Falin family. Henry Hathaway's 1936 version, which was the first feature film to be filmed outdoors in full (three-strip) Technicolor, remains relatively faithful to the original novel.

The novel was adapted into a successful stage play by Earl Hobson Smith and Clara Lou Kelly. Since 1964, the play has been performed in an outdoor theater in Big Stone Gap, Virginia, the hometown of the novel's author. It is considered the longest running outdoor drama in the United States and was designated the "official outdoor drama" by the Commonwealth of Virginia in 1994.

== See also ==
- June Tolliver House
- "The Trail of the Lonesome Pine" (song)
