= The Little Shepherd of Kingdom Come (novel) =

1903 Kentucky Civil War novel by John Fox Jr

The Little Shepherd of Kingdom Come is a 1903 Kentucky Civil War novel by John Fox Jr. It was serialized in Scribner's Magazine in the summer of 1903, and the book edition published later that year. The novel tells the rags-to-respectability tale of orphan Chad Buford. It was the first novel to sell a million copies in the US. Fox's depiction of black characters was held against it from the 1960s.

== Film versions ==
- The Little Shepherd of Kingdom Come, 1920 film
- The Little Shepherd of Kingdom Come, 1928 film
- The Little Shepherd of Kingdom Come, 1961 film

== See also ==
- Kingdom Come State Park
