= The Little Shepherd of Kingdom Come (1920 film) =

1920 film

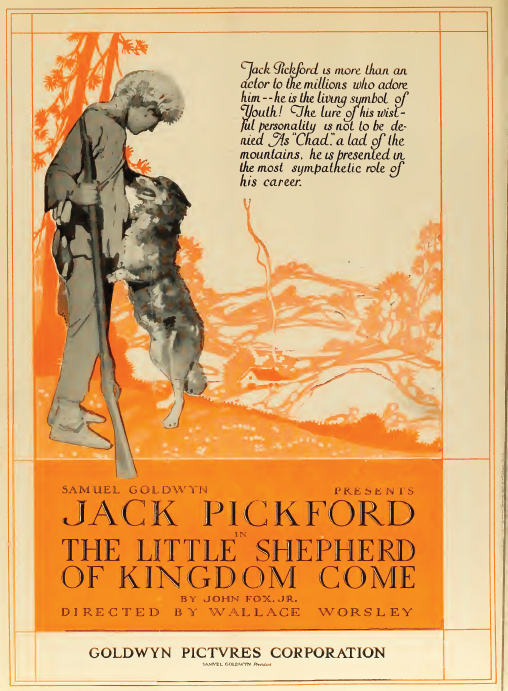
- Directed by: Wallace Worsley
- Written by: Elliott Clawson; Harvey Thew
- Based on: the novel by John Fox Jr.
- Produced by: Samuel Goldwyn
- Starring: Jack Pickford
- Cinematography: Donovan Short(aka Don Short)
- Edited by: Frank E. Hull
- Distributed by: Goldwyn Pictures
- Release date: February 1920
- Running time: 60 minutes
- Country: United States
- Language: Silent...English titles

The Little Shepherd of Kingdom Come is a lost 1920 American silent drama film directed by Wallace Worsley and starring Jack Pickford. It was produced and distributed by Goldwyn Pictures.

== Cast ==
- Jack Pickford - Chad
- Clara Horton - Margaret
- Pauline Starke - Melissa
- J. Parks Jones - Dan Dean
- Clark Marshall - Harry Dean
- Edythe Chapman - Mrs. Dean
- James Neill - Major Buford
- R. D. MacLean - General (*as R.D. McLean)
- T. D. Crittenden - Schoolmaster (as Dwight Crittenden)
- Aileen Manning - Cousin Lucy
- Dudley Hendricks - Joel Turner
- Aggie Herring - Mrs. Turner
- Tod Burns - Turner Boy
- Lee Phelps - Turner Boy
- Milton Brown - Pop Dillon
