= Darbyville =

Darbyville may refer to:

- Darbyville, Iowa, an unincorporated community in Appanoose County
- Darbyville, Ohio, a village in Pickway County
- Darbyville, Virginia, a community in Lee County
