= 1961 Virginia gubernatorial election =

- November 7, 1961
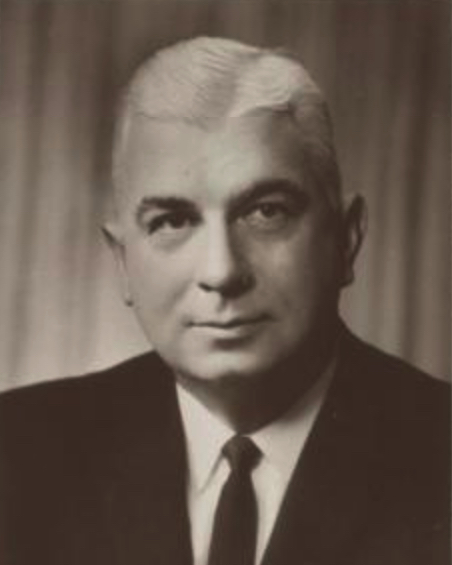

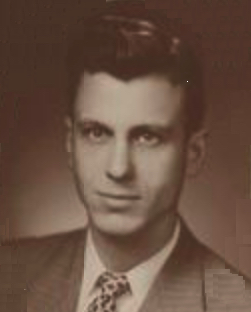
Nominee	Albertis Harrison	H. Clyde Pearson
Party	Democratic	Republican
Popular vote	251,861	142,567
Percentage	63.85%	36.15%
- County and independent city results Harrison: 50–60% 60–70% 70–80% 80–90% >90% Pearson: 50–60% 60–70%
Governor before election
J. Lindsay Almond
Democratic
Elected Governor
Albertis Harrison
Democratic

The 1961 Virginia gubernatorial election was held on November 7, 1961, to elect the governor of Virginia. Democratic former attorney general Albertis Harrison defeated Republican former state delegate H. Clyde Pearson.

Incumbent Democratic governor J. Lindsay Almond was ineligible to seek re-election to a second term due to the state's prohibition on consecutive gubernatorial terms.

== Background ==
1961 would become the last Virginia gubernatorial election under the control of the conservative Byrd Organization before the Twenty-fourth Amendment and Voting Rights Act served to greatly expand the state's electorate – previously exceedingly small due to a cumulative poll tax and literacy tests.

Allie Edward Stakes Stephens had served as Lieutenant Governor for over two terms since a 1952 special election. However, when the state went for losing GOP nominee Richard Nixon in 1960 despite Stephens supporting national Democrat Kennedy, it was clear that the long-serving lieutenant had broken with the Organization. With patriarch Byrd senior considering it inappropriate for his son to run for any state office, Attorney General Albertis S. Harrison Jr. gained the Organization support in January.

=== Campaign ===
By May Stephens had become strongly opposed to its longstanding policies and was campaigning vigorously against Organization nominee Harrison, aided by financial support from former councillor and current State Highway Commission member Walter Chinn. Harrison would consistently criticize Stephens for "intemperate" criticism of the Byrd Organization.

Although "Massive Resistance" had been ended by outgoing Governor Almond in 1959, education remained the major issue for all campaigns from the first primaries in June. Stephens would lose the July 11 primary by thirteen percentage points – significantly smaller than previous antiorganization candidates.

Campaigning was described by the press as "mild", and predictions – ultimately fulfilled – expected turnout to be less than forty percent of the state's approximately one million registered voters.

== Democratic primary ==
=== Candidates ===
==== Nominee ====
- Albertis Harrison, former attorney general of Virginia (1958–1961)

==== Eliminated in primary ====
- Allie Edward Stakes Stephens, lieutenant governor of Virginia (1952–1962)

==== Primary results by county and independent city ====
1961 Virginia gubernatorial Democratic primary by county or independent city
	Albertis Sydney Harrison jr. Democratic		Allie Edward Stakes Stephens Democratic		Margin		Total votes cast
	#	%	#	%	#	%	Total votes cast
Accomack County	2,968	66.83%	1,473	33.17%	1,495	33.66%	4,441
Albemarle County	1,529	65.71%	798	34.29%	731	31.41%	2,327
Alleghany County	436	61.67%	271	38.33%	165	23.34%	707
Amelia County	841	78.16%	235	21.84%	606	56.32%	1,076
Amherst County	1,611	69.65%	702	30.35%	909	39.30%	2,313
Appomattox County	1,608	88.06%	218	11.94%	1,390	76.12%	1,826
Arlington County	4,641	34.01%	9,004	65.99%	-4,363	-31.98%	13,645
Augusta County	1,283	74.85%	431	25.15%	852	49.71%	1,714
Bath County	225	74.01%	79	25.99%	146	48.03%	304
Bedford County	2,520	61.92%	1,550	38.08%	970	23.83%	4,070
Bland County	314	52.51%	284	47.49%	30	5.02%	598
Botetourt County	430	43.79%	552	56.21%	-122	-12.42%	982
Brunswick County	2,537	86.59%	393	13.41%	2,144	73.17%	2,930
Buchanan County	340	21.04%	1,276	78.96%	-936	-57.92%	1,616
Buckingham County	1,085	80.79%	258	19.21%	827	61.58%	1,343
Campbell County	1,518	71.54%	604	28.46%	914	43.07%	2,122
Caroline County	688	70.78%	284	29.22%	404	41.56%	972
Carroll County	217	21.81%	778	78.19%	-561	-56.38%	995
Charles City County	137	34.00%	266	66.00%	-129	-32.01%	403
Charlotte County	1,344	84.26%	251	15.74%	1,093	68.53%	1,595
Chesterfield County	4,751	74.11%	1,660	25.89%	3,091	48.21%	6,411
Clarke County	850	65.69%	444	34.31%	406	31.38%	1,294
Craig County	111	39.36%	171	60.64%	-60	-21.28%	282
Culpeper County	1,417	70.15%	603	29.85%	814	40.30%	2,020
Cumberland County	562	74.63%	191	25.37%	371	49.27%	753
Dickenson County	69	5.13%	1,277	94.87%	-1,208	-89.75%	1,346
Dinwiddie County	1,390	78.27%	386	21.73%	1,004	56.53%	1,776
Essex County	454	71.16%	184	28.84%	270	42.32%	638
Fairfax County	4,932	30.15%	11,427	69.85%	-6,495	-39.70%	16,359
Fauquier County	1,827	62.78%	1,083	37.22%	744	25.57%	2,910
Floyd County	56	15.34%	309	84.66%	-253	-69.32%	365
Fluvanna County	378	74.26%	131	25.74%	247	48.53%	509
Franklin County	1,224	48.78%	1,285	51.22%	-61	-2.43%	2,509
Frederick County	1,378	69.35%	609	30.65%	769	38.70%	1,987
Giles County	579	47.30%	645	52.70%	-66	-5.39%	1,224
Gloucester County	756	63.53%	434	36.47%	322	27.06%	1,190
Goochland County	841	78.60%	229	21.40%	612	57.20%	1,070
Grayson County	307	24.98%	922	75.02%	-615	-50.04%	1,229
Greene County	87	49.15%	90	50.85%	-3	-1.69%	177
Greensville County	1,843	80.45%	448	19.55%	1,395	60.89%	2,291
Halifax County	2,091	84.97%	370	15.03%	1,721	69.93%	2,461
Hanover County	2,784	76.78%	842	23.22%	1,942	53.56%	3,626
Henrico County	10,861	76.60%	3,318	23.40%	7,543	53.20%	14,179
Henry County	1,114	57.07%	838	42.93%	276	14.14%	1,952
Highland County	157	75.48%	51	24.52%	106	50.96%	208
Isle of Wight County	859	32.61%	1,775	67.39%	-916	-34.78%	2,634
James City County	355	48.56%	376	51.44%	-21	-2.87%	731
King and Queen County	269	65.77%	140	34.23%	129	31.54%	409
King George County	314	66.24%	160	33.76%	154	32.49%	474
King William County	706	72.56%	267	27.44%	439	45.12%	973
Lancaster County	820	60.25%	541	39.75%	279	20.50%	1,361
Lee County	234	15.48%	1,278	84.52%	-1,044	-69.05%	1,512
Loudoun County	1,434	65.39%	759	34.61%	675	30.78%	2,193
Louisa County	1,089	81.76%	243	18.24%	846	63.51%	1,332
Lunenburg County	1,635	86.65%	252	13.35%	1,383	73.29%	1,887
Madison County	396	79.68%	101	20.32%	295	59.36%	497
Mathews County	525	73.53%	189	26.47%	336	47.06%	714
Mecklenburg County	2,926	89.62%	339	10.38%	2,587	79.23%	3,265
Middlesex County	524	65.83%	272	34.17%	252	31.66%	796
Montgomery County	539	31.71%	1,161	68.29%	-622	-36.59%	1,700
Nansemond County	2,112	50.47%	2,073	49.53%	39	0.93%	4,185
Nelson County	946	66.62%	474	33.38%	472	33.24%	1,420
New Kent County	272	67.66%	130	32.34%	142	35.32%	402
Norfolk County	2,480	58.99%	1,724	41.01%	756	17.98%	4,204
Northampton County	1,309	82.85%	271	17.15%	1,038	65.70%	1,580
Northumberland County	666	63.49%	383	36.51%	283	26.98%	1,049
Nottoway County	1,703	77.55%	493	22.45%	1,210	55.10%	2,196
Orange County	752	70.61%	313	29.39%	439	41.22%	1,065
Page County	873	74.62%	297	25.38%	576	49.23%	1,170
Patrick County	848	57.65%	623	42.35%	225	15.30%	1,471
Pittsylvania County	4,414	78.68%	1,196	21.32%	3,218	57.36%	5,610
Powhatan County	450	67.98%	212	32.02%	238	35.95%	662
Prince Edward County	2,129	79.23%	558	20.77%	1,571	58.47%	2,687
Prince George County	756	76.60%	231	23.40%	525	53.19%	987
Prince William County	1,294	61.01%	827	38.99%	467	22.02%	2,121
Princess Anne County	4,019	73.66%	1,437	26.34%	2,582	47.32%	5,456
Pulaski County	866	49.66%	878	50.34%	-12	-0.69%	1,744
Rappahannock County	435	76.05%	137	23.95%	298	52.10%	572
Richmond County	492	71.72%	194	28.28%	298	43.44%	686
Roanoke County	1,529	53.99%	1,303	46.01%	226	7.98%	2,832
Rockbridge County	1,189	67.29%	578	32.71%	611	34.58%	1,767
Rockingham County	776	64.56%	426	35.44%	350	29.12%	1,202
Russell County	406	24.22%	1,270	75.78%	-864	-51.55%	1,676
Scott County	450	30.57%	1,022	69.43%	-572	-38.86%	1,472
Shenandoah County	1,070	75.51%	347	24.49%	723	51.02%	1,417
Smyth County	498	34.09%	963	65.91%	-465	-31.83%	1,461
Southampton County	1,834	67.45%	885	32.55%	949	34.90%	2,719
Spotsylvania County	508	42.37%	691	57.63%	-183	-15.26%	1,199
Stafford County	426	34.72%	801	65.28%	-375	-30.56%	1,227
Surry County	620	56.57%	476	43.43%	144	13.14%	1,096
Sussex County	1,429	84.66%	259	15.34%	1,170	69.31%	1,688
Tazewell County	677	28.88%	1,667	71.12%	-990	-42.24%	2,344
Warren County	1,383	68.98%	622	31.02%	761	37.96%	2,005
Washington County	648	31.72%	1,395	68.28%	-747	-36.56%	2,043
Westmoreland County	777	56.67%	594	43.33%	183	13.35%	1,371
Wise County	349	12.96%	2,343	87.04%	-1,994	-74.07%	2,692
Wythe County	607	49.15%	628	50.85%	-21	-1.70%	1,235
York County	1,078	53.13%	951	46.87%	127	6.26%	2,029
Alexandria City	3,400	37.45%	5,678	62.55%	-2,278	-25.09%	9,078
Bristol City	729	53.72%	628	46.28%	101	7.44%	1,357
Buena Vista City	447	74.87%	150	25.13%	297	49.75%	597
Charlottesville City	2,088	53.14%	1,841	46.86%	247	6.29%	3,929
Clifton Forge City	343	56.05%	269	43.95%	74	12.09%	612
Colonial Heights City	1,334	83.58%	262	16.42%	1,072	67.17%	1,596
Covington City	613	55.73%	487	44.27%	126	11.45%	1,100
Danville City	4,611	73.48%	1,664	26.52%	2,947	46.96%	6,275
Fairfax City	373	40.68%	544	59.32%	-171	-18.65%	917
Falls Church City	371	37.47%	619	62.53%	-248	-25.05%	990
Fredericksburg City	833	48.86%	872	51.14%	-39	-2.29%	1,705
Galax City	182	40.09%	272	59.91%	-90	-19.82%	454
Hampton City	3,365	43.49%	4,373	56.51%	-1,008	-13.03%	7,738
Harrisonburg City	576	70.67%	239	29.33%	337	41.35%	815
Hopewell City	1,778	69.81%	769	30.19%	1,009	39.62%	2,547
Lynchburg City	4,311	62.71%	2,563	37.29%	1,748	25.43%	6,874
Martinsville City	896	61.08%	571	38.92%	325	22.15%	1,467
Newport News City	4,536	49.09%	4,705	50.91%	-169	-1.83%	9,241
Norfolk City	11,556	46.90%	13,085	53.10%	-1,529	-6.21%	24,641
Norton City	123	32.89%	251	67.11%	-128	-34.22%	374
Petersburg City	2,433	63.93%	1,373	36.07%	1,060	27.85%	3,806
Portsmouth City	4,542	42.27%	6,203	57.73%	-1,661	-15.46%	10,745
Radford City	186	24.80%	564	75.20%	-378	-50.40%	750
Richmond City	16,082	57.67%	11,804	42.33%	4,278	15.34%	27,886
Roanoke City	3,556	45.54%	4,253	54.46%	-697	-8.93%	7,809
South Boston City	567	79.41%	147	20.59%	420	58.82%	714
South Norfolk City	931	63.90%	526	36.10%	405	27.80%	1,457
Staunton City	1,205	73.88%	426	26.12%	779	47.76%	1,631
Suffolk City	1,358	60.28%	895	39.72%	463	20.55%	2,253
Virginia Beach City	794	73.52%	286	26.48%	508	47.04%	1,080
Waynesboro City	772	71.35%	310	28.65%	462	42.70%	1,082
Williamsburg City	302	50.67%	294	49.33%	8	1.34%	596
Winchester City	1,540	74.15%	537	25.85%	1,003	48.29%	2,077
Totals	199,519	56.66%	152,639	43.34%	46,880	13.31%	352,158

== General election results ==
1961 Virginia gubernatorial election
Party	Candidate	Votes	%	±%
Democratic	Albertis S. Harrison, Jr.	251,861	63.85%	+0.69%
Republican	H. Clyde Pearson	142,567	36.15%	−0.29%
Majority		109,294	27.71%	+0.99%
Turnout		394,428		
Democratic hold		Swing		

=== Results by county or independent city ===
1961 Virginia gubernatorial election by county or independent city
	Albertis Sydney Harrison jr. Democratic		Henry Clyde Pearson Republican		Various candidates Write-ins		Margin		Total votes cast
	#	%	#	%	#	%	#	%	Total votes cast
Accomack County	1,921	80.55%	464	19.45%			1,457	61.09%	2,385
Albemarle County	2,093	66.40%	1,059	33.60%			1,034	32.80%	3,152
Alleghany County	689	58.29%	490	41.46%	3	0.25%	199	16.84%	1,182
Amelia County	782	77.97%	220	21.93%	1	0.10%	562	56.03%	1,003
Amherst County	1,533	77.78%	437	22.17%	1	0.05%	1,096	55.61%	1,971
Appomattox County	1,438	87.20%	211	12.80%			1,227	74.41%	1,649
Arlington County	10,893	55.58%	8,705	44.41%	2	0.01%	2,188	11.16%	19,600
Augusta County	2,624	59.79%	1,763	40.17%	2	0.05%	861	19.62%	4,389
Bath County	352	62.86%	208	37.14%			144	25.71%	560
Bedford County	1,929	70.63%	802	29.37%			1,127	41.27%	2,731
Bland County	509	56.74%	388	43.26%			121	13.49%	897
Botetourt County	1,189	57.19%	890	42.81%			299	14.38%	2,079
Brunswick County	2,306	89.66%	266	10.34%			2,040	79.32%	2,572
Buchanan County	2,624	55.58%	2,097	44.42%			527	11.16%	4,721
Buckingham County	911	83.50%	180	16.50%			731	67.00%	1,091
Campbell County	1,770	71.89%	692	28.11%			1,078	43.79%	2,462
Caroline County	809	74.56%	276	25.44%			533	49.12%	1,085
Carroll County	1,022	33.37%	2,041	66.63%			-1,019	-33.27%	3,063
Charles City County	174	32.46%	362	67.54%			-188	-35.07%	536
Charlotte County	1,041	85.19%	181	14.81%			860	70.38%	1,222
Chesterfield County	4,856	69.81%	2,100	30.19%			2,756	39.62%	6,956
Clarke County	618	83.97%	118	16.03%			500	67.93%	736
Craig County	375	64.21%	209	35.79%			166	28.42%	584
Culpeper County	1,482	84.83%	265	15.17%			1,217	69.66%	1,747
Cumberland County	503	76.91%	150	22.94%	1	0.15%	353	53.98%	654
Dickenson County	1,877	55.01%	1,535	44.99%			342	10.02%	3,412
Dinwiddie County	1,276	88.55%	165	11.45%			1,111	77.10%	1,441
Essex County	524	81.88%	116	18.13%			408	63.75%	640
Fairfax County	9,606	47.47%	10,624	52.50%	7	0.03%	-1,018	-5.03%	20,237
Fauquier County	1,581	78.93%	422	21.07%			1,159	57.86%	2,003
Floyd County	469	34.54%	889	65.46%			-420	-30.93%	1,358
Fluvanna County	466	75.04%	155	24.96%			311	50.08%	621
Franklin County	1,414	68.34%	655	31.66%			759	36.68%	2,069
Frederick County	1,123	76.50%	343	23.37%	2	0.14%	780	53.13%	1,468
Giles County	1,520	62.27%	921	37.73%			599	24.54%	2,441
Gloucester County	832	76.68%	253	23.32%			579	53.36%	1,085
Goochland County	772	78.62%	210	21.38%			562	57.23%	982
Grayson County	2,533	44.15%	3,204	55.85%			-671	-11.70%	5,737
Greene County	388	58.08%	280	41.92%			108	16.17%	668
Greensville County	1,340	83.91%	257	16.09%			1,083	67.81%	1,597
Halifax County	1,667	86.96%	250	13.04%			1,417	73.92%	1,917
Hanover County	1,854	76.39%	573	23.61%			1,281	52.78%	2,427
Henrico County	9,826	71.50%	3,915	28.49%	2	0.01%	5,911	43.01%	13,743
Henry County	1,247	60.80%	804	39.20%			443	21.60%	2,051
Highland County	361	54.29%	304	45.71%			57	8.57%	665
Isle of Wight County	1,247	70.97%	505	28.74%	5	0.28%	742	42.23%	1,757
James City County	397	56.31%	308	43.69%			89	12.62%	705
King and Queen County	317	73.72%	113	26.28%			204	47.44%	430
King George County	404	71.50%	161	28.50%			243	43.01%	565
King William County	774	76.63%	236	23.37%			538	53.27%	1,010
Lancaster County	759	69.25%	337	30.75%			422	38.50%	1,096
Lee County	2,794	58.22%	2,005	41.78%			789	16.44%	4,799
Loudoun County	1,504	76.89%	452	23.11%			1,052	53.78%	1,956
Louisa County	1,113	79.33%	290	20.67%			823	58.66%	1,403
Lunenburg County	1,287	86.43%	202	13.57%			1,085	72.87%	1,489
Madison County	519	66.54%	261	33.46%			258	33.08%	780
Mathews County	619	67.58%	297	32.42%			322	35.15%	916
Mecklenburg County	2,372	88.94%	295	11.06%			2,077	77.88%	2,667
Middlesex County	559	72.88%	208	27.12%			351	45.76%	767
Montgomery County	2,713	50.79%	2,628	49.20%	1	0.02%	85	1.59%	5,342
Nansemond County	2,342	76.69%	707	23.15%	5	0.16%	1,635	53.54%	3,054
Nelson County	818	83.90%	157	16.10%			661	67.79%	975
New Kent County	339	71.07%	138	28.93%			201	42.14%	477
Norfolk County	2,712	77.42%	791	22.58%			1,921	54.84%	3,503
Northampton County	1,051	85.31%	181	14.69%			870	70.62%	1,232
Northumberland County	677	71.04%	276	28.96%			401	42.08%	953
Nottoway County	1,498	83.83%	289	16.17%			1,209	67.66%	1,787
Orange County	858	73.90%	299	25.75%	4	0.34%	559	48.15%	1,161
Page County	1,937	55.41%	1,559	44.59%			378	10.81%	3,496
Patrick County	1,220	78.31%	338	21.69%			882	56.61%	1,558
Pittsylvania County	3,103	83.26%	624	16.74%			2,479	66.51%	3,727
Powhatan County	537	67.80%	255	32.20%			282	35.61%	792
Prince Edward County	1,804	78.78%	486	21.22%			1,318	57.55%	2,290
Prince George County	624	78.00%	176	22.00%			448	56.00%	800
Prince William County	2,033	71.21%	822	28.79%			1,211	42.42%	2,855
Princess Anne County	3,845	77.77%	1,099	22.23%			2,746	55.54%	4,944
Pulaski County	1,607	57.91%	1,168	42.09%			439	15.82%	2,775
Rappahannock County	358	80.63%	86	19.37%			272	61.26%	444
Richmond County	385	74.90%	129	25.10%			256	49.81%	514
Roanoke County	3,467	48.86%	3,629	51.14%			-162	-2.28%	7,096
Rockbridge County	1,282	65.64%	671	34.36%			611	31.29%	1,953
Rockingham County	1,910	49.28%	1,966	50.72%			-56	-1.44%	3,876
Russell County	1,635	51.22%	1,557	48.78%			78	2.44%	3,192
Scott County	2,495	46.57%	2,863	53.43%			-368	-6.87%	5,358
Shenandoah County	1,776	46.35%	2,056	53.65%			-280	-7.31%	3,832
Smyth County	1,460	46.76%	1,662	53.24%			-202	-6.47%	3,122
Southampton County	1,820	86.30%	289	13.70%			1,531	72.59%	2,109
Spotsylvania County	587	62.51%	351	37.38%	1	0.11%	236	25.13%	939
Stafford County	650	61.90%	399	38.00%	1	0.10%	251	23.90%	1,050
Surry County	688	80.37%	168	19.63%			520	60.75%	856
Sussex County	1,266	91.81%	113	8.19%			1,153	83.61%	1,379
Tazewell County	2,289	60.44%	1,497	39.53%	1	0.03%	792	20.91%	3,787
Warren County	1,671	75.99%	528	24.01%			1,143	51.98%	2,199
Washington County	3,111	58.74%	2,183	41.22%	2	0.04%	928	17.52%	5,296
Westmoreland County	696	79.09%	184	20.91%			512	58.18%	880
Wise County	3,058	64.97%	1,648	35.01%	1	0.02%	1,410	29.96%	4,707
Wythe County	1,643	53.15%	1,448	46.85%			195	6.31%	3,091
York County	925	57.52%	683	42.48%			242	15.05%	1,608
Alexandria City	5,012	61.66%	3,116	38.34%			6	23.33%	8,128
Bristol City	1,495	73.25%	542	26.56%	4	0.20%	953	46.69%	2,041
Buena Vista City	620	73.20%	227	26.80%			393	46.40%	847
Charlottesville City	1,699	60.64%	1,103	39.36%			596	21.27%	2,802
Clifton Forge City	1,003	68.89%	453	31.11%			550	37.77%	1,456
Colonial Heights City	1,039	86.44%	163	13.56%			876	72.88%	1,202
Covington City	913	58.83%	638	41.11%	1	0.06%	275	17.72%	1,552
Danville City	3,776	77.33%	1,107	22.67%			2,669	54.66%	4,883
Fairfax City	642	55.39%	517	44.61%			125	10.79%	1,159
Falls Church City	916	53.26%	804	46.74%			112	6.51%	1,720
Fredericksburg City	902	70.30%	381	29.70%			521	40.61%	1,283
Galax City	596	51.07%	571	48.93%			25	2.14%	1,167
Hampton City	3,158	60.43%	2,064	39.49%	4	0.08%	1,094	20.93%	5,226
Harrisonburg City	992	60.82%	639	39.18%			353	21.64%	1,631
Hopewell City	1,783	75.61%	575	24.39%			1,208	51.23%	2,358
Lynchburg City	3,976	61.95%	2,442	38.05%			1,534	23.90%	6,418
Martinsville City	1,476	67.24%	719	32.76%			757	34.49%	2,195
Newport News City	4,023	62.71%	2,392	37.29%			1,631	25.42%	6,415
Norfolk City	12,394	65.10%	6,643	34.90%			5,751	30.21%	19,037
Norton City	440	61.28%	278	38.72%			162	22.56%	718
Petersburg City	2,072	77.66%	595	22.30%	1	0.04%	1,477	55.36%	2,668
Portsmouth City	5,756	71.40%	2,306	28.60%			3,450	42.79%	8,062
Radford City	1,416	54.46%	1,184	45.54%			232	8.92%	2,600
Richmond City	15,671	62.49%	9,401	37.49%	4	0.02%	6,270	25.00%	25,076
Roanoke City	7,472	49.20%	7,716	50.80%			-244	-1.61%	15,188
South Boston City	485	83.05%	99	16.95%			386	66.10%	584
South Norfolk City	1,914	79.52%	493	20.48%			1,421	59.04%	2,407
Staunton City	2,147	66.72%	1,071	33.28%			1,076	33.44%	3,218
Suffolk City	1,331	82.41%	284	17.59%			1,047	64.83%	1,615
Virginia Beach City	752	81.21%	174	18.79%			578	62.42%	926
Waynesboro City	1,679	60.40%	1,097	39.46%	4	0.14%	582	20.94%	2,780
Williamsburg City	321	60.00%	212	39.63%	2	0.37%	109	20.37%	535
Winchester City	1,316	79.52%	339	20.48%			977	59.03%	1,655
Total	251,861	63.84%	142,567	36.14%	62	0.02%	109,294	27.71%	394,490

Counties and independent cities that flipped from Republican to Democratic

- Arlington
- Bland
- Buchanan
- Pulaski
- Montgomery
- Wythe
- Falls Church (independent city)
- Galax (independent city)
- Radford (independent city)

Counties and independent cities that flipped from Democratic to Republican

- Roanoke
- Rockingham
- Shenandoah
- Roanoke (independent city)

== Analysis ==
Harrison almost exactly matched Almond's performance from 1957, improving the Democratic margin by one percentage point. Nevertheless, the ensuing collapse of the Byrd machine means this remains the last occasion a Democratic gubernatorial nominee has won sixty percent of the vote, and only Gerald Baliles in 1985 has subsequently won every congressional district in a gubernatorial election for either party. This would be the last occasion until 2017 that Chesterfield County voted Democratic for Governor, and remains the last occasion when Augusta County or Greene County voted for a Democratic gubernatorial candidate. The collapse of the Byrd machine, however, meant that this is the last election when Charles City County voted for a Republican gubernatorial candidate, as the black electorate, which had become a majority of voters in that county continued to oppose Byrd candidates, but would soon shift to Democrats as it had earlier done at other levels.
