= William C. Fugate =

American politician

Member of the Virginia House of Delegates from Lee County
- In office January 8, 1958 – January 13, 1960
- Preceded by: H. Clyde Pearson
- Succeeded by: Robert S. Orr

Personal details
- Born: William Charles Fugate; September 3, 1931 Gibson Station, Virginia
- Died: February 26, 2011 (aged 79) Jonesville, Virginia
- Party: Democratic
- Spouse: Jean Gibbings Burton
- Education: Lincoln Memorial University; University of Richmond

William Charles Fugate (September 3, 1931 – February 26, 2011) was an American lawyer and politician who served in the Virginia House of Delegates.
