= Dryden, Virginia =

- Census-designated place
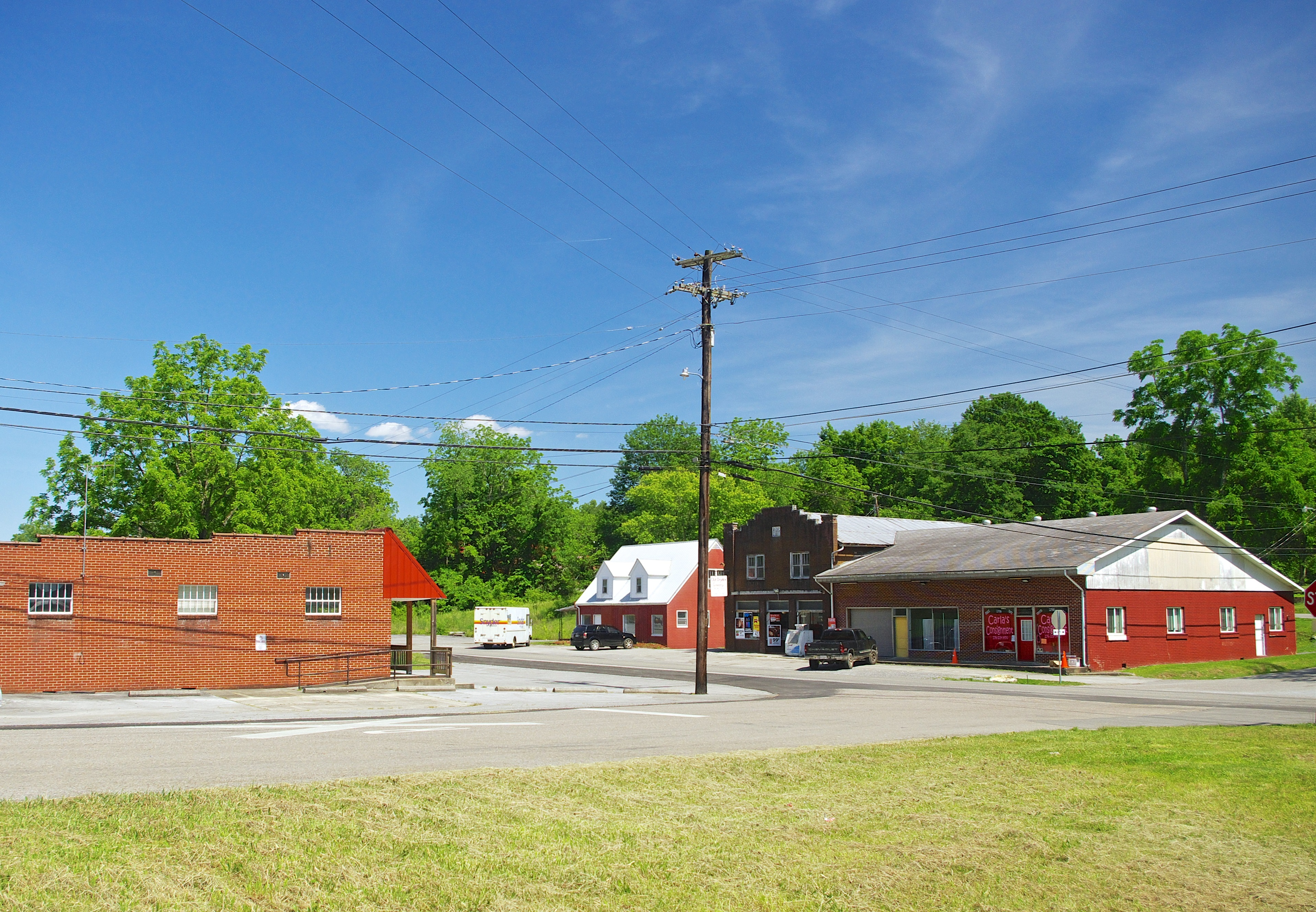
- Dryden
- Nickname: Yokum Station
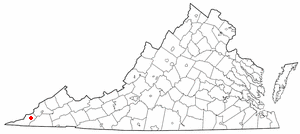
- Location of Dryden, Virginia
- Coordinates: 36°46′33″N 82°56′39″W
- Country: United States
- State: Virginia
- County: Lee

Area
  - Total: 7.17 sq mi (18.57 km^{2})
  - Land: 7.06 sq mi (18.29 km^{2})
  - Water: 0.11 sq mi (0.28 km^{2})
- Elevation: 1,440 ft (439 m)

Population (2010)
  - Total: 1,208
  - Density: 171/sq mi (66.1/km^{2})
- Time zone: UTC−5 (Eastern (EST))
  - Summer (DST): UTC−4 (EDT)
- ZIP code: 24243
- Area code: 276
- FIPS code: 51-23584
- GNIS feature ID: 1483150

Dryden is an unincorporated community and census-designated place (CDP) in Lee County, Virginia, United States. As of the 2020 census, Dryden had a population of 986.

== History ==
The Dryden post office was established in 1879. The community was named for Captain Dryden, a railroad official.

== Geography ==
Dryden is located in northeastern Lee County at 36°46′33″N 82°56′39″W (36.775836, −82.944157). The community is concentrated in an area just off U.S. Route 58 Alternate, northeast of Pennington Gap and southwest of Big Stone Gap. Dryden's southern border is the Powell River, and parts of the Jefferson National Forest lie to the north.

According to the U.S. Census Bureau, the Dryden CDP has a total area of 7.2 square miles (18.6 km^{2}), of which 7.1 square miles (18.3 km^{2}) are land and 0.1 square miles (0.3 km^{2}), or 1.51%, are water.

== Demographics ==
Historical population
Census	Pop.	Note	%±
2000	1,253		—
2020	986		—
U.S. Decennial Census; 2000 2010 2020

Dryden was first listed as a census designated place in the 2000 U.S. census.

As of the census of 2000, there were 1,253 people, 453 households, and 329 families residing in the CDP. The population density was 175.9 people per square mile (67.9/km^{2}). There were 507 housing units at an average density of 71.2/sq mi (27.5/km^{2}). The racial makeup of the CDP was 98.64% White, 0.72% African American, 0.32% Native American, 0.24% Asian, and 0.08% from two or more races. Hispanic or Latino of any race were 0.16% of the population.

There were 453 households, out of which 33.6% had children under the age of 18 living with them, 54.7% were married couples living together, 14.3% had a female householder with no husband present, and 27.2% were non-families. 24.9% of all households were made up of individuals, and 11.7% had someone living alone who was 65 years of age or older. The average household size was 2.49 and the average family size was 2.96.

In the CDP, the population was spread out, with 22.9% under the age of 18, 8.3% from 18 to 24, 27.4% from 25 to 44, 25.5% from 45 to 64, and 16.0% who were 65 years of age or older. The median age was 39 years. For every 100 females, there were 90.4 males. For every 100 females age 18 and over, there were 87.2 males.

The median income for a household in the CDP was $21,023, and the median income for a family was $25,806. Males had a median income of $26,250 versus $20,250 for females. The per capita income for the CDP was $12,825. About 17.8% of families and 22.3% of the population were below the poverty line, including 32.7% of those under age 18 and 10.8% of those age 65 or over.

== Notable residents ==
- Pete DeBusk, founder of DeRoyal Industries
- Jim Pankovits, Major League Baseball player
- C. Bascom Slemp, secretary to President Calvin Coolidge
