= Fleenortown, Virginia =

Unincorporated community in Virginia, United States

Coordinates: 36°42′19″N 83°07′50″W

Fleenortown is an unincorporated community in Lee County, Virginia, United States.

== History ==
Fleenortown was founded by Dr. Drury Fleenor, and named for him.
