= Turners Siding, Virginia =

Unincorporated community in Virginia, United States

Coordinates: 36°49′04″N 83°02′56″W

Turners Siding is an unincorporated community in Lee County, Virginia, United States.

== History ==
Turners Siding was named for Henry Turner, an early settler.
