= Penn Lee, Virginia =

Unincorporated community in Virginia, United States

Coordinates: 36°47′23″N 83°03′24″W

Penn Lee is an unincorporated community in Lee County, Virginia, United States.

== History ==
Penn Lee took its name from the Penn Lee Coal Co.
