= H. Clyde Pearson =

American lawyer & politician (1925–2010)

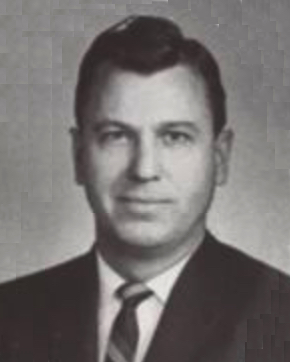
- Official portrait, 1970

Member of the Virginia Senate from the 18th district
- In office January 10, 1968 – March 14, 1970
- Preceded by: Hale Collins
- Succeeded by: David F. Thornton

Member of the Virginia House of Delegates from Lee County
- In office January 13, 1954 – July 30, 1956
- Preceded by: Walter B. Greene
- Succeeded by: William C. Fugate

Personal details
- Born: Henry Clyde Pearson; March 12, 1925 Ocoonita, Virginia, U.S.
- Died: March 26, 2010 (aged 85) Salem, Virginia, U.S.
- Party: Republican
- Spouse: Norma Jean Calton (m. 1956)
- Education: Union College; University of Richmond

Military service
- Allegiance: United States
- Branch/service: United States Navy
- Battles/wars: World War II

Henry Clyde Pearson (March 12, 1925 – March 26, 2010) was an American lawyer and politician from Virginia. He served in both the House of Delegates and the Senate. In 1961, he was the Republican nominee for Governor of Virginia.

== Early life ==
He served in the United States Navy during World War II. He attended Union College in Barboursville, Kentucky. He became after in Republican politics after graduating from the University of Richmond and establishing his law firm in Jonesville. He was a supporter of Eisenhower in 1952, and supported the candidacy of William C. Wampler.

== Political career ==
When he was elected to the Virginia House of Delegates, he was just one of five Republicans in the legislature at the time. In 1961, he was the Republican candidate for governor, where he lost to Albertis Harrison. The Republican ticket consisted of Pearson for governor, Hazel K. Barger for lieutenant governor, and Leon Owens for attorney general.

Party political offices
Preceded by Theodore Roosevelt Dalton	Republican nominee for Governor of Virginia; 1961	Succeeded by Linwood Holton
