= 1952 Virginia lieutenant gubernatorial special election =

- November 4, 1952
Nominee	Allie Edward Stakes Stephens	Robert W. Waitt Jr.
Party	Democratic	Republican
Popular vote	329,959	171,526
Percentage	64.66%	33.61%
- County and independent city results Stephens: 50–60% 60–70% 70–80% 80–90% >90%
Lieutenant Governor before election
Lewis Preston Collins II
Democratic
Elected Lieutenant Governor
Allie Edward Stakes Stephens
Democratic

The 1952 Virginia lieutenant gubernatorial special election was held on November 4, 1952, in order to elect the lieutenant governor of Virginia following the death of incumbent lieutenant governor Lewis Preston Collins II. Democratic nominee and incumbent member of the Virginia Senate Allie Edward Stakes Stephens defeated Republican nominee Robert W. Waitt Jr..

== General election ==
On election day, November 4, 1952, Democratic nominee Allie Edward Stakes Stephens won the election by a margin of 158,433 votes against his opponent Republican nominee Robert W. Waitt Jr., thereby retaining Democratic control over the office of lieutenant governor. Stephens was sworn in as the 27th lieutenant governor of Virginia on December 2, 1952.

=== Results ===
Virginia lieutenant gubernatorial special election, 1952
Party	Candidate	Votes	%
Democratic	Allie Edward Stakes Stephens	329,959	64.66
Republican	Robert W. Waitt Jr.	171,526	33.61
Write-in		8,848	1.73
Total votes		510,333	100.00
Democratic hold			
