= Benedict-Leona Mines, Virginia =

Unincorporated community in Virginia, United States

Coordinates: 36.838423°N 83.024055°W

Benedict-Leona Mines was a census-designated place (then termed an unincorporated place) in Lee County, Virginia, United States. Its first and only designation was at the 1950 United States census when it had a population of 1,486. Benedict-Leona Mines did not reappear at subsequent censuses.
