= Boons Path, Virginia =

Unincorporated community in Virginia, United States

- Unincorporated community
- Location within Virginia Location within the United States
- Coordinates: 36°40′45″N 83°21′8″W
- Country: United States
- State: Virginia
- County: Lee
- Elevation: 1,411 ft (430 m)
- Time zone: UTC-5 (Eastern (EST))
  - Summer (DST): UTC-4 (EDT)
- GNIS feature ID: 1500356

Boons Path is an unincorporated community in Lee County, Virginia, United States.

Boons Path contained a post office from 1873 until 1919.
