= Gary Tillery =

American writer and artist (born 1947)

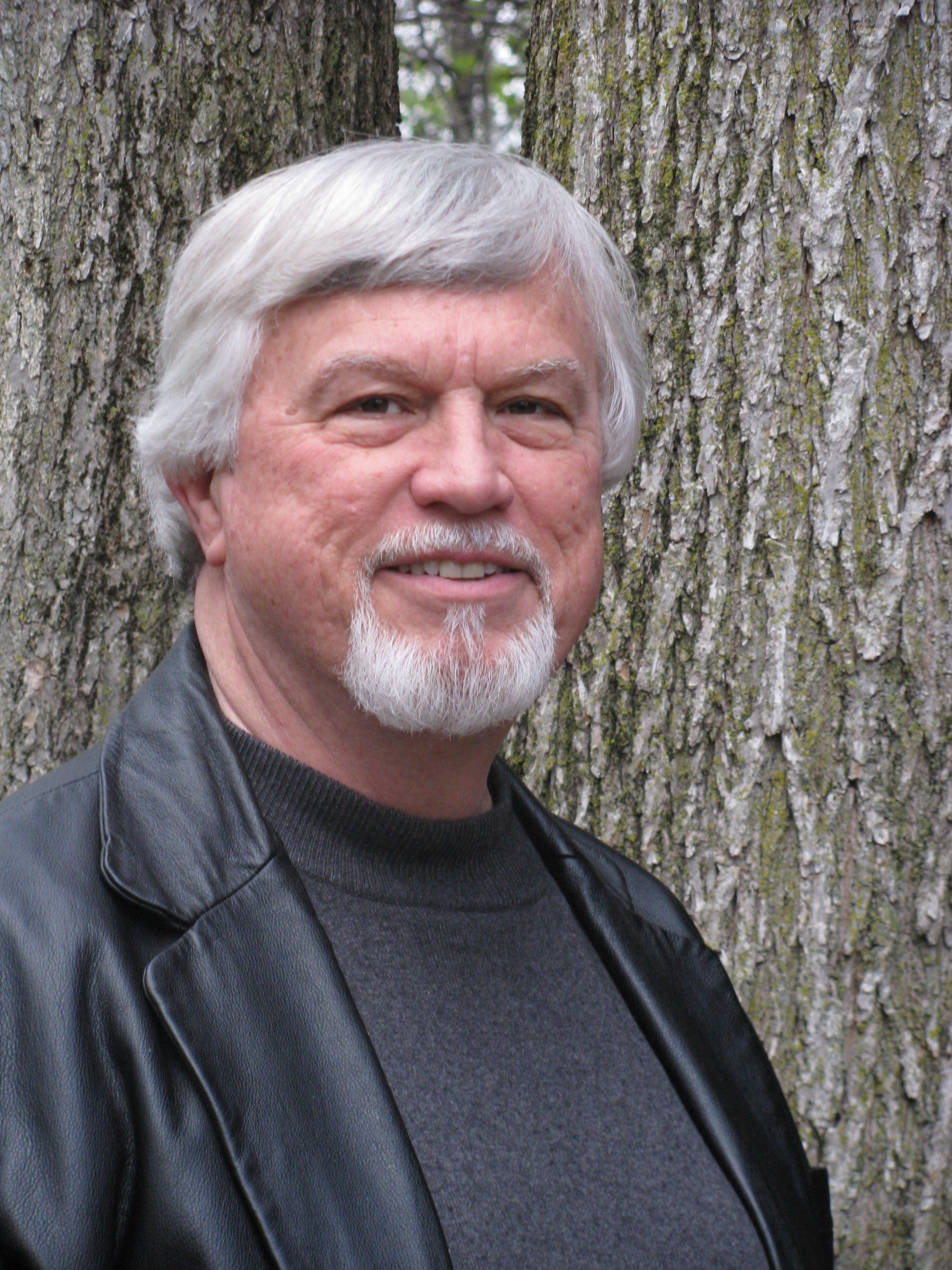
- Born: August 6, 1947; Phoenix, Arizona
- Known for: Writer, Sculptor

Gary Tillery is an American writer and artist known for his biographies focusing on the spiritual lives of famous figures, and for his public sculptures. His 2009 book, The Cynical Idealist, was named the official book of the 2010 Theatre Within John Lennon Tribute in New York City, and he created the centerpiece sculpture of the Chicago Vietnam Veterans Memorial, dedicated in 2005.

== Early life ==
Gary Glenn Tillery was born in Phoenix, Arizona on August 6, 1947, the son of a farmer who had brought the family west from Oklahoma after they survived a tornado.

The intensifying Vietnam War interrupted his higher education. He joined the United States Air Force and was deployed to Tan Son Nhut Air Base, near Saigon. His arrival happened to coincide with the "Mini-Tet" Offensive of May 1968, the month that proved to be the deadliest of the entire war for U.S. forces. During his first few weeks, the base came under repeated attack by 122mm rockets and mortar fire. His experiences in the war would serve as background for his book Darkling Plain, an experimental novel constructed of interlinked short stories.

After his military service, Tillery returned to Phoenix and attended Arizona State University. He received a bachelor's degree in Latin American Studies in 1972, and went on to Thunderbird School of Global Management, where in 1973 he earned a master's degree in International Management.

After moving to the Chicago area, he co-founded The Townsend Agency, Ltd. in 1979, and worked as an advertising executive for 17 years.

Throughout his time in the business world he felt drawn to create literature and art. One of his short stories, "Dragon with a Broken Wing," was selected by Ray Bradbury to receive first prize in a contest honoring the famous native of Waukegan, Illinois. In 1996, Tillery resigned his position as chairman of The Townsend Agency to pursue his twin interests of writing and sculpture.

== Writer ==
As a writer, his best-known work is The Cynical Idealist: A Spiritual Biography of John Lennon. The book, which grew out of his 2005 article for Philosophy Now magazine, was the first to examine John Lennon as a man of ideas, exploring his impact on the world as a consequence of his spiritual growth and his self-generated humanist philosophy. Reviewer Grady Harp observed: "Without resorting to puffery or hero worship, Tillery places Lennon's accomplishments with the arts as well as with the framework of political upheaval of his day to reveal a man who will be remembered not only for his prodigious talent, but also for his influence on philosophical thinking." The Cynical Idealist was selected as the official book of the 2010 John Lennon Tribute in New York City, and subsequently translated into German, French, Portuguese, and Danish.

Based on its success, Quest Books published Tillery's Working Class Mystic: A Spiritual Biography of George Harrison in 2011, and The Seeker King: A Spiritual Biography of Elvis Presley in 2013. The latter was selected as a featured book by the Patheos Book Club. His other writings include Darkling Plain, inspired by his recollections of the Vietnam War, The Roots of the Wind, a novel drawn from his experiences on a scientific expedition to the Western Rift Valley in Africa, three comedic detective novels, three volumes of poetry, and Yeshua, My Beloved, a fact-based novel about Jesus derived from the research of Bible scholars.

== Artist ==
In 2000, Tillery's sculpture They Also Serve was accepted by the National Vietnam Veterans Art Museum for its permanent collection. As a result of his connection with the museum, he was selected to create the centerpiece sculpture in the Chicago Vietnam Veterans Memorial at Wabash Plaza, dedicated in 2005. In 2004 he created the bust of Steve Allen for the Steve Allen Theater in Hollywood.

Affiliated with the Fine Art Studio of Rotblatt Amrany from its founding in 1992, Tillery joined the studio team to create several prominent outdoor sculptures, including Luis Aparicio at U.S. Cellular Field, T. Denny Sanford at the Sanford USD Medical Center in Sioux Falls, South Dakota, and Ray Kroc and Ronald McDonald in downtown Chicago. He was co-sculptor, with Omri Amrany, on the statue of Pat Tillman for the Arizona Cardinals football team, and lead sculptor on the 2-ton, 9-foot statue of Jerry Colangelo for Grand Canyon University in Phoenix, Arizona, erected only a few blocks from Tillery's childhood home.

On Veterans Day 2018 his 14-foot work, Defenders of Peace, was dedicated at the College of Lake County in Illinois. In July 2019 his bronze sculpture of Johnny Appleseed was unveiled in downtown Fort Wayne, Indiana. John Chapman (better known as Johnny Appleseed) was a resident of Fort Wayne in the final years of his life, and died there in March 1845.

Tillery's life-size bronze statue of Richard G. Hatcher was dedicated in October 2019 in Gary, Indiana. Hatcher was notable for being the first African-American to be elected mayor of a major U.S. city.

Tillery was lead sculptor on the bronze sculpture of Pete DeBusk, chairman of the Lincoln Memorial University Board of Trustees, which was unveiled in October 2021 in Harrogate, Tennessee.

The Tillery-designed memorial for the American Legion post in Lake Forest, Illinois--a 13-ton structure of granite and white bronze to honor Lake Forest residents who died serving during the nation's wars--was dedicated in September 2023. Tillery wrote a poem to the fallen which was read at the event.

== Notable works ==
(Writer)

- Darkling Plain (2000)
- Death, Be Not Loud (2000)
- To an Aesthete Dying Young (2000)
- The Cynical Idealist: A Spiritual Biography of John Lennon (2009)
- Working Class Mystic: A Spiritual Biography of George Harrison (2011)
- 50 Epiphanies (2012)
- Through a Dark, Glassly (2012)
- She Stalks in Beauty (2013)
- The Seeker King: A Spiritual Biography of Elvis Presley (2013)
- The Ghosts of Wrigley Field (2014)
- The Roots of the Wind (2017)
- Yeshua, My Beloved (2017)

(Artist)

- They Also Serve (2000)
- Steve Allen (2004)
- Chicago Vietnam Veterans Memorial (2005)
- Ray Kroc (2005)
- Ronald McDonald (2005)
- Luis Aparicio (2006)
- Pat Tillman (2006)
- T. Denny Sanford (2008)
- Defenders of Peace (2018)
- Jerry Colangelo (2019)
- Johnny Appleseed (2019)
- Pete DeBusk (2021)
- Lake Forest American Legion Memorial (2023)
