= Central Baptist Association =

The Central Baptist Association is an association of churches located from South Carolina to Indiana, with most of the churches being in eastern Tennessee and southwestern Virginia. In 1956, some churches of the Eastern District Primitive Baptist Association separated and formed the Central Baptist Association. The churches entering this new organization desired to be more progressive and to provide a home for homeless and destitute children. They adopted the name Central Baptist "as an indication of our acceptance of the Holy Scriptures in their entirety, varying neither to the right or left" (Minutes, 1996, p.4). In 1996 there were almost 4000 members in 34 churches located in five states. Currently they have headquarters in Jasper, Virginia, including a tabernacle, a children's home and a youth Bible camp.

"The work of the Association includes the building of a fellowship of churches to provide, first for a general union of churches; second, to preserve inviolable a chain of communion among the churches; third, to give the churches all necessary advice and help in matters of church difficulty, so far as this is possible by peaceful methods: assisting churches in a Sunday School program for all ages, weekly prayer meetings, worship services, a monthly business meeting, an active youth program, Bible teaching, evangelistic and missionary work, visitation program, aiding established churches in organizing new churches and related projects; also support a home for adults and a children's home, youth camp, and Bible camp for all ages." (Minutes, 1996, p.4)

== Sources ==
- Central Baptist Association minutes
- Baptists Around the World, by Albert W. Wardin, Jr.
- Handbook of Denominations, by Frank S. Mead and Samuel Hill
