= Hubbard Springs, Virginia =

Unincorporated community in Virginia, United States

Coordinates: 36°43′22″N 83°13′14″W

Hubbard Springs is an unincorporated community in Lee County, Virginia, United States.

== History ==
A post office was established at Hubbard Springs in 1892, and remained in operation until it was discontinued in 1955. The community was named for Eli Hubbard, an early landowner.
