= Olinger, Virginia =

Unincorporated community in Virginia, United States

Coordinates: 36°49′02″N 82°51′53″W

Olinger is an unincorporated community in Lee County, Virginia, United States.

== History ==
A post office was established at Olinger in 1891, and remained in operation until it was discontinued in 1957. The community was named for the locally prominent Olinger family.
