= Van, Virginia =

Unincorporated community in Virginia, United States

Coordinates: 36°36′49″N 83°09′20″W

Van is an unincorporated community in Lee County, Virginia, United States.

A post office was established at Van in 1884 and remained in operation until being discontinued in 1906. The community was named for Rev. John B. Van, an early postmaster.
