= Vietnam Veterans Memorial (Chicago) =

War memorial in Chicago, Illinois, U.S.

- U.S.
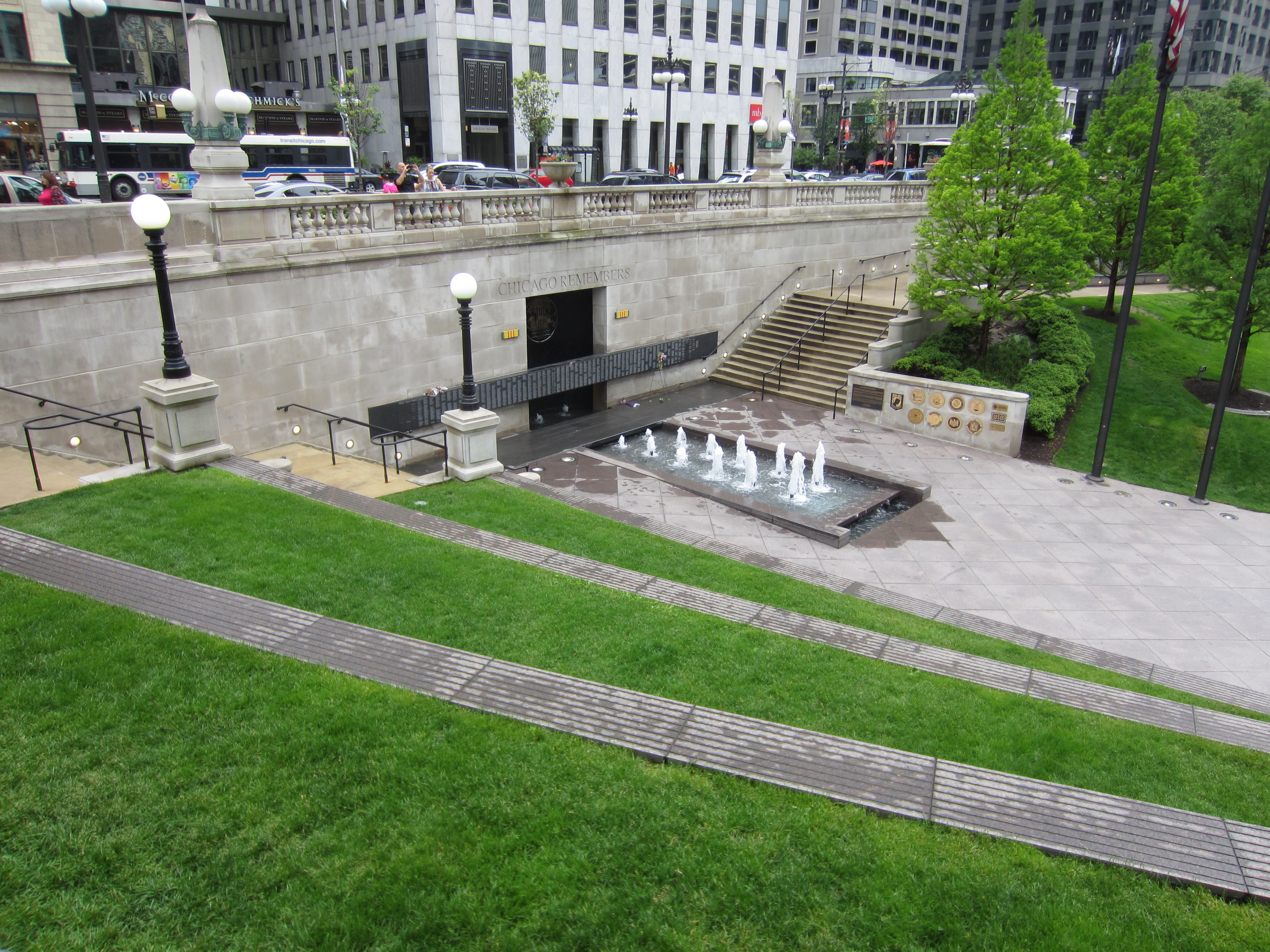
- The memorial in 2015
- Used for those deceased
- Location: 41.88706°N 87.62714°W; Chicago, Illinois, United States
- Designed by: Gary Tillery

Burials by war
- Vietnam War

Vietnam Veterans Memorial (Chicago)

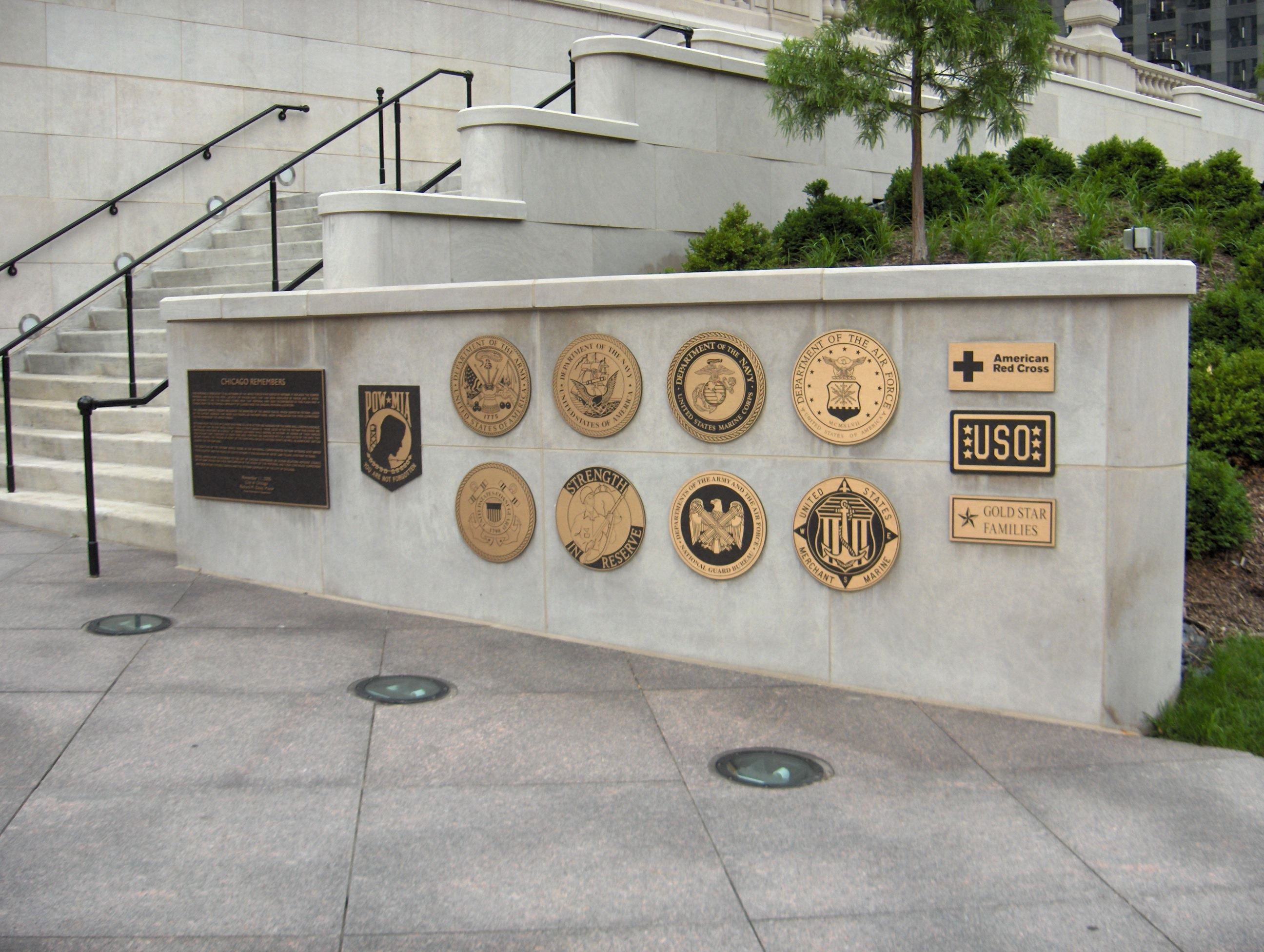
Western view of the memorial, 2007

The Vietnam Veterans Memorial is a war memorial in Chicago, in the U.S. state of Illinois, dedicated on November 11, 2005.

== Description and history ==
features a rectangular fountain basin and stone wall inscribed with the names of those who died during the Vietnam War. According to the Smithsonian Institution, which surveyed the monument as part of its "Save Outdoor Sculpture!" program: "This memorial is dedicated to veterans from all branches of the armed services who served in Vietnam. It replaces the former Vietnam Memorial located on Wacker Drive that was dedicated on November 11, 1982. The inscribed stones from that memorial have been incorporated into the plaza of this memorial."

The featured sculpture was created by Gary Tillery, himself a Vietnam veteran.

== See also ==
- New Jersey Vietnam Veterans Memorial, Holmdel Township, New Jersey
- Vietnam Veterans Memorial, Washington, D.C.
- Vietnam Veterans Plaza, New York City
