= Allie Edward Stakes Stephens =

American politician (1900–1973)

27th Lieutenant Governor of Virginia
- In office December 2, 1952 – January 13, 1962
- Governor: John S. Battle; Thomas B. Stanley; J. Lindsay Almond
- Preceded by: Lewis Preston Collins II
- Succeeded by: Mills Godwin

Member of the Virginia Senate from the 5th district
- In office January 14, 1942 – December 2, 1952
- Preceded by: Edward E. Holland
- Succeeded by: Mills Godwin

Member of the Virginia House of Delegates from Isle of Wight County
- In office January 8, 1930 – January 14, 1942
- Preceded by: D. W. Chapman
- Succeeded by: Ernest H. Williams Jr.

Personal details
- Born: Allie Edward Stakes Stephens; November 4, 1900 Northumberland County, Virginia, U.S.
- Died: June 9, 1973 (aged 72) Newport News, Virginia, U.S.
- Party: Democratic
- Spouse: Anna Spratley Delk
- Children: 3
- Education: College of William & Mary
- Profession: Attorney

Allie Edward Stakes Stephens, usually known as "A. E. S." or "Gi" Stephens (November 4, 1900 – June 9, 1973), was a Virginia lawyer and Democratic Party politician who served in both houses of the Virginia General Assembly and as the 27th lieutenant governor of Virginia from 1952 to 1962. His state political career ended with a loss in the Democratic primary for Governor in 1961, after he and Governor J. Lindsay Almond broke with the Byrd Organization, which wanted to continue its policy of massive resistance to desegregation of Virginia's schools after both the Virginia Supreme Court and a 3-judge federal panel ruled most elements unconstitutional in 1959.

== Early and family life ==
Born on November 4, 1900, in Wicomico Church, Virginia, Gi was the fourth son of J.W.G. Stephens (a former cowboy turned general merchandise store owner) and Allie Tyson Beane Stephens. He attended local public schools in Northumberland County through high school. Beginning in 1919, Stephens attended the College of William and Mary where he was a star baseball pitcher. There he gained the nickname "Gi" meaning "giraffe" for his lanky physique. He continued on to graduate with both an undergraduate and a law degree in 1923, declining an offer to play for the Washington Senators farm system. He married Anna Spratley Delk (1903–2001) of Smithfield in 1928, and they had three children (and many grandchildren) who survived their parents.

== Career ==
Upon admission to the Virginia bar, Stephens began a private legal practice in Isle of Wight County, Virginia. He declined to run against the local commonwealth's attorney in 1927, having witnessed that man successfully transport an accused African-American prisoner to the Petersburg jail rather than accede to a local lynch mob. Stephens did, however, become active in politics, and later the Byrd Organization. He was elected Isle of Wight County's delegate to the Virginia House of Delegates in 1929 and served for 12 years in that part-time position. In 1940, Stephens successfully ran for Senate District 5, then encompassing Nansemond County, Suffolk City, Southampton County, and Isle of Wight County. His main legislative accomplishments included establishing the Hampton Roads Sanitation Commission, the Denny Commission (which improved public education) and assisting the local seafood industry.

=== Lieutenant governor ===
After the unexpected death of lieutenant governor Lewis Preston Collins II, Stephens ran in the three-candidate Democratic primary and won in the special election as well. He took office on December 2, 1952, and won reelection in 1953 and 1957. During the Massive Resistance crisis, after both the Virginia Supreme Court and a 3-judge federal panel held most elements of the Stanley Plan unconstitutional, Stephens and Governor J. Lindsay Almond realized further active resistance was futile, and hurt Virginia businesses as well as citizens. In April 1959, Stephens presided over the State Senate during a parliamentary maneuver that helped State Senators Mosby Perrow Jr., Armistead Boothe and Stuart B. Carter (among others) narrowly secure passage of bills which allowed localities to determine whether to desegregate their schools. Stephens resigned in December 1960 to run for governor following Almond's early declaration example. However, the Byrd Organization slated Albertis Harrison (the attorney general who had supported segregation and litigation against the NAACP) as their candidate.

=== 1961 election ===
Stephens lost in the 1961 Democratic primary (199,519 to 152,639), and Byrd loyalists Mills Godwin defeated moderate Armistead Boothe for lieutenant Governor and Robert Young Button defeated professor T. Munford Boyd for attorney general. However, the machine's vote totals were lower than earlier decades. Harrison defeated Republican H. Clyde Pearson in November, as the Byrd slate won one of its last victories as Virginia's demographics changed.\

== Later life ==
Stephens never again ran for statewide office, though he served as the town attorney for Smithfield until December 1971, and remained active in the town's Christ Episcopal Church. He retained political influence in Virginia, even as the Byrd organization declined. Stephens helped restore and preserve the commonwealth's oldest Episcopal church, St. Luke's Church, and was a member of Old Dominion University's Board of Visitors until 1972.

=== Death and legacy ===
Stephens died after a short illness at Riverside Hospital in Newport News, Virginia. He and Anna are buried in the cemetery of the historic St. Luke's Church at Smithfield that they helped preserve. Old Dominion University has his papers from 1949–1961.

Political offices
Preceded by Lewis Preston Collins II	Lieutenant Governor of Virginia; 1952–1962	Succeeded by Mills Godwin
