= Calvin, Virginia =

Unincorporated community in Virginia, United States

Coordinates: 36°51′07″N 82°56′30″W

Calvin is an unincorporated community in Lee County, Virginia, United States.

== History ==
A post office was established at Calvin in 1924 and remained in operation until being discontinued in 1955. The community was named for Calvin Pardee, a mining official.
