= Stickleyville, Virginia =

Unincorporated community in Virginia, United States

- Census-designated place
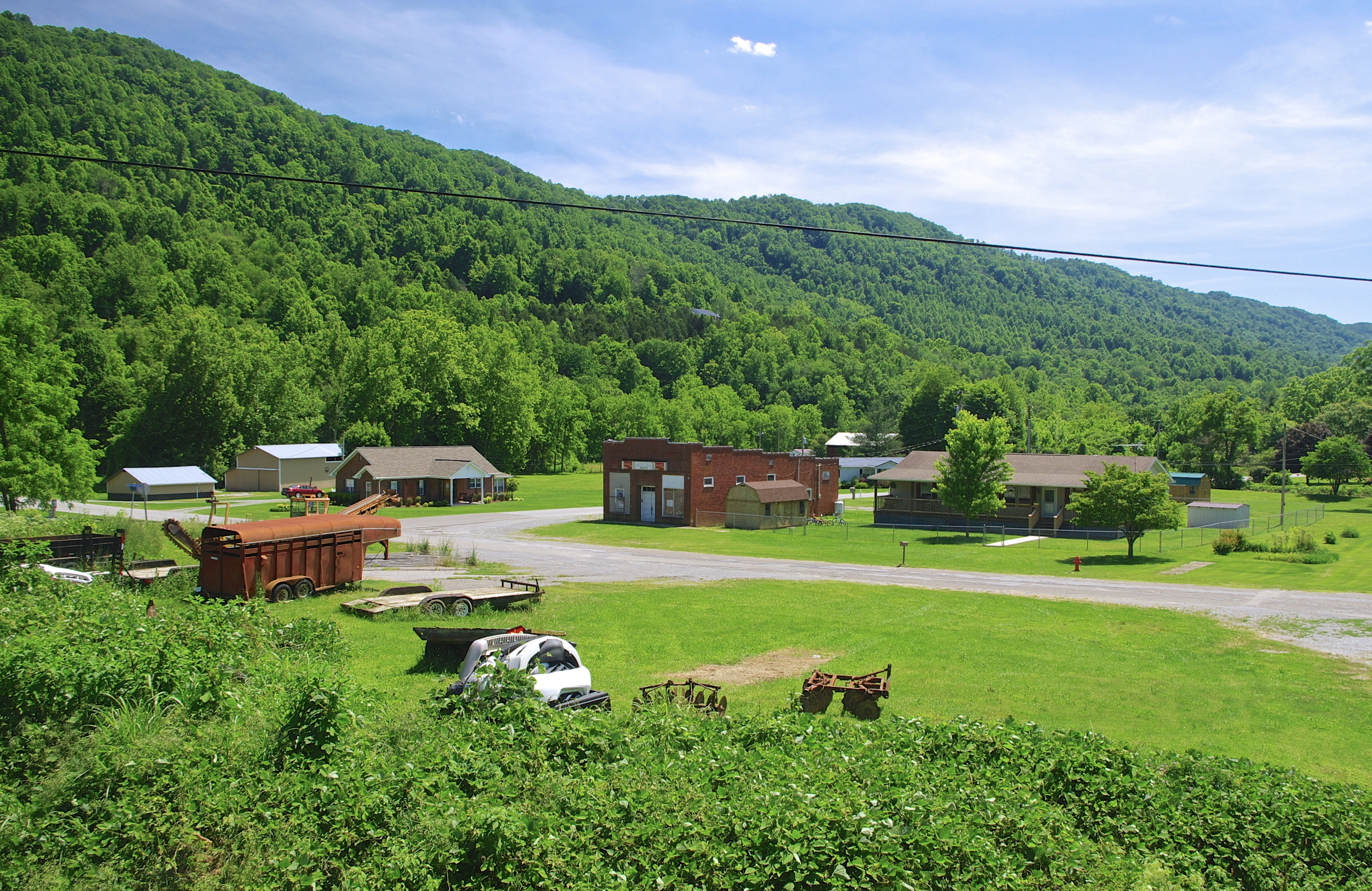
- Stickleyville

- Location within Virginia Location within the United States
- Coordinates: 36°42′25″N 82°54′26″W
- Country: United States
- State: Virginia
- County: Lee

Area
  - Total: 2.85 sq mi (7.38 km^{2})
  - Land: 2.85 sq mi (7.38 km^{2})
  - Water: 0 sq mi (0.0 km^{2})
- Elevation: 1,631 ft (497 m)
- Time zone: UTC−5 (Eastern (EST))
  - Summer (DST): UTC−4 (EDT)
- GNIS feature ID: 1475137

Stickleyville is an unincorporated community and census-designated place (CDP) in Lee County, Virginia, United States. It has also been known as Stickleysville. The community was first listed as a CDP for the 2020 census. As of the 2020 census, Stickleyville had a population of 279.

The community is concentrated along U.S. Route 421 near the Lee County/Scott County line in the Wallen Creek Valley. Duffield lies across Powell Mountain to the east, and Pennington Gap lies across Wallen Ridge to the northwest.

A post office was established as Stickleysville in 1850. The community was named for Vastine Stickley, a pioneer settler.

== Demographics ==
Stickleyville first appeared as a census designated place in the 2020 U.S. census.
