= Pocket, Virginia =

Unincorporated community in Virginia, United States

- Unincorporated community
- Location within Virginia Location within the United States
- Coordinates: 36°46′53″N 83°2′34″W
- Country: United States
- State: Virginia
- County: Lee
- Elevation: 1,447 ft (441 m)
- Time zone: UTC-5 (Eastern (EST))
  - Summer (DST): UTC-4 (EDT)
- GNIS feature ID: 1497099

Pocket is an unincorporated community in Lee County, Virginia, United States.

== Etymology ==
Pocket was intended as a descriptive name for the town site situated in a small river valley.
