= Monarch, Virginia =

Unincorporated community in Virginia, United States

- Unincorporated community
- Location within Virginia Location within the United States
- Coordinates: 36°50′7″N 83°1′52″W
- Country: United States
- State: Virginia
- County: Lee
- Elevation: 1,749 ft (533 m)
- Time zone: UTC-5 (Eastern (EST))
  - Summer (DST): UTC-4 (EDT)
- GNIS feature ID: 1497021

Monarch is an unincorporated community in Lee County, Virginia, United States.
