= Wheeler, Virginia =

Unincorporated community in Virginia, United States

- Unincorporated community
- Location within Virginia Location within the United States
- Coordinates: 36°37′19″N 83°33′19″W
- Country: United States
- State: Virginia
- County: Lee
- Elevation: 1,280 ft (390 m)
- Time zone: UTC−5 (Eastern (EST))
  - Summer (DST): UTC−4 (EDT)
- Area code: 276
- GNIS feature ID: 1500308

Wheeler is an unincorporated community in Lee County, Virginia, United States. Wheeler is located along U.S. Route 58, 6.5 miles (10.5 km) east-northeast of Cumberland Gap, Tennessee. It is the southwesternmost populated place in Virginia. Wheeler is closer to nine different state capitols (Frankfort, Nashville, Charleston, Atlanta, Columbia, Columbus, Raleigh, Indianapolis, and Montgomery) than it is to the Virginia State Capitol in Richmond, 340 miles away. It is also closer to both Memphis and Savannah than it is to either Alexandria or Norfolk.

== History ==
The community was likely named for the Wheeler family of pioneer settlers.
