= DeRoyal =

American healthcare company

DeRoyal Industries
- Company type: Privately held
- Industry: Health Care
- Founded: 1973
- Founder: Pete DeBusk
- Headquarters: Powell, Tennessee, United States
- Area served: International
- Key people: Chief Executive Officer Brian DeBusk; Chief Sales Officer Chris Schulze
- Products: Medical Equipment
- Owner: Pete DeBusk
- Number of employees: 1,900
- Website: www.deroyal.com

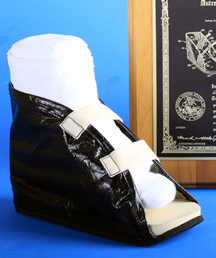
DeRoyal's first product, a cast boot.

DeRoyal Industries is a vertically integrated manufacturer and marketer of health care products. It is a privately held company with headquarters in Powell, Tennessee and manufacturing facilities in the U.S. states of Tennessee, Florida, Georgia, South Carolina, and Virginia, as well as in Costa Rica, Dominican Republic, Estonia, and Guatemala. As of 2017, DeRoyal reported having approximately 1900 employees.

DeRoyal manufactures, markets, and sells health care products worldwide, with more than 20,000 products in product lines that include orthopedic softgoods, orthopedic bracing, wound dressings, surgical safety and critical care products, anesthesia and temperature monitoring supplies, birthing and neonatal care items, angiography and endoscopy products, and custom surgical procedure trays. The company also offers original equipment manufacturer services, including electronics, plastics, textiles, converting, sterilization, metals fabrication, packaging and assembly, and distribution. As of 2010, DeRoyal reported that it held more than 70 U.S. patents.

== History ==
The company traces its origin to 1973, when founder Autry O. V. "Pete" DeBusk started producing a protective boot he had invented to protect orthopedic casts from dirt and damage.

The company quickly expanded during the 1970s to include divisions in patient care, surgical, and patient protection products.

DeRoyal continued to expand its domestic manufacturing operations throughout the 1980s via construction and acquisition. During this period, the company pioneered systems for producing custom surgical procedure trays on a just-in-time basis.

In the 1990s, DeRoyal opened a Wound Care division, and continued to introduce new products and systems, such as the TraceCart case-cart-to-waste-cart delivery program. The company also opened new manufacturing facilities in the U.S., South America, and Europe.

The 2000s saw additional expansion and product diversification for DeRoyal, with new facilities in Estonia, Dominican Republic, and Guatemala, new product offerings in fluid medical waste management and custom bracing, and a presence on the World Wide Web.

In November 2019, DeRoyal received honors in the Radio Frequency Identification category at the 2019 Case Study Competition by AIM.
