= Ocoonita, Virginia =

Unincorporated community in Virginia, United States

- Unincorporated community
- Location within Virginia Location within the United States
- Coordinates: 36°44′00″N 83°8′15″W
- Country: United States
- State: Virginia
- County: Lee
- Elevation: 1,676 ft (511 m)
- Time zone: UTC-5 (Eastern (EST))
  - Summer (DST): UTC-4 (EDT)
- GNIS feature ID: 1496041

Ocoonita is an unincorporated community in Lee County, Virginia, United States.

== History ==
A post office was established at Ocoonita in 1893, and remained in operation until it was discontinued in 1960. Legend has it Ocoonita was the name of a Native American princess.
