= Lewis Preston Collins II =

American politician

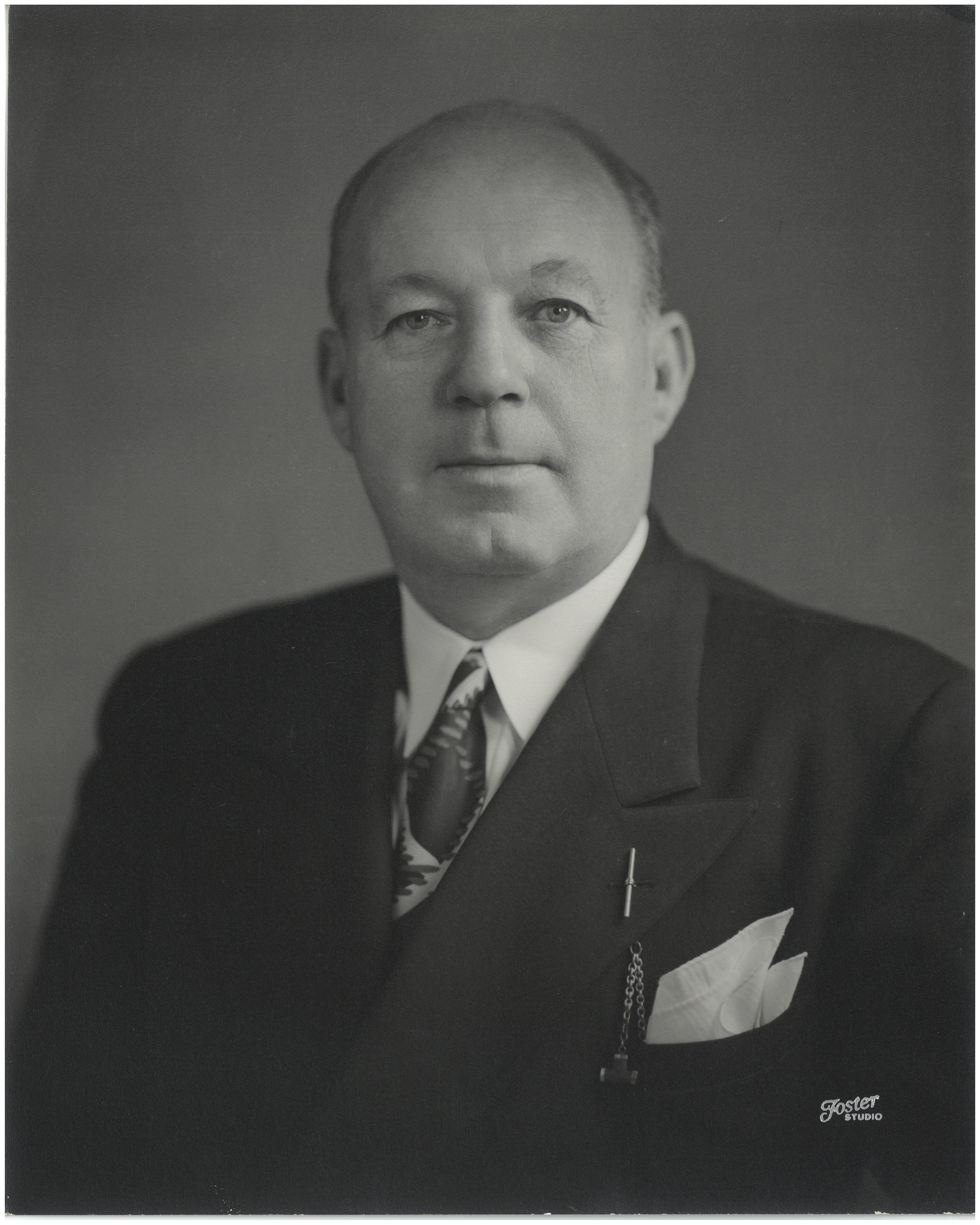

26th Lieutenant Governor of Virginia
- In office January 16, 1946 – September 20, 1952
- Governor: William M. Tuck; John S. Battle
- Preceded by: William M. Tuck
- Succeeded by: Allie Edward Stakes Stephens

Member of the Virginia House of Delegates from Smyth County
- In office January 8, 1936 – January 9, 1946
- Preceded by: J. Tyler Frazier, Jr.
- Succeeded by: Ralph L. Lincoln

Personal details
- Born: Lewis Preston Collins II; December 25, 1896 Lynchburg, Virginia, U.S.
- Died: September 20, 1952 (aged 55) Wythe County, Virginia, U.S.
- Party: Democratic
- Spouse: Pauline Hull Staley
- Education: Washington & Lee University
- Profession: lawyer, department store owner

Lewis Preston "Pat" Collins II (December 25, 1896 – September 20, 1952) served as the 26th Lieutenant Governor of Virginia from 1946 until his sudden death in office in 1952. He was usually known as L. Preston Collins or Pat Collins.

== Early life ==
The son of Lewis Preston Collins and Ella Bolling Moorman, Collins was born in Lynchburg, Virginia, and educated in the public schools of Marion. He began studies at Washington and Lee University, but interrupted them to serve in World War I. After discharge, he attended Yale University to study law, and graduated with a LL.B. degree in 1922, the same year he received his undergraduate degree from Washington and Lee University.

Admitted to the Virginia bar in 1922, Collins practiced law in Marion (the county seat of Smyth County), and also owned and operated a department store there. He also represented clients in nearby Washington County and Wythe Counties.

== Politics ==
Known as a Byrd Organization Democrat, Collins was first elected to the Virginia House of Delegates (a part-time position) in 1936, and was re-elected several times.

In 1945 Collins ran for the Democratic Party nomination for lieutenant governor. He appeared to lose to another Byrd Democrat, Charles R. Fenwick of Arlington (Senator Harry F. Byrd not having endorsed either, and Leonard Muse of Roanoke running on an anti-Byrd platform). Despite the Byrd Organization's "clean government" image, the vote totals for Fenwick in Wise County (winning 3,307 to 122) and for Collins in Appomattox County (winning 1610 to 25) seemed improbable. Collins challenged the Wise County results (particularly since mailed ballots far exceeded the number of eligible voters and many poll books had disappeared), and a Richmond judge threw them out. Fenwick did not pursue an inquiry into the Appomattox returns, but accepted defeat.

Collins easily won the general election in November 1945 and was re-elected in 1949.

== Death and legacy ==
During his second term as lieutenant governor, Collins suffered a heart attack while being introduced to dedicate an elementary school near Austinville in Wythe County, and died. He was buried in Marion, survived by his wife Pauline (1900-1962) and their son, Lewis Preston Collins III. The University of Virginia received his papers, and maintains them in a special collection in the law library.

Political offices
Preceded by William M. Tuck	Lieutenant Governor of Virginia; 1946–1952	Succeeded by Allie Edward Stakes Stephens
