= Darbyville, Iowa =

- Unincorporated community
- Location within Iowa
- Coordinates: 40°48′58″N 92°52′24″W
- Country: United States
- State: Iowa
- County: Appanoose
- Elevation: 883 ft (269 m)
- Time zone: UTC-6 (Central (CST))
  - Summer (DST): UTC-5 (CDT)
- Area code: 641
- GNIS feature ID: 455793

Darbyville is an unincorporated community in Appanoose County, Iowa, United States.

== History ==
Darbyville was centered on a coal mine that closed in 1901, after it accidentally flooded. A post office was established in Darbyville in 1891, and remained in operation until it was discontinued in 1910. The population was 44 in 1940.
