= Gibson Station, Virginia =

Unincorporated community in Virginia, United States

- Unincorporated community
- Location within Virginia Location within the United States
- Coordinates: 36°36′15″N 83°35′51″W
- Country: United States
- State: Virginia
- County: Lee
- Elevation: 1,194 ft (364 m)
- Time zone: UTC-5 (Eastern (EST))
  - Summer (DST): UTC-4 (EDT)
- Area code: 276
- GNIS feature ID: 1499470

Gibson Station is an unincorporated community in Lee County, Virginia, United States. Gibson Station is located along U.S. Route 58, 4 miles (6.4 km) east of Cumberland Gap.

== History ==
Gibson Station contained a post office from 1872 until 1966. The community was named for Maj. George Gibson, an early resident.
