= Jasper, Virginia =

Unincorporated community in Virginia, United States

- Unincorporated community
- Location within Virginia Location within the United States
- Coordinates: 36°46′5″N 82°49′23″W
- Country: United States
- State: Virginia
- County: Lee
- Elevation: 1,572 ft (479 m)
- Time zone: UTC-5 (Eastern (EST))
  - Summer (DST): UTC-4 (EDT)
- GNIS feature ID: 1493135

Jasper is an unincorporated community in Lee County, Virginia, United States.

== History ==
A post office was established at Jasper in 1897, and remained in operation until it was discontinued in 1918. The community was likely named for Jasper Edens, a railman.
