= Pete DeBusk =

American businessman

Autry O.V. Pete DeBusk is the owner and chairman of DeRoyal Industries located in Knoxville, Tennessee.

DeBusk was born and raised in Rose Hill, Virginia, where he graduated from Thomas Walker High School. After graduating from Lincoln Memorial University, DeBusk began his career in 1965 as a pharmaceutical salesman and regional sales manager. In 1973 DeBusk patented his first medical product, an orthopedic boot, and founded DeRoyal Industries.

DeBusk self-published a book in 2013, "The Rabbit's Got the Gun: The DeRoyal Industries Story," which recounts his business career.

As the chairman of the Lincoln Memorial University Board of Trustees and a member of MedPAC Commission, DeBusk co-founded the Lincoln Memorial University DeBusk College of Osteopathic Medicine in 2007. The Lincoln Memorial University- John J. Duncan, Jr. School of Law, also co-founded by DeBusk, was subsequently denied provisional accreditation by the American Bar Association. However, in the Fall of 2015, the law school received provisional accreditation from the American Bar Association.
