= Lee County, Virginia =

County in Virginia, United States

- County
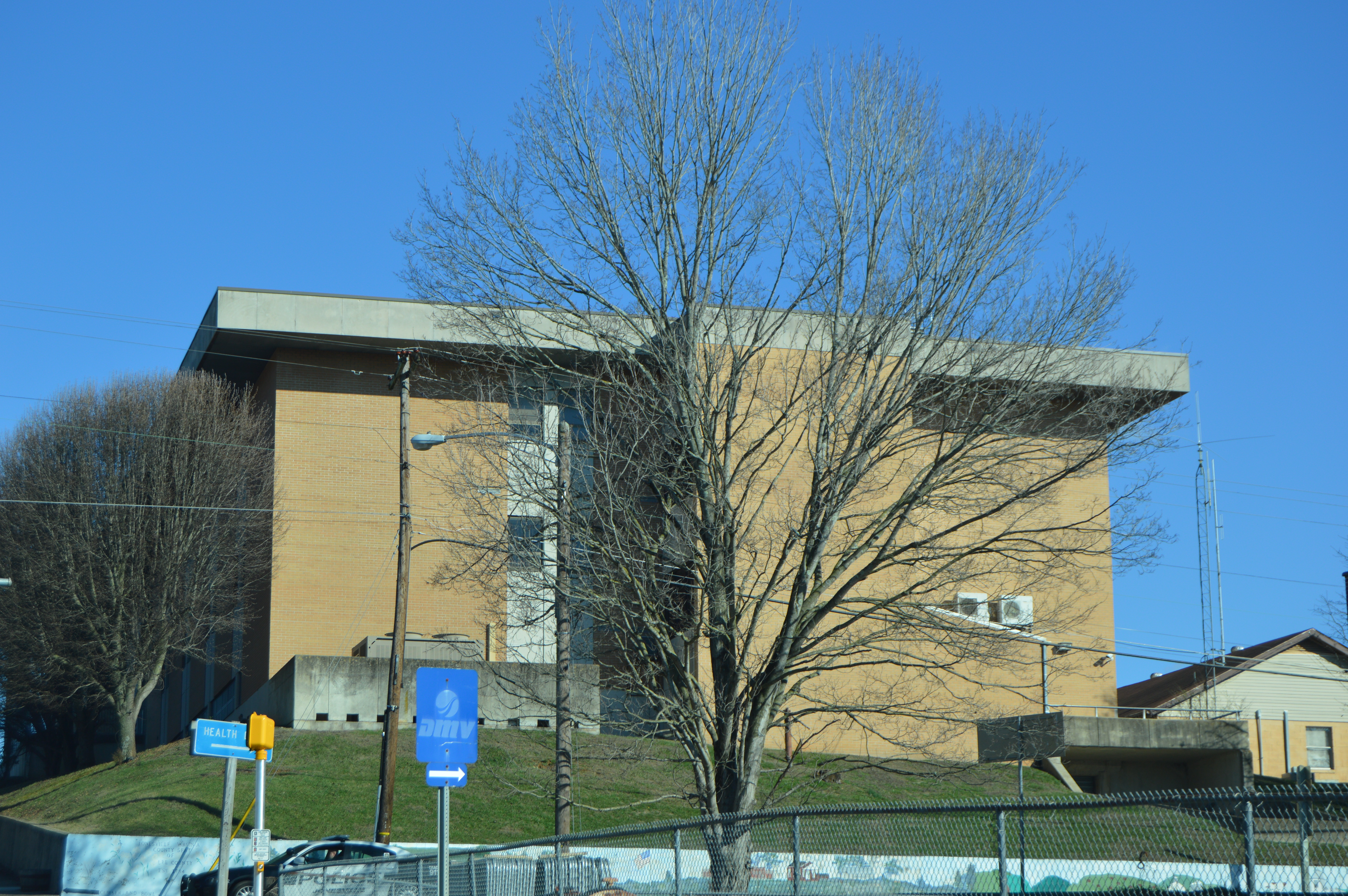
- Lee County Courthouse in Jonesville

- Location within the U.S. state of Virginia
- Coordinates: 36°43′N 83°08′W
- Country: United States
- State: Virginia
- Founded: October 25, 1792
- Named for: Henry Lee III
- Seat: Jonesville
- Largest town: Pennington Gap

Area
  - Total: 437 sq mi (1,130 km^{2})
  - Land: 436 sq mi (1,130 km^{2})
  - Water: 1.9 sq mi (4.9 km^{2}) 0.4%

Population (2020)
  - Total: 22,173
  - Estimate (2025): 21,642 ▼
  - Density: 50.9/sq mi (19.6/km^{2})
- Time zone: UTC−5 (Eastern)
  - Summer (DST): UTC−4 (EDT)
- Congressional district: 9th
- Website: www.leecova.com

Lee County is the westernmost county in the U.S. Commonwealth of Virginia. As of the 2020 census, the population was 22,173. The median age in the county is 45.4. Its county seat is Jonesville.

Lee County's westernmost tip is closer to nine other state capitals than it is to Richmond.

== History ==
The area of far western Virginia and eastern Kentucky supported large Archaic Native American populations. The first known Europeans to enter what is present-day Lee County were a party of Spanish explorers, Juan de Villalobos and Francisco de Silvera, sent by Hernando de Soto in 1540, in search of gold. The county was formed after the American Revolutionary War in 1792 from Russell County. It was named for Light Horse Harry Lee, the governor of Virginia from 1791 to 1794, who was famous for his exploits as a leader of light cavalry during the war. He was the father of Robert E. Lee, later a West Point graduate and career U.S. Army officer who became the General in Chief of the Armies of the Confederate States during the American Civil War.

Lee County was the final front on the Kentucky Trace, now known as the Wilderness Road and The Trail of the Lonesome Pine. During the 1780s and 1790s, fortified buildings called "stations" were built along the trail for shelter from Indian raids as the settlers followed Daniel Boone's path into the Kentucky frontier. The stations in Lee County were Yoakum Station at present-day Dryden, west to Powell River and Station Creek at today's Rocky Station, then to Mump's Fort at Jonesville, followed by Prist Station, Martin's Station at Rose Hill, Chadwell Station at Chadwell Gap, Owen Station at Ewing, and finally Gibson Station, which still bears its original name. One of the largest early landowners was Revolutionary War officer and explorer Joseph Martin, after whom Martin's Station and Martin's Creek at Rose Hill are named. Due to his rank of command, Martin had been awarded some 25,000 acres (100 km^{2}) in a land grant after the war. He divided the land and sold it as a speculator. Rose Hill was established in 1832 as the first federally recognized post office in Lee County. In 1814, parts of Lee, Russell, and Washington counties were combined to form Scott County. In 1856, parts of Lee, Russell, and Scott counties were combined to form Wise County, named after the last governor of Virginia before the Civil War.

== Economy ==
The economy of Lee County has been based largely on growing tobacco and mining coal. The decline of both has resulted in high unemployment in the county and a decrease in population since 1940, which was the peak. Using the slogan Where Virginia Begins, the county has attempted to increase its heritage tourism industry by emphasizing its role in the route used by settlers going west through the Cumberland Gap, at Lee County's western tip. Lee County shares Cumberland Gap National Historical Park with Kentucky and Tennessee. Attractions listed in the park include Hensley's Settlement, the Pinnacle Overlook, the Sand Cave, and the White Rocks overlooking the towns of Ewing and Rose Hill in Virginia. Lee County is a dry county for hard liquor, although retail sales are permitted.

== Geography ==
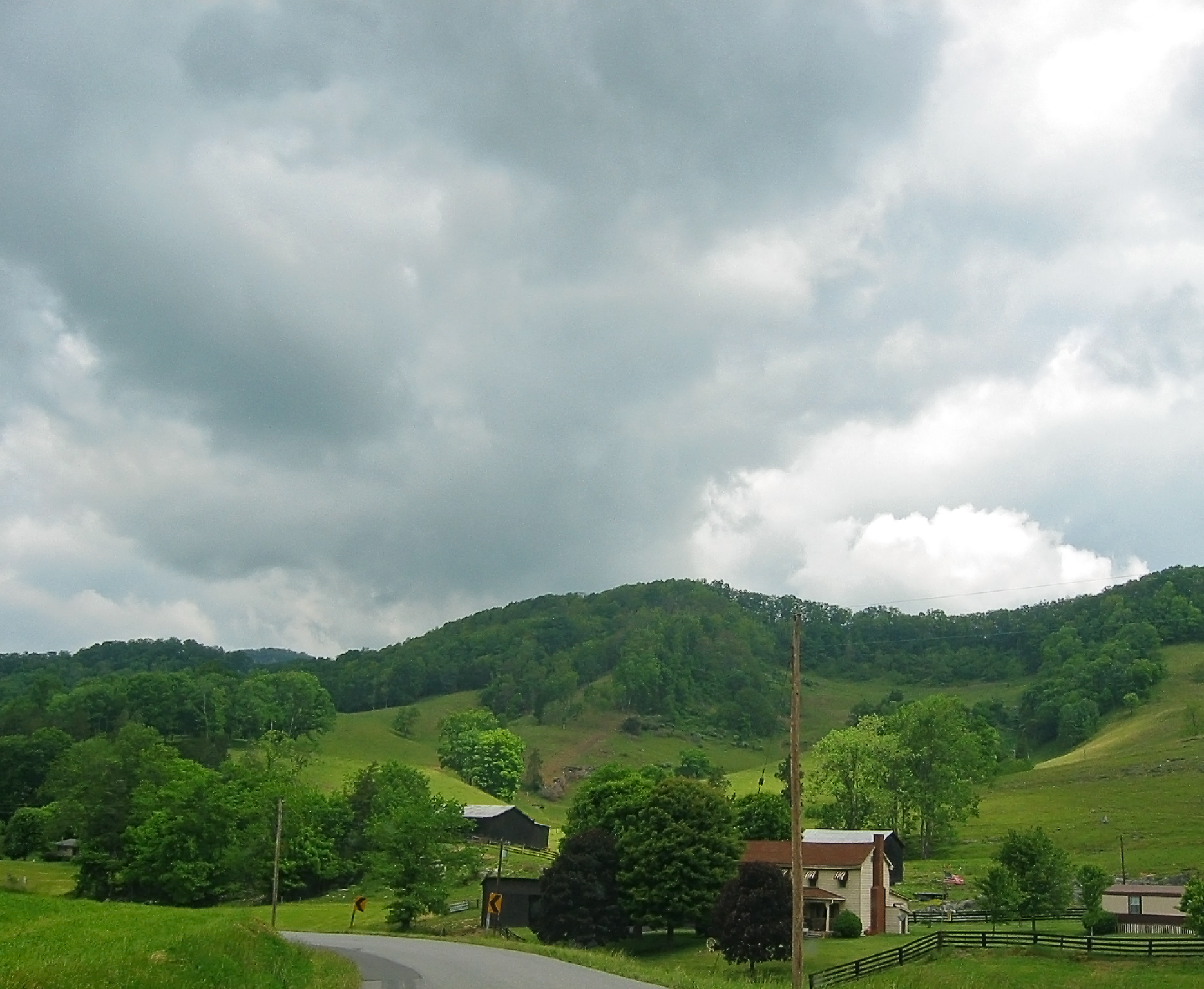
Lee County landscape near Pennington Gap

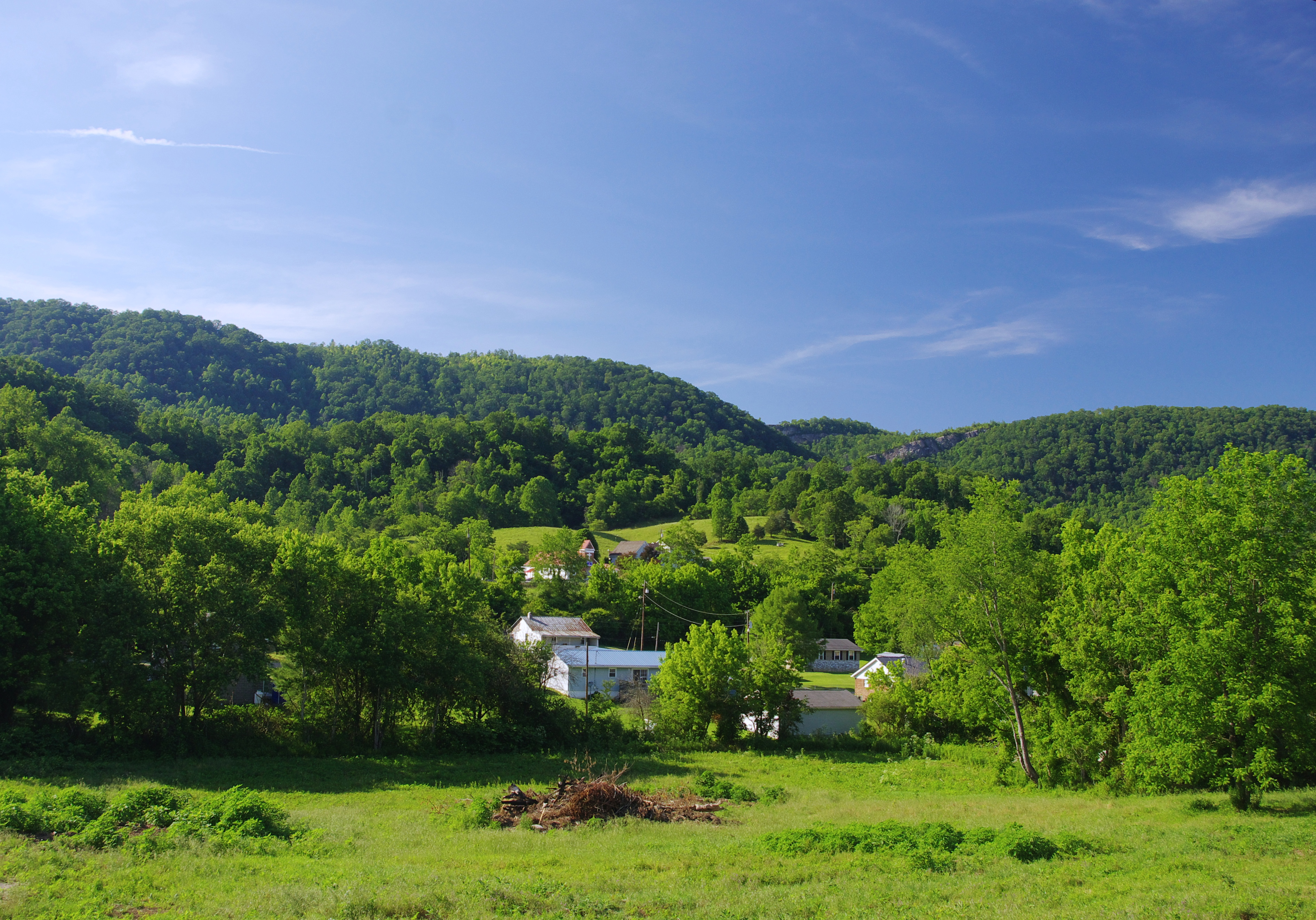
Mountains near Rose Hill

According to the U.S. Census Bureau, the county has a total area of 437 square miles (1,130 km^{2}), of which 436 square miles (1,130 km^{2}) is land and 1.9 square miles (4.9 km^{2}) (0.4%) is water. Lee County is one of the 423 counties served by the Appalachian Regional Commission, and it is identified as part of "Greater Appalachia" by Colin Woodard in his book American Nations: A History of the Eleven Rival Regional Cultures of North America.

All of Lee County lies longitudinally west of West Virginia. The entirety of Lee County is physically closer to eight state capitals other than its own capital in Richmond: Raleigh, North Carolina; Columbia, South Carolina; Atlanta, Georgia; Nashville, Tennessee; Charleston, West Virginia; Frankfort, Kentucky; Columbus, Ohio; and Indianapolis, Indiana. Additionally, the far western part of Lee County–including Wheeler and the Cumberland Gap, roughly 350 miles (560 km) from Richmond–is closer to Montgomery, Alabama, a ninth state capital.

The county contains karst, a type of topography, within an area of Ordovician limestone called "the Cedars." The Powell River flows through Lee County on its way to Tennessee.

=== Districts ===
The county is divided into seven districts: Jonesville, Rocky Station, Rocky Station Mineral, Rose Hill, White Shoals, Yoakum, and Yoakum Mineral. There are two towns: Pennington Gap, and Jonesville.

=== Adjacent counties ===
- Wise County – northeast
- Scott County – east
- Hancock County, Tennessee – south
- Claiborne County, Tennessee – south-southwest
- Bell County, Kentucky – west
- Harlan County, Kentucky – northwest

=== National protected areas ===
- Cumberland Gap National Historical Park (part)
- Jefferson National Forest (part)

=== State protected areas ===
- The Cedars Natural Area Preserve

=== Major routes ===
- US 23
- US 58
- US 58 Alt.
- US 421
- SR 70
- SR 352
- SR 600

== Demographics ==
Historical population
Census	Pop.	Note	%±
1800	3,538		—
1810	4,694		32.7%
1820	4,256		−9.3%
1830	6,461		51.8%
1840	8,441		30.6%
1850	10,267		21.6%
1860	11,032		7.5%
1870	13,268		20.3%
1880	15,116		13.9%
1890	18,216		20.5%
1900	19,856		9.0%
1910	23,840		20.1%
1920	25,293		6.1%
1930	30,419		20.3%
1940	39,296		29.2%
1950	36,106		−8.1%
1960	25,824		−28.5%
1970	20,321		−21.3%
1980	25,956		27.7%
1990	24,496		−5.6%
2000	23,589		−3.7%
2010	25,587		8.5%
2020	22,173		−13.3%
2025 (est.)	21,642	▼	−2.4%
U.S. Decennial Census 1900–1990; 1990–2000 2010 2020

=== Racial and ethnic composition ===
Lee County, Virginia – Racial and ethnic composition Note: the US Census treats Hispanic/Latino as an ethnic category. This table excludes Latinos from the racial categories and assigns them to a separate category. Hispanics/Latinos may be of any race.
Race / Ethnicity (NH = Non-Hispanic)	Pop 1980	Pop 1990	Pop 2000	Pop 2010	Pop 2020	% 1980	% 1990	% 2000	% 2010	% 2020
White alone (NH)	25,687	24,240	23,132	23,893	20,193	98.96%	98.95%	98.06%	93.38%	91.07%
Black or African American alone (NH)	89	91	103	909	868	0.34%	0.37%	0.44%	3.55%	3.91%
Native American or Alaska Native alone (NH)	44	26	51	96	69	0.17%	0.11%	0.22%	0.38%	0.31%
Asian alone (NH)	13	20	38	55	39	0.05%	0.08%	0.16%	0.21%	0.18%
Native Hawaiian or Pacific Islander alone (NH)	x	x	1	8	0	x	x	0.00%	0.03%	0.00%
Other race alone (NH)	0	0	7	22	33	0.00%	0.00%	0.03%	0.09%	0.15%
Mixed race or Multiracial (NH)	x	x	137	198	495	x	x	0.58%	0.77%	2.23%
Hispanic or Latino (any race)	123	119	120	406	476	0.47%	0.49%	0.51%	1.59%	2.15%
Total	25,956	24,496	23,589	25,587	22,173	100.00%	100.00%	100.00%	100.00%	100.00%

=== 2020 census ===
As of the 2020 census, the county had a population of 22,173. The median age was 44.4 years. 19.3% of residents were under the age of 18 and 21.6% of residents were 65 years of age or older. For every 100 females there were 109.1 males, and for every 100 females age 18 and over there were 108.2 males age 18 and over.

The racial makeup of the county was 92.6% White, 4.0% Black or African American, 0.3% American Indian and Alaska Native, 0.2% Asian, 0.0% Native Hawaiian and Pacific Islander, 0.4% from some other race, and 2.6% from two or more races. Hispanic or Latino residents of any race comprised 2.1% of the population.

0.0% of residents lived in urban areas, while 100.0% lived in rural areas.

There were 9,067 households in the county, of which 25.1% had children under the age of 18 living with them and 28.6% had a female householder with no spouse or partner present. About 31.7% of all households were made up of individuals and 15.5% had someone living alone who was 65 years of age or older.

There were 10,835 housing units, of which 16.3% were vacant. Among occupied housing units, 71.5% were owner-occupied and 28.5% were renter-occupied. The homeowner vacancy rate was 2.1% and the rental vacancy rate was 10.6%.

=== 2010 census ===
As of the 2010 United States census, there were 25,587 people living in the county. 94.2% were White, 3.7% Black or African American, 0.4% Native American, 0.2% Asian, 0.6% of some other race and 0.9% of two or more races. 1.6% were Hispanic or Latino (of any race).

The largest ancestry groups in Lee County include: English (14 percent), Irish (11 percent), German (9 percent), and Scottish-Irish (3 percent).

There were 9,706 households, out of which 29.0 percent had children under the age of 18 living with them, 55.0 percent were married couples living together, 11.7 percent had a female householder with no husband present, and 29.4 percent were non-families. 27.0 percent of all households were made up of individuals, and 12.1 percent had someone living alone who was 65 years of age or older. The average household size was 2.41 and the average family size was 2.91.

In the county, the population was spread out, with 22.8 percent under the age of 18, 8.0 percent from 18 to 24, 27.5 percent from 25 to 44, 26.3 percent from 45 to 64, and 15.4 percent who were 65 years of age or older. The median age was 40 years. For every 100 females there were 94.2 males. For every 100 females age 18 and over, there were 91.3 males.

The median income for a household in the county was $29,889, and the median income for a family was $40,721. The per capita income for the county was $16,317. About 20.3 percent of families and 22.7 percent of the population were below the poverty line, including 30.1 percent of those under age 18 and 23.3 percent of those age 65 or over.

== Law enforcement ==
Lee County Sheriff's Office
- Abbreviation: LCSO

Agency overview
- Employees: 42

Jurisdictional structure
- Constituting instrument: Yes
- General nature: Local civilian police

Operational structure
- Headquarters: Jonesville, Virginia
- Deputies: 39
- Civilians: 3
- Agency executive: Gary B. Parsons, Sheriff

Website
- Official Website

The Lee County Sheriff's Office (LCSO) is currently headed by Gary B. Parsons, who has held the role since 1996, and is the longest-serving sheriff in Lee County's history.

== Politics ==
Voters in Lee County swung between Democratic and Republican presidential candidates throughout much of the twentieth century and generally made the region a bellwether county. Between 1920 and 2004, the county backed the nationwide winner on all but three occasions (1948, 1980, and 1988). Since the beginning of the twenty-first century, the county has become more consistently Republican, giving Donald Trump over 80% of the vote in all three of his campaigns. Republicans have consistently won local elections in recent years, as well.

United States presidential election results for Lee County, Virginia
Year	Republican		Democratic		Third party(ies)	
Year	No.	%	No.	%	No.	%
1912	699	30.16%	1,023	44.13%	596	25.71%
1916	1,569	54.69%	1,287	44.86%	13	0.45%
1920	2,162	57.48%	1,592	42.33%	7	0.19%
1924	2,456	49.66%	2,376	48.04%	114	2.30%
1928	3,337	58.34%	2,383	41.66%	0	0.00%
1932	1,985	40.39%	2,892	58.84%	38	0.77%
1936	2,066	33.33%	4,120	66.46%	13	0.21%
1940	2,623	38.52%	4,180	61.39%	6	0.09%
1944	3,921	46.68%	4,470	53.22%	8	0.10%
1948	4,297	50.76%	4,069	48.06%	100	1.18%
1952	4,622	51.99%	4,242	47.71%	27	0.30%
1956	4,548	54.77%	3,714	44.73%	42	0.51%
1960	3,363	46.29%	3,867	53.23%	35	0.48%
1964	3,463	40.15%	5,151	59.71%	12	0.14%
1968	4,450	47.35%	4,105	43.67%	844	8.98%
1972	4,957	62.39%	2,825	35.56%	163	2.05%
1976	4,679	45.50%	5,415	52.65%	190	1.85%
1980	4,417	47.10%	4,758	50.74%	202	2.15%
1984	5,365	50.83%	5,085	48.18%	104	0.99%
1988	4,080	45.11%	4,906	54.24%	59	0.65%
1992	3,504	35.77%	5,215	53.24%	1,077	10.99%
1996	3,225	37.48%	4,444	51.65%	935	10.87%
2000	4,551	52.02%	4,031	46.08%	166	1.90%
2004	5,664	57.97%	4,005	40.99%	101	1.03%
2008	5,825	63.13%	3,219	34.89%	183	1.98%
2012	6,847	71.34%	2,583	26.91%	168	1.75%
2016	7,543	80.25%	1,627	17.31%	229	2.44%
2020	8,365	84.10%	1,489	14.97%	92	0.92%
2024	8,674	85.69%	1,391	13.74%	57	0.56%

== Education ==
The Lee County Public Schools operates eleven schools, including two high schools and one technical school.

=== Public high schools ===
- Lee High School, Jonesville
- Thomas Walker High School, Ewing

=== Public middle schools ===
- Elydale Middle School, Ewing
- Jonesville Middle School, Jonesville
- Pennington Middle School, Pennington Gap

=== Public elementary schools ===
- Dryden Elementary School, Dryden
- Elk Knob Elementary School, Pennington Gap
- Flatwoods Elementary School, Jonesville
- Rose Hill Elementary School, Rose Hill
- St. Charles Elementary School, St. Charles

==== Former ====
Pennington Elementary School, consisting of three buildings built at various times (1912, 1917, and 1937), was demolished in 1989, and a bank was constructed on its Morgan Avenue site. Three other elementary schools, Ewing, Keokee, and Stickleyville, were closed in June 2012.

=== Technical schools ===
- Lee County Career & Technical Center, Ben Hur

== Communities ==
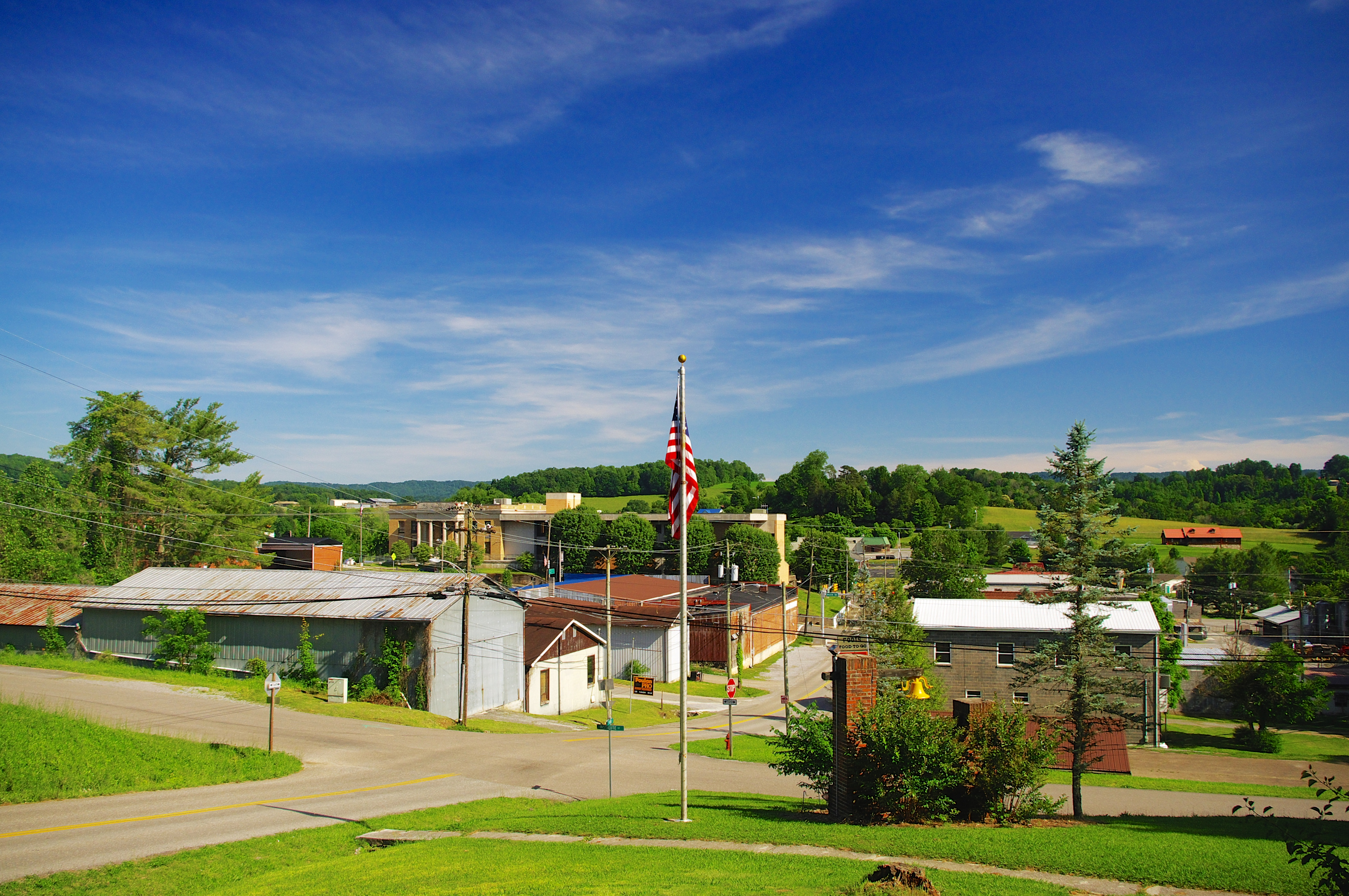
Jonesville

=== Towns ===
- Jonesville
- Pennington Gap

=== Census-designated places ===
- Dryden
- Ewing
- Keokee
- Rose Hill
- St. Charles
- Stickleyville

=== Other unincorporated communities ===
- Ben Hur
- Blackwater
- Calvin
- Darbyville
- Dot
- Ewing
- Gibson Station
- Hubbard Springs
- Jasper
- Monarch
- Ocoonita
- Olinger
- Pocket
- Seminary
- Stone Creek
- Van
- Wheeler
- Woodway

== Notable people ==
- Frank Rowlett, cryptologist, member of the Signals Intelligence Service
- Carol Wood, mathematician
- Campbell Slemp, congressman
- Andrew Taylor Still, founder of osteopathic medicine
- William C. Wampler, U.S. Representative
- Barry Audia, professional boxer
- Jim Pankovits, Major League Baseball player
- Elbert S. Martin, congressman
- John Preston Martin, U.S. Representative from Kentucky
- Steve Rasnic Tem, author
- Glen Morgan Williams, federal judge
- Don Newton, comic artist
- James Buchanan Richmond, congressman
- C. Bascom Slemp, congressman
- Claude Ely, singer/songwriter
- Walker Cress, Major League Baseball player
- Cynthia D Kinser, Chief Justice of the Supreme Court of Virginia
- Pete DeBusk, founder of DeRoyal Industries

== In popular culture ==
- Demon Copperhead by Barbara Kingsolver is a 2022 novel inspired by David Copperfield by Charles Dickens, published in 1850. Kingsolver's novel is set in Lee County and the eponymous Demon Copperhead, like Copperfield, is born in poverty and becomes an orphan.

== See also ==
- Lee County Sheriff's Office (Virginia)
- National Register of Historic Places listings in Lee County, Virginia
