= National Register of Historic Places listings in Hawkins County, Tennessee =

Location of Hawkins County in Tennessee

This is a list of the National Register of Historic Places listings in Hawkins County, Tennessee.

This is intended to be a complete list of the properties and districts on the National Register of Historic Places in Hawkins County, Tennessee, United States. Latitude and longitude coordinates are provided for many National Register properties and districts; these locations may be seen together in a map.

There are 12 properties and districts listed on the National Register in the county.

Contents: Counties in Tennessee
Anderson – Bedford – Benton – Bledsoe – Blount – Bradley – Campbell – Cannon – Carroll – Carter – Cheatham – Chester – Claiborne – Clay – Cocke – Coffee – Crockett – Cumberland – Davidson – Decatur – DeKalb – Dickson – Dyer – Fayette – Fentress – Franklin – Gibson – Giles – Grainger – Greene – Grundy – Hamblen – Hamilton – Hancock – Hardeman – Hardin – Hawkins – Haywood – Henderson – Henry – Hickman – Houston – Humphreys – Jackson – Jefferson – Johnson – Knox – Lake – Lauderdale – Lawrence – Lewis – Lincoln – Loudon – Macon – Madison – Marion – Marshall – Maury – McMinn – McNairy – Meigs – Monroe – Montgomery – Moore – Morgan – Obion – Overton – Perry – Pickett – Polk – Putnam – Rhea – Roane – Robertson – Rutherford – Scott – Sequatchie – Sevier – Shelby – Smith – Stewart – Sullivan – Sumner – Tipton – Trousdale – Unicoi – Union – Van Buren – Warren – Washington – Wayne – Weakley – White – Williamson – Wilson

This National Park Service list is complete through NPS recent listings posted March 14, 2025.

== Current listings ==
	Name on the Register	Image	Date listed	Location	City or town	Description
1	Amis House	Amis House	June 19, 1973 (#73001786)	East of Rogersville on Burem Pike; 36°25′10″N 82°57′21″W	Rogersville	Built in the 1780s by Hawkins County pioneer Thomas Amis. Inventory form.
2	Boatyard Historic District	Boatyard Historic District	December 12, 1973 (#73001785)	Southwest of Kingsport on Holston and the South Fork of the Holston River; 36°33′02″N 82°36′17″W	Kingsport	
3	Bulls Gap Historic District	Bulls Gap Historic District	July 30, 1987 (#87001232)	S. Main, Church, McGregor, Price, and Mill Sts. 36°15′11″N 83°05′15″W	Bulls Gap	
4	Fudge Farm	Fudge Farm	December 12, 1976 (#76001783)	Northeast of Surgoinsville on U.S. Route 11W; 36°29′11″N 82°49′36″W	Surgoinsville	Built in the early 1850s by local planter Conrad Fudge. Inventory form.
5	Long Meadow	Long Meadow	January 11, 1974 (#74001915)	North of Surgoinsville off U.S. Route 11W; 36°30′05″N 82°51′20″W	Surgoinsville	18th-century house located in Carters Valley. Inventory form.
6	Moore Family Farm		May 3, 2006 (#06000343)	483 VFW Rd. 36°16′01″N 83°04′02″W	Bulls Gap	
7	New Providence Presbyterian Church, Academy, and Cemetery	New Providence Presbyterian Church, Academy, and Cemetery	December 1, 1978 (#78002600)	Northeast of Surgoinsville off U.S. Route 11W; 36°29′43″N 82°49′26″W	Surgoinsville	Inventory form.
8	Pressmen's Home Historic District	Pressmen's Home Historic District	November 20, 1985 (#85002970)	State Route 94; 36°27′00″N 83°03′15″W	Pressmen's Home	
9	Price Public Elementary School	Price Public Elementary School	November 10, 1988 (#88002538)	Hasson and Spring Sts. 36°24′34″N 83°00′32″W	Rogersville	Built in 1922 for the town's African-American community; now a community center and museum. Inventory form.
10	Rogersville Historic District	Rogersville Historic District	February 23, 1973 (#73001787)	Bounded by N. Boyd, Kyle, Clinch, and N. Bend Sts., McKinney Ave., and S. Rogen Rd. 36°24′26″N 83°00′19″W	Rogersville	Contributing properties in the district include Hale Springs Inn, ca. 1824; Hawkins County Courthouse, ca. 1836; and Overton Lodge, ca. 1840.
11	St. Marks Presbyterian Church	St. Marks Presbyterian Church	March 10, 2006 (#06000132)	Junction of N. Hassen and W. Kyle Sts. 36°24′34″N 83°00′29″W	Rogersville	Built in 1912 by Rogersville's African-American community; Inventory form.
12	Stony Point	Stony Point	April 26, 1973 (#73001788)	Northeast of Surgoinsville on U.S. Route 11W; 36°29′21″N 82°49′17″W	Surgoinsville	

== See also ==
- List of National Historic Landmarks in Tennessee
- National Register of Historic Places listings in Tennessee
