= Flag of Hawkins County, Tennessee =

U.S. county flag

Hawkins County
- Adopted: 1999
- Design: A blue field bearing six, five-pointed and golden stars with a Tennessee-style white and gold fly end; the county seal is trimmed in gold and placed within a white disc in the upper, hoist side
- Designed by: Dillon Barker

The flag in front of the seat of county government, the Hawkins County Courthouse in Rogersville.

The flag of Hawkins County, Tennessee, is the official flag of Hawkins County, Tennessee. It was designed by 15-year-old Dillon Barker, a local high school student, and adopted by the Board of County Commissioners (the county legislative body) in 1999.

== Design ==
=== Flag arrangement and symbolism ===
The flag consists of a blue field and a Tennessee-style white and gold fly and is purposely modeled after the Tennessee state flag. The field bears six, five-pointed and golden stars. The stars represent the six incorporated municipalities of the county and are arranged as they would appear on a map. The county seal is trimmed in gold and placed within a white disc on the upper, hoist side of the flag. The gold bar is said to represent those who do not live within one of the municipalities.

=== County seal ===
The seal of Hawkins County, Tennessee, was designed by the first Board of Trustees to govern the county after it transitioned from Spencer County, North Carolina, to Hawkins County, North Carolina, in 1787. The seal bears the all-seeing Eye of Providence, over-seeing the scales of justice. The year "1787" notes the year the county's current name was established by the North Carolina General Assembly.

The county became a part of Tennessee in 1796, when the state was established.

== History ==
The flag was designed in 1999 by Dillon Barker, a fifteen-year-old student at Cherokee High School. Barker petitioned the county commissioners on his own and persuaded them to adopt the flag. Barker purposely based the flag on the Tennessee flag and designed the flag to represent the towns of the county as they would appear on a map. The resolution approving the flag's design was adopted unanimously, but no action was taken on procuring or raising it.

In June 2008, a member of the Board of County Commissioners, Linda Kimbro, placed a resolution before the Board to procure the flag and fly it from the flagpole at the Hawkins County Courthouse in downtown Rogersville. After some debate the resolution was approved, and Hawkins County Mayor Crockett Lee had the flag made for the first time.

It was flown for the first time at the Courthouse in Rogersville during the Raising of the Colors Ceremony at Heritage Days on October 10, 2009.
