= Hotel Yancey =

Hotel Yancey or The Hotel Yancey may refer to:

- Hotel Yancey (North Platte, Nebraska), listed on the NRHP in Lincoln County, Nebraska
- The Hotel Yancey (Grand Island, Nebraska), also NRHP-listed

== See also ==
- Yancey's Tavern, Kingsport, Tennessee, listed on the NRHP in Tennessee
