= List of the oldest buildings in Tennessee =

This article lists the oldest extant buildings in Tennessee, including extant buildings and structures constructed prior to and during the United States rule over Tennessee. Only buildings built prior to 1800 are suitable for inclusion on this list, or the building must be the oldest of its type.

In order to qualify for the list, a structure must:

- be a recognizable building (defined as any human-made structure used or intended for supporting or sheltering any use or continuous occupancy);
- incorporate features of building work from the claimed date to at least 1.5 metres (4.9 ft) in height and/or be a listed building.

This consciously excludes ruins of limited height, roads and statues. Bridges may be included if they otherwise fulfill the above criteria. Dates for many of the oldest structures have been arrived at by radiocarbon dating or dendrochronology and should be considered approximate. If the exact year of initial construction is estimated, it will be shown as a range of dates.

== List of oldest buildings ==
Building	Image	Location	First built	Use	Notes
Long Meadow		Surgoinsville	1762-64	Residence	Original log structure is within the walls of current home.
Edward Cox House		Bluff City	1774	Residence	
Bean Fort		Johnson City	1775	Fort	Built by William Bean, the 1st permanent European-American settler in TN. Also known as Bean Fort-Spring; spring still runs below the structure.
Carter Mansion at Sycamore Shoals State Historic Area		Elizabethton	1775-80	Residence	Oldest frame house in Tennessee.
Robert Young Cabin		Johnson City	1776	Residence	Relocated to Optimist Park in 1978, moved to Winged Deer Park in 1996.
Christopher Taylor House		Jonesborough	1777	Residence	In 1974, the house was moved intact to downtown Jonesborough to save it from demolition.
Dungan's Mill and Stone House		Watauga	1778	Residence, Mill	The mill, later known as St. John, operated continuously from 1778 until 2011.
Yancey's Tavern		Kingsport	1779	Tavern	
Earnest Fort House		Chuckey	1779-84	Residence	
Amis House		Rogersville	1781-83	Residence	Oldest dam in Tennessee is on Big Creek below the house.
Sinking Creek Baptist Church		Johnson City	1783	Church	Oldest church in TN.
Tipton-Haynes House		Johnson City	1784	Residence	Part of Tipton-Haynes State Historic Site
Rock Castle (Hendersonville, Tennessee)		Hendersonville	1784-1791	Residence	Earliest known version of Federal Style architecture in Tennessee.
Acuff Chapel		Blountville	1786	Church	Oldest Methodist church in TN.
Dixona		Dixon Springs	1787-88	Residence	
Bowen–Campbell House		Goodlettsville	1789	Residence	
Log Cabin at The Tanglewood House		Clarksville	1790s	Residence	Purportedly the oldest log cabin in TN.
William Blount Mansion		Knoxville	1792	Residence	
Buckingham House (Sevierville, Tennessee)		Sevierville	1795	Residence	Home of military leader John Sevier.
Big Spring Union Church		Claiborne County	1795	Church	Log church, one of oldest church buildings in TN.
Chester Inn		Jonesborough	1797	Inn	Now operating as a state-owned museum.
Travellers Rest (Nashville, Tennessee)		Nashville	1799	Residence	Oldest home in Nashville open to the public.

== See also ==
- National Register of Historic Places listings in Tennessee
- History of Tennessee
- Oldest buildings in the United States
