= Long Meadow (Surgoinsville, Tennessee) =

Historic house in Tennessee, United States

- U.S. National Register of Historic Places
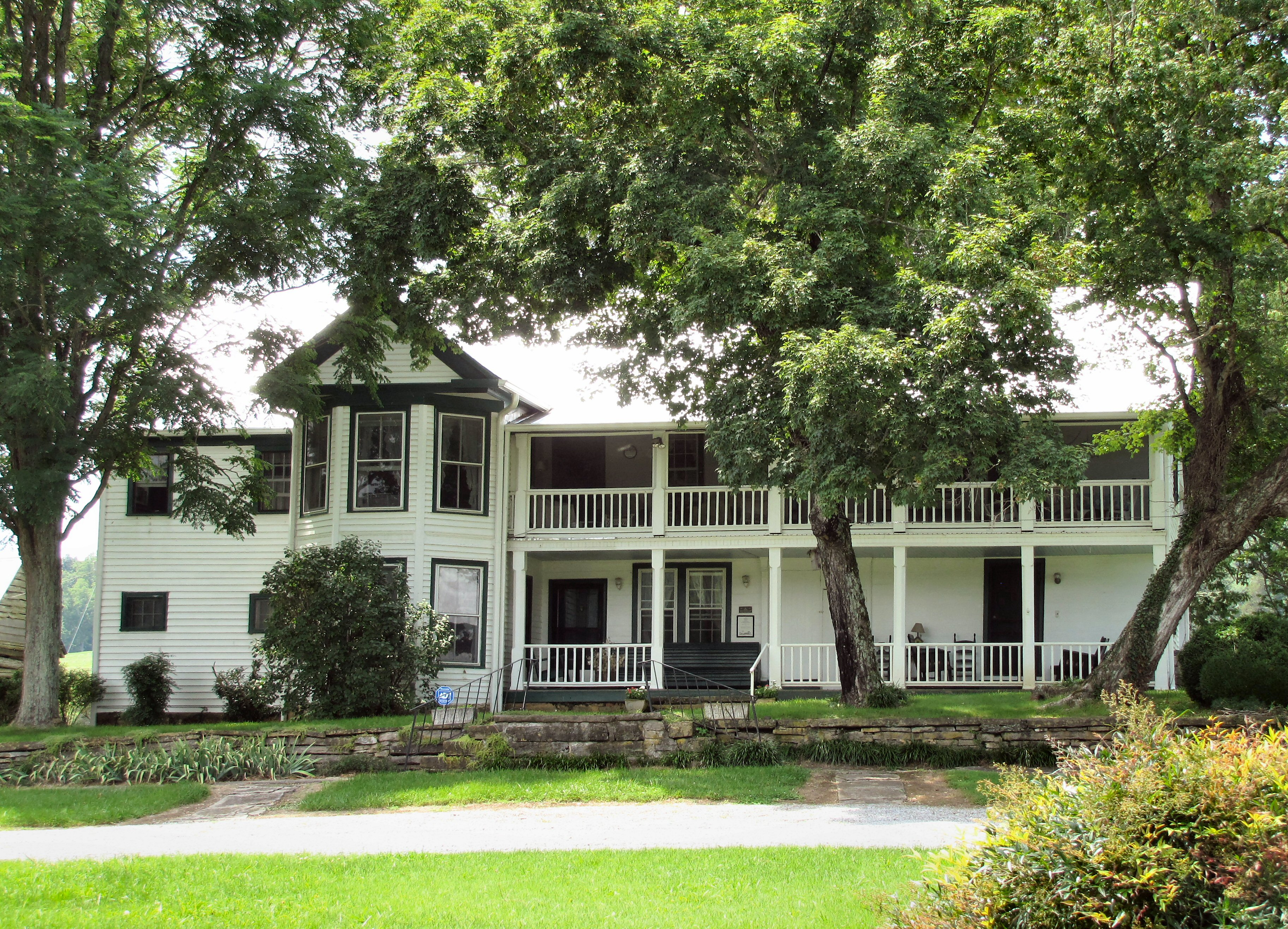

- Location within Tennessee Location within the United States
- Nearest city: Surgoinsville, Tennessee
- Coordinates: 36°30′05″N 82°51′20″W
- Area: 6 acres (2.4 ha)
- Built: 1763
- NRHP reference No.: 74001915
- Added to NRHP: January 11, 1974

Long Meadow is an historic house in Carters Valley in Hawkins County, Tennessee, near Surgoinsville. It was built in 1762 and is considered to be Tennessee's oldest wooden structure. It was erected on land that its builder, William Young, had received through a royal land grant. The house was originally a log structure, with several additions added in the 19th century.

It was listed on the National Register of Historic Places in 1974. The National Register listing includes the house and 6 acres (2.4 ha) of land.

== See also ==
- List of the oldest buildings in Tennessee
