= Bulls Gap Historic District =

Historic district in Tennessee, United States

- U.S. National Register of Historic Places
- U.S. Historic district
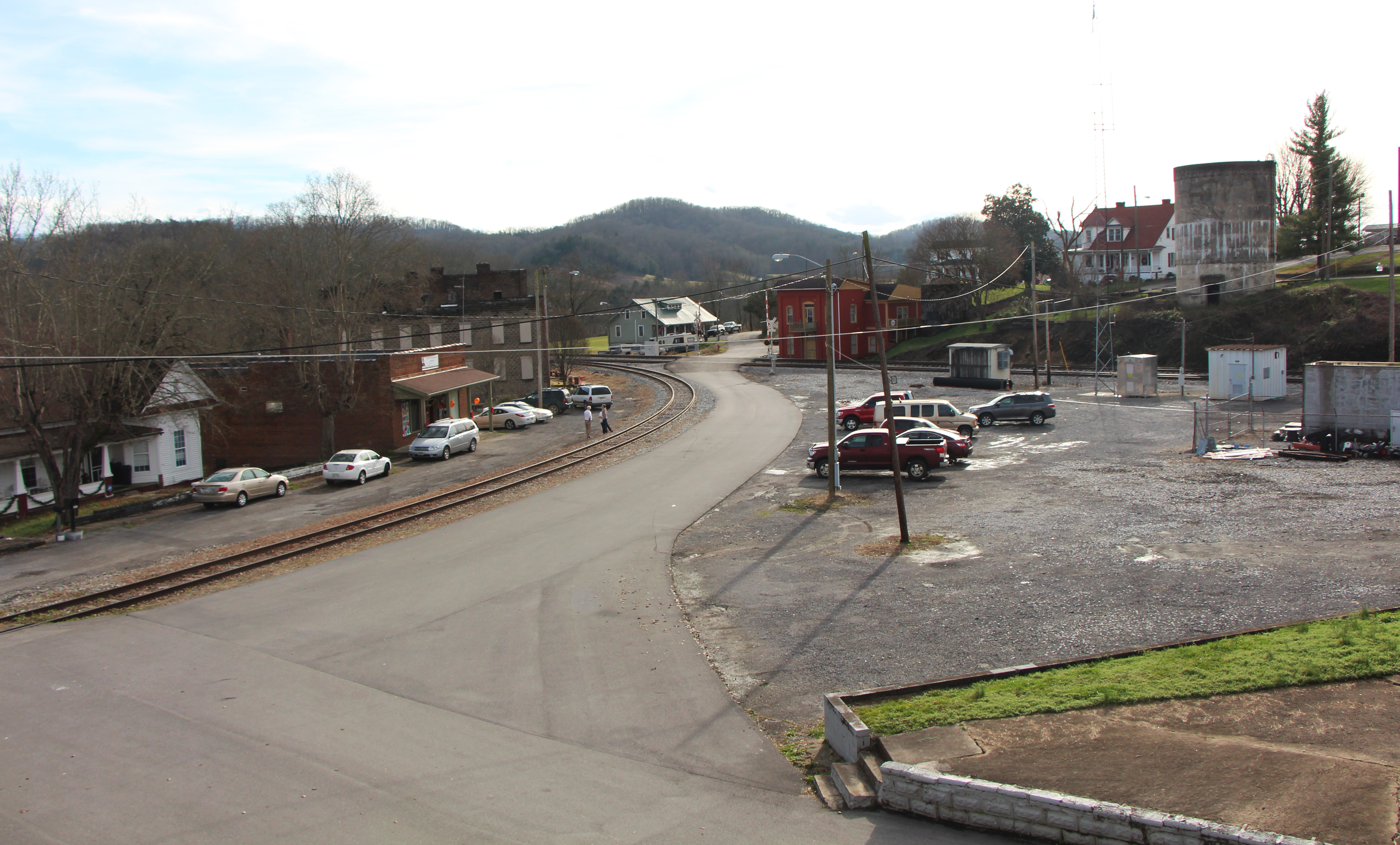
- Bulls Gap Historic District, Bulls Gap, Tennessee; looking south

- Location within Tennessee Location within the United States
- Location: S. Main, Church, McGregor, Price and Mill Sts., Bulls Gap, Tennessee
- Area: 24 acres (9.7 ha)
- Architectural style: Bungalow/craftsman, Queen Anne
- NRHP reference No.: 87001232
- Added to NRHP: July 30, 1987

The Bulls Gap Historic District is located in the town of Bulls Gap in the southeastern corner of Hawkins County in East Tennessee. The town of Bulls Gap is located near a pass or "gap" in Bays Mountain.

Two major rail lines pass through the Town of Bulls Gap, one running in a northeast-southwest direction and the other in a northwest-southeast direction. The two lines are connected by a number of spur lines that form a triangular area. The commercial section of old Bulls Gap is centered along this triangular area of tracks.

The majority of the buildings in the district are located along South Main Street, a long winding road that runs primarily in a north-south direction. The northernmost end of South Main Street begins at U.S. Route 11E and Tennessee State Route 66 and continues downhill. The northern end of South Main Street is primarily residential and the residential section extends a short way beyond the bridge until the second major turn in the road. At this point the commercial area begins with several store buildings centered around the tracks and the site of the former train depot. After South Main Street crosses the tracks and Church Street, the district once again becomes residential.

Forty-eight buildings and eight structures are considered as contributing resources to the Bulls Gap Historic District. Contributing buildings include twenty-two residences, two churches, ten commercial buildings, and fourteen outbuildings. Contributing structures include three water towers, two bridges, and three outbuildings.

In 1792 John Bull, a gunsmith, received a North Carolina land grant for fifty-five acres of land on Bays Mountain near an important east-west passageway over the mountain. Bull operated a stageline through this passageway which became known as Bull's Gap. Little information is known about the early settlement of Bulls Gap.

Because of the important railroad line through the mountains, Bulls Gap became a strategically important location for both sides of the Civil War. Bulls Gap became a fortified town and between 1863 and 1865 many battles were fought to gain control of the town and its railroad. Throughout most of the war, the Union Army retained control of Bulls Gap and the railroad.

== List of historic structures ==
Notable buildings in Bulls Gap National Historic District
Name	Year Built	Architectural Style	Comments
Parley Quillen Residence 105 Church St., Bulls Gap, TN	c. 1880	Vernacular architecture	
Marshall Residence 109 Church St., Bulls Gap, TN	c. 1895	Queen Anne	
Methodist Church 113 Church Street, Bulls Gap, TN	1931	Vernacular architecture	
Southern Railway Water Tower Church Street	c. 1910		Note large dentils circumscribed over door and near top
McCullough Residence 121 Church St., Bulls Gap, TN	c. 1870	Vernacular architecture	Also known as J. W. Blackburn House
Miller House 124 Church Street, Bulls Gap, TN	c. 1920	Vernacular architecture	Non-contributing
Residence 125 Church St., Bulls Gap, TN	c. 1925	Vernacular architecture	
Gilley Hotel 161 South Main Street, Bulls Gap, TN	c. 1895	Vernacular architecture	Gilly Hotel is two stories, and is attached to the Smith Hotel, which is three stories
Old Guima Hotel 100 South Main Street, Bulls Gap, TN	c. 1856	Vernacular architecture	Also known as Granny Feathers House; backside of building is 100 Church Street.
Smith Hotel South Main Street, Bulls Gap, TN	c. 1880	Vernacular architecture	Adjacent to Gilley Hotel, to the north
York Quillen Building 139 South Main Street, Bulls Gap, TN	c. 1900	Vernacular architecture	Now used as a museum and town hall
York Quillen Store 141 South Main Street, Bulls Gap, TN	c. 1880	Vernacular architecture	
Myers Residence 116 South Main Street, Bulls Gap, TN	c. 1895	Queen Anne Cottage	
Moody Residence 110 Mill Street, Bulls Gap, TN	c. 1900	American Craftsman	
J. B. Willoughby Building 148 South Main Street, Bulls Gap, TN	c. 1910	Vernacular commercial	Also known as the Bulls Gap Citizen Union Bank
Willoughby Residence 138 South Main Street, Bulls Gap, TN	c. 1905	Queen Anne and Colonial Revival architecture	Also known as Dr. W. Guy Justis House
McCollom House 132 South Main Street, Bulls Gap, TN	c. 1895	Gothic and Greek Revial elements, Vernacular	
First Baptist Church 121 South Main St, Bulls Gap, TN	c. 1925	Vernacular Gothic architecture	
