= Stony Point (Surgoinsville, Tennessee) =

- U.S. National Register of Historic Places
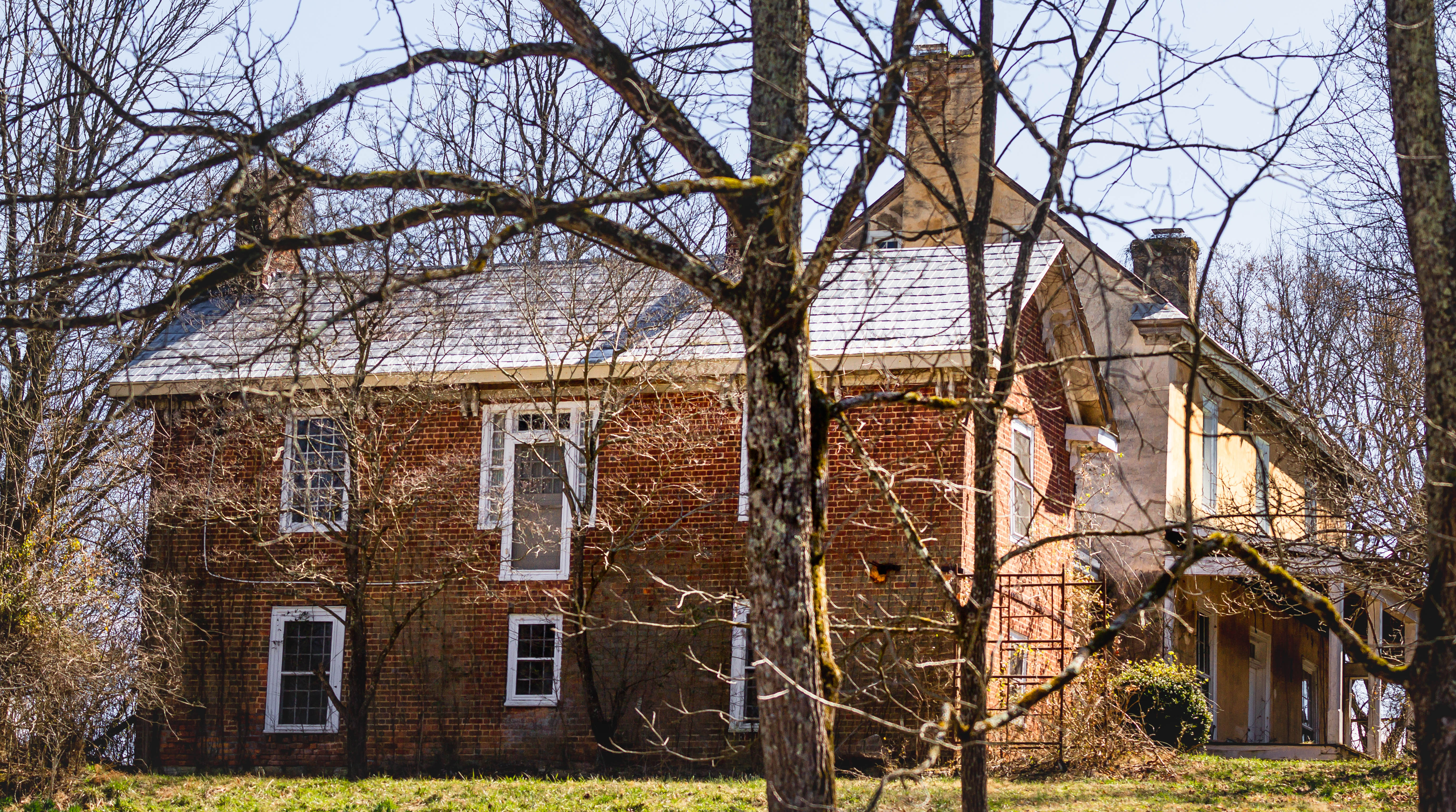

- Location within Tennessee Location within the United States
- Nearest city: Surgoinsville, Tennessee
- Coordinates: 36°29′21″N 82°49′17″W
- Area: 9 acres (3.6 ha)
- Built: 1790
- NRHP reference No.: 73001788
- Added to NRHP: April 26, 1973

Stony Point is a historic house in Surgoinsville, Tennessee, U.S.. It was built prior to 1791 on a land grant given to William Armstrong in the 1780s. It is "one of the earliest brick dwellings built in the state" of Tennessee. Armstrong lived here with his wife, née Elizabeth Galbraith, and their children. In 1797, Armstrong invited French King Louis Philippe to his estate. By the 1970s, the house had remained in the Armstrong family.

The house has been listed on the National Register of Historic Places since April 26, 1973.
