= Sinking Creek Baptist Church =

- Location: 2313 Elizabethton Hwy; Johnson City, Tennessee
- Country: United States
- Denomination: Baptist
- Website: sinkingcreek.org

History
- Former name: Watauga River Church
- Founded: 1772
- Founder: Matthew Talbot

Sinking Creek Baptist Church is a Baptist church located in Johnson City, Tennessee. It is affiliated with the Southern Baptist Convention. It is considered the oldest church in Tennessee.

== History ==
Founded in 1772 by Matthew Talbot, the church was originally named Watauga River Church after a local tributary. Talbot owned a large farm in the immediate area of Sycamore Shoals where the original Fort Caswell (originally named after North Carolina Governor Richard Caswell and later named Fort Watauga) was constructed on his property. Talbot also owned and operated a gristmill on located approximately one half mile from the fort on Gap Creek.

Threatened by local native Americans, the church disbanded in 1776 and reformed the following year. During the late September 1780 mustering of Overmountain Men, Talbot provide beeves and corn meal for the Overmountain Men (including three of his own family members) assembling prior to their march over the Appalachian Mountains to the October 7, 1780 Battle of Kings Mountain that occurred at present day location of Kings Mountain National Military Park near Blacksburg, South Carolina and along the North Carolina/South Carolina border.

In 1783 the original building was built with pews made of flat logs. A vehicle crashed into the church in 1965 and it was rebuilt.

== See also ==
- List of the oldest buildings in Tennessee
