= Great Stage Road =

Historic U.S. Road

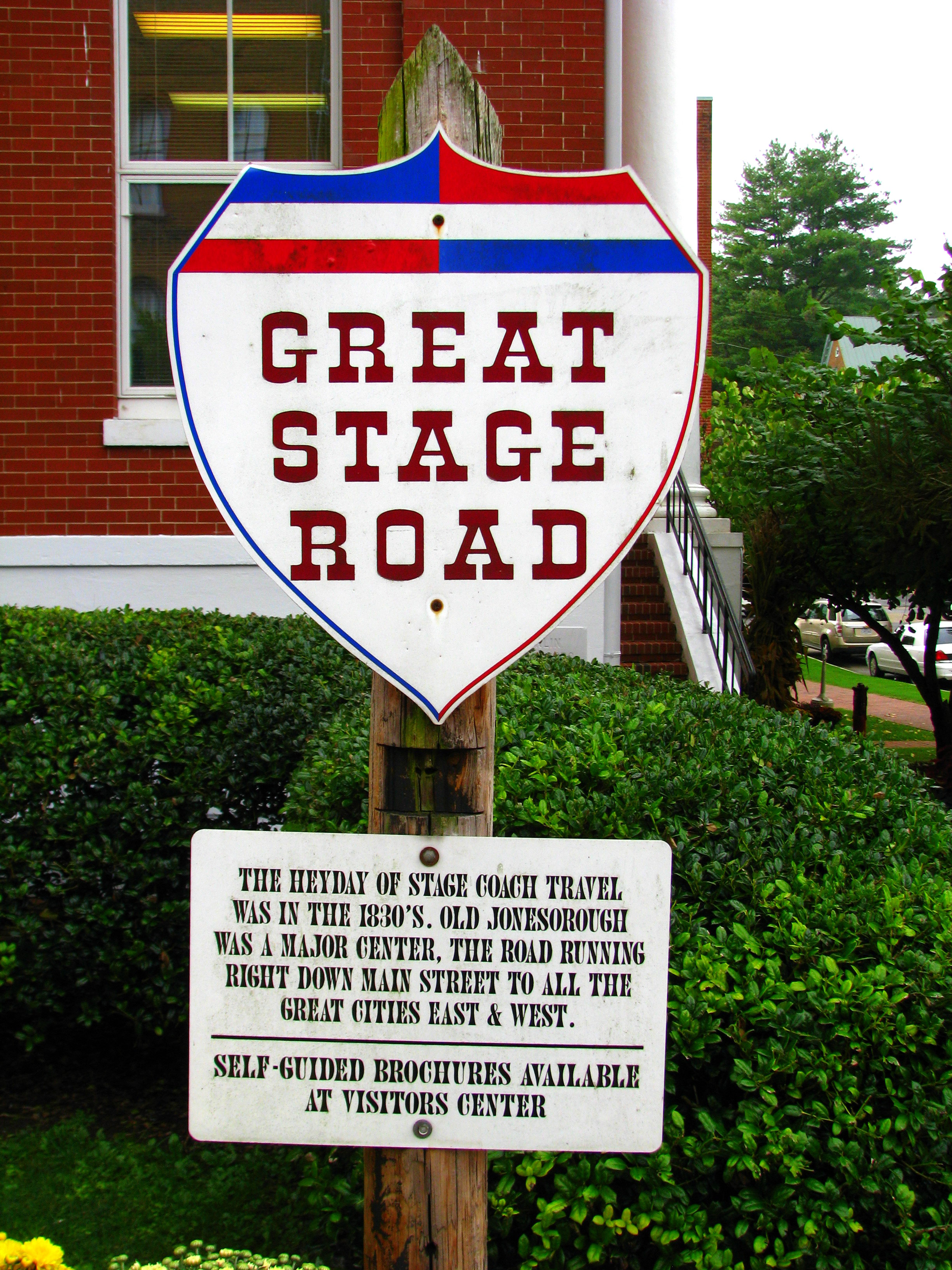
A replica sign on the Washington county courthouse lawn remembering the Great Stage Road

The Great Stage Road was a stagecoach route from Washington D.C, south to Knoxville, Tennessee, and west to Nashville, Tennessee. The road included several established routes such as the Great Valley Road, the Knoxville Road, the Nashville Road, and the Old Walton Road. The road followed much of today's U.S. Route 11.

== Purpose ==
By 1750, colonial fur traders and explorers began to cross over the Appalachians into Kentucky and Tennessee and return to many eastern communities with stories about rich lands to the west. The Great Stage Road and other stagecoach routes provided an efficient way to travel between the mountain range through the Cumberland Gap, a pass in the mountains where travel was easier. The Great Stage Road, along with many other stagecoach roads connected early American cities and towns. The Great Stage Road in particular was an essential route for everything from postal deliveries and newspaper circulation to places of rest for those on longer journeys.

== The Hale Springs Inn ==
Along the Great Stage Road, there were many towns and settlements. In these towns were Inns, where travellers could rest after a long day before preparing for their remaining journey. The Hale Springs Inn was built in 1824 in Rogersville, TN, and located only a few hundred feet off the Great Stage Road. During the nineteenth century, the inn hosted many notable people relevant in American history including those listed below.

== Kemmer Stand/Tavern ==
Outside Crossville, TN, along interstate 40, is a historical marker referencing Kemmer Stand/Tavern along Old Stage Road.

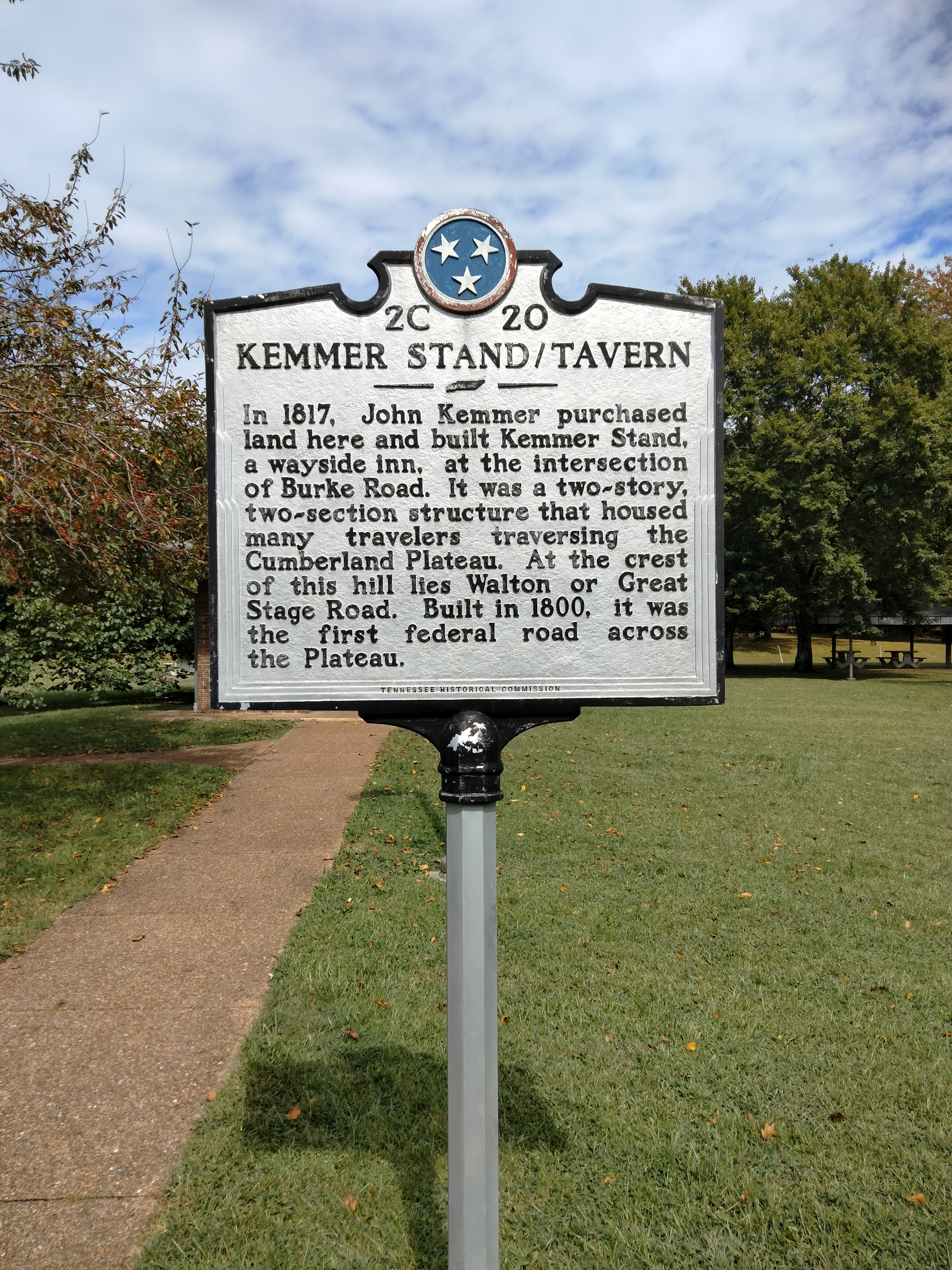
Tennessee Historical Commission Historical Marker 2 C 20 outside Crossville, TN Interstate 40 https://www.hmdb.org/m.asp?m=18194

The inscription reads:

"In 1817, John Kemmer purchased land here and built Kemmer Stand, a wayside inn, at the intersection of Burke Road. It was two-story, two-section structure that housed many travelers traversing the Cumberland Plateau. At the crest of this hill lies Walton or Great Stage Road. Built in 1800, it was the first federal road across the Plateau."

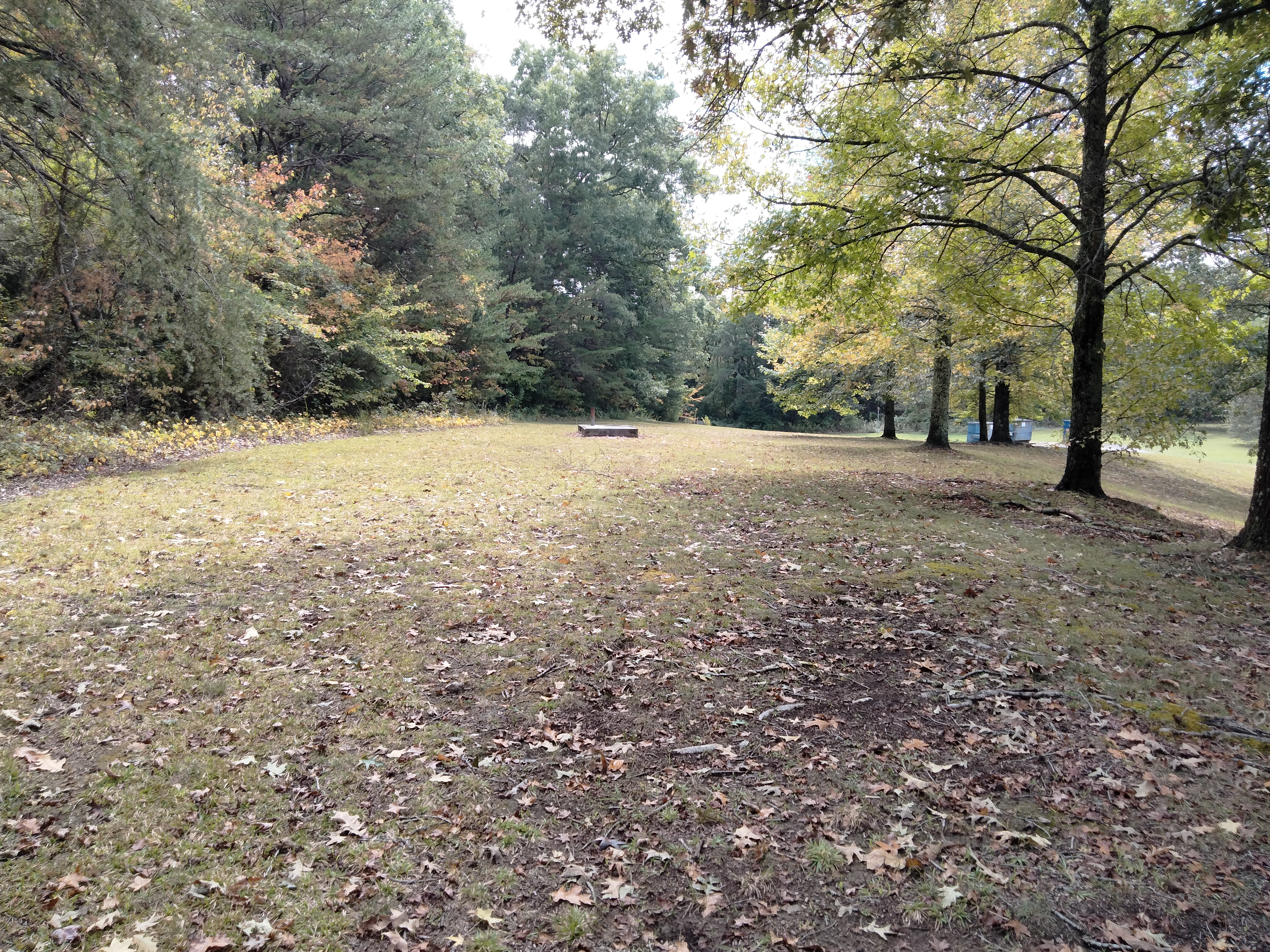
Segment of Great Stage Road in vicinity of Tennessee Historical Commission Historical Marker 2 C 20 outside Crossville, TN https://www.hmdb.org/m.asp?m=18194

== Historic Figures who Traveled Along the Road ==
Many relevant figures in American History traveled along The Great Stage Road, including:

- William Blout, one of many signers of the United States Constitution
- Andrew Jackson, former President of the United States
- Dr. Thomas Walker, surveyor and explorer
- Bishop Francis Asbury, founder of the Methodist Religion in America
- Governor John Sevier
- Daniel Boone
- Botanist Andre Michaux
- Captain William Walton, who would later construct a road from East Tennessee to Nashville
- James K. Polk, former President of the United States
- Andrew Johnson, former President of the United States
