= Big Spring Union Church =

Historic church in Tennessee, United States

- U.S. National Register of Historic Places
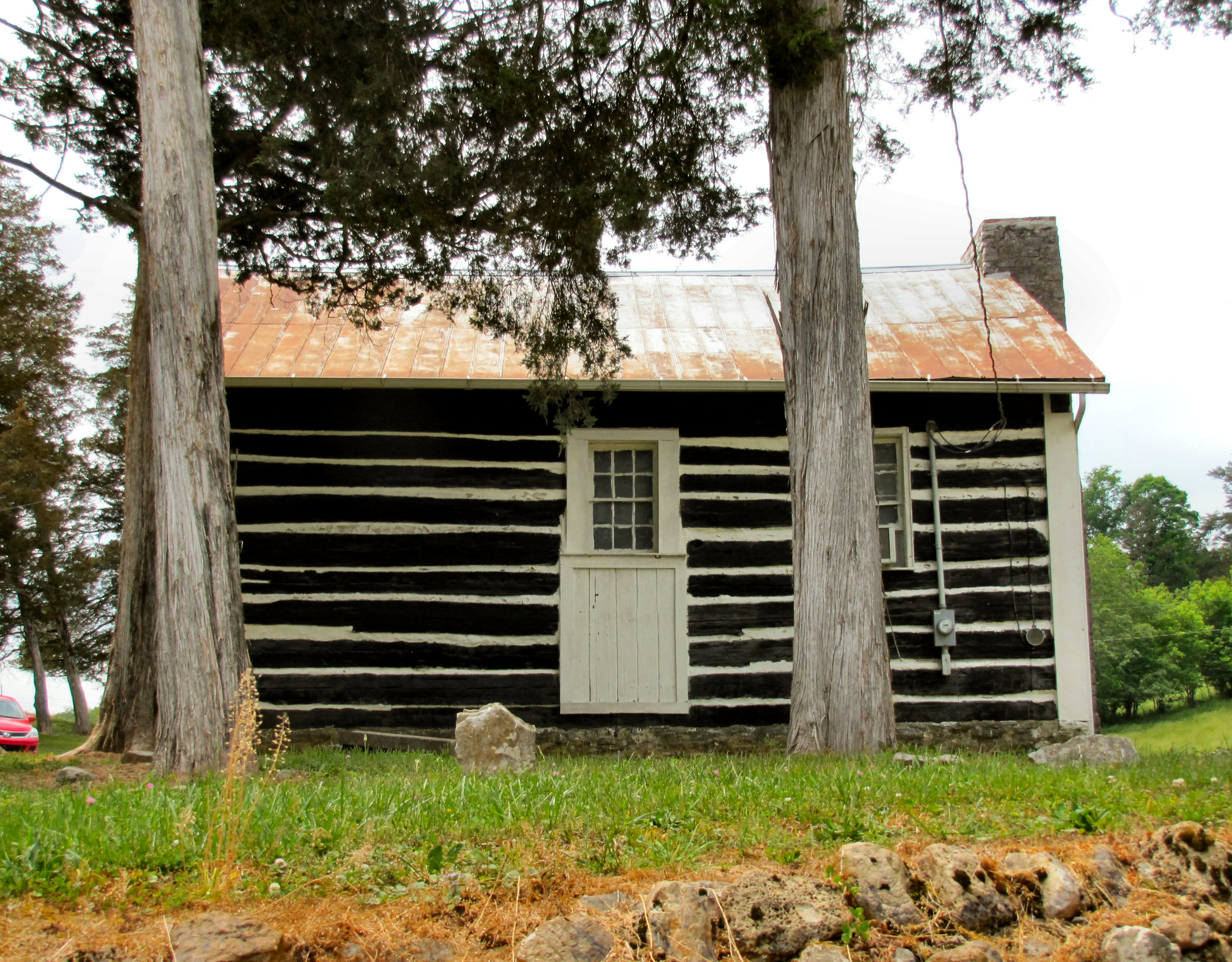

- Location within Tennessee Location within the United States
- Location: Lone Mountain Road, Springdale, Claiborne County, Tennessee
- Coordinates: 36°25′20″N 83°31′28″W
- Area: 3 acres (1.2 ha)
- Built: 1795
- NRHP reference No.: 75001739
- Added to NRHP: May 29, 1975

Big Spring Union Church, also known as Big Springs Primitive Baptist Church, is a historic church in Springdale, Claiborne County, Tennessee.

The church was built circa 1795 or 1796, and was known at first as Big Spring Meetinghouse. A Baptist church was organized at the site in 1800. During the Civil War, it served as a hospital for both Confederate and Union Army troops.

It is one of the oldest church buildings in Tennessee that is still in active use as a church. It was added to the National Register of Historic Places in 1975. The church is on Lone Mountain Road, off Tennessee State Route 32. The Tennessee State Library and Archives holds a copy of the records of Big Spring Primitive Baptist Church for the years 1800 through 1948.

== See also ==
- List of the oldest buildings in Tennessee
