= Midway, Hawkins County, Tennessee =

Midway
- Unincorporated community
- Location within Tennessee Location within the United States
- Coordinates: 36°33′45″N 82°52′24″W
- Country: United States
- State: Tennessee
- County: Hawkins
- Elevation: 1,457 ft (444 m)
- Time zone: UTC-5 (Eastern (EST))
  - Summer (DST): UTC-4 (EDT)
- Area code: 423
- GNIS feature ID: 1315504

Midway is an unincorporated community in Hawkins County, Tennessee. Midway is 9.3 miles (15.0 km) west-northwest of Church Hill.
