= New Providence Presbyterian Church, Academy, and Cemetery =

Historic site in Hawkins County, Tennessee, US

- U.S. National Register of Historic Places
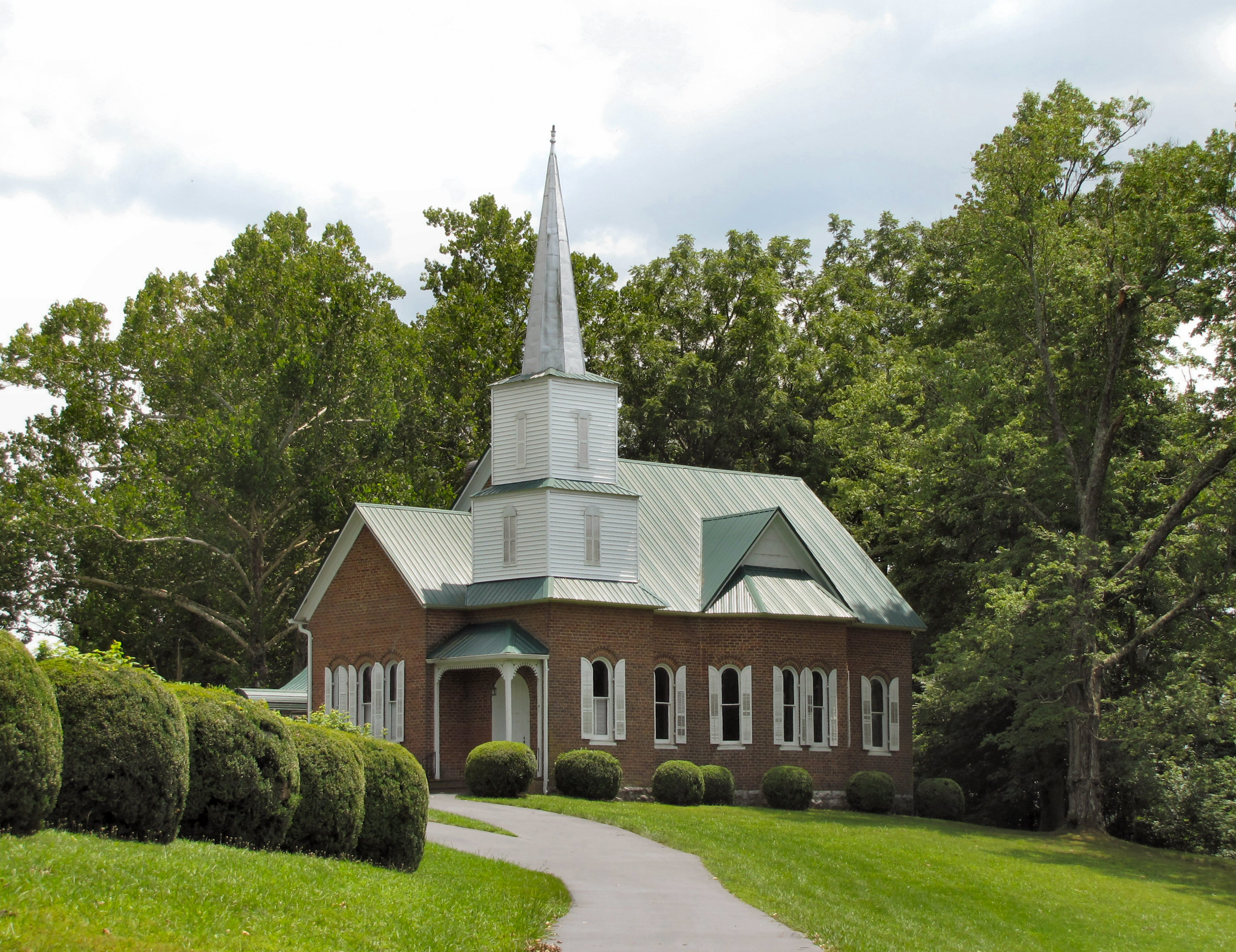
- New Providence Presbyterian Church

- Location within Tennessee Location within the United States
- Nearest city: Surgoinsville, Tennessee
- Coordinates: 36°29′40″N 82°49′23″W
- Area: 18 acres (7.3 ha)
- Architectural style: Gothic
- NRHP reference No.: 78002600
- Added to NRHP: December 1, 1978

New Providence Presbyterian Church is a historic church in Surgoinsville, Tennessee, United States, affiliated with Presbyterian Church (USA).

The New Providence congregation was formed in 1780 at the home of William Armstrong II in a settlement in Carter's Valley whose residents had come from Virginia, where they had belonged to another congregation called New Providence. The first services were led by the Reverend Samuel Doak and the Reverend Charles Cummins. The first church buildings were log structures in Carter's Valley. Until 1816, the church lacked its own minister, but was served by circuit-riding ministers who sometimes referred to New Providence as "Armstrong Settlement".

An early school was established at the church in 1816 and was associated with the church for many years. A separate building for the school was built in the early 1850s and was renamed "Maxwell Academy" (after early settler George Maxwell) in the 1870s. After this building burned, it was replaced by the current two-story brick building in 1901.

The present church building was completed in 1892–1893 and received an addition in the 1940s. The church building, its cemetery, and Maxwell Academy were added to the National Register of Historic Places in 1978.
