= Rogersville Historic District =

Historic district in Tennessee, United States

- U.S. National Register of Historic Places
- U.S. Historic district
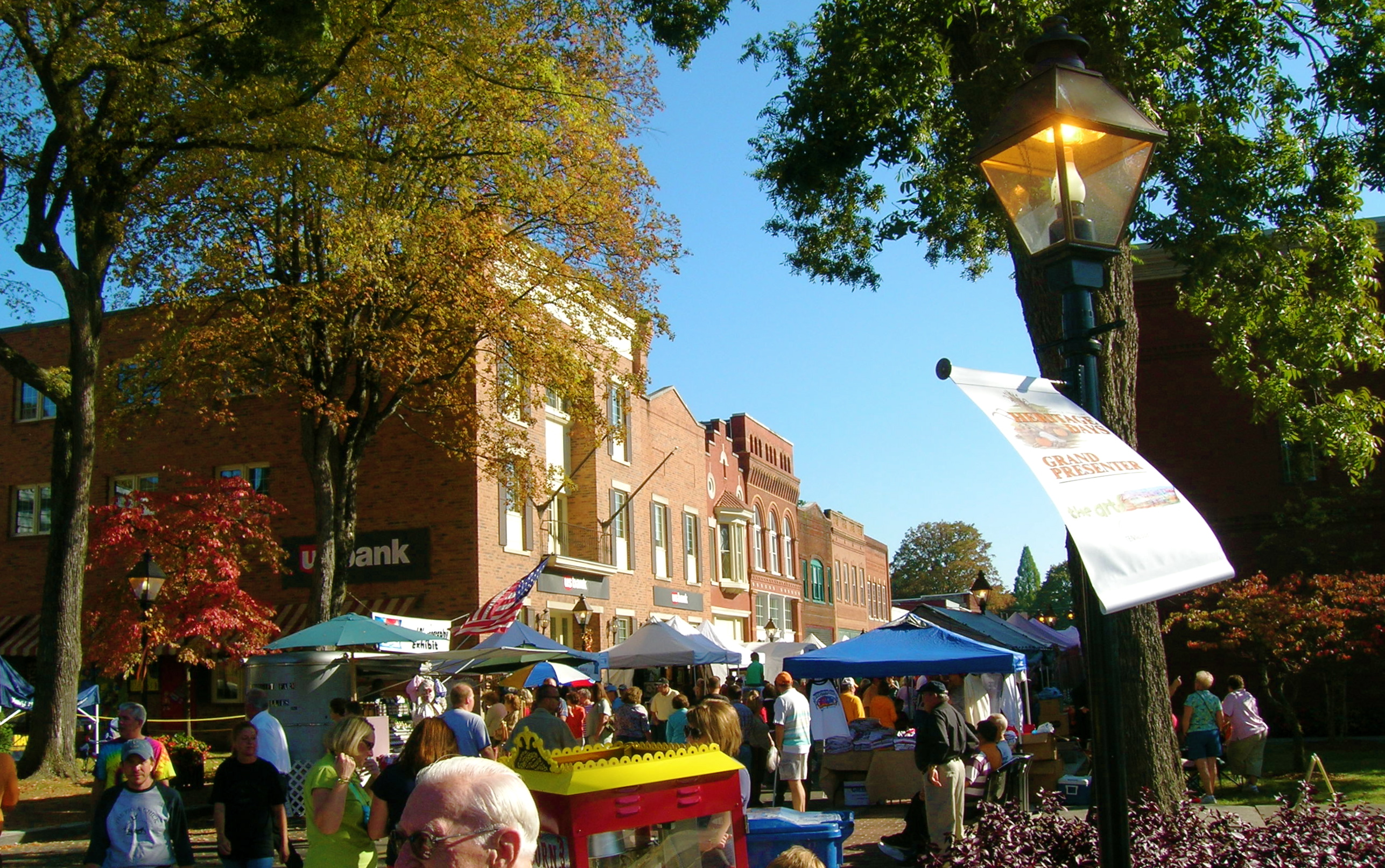
- Looking east on Main Street

- Location within Tennessee Location within the United States
- Location: Bounded by N. Boyd, Kyle, Clinch, and N. Bend Sts., McKinney Ave., and S. Rogen Rd., Rogersville, Tennessee
- Coordinates: 36°24′26″N 83°0′19″W
- Built: 1786
- Architectural style: Mid 19th Century Revival, Greek Revival, Late Victorian
- NRHP reference No.: 73001787
- Added to NRHP: February 23, 1973

The Rogersville Historic District is a historic district in Rogersville, Tennessee, the county seat of Hawkins County. It is both a local historic district and a National Register of Historic Places historic district.

The local historic district established by the Town of Rogersville to safeguard, preserve, and protect hundreds of unique and historically significant structures in and around the town's downtown area. It comprises numerous neighborhoods and business areas, with architecture and significant historical events occurring throughout the history of the town, since its settlement by Davy Crockett's grandparents in 1775.

The street plan of the core of the district, which centers on Rogersville's commercial and governmental hub, was designed by the town's founder, Joseph Rogers, when he petitioned the North Carolina General Assembly to establish a town at Hawkins Court House in 1786.

The local historic district is administered by the Town of Rogersville's Historic Preservation Commission, a governmental body. It includes numerous historically significant structures, including:

- Hale Springs Inn, c. 1824
- Hawkins County Courthouse, c. 1836
- Overton Lodge, c. 1840

The entire Rogersville Historic District is listed on the National Register of Historic Places.
