= Hawkins County Courthouse =

Coordinates: 36.4065°N 83.0063°W

- U.S. Historic district – Contributing property
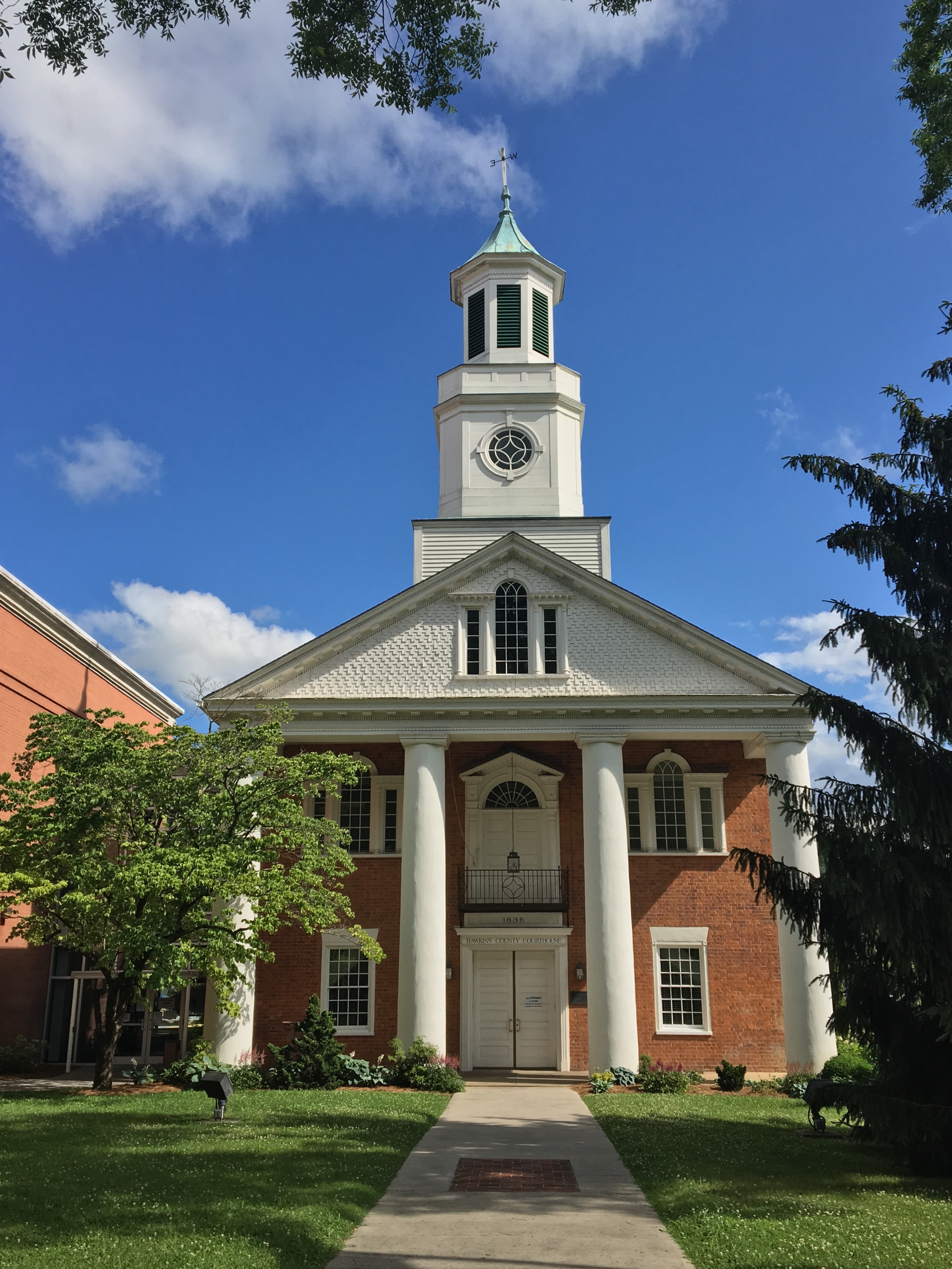
- The courthouse is located within the Rogersville Historic District

- Location within Tennessee
- Interactive map showing the location of Hawkins County Courthouse
- Location: 100 East Main Street; Rogersville, Tennessee; United States
- Built: 1836
- Architect: John Dameron
- Architectural style: Federal, with neoclassical influence
- Part of: Rogersville Historic District (ID73001787)
- Designated CP: February 23, 1973

The Hawkins County Courthouse is the seat of county government for Hawkins County, Tennessee, United States, located in the city of Rogersville. It was built in 1836, it is one of six antebellum courthouses still in use in Tennessee, and it is the second oldest courthouse still in use in the state.

== History ==
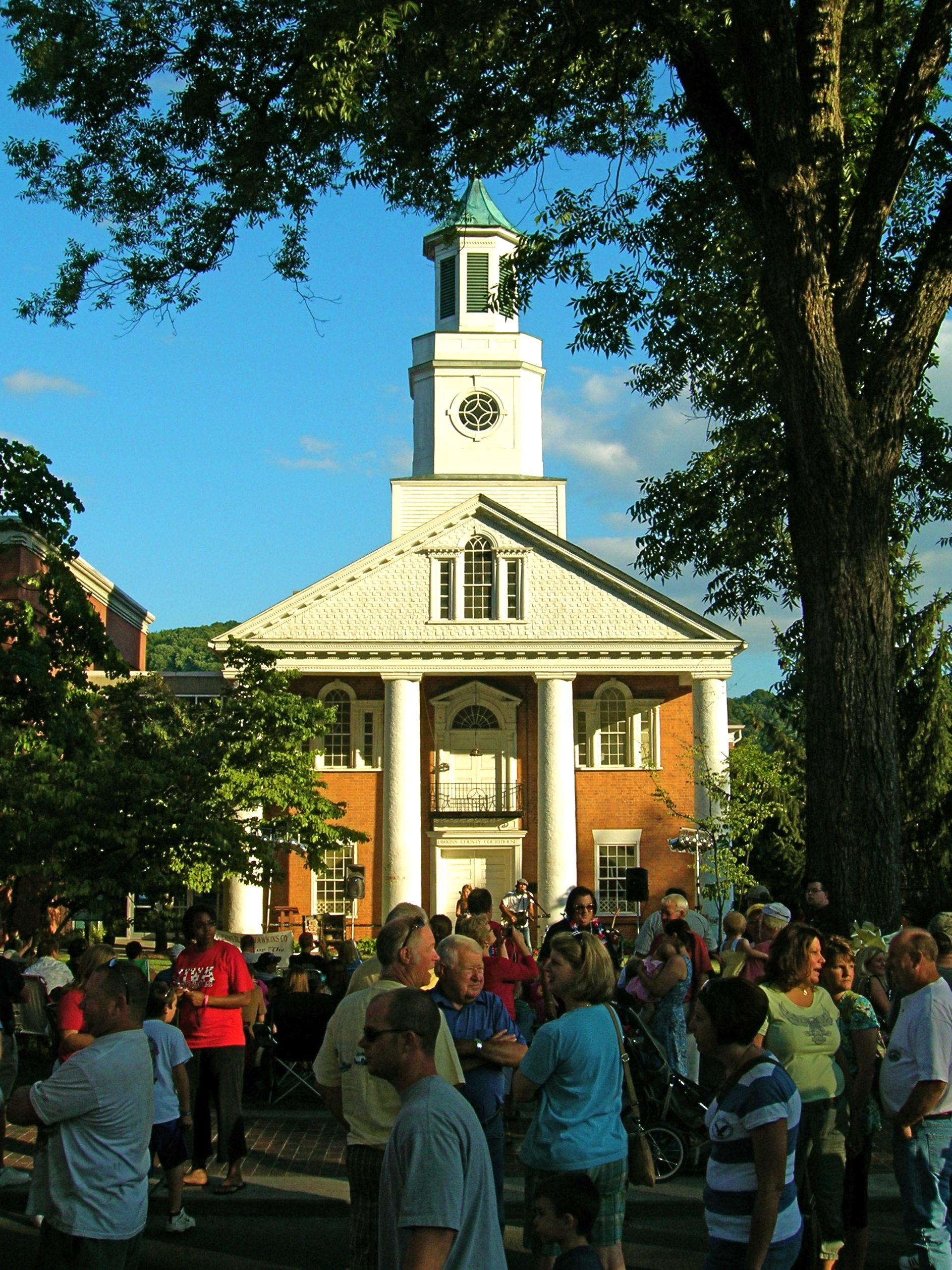
The courthouse in July 2009.

=== County seat ===
Hawkins County was organized in 1786 by the State of North Carolina; Rogersville, then called Hawkins Courthouse, was selected as the county seat due to the diligence of its founder and tireless promoter, Joseph Rogers (son-in-law to a prominent local settler, Colonel Thomas Amis, a French Huguenot who worked with the Irish-born Rogers after Rogers wedded Amis' daughter Mary).

The seat of county government was established in the back of Rogers' first tavern, a log structure that boasted an attached lean-to with jail-stocks. In 1796, when Tennessee attained statehood, it was in this log structure that the vote was tallied and proclaimed. In 1810, the State set up a circuit court for Hawkins County, prompting the county justices to build a newer, larger log-and-clapboard structure on what had become Rogersville's Main Street (which corresponded to the Great Stage Road connecting Washington, D.C., with Knoxville and the Cumberland Gap to Kentucky). Chancery Court was first held in this building in 1825.

=== Third courthouse ===
By 1835, the county, now having three towns (Rogersville, Bulls Gap, and Surgoinsville), had outgrown its second, log-based courthouse, and the county set out to buy land and build a courthouse commensurate with growing Rogersville's new architectural prominence (as detailed below). The lot upon which the courthouse now stands was purchased from Louisiana Rogers Mitchell, daughter of town founder Joseph Rogers, who had bequeathed it to her in his will after his death in 1833. In 1836, the Mitchells sold the lot to the Justices of the Court of Common Pleas and Quarter Sessions of Hawkins County for $500. The justices planned to follow the patterns established in nearby Virginia and North Carolina in constructing their courthouse, and in 1836, they engaged John Dameron, the most prominent architect in the region, to draw up the plans for the new building.

=== Architect ===
The justices' choice of Dameron was in keeping with the architect's prior experience in Rogersville: he had already designed and overseen the construction of Rogersville's First Presbyterian Church (ca. 1821) in Federal style and the Hale Springs Inn (ca. 1824) in Georgian style . He would later build the Second Presbyterian Church (today's Rogersville Presbyterian Church, ca. 1840) in Greek Revival style.

Dameron received the contract to build the new structure on November 28, 1836. Over the course of the next few weeks, he chose a different style for the new courthouse than any of his previous Rogersville designs. Thomas Jefferson had drawn plans for a courthouse in Botetourt County, Virginia in 1818, and Dameron, who grew up near the Botetourt county seat of Fincastle, was familiar with Jefferson's design. Further, Dameron was familiar with Thomas Crutchfield's 1824 adaptation of Jefferson's Botetourt design (Crutchfield, too, was a native of Botetourt), the nearby Greene County Courthouse in Greeneville, Tennessee.

=== Plans for the new courthouse ===
The plan was basically an enlargement of the Botetourt design with the addition of a taller tower and a bell-shaped cupola with Georgian-style, copper finials. The Jeffersonian style chosen by Dameron combines Palladian proportions and themes with the late-Georgian neoclassicism characteristic of the early Republican period. Features included red brick construction; all-white painted columns; all-white painted trim; unfluted columns; Tuscan, Doric, Corinthian, or Ionic order capitals; portico-and-pediment primary entries; classical moldings; and square, round, octagonal, and fan-shaped windows or pediment openings.

The original Dameron design includes all the elements of Jeffersonian style: the Hawkins County Courthouse is built of red bricks laid in the Fleming bond pattern; it features all-white painted columns and trim, and unfluted Tuscan columns. Guilloche-patterned carving on the architrave of the thrice-repeated Palladian windows is also used in the roof cornice. Above a simple, double-doored main entrance is an elaborate double-door with a carved pediment adorned with dentils, fanlight and pilasters. On the first floor, twelve-over-twelve window openings are contrasted on the second floor with Palladian windows with Roman arch keystones (a motif repeated in the portico).

In the original design, a massive three-tiered tower is topped by a bell-shaped, copper cupola. The first and second tiers (which were of equal width) are cubic in shape, with large, Georgian-style painted shutters covering a false window opening. The third stage is octagonal, with Palladian-shaped, closed, Georgian-style painted shutters covering false openings. At the bottom of the cupola, the guilloche-patterned cornice molding was repeated with the octagonal bell cupola surmounted by a lightning-rod spire with a large, copper ball finial. Further Georgian influence can be detected in the original design's twin chimneys, which featured cornice-like molding that matched the dentils elsewhere on the structure. Inside the tower, in the third tier below the cupola, a large copper bell was used to call citizens to the courthouse for public functions (only 25 years later, in 1862, the bell was donated to the Confederacy, and shipped to Georgia to be melted down).

=== 1870 renovations ===
The design was executed largely according to Dameron's plans, and remained intact for 33 years. In 1870, the main stairways, which Dameron had included inside the structure, were moved to the exterior in order to allow for greater room inside the main, second-floor courtroom. The structure then remain unchanged, except for the installation of a new bell and various maintenance updates, until 1929. In that year, the County Court authorized $42,000 for a new addition to the south end of the courthouse, and an updating of the rest of the building.

=== 1929 additions ===
As a part of the 1929 renovations, Dameron's original bell-shaped cupola and its second and third tower-tiers were removed. Using his tower's first tier as a base, the new design added two octagonal tiers, neither of which were as wide as the original Dameron first tier. The new second tier was approximately the same height as Dameron's old second tier, but instead of the Jeffersonian-inspired Georgian closed shutters, a traceried lunette was added on four sides of the octagonal tier. The lunette did, however, utilize the Roman-arch keystone motif from Dameron's Palladian windows to connect the new with the old. The new third tier was only about a fourth of the height of the new second tier, and it served primarily as a base for the most dramatic change in the tower: the addition of an octagonal, shuttered belfry. The new element was designed to the make the overall height of the tower greater. Surmounting the belfry was a New England–style octagonal, copper spire that was topped by a spear-shaped copper finial and simple weathervane. Both the new belfry and the new spire included Dameron's guilloche-patterned carving. In addition, the 1929 renovations saw the balcony which had been constructed in 1870 when the staircases had been moved to the exterior portico restored to the central, second-floor doorway, and the stairs were moved back into the interior.

=== 2000 annex ===
Following the 1929 renovations, no major changes occurred to the courthouse for 72 years. In 2000, the Hawkins County government, faced with burgeoning Kingsport suburbs in its eastern sections, had once again outgrown its courthouse. To accommodate the growth, the Hawkins County Commission (successor to the 1836 justices and 1929 County Court) purchased, remodeled, and restored the Mitchell Building (located just to the east of the Courthouse and built 1841) to serve as an annex to the courthouse for more courtrooms and for county office and archive space. As a part of these renovations, the exterior eastern wall of the courthouse was breached on its first and second floors in order to accommodate a glass-enclosed breezeway designed to connect the two buildings and provide elevator access for the courthouse's second floor (via an elevator in the Mitchell Building).

=== Current use ===
The tower of the courthouse stands above downtown Rogersville at sunset.

Today, the Hawkins County Courthouse and its annex remain the home of all county courts and county offices, except for the jail, Sheriff's Department, and County Mayor's office. County government is still carried on here each month when the County Commission meets in the second-floor courtroom. The Hawkins County Courthouse, having continuously served as the seat of county government since 1836, is the second oldest courthouse in Tennessee still used for that purpose.

Today the courthouse houses the General Sessions, Circuit, and Chancery Courts of Hawkins County; hosts numerous administrative county offices; and serves as the meeting place for the county legislative body, the Hawkins County Board of Commissioners.

== National Register of Historic Places ==
The courthouse is not listed as an entry on the U.S. National Register of Historic Places (though the Rogersville Main Street program is working with the Hawkins County Mayor's Office to have it added), but it is a contributing property of the Rogersville Historic District. As such, it is an historically significant part of the reason that the district was itself included on the National Register.
