= Hale Springs Inn =

- U.S. Historic district – Contributing property
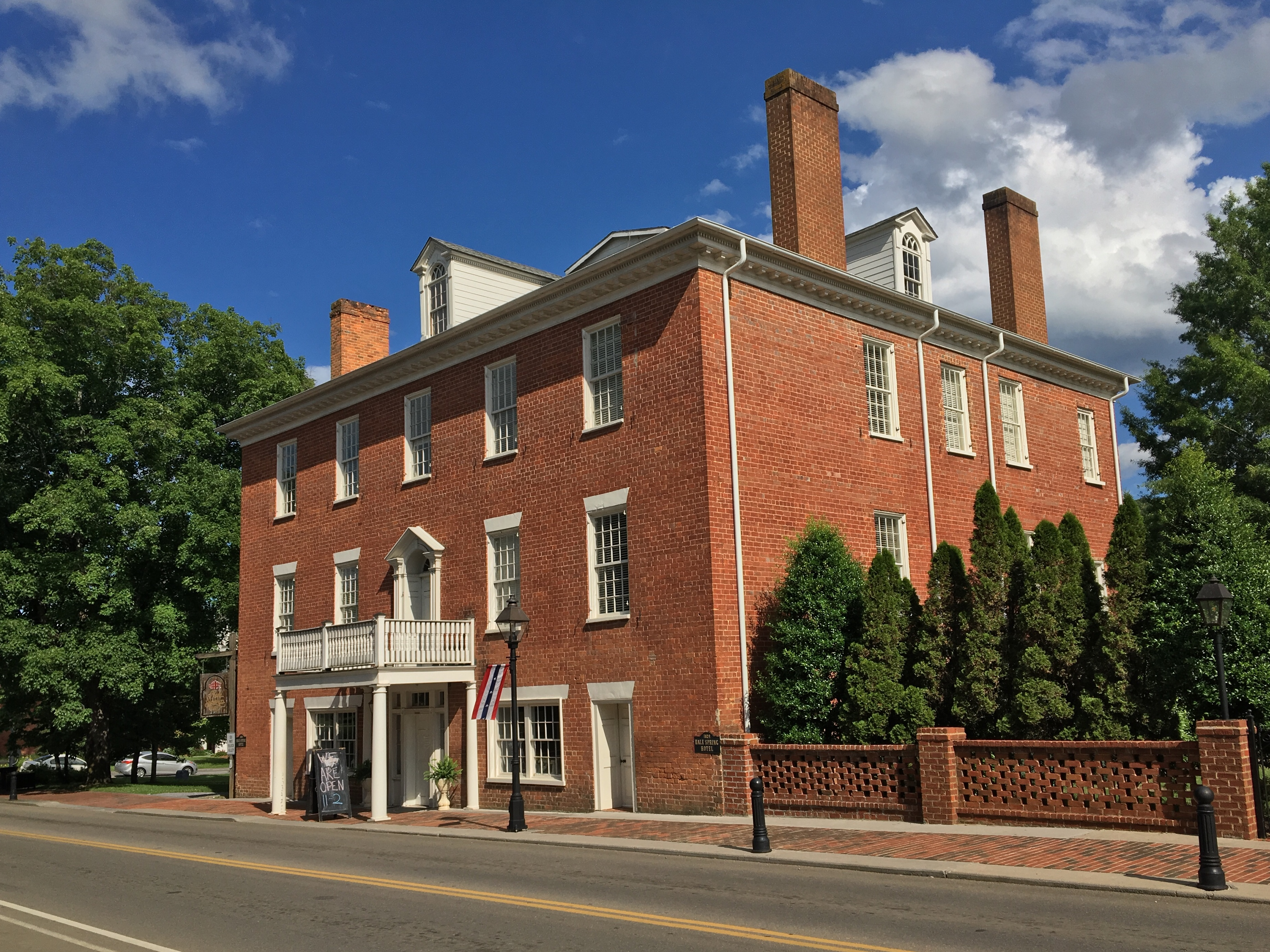
- The Hale Springs Inn is located within the Rogersville Historic District
- Location: 110 West Main Street, Rogersville, Tennessee
- Nearest city: Rogersville, Tennessee
- Coordinates: 36.407003°N 83.006583°W
- Built: 1824
- Architectural style: Federal
- Part of: Rogersville Historic District (ID73001787)
- Designated CP: February 23, 1973

Hale Springs Inn, built in 1824 on the Courthouse Square in Rogersville, Tennessee, was the oldest continuously-operated inn in Tennessee. It is listed as a contributing property of the Rogersville Historic District.

== Early history ==
The Inn was originally built in 1824-25 by John McKinney, a local lawyer and businessman, to compete with the tavern operated by the founder of Rogersville, Joseph Rogers.

Rogers' Tavern was originally located a few hundred feet off the Great Stage Road that ran through the new town to Knoxville, Tennessee, toward the Cumberland Gap. In 1815, Rogers built a newer building directly on the Stage Road. However, neither building was very substantial, and there were minimal guest rooms.

McKinney's plan was to build a larger, brick inn directly on the road to compete with both of Rogers' buildings. In 1823, he began construction on a massive, three-story Federal-style building that would house facilities for a true tavern bar, but also individual guest rooms on the different floors. The building also featured an impressive balcony over its door that would feature prominently later in its history.

== Distinguished guests ==
During the nineteenth century, Hale Springs Inn played host to many famous personages as they made their way into the thriving new state of Tennessee. Among them were United States Presidents Andrew Jackson, James K. Polk, and Andrew Johnson.

Jackson stayed at the inn shortly after its completion while he was still President, and he used its balcony to address a crowd of Rogersvillians in a political speech. McKinney, the inn's owner, saw this as a publicity coup over rival and town-founder, Joseph Rogers, who had also petitioned the President to stay at his tavern. The deciding factor in Jackson's mind, according to letters from the time, was the balcony over the Inn's main door.

== American Civil War period ==
During the American Civil War, East Tennessee and her citizens were deeply divided over the issues of slavery, States' rights, and secession that ultimately led to Tennessee's secession from the Union.

This conflict was reflected by the buildings Rogersville's occupiers chose when they controlled the town. Early in the war, Union forces captured the town and during their occupation, they set their headquarters in the Hale Springs Inn, which was on the south side of Main Street but faced north.

When the Confederacy captured Rogersville in early 1863 during the Battle of Big Creek, they established their headquarters across the street from the Hale Springs Inn, in the Kyle House, which was on the north side of Main Street but faced south.

After the civil war, the name of the inn was changed to Hale Springs Hotel, and it began to serve as a stopping point for tourists who were on their way to see nearby Hale Springs Resort, a famous hot mineral spring near Rogersville.

== Twentieth century ==
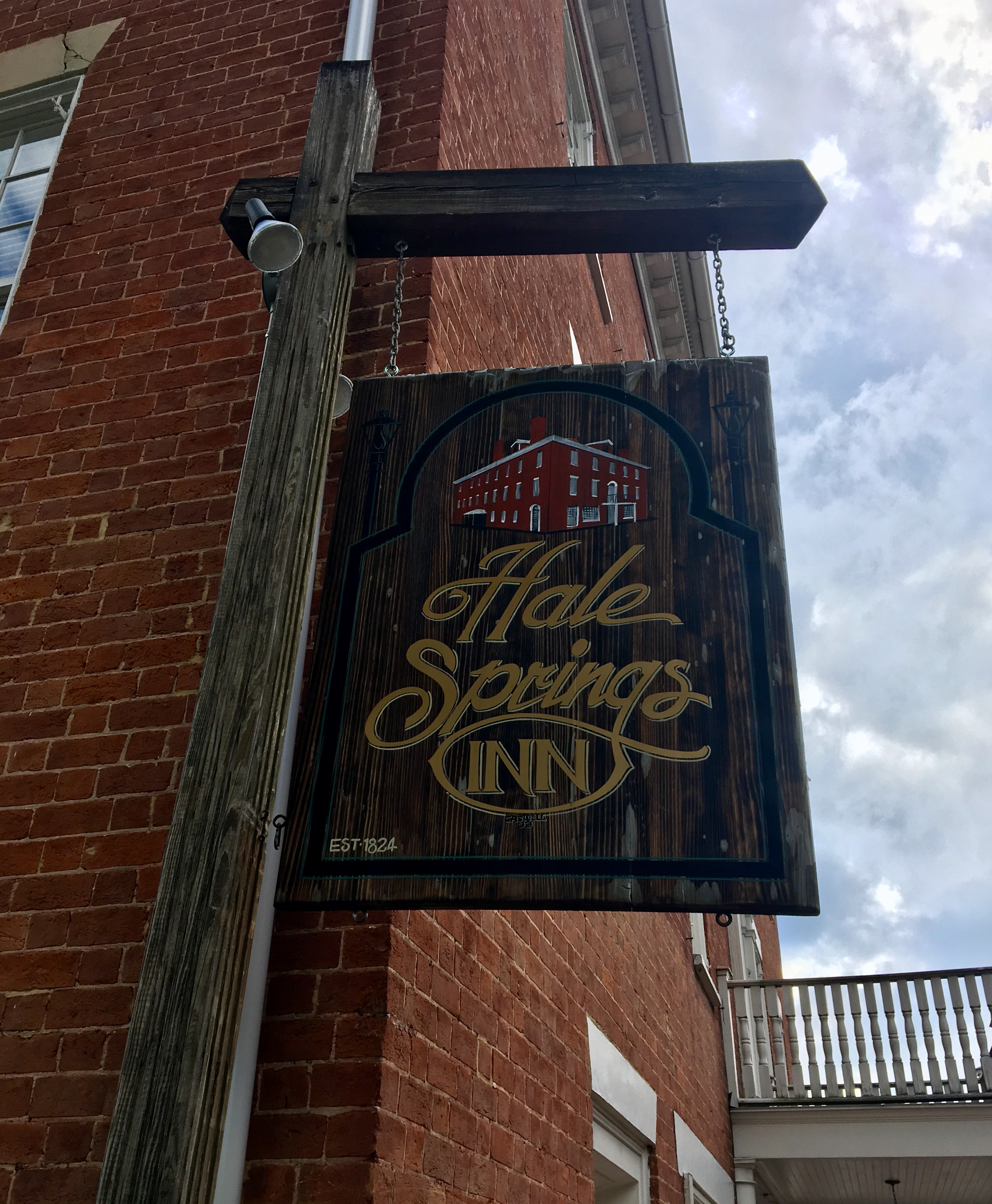
The sign for Hale Springs Inn in 2020.

The building continued to serve as a hotel until it closed briefly in 1980, when it was purchased, fully restored to its 1820-30s appearance, and reopened as Hale Springs Inn.

When the inn closed in 1998, it was Tennessee's oldest continuously operated inn. In 2003 the Rogersville Heritage Association purchased the inn and, in cooperation with city government, launched a renovation effort which surpassed US$2.1 million as of early 2009. Completion and reopening of the inn was projected for June 2009.

During the renovation, the rear addition that was built in 1870 partially fell and was demolished, leaving only the original 1824 main structure. Builders salvaged brick from the 1870 rear addition for use on the exterior of the new rear addition/kitchen under construction in late 2008 and early 2009.

== Recent operations ==
After its owner, Captain Carl Netherland-Brown, closed the inn in 1999, the Rogersville Heritage Association decided to purchase the Inn and continue to operate it as an inn, while discontinuing the function of its kitchen, dining area, and garden: focusing on the history of its previous inhabitants as the crown jewel of the downtown Rogersville Historic District.

The inn underwent extensive renovations through a public-private joint venture of the Town of Rogersville and the Rogersville Heritage Association. The Hale Springs Inn then re-opened in 2009 and has since operated as an inn with 9 spacious guestrooms, and it houses McKinney's Restaurant and Tavern. The restored inn is open to the public and serves lunch and dinner. The inn also serves as a rental location for weddings, reunions, and other events.

== National Register of Historic Places ==
The Hale Springs Inn is not listed as an entry on the National Register of Historic Places, but it is recognized as a contributing property of the Rogersville Historic District. As such, it is a historically significant component of the district included on the National Register.
