= Overton Lodge =

- Overton Lodge Masonic Temple
- U.S. Historic district – Contributing property
- Overton Lodge is located within Rogersville Historic District

- Location within Tennessee Location within the United States
- Location: 103 East Main Street, Rogersville, Tennessee
- Nearest city: Rogersville, Tennessee
- Coordinates: 36°24′52″N 82°59′51″W
- Built: 1840
- Architectural style: Neoclassical, with Federal influence
- Part of: Rogersville Historic District (ID73001787)
- Designated CP: February 23, 1973

Overton Lodge No. 5 is a Freemason lodge under the Grand Lodge of Tennessee. Overton Lodge is located on the Courthouse Square in Rogersville Historic District in downtown Rogersville, Tennessee in the United States.

== History ==
=== Early history and name ===
Founded December 14, 1805, Overton Lodge was, at the time of its formation, a part of the Grand Lodge of North Carolina and Tennessee.

The Lodge was named in honor of John Overton, 1766-1833, by John Williams. Overton was a prominent Tennessee jurist and Freemason, who practiced law with another young lawyer and Freemason, Andrew Jackson.

On my way to this place the gentlemen of Rogersville requested me to procure from the Grand Lodge of No Caro: a dispensation for a masonic lodge at that place. Upon applying for the dispensation the officers of the Grand Lodge granted it and required that a name should be given the lodge. The gentlemen of Rogersville furnished me with no name for the lodge and I therefore I took the liberty of naming the lodge after you which was highly approved by the officers of the Grand Lodge. I hope _____ it will not be disagreeable to you.

— Williams to Overton, November 24, 1805, Overton Papers, Tennessee State Archives

Overton was appointed by Tennessee governor John Sevier to succeed Jackson, in 1804, as the judge of the superior court in Nashville. He held this post until 1810, and in 1811 was elected a justice of the Supreme Court of Tennessee, which office he filled till his resignation in 1816. During this period he wrote "Overton's Reports," which include the time from 1791 to 1817, and are of great value as a repository of the land laws of Tennessee.

When the eight lodges in Tennessee came together to form the new Grand Lodge of Tennessee in Knoxville on December 27, 1813, Overton Lodge sent representatives to the convention that established the new grand lodge, and as such, it is one of Tennessee's founding lodges.

=== Acquiring a home ===
It is unclear where Overton Lodge met in the first years of its existence, but it is plain that they eventually acquired the former Branch Office of the Bank of Tennessee, located on the Courthouse Square in downtown Rogersville. This building, circa 1840, is an example of Federal, neoclassical architecture that dominates the Historic District of Rogersville.

=== During the Civil War ===
Overton Lodge was one of the few Lodges in the State to remain active during each year of the American Civil War, and it is by virtue of this distinction that Overton may claim to be the oldest, continuously-operated lodge in the State: all four of the older Lodges, including the currently extant Greeneville Lodge No. 3, had their charters revoked or have since gone defunct.

=== Bicentennial year ===
In 2005, Overton Lodge celebrated its two-hundredth year of Freemasonry in the heart of Rogersville. The Lodge recognized the achievements of its forebears, and offered special commemorative memorabilia as a part of the celebration.

== National Register of Historic Places ==
The Lodge's building (the Overton Lodge Masonic Temple) is listed on the U.S. National Register of Historic Places as a contributing property in the Rogersville Historic District; as such, it is an historically-significant part of the reason that the district was itself included on the National Register.
