= Bulls Gap, Tennessee =

Bulls Gap
- Town
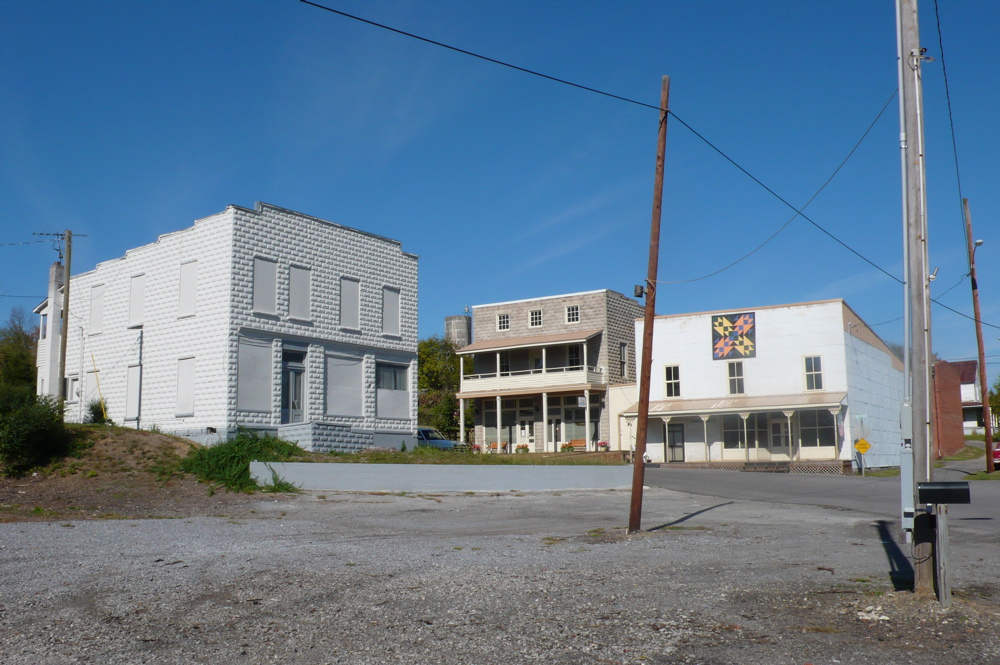
- Several buildings in the old section of Bulls Gap

- Location in Hawkins County, Tennessee

- Location within Tennessee Location within the United States
- Coordinates: 36°15′33″N 83°4′46″W
- Country: United States
- State: Tennessee
- County: Hawkins
- Settled: 1792
- Incorporated: 1955
- Named for: John Bull (early settler)

Government
  - Type: Board of Mayor and Aldermen
  - Mayor: Stacy Hayes
  - Vice Mayor: Jimmy Riley
  - Aldermen: List of Aldermen: Jimmy Sexton; Vice Mayor Charles Johnson; Martha Snelson; Susan Williams

Area
  - Total: 1.22 sq mi (3.16 km^{2})
  - Land: 1.22 sq mi (3.16 km^{2})
  - Water: 0 sq mi (0.00 km^{2})
- Elevation: 1,180 ft (360 m)

Population (2020)
  - Total: 756
  - Density: 620.6/sq mi (239.61/km^{2})
- Time zone: UTC-5 (Eastern (EST))
  - Summer (DST): UTC-4 (EDT)
- ZIP code: 37711
- Area code: 423
- FIPS code: 47-09560
- GNIS feature ID: 1269404
- Website: https://www.bullsgaptn.org/

Bulls Gap is a town in Hawkins County, Tennessee, United States. The population was 756 at the 2020 census. It is part of the Metropolitan Statistical Area, which is a component of the Johnson City-Kingsport-Bristol, TN-VA Combined Statistical Area – commonly known as the "Tri-Cities" region.

The downtown area is listed on the National Register of Historic Places as the Bulls Gap Historic District.

The town was named for the famous gunsmith, John Bull, who made his home in the gap of mountains.

== Geography ==
Bulls Gap is located at 36°15′33″N 83°4′46″W (36.259094, -83.079507).

According to the United States Census Bureau, the town has a total area of 1.2 square miles (3.1 km^{2}), all of it land.

== History ==
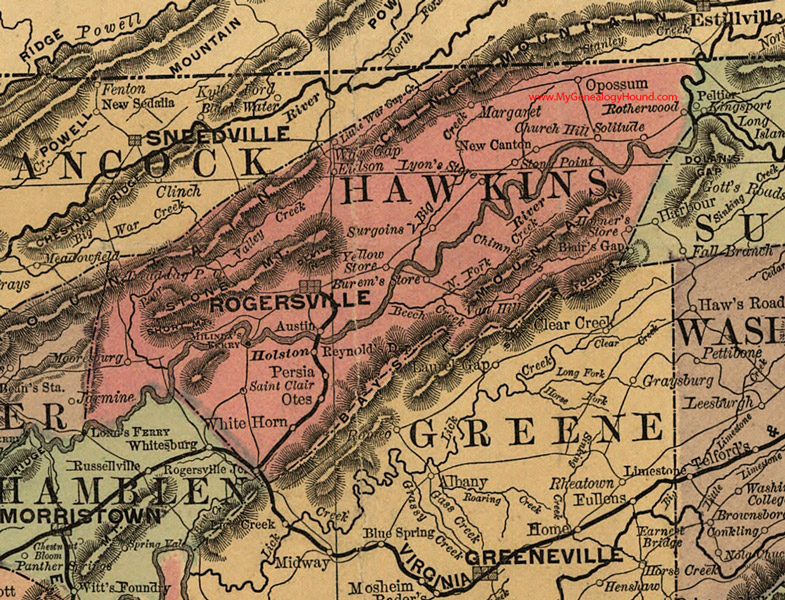
Bulls Gap after being renamed "Rogersville Junction," circa 1882

In November 1864, a small Civil War battle was fought here. The Battle of Bull's Gap was a Confederate victory, with John C. Breckinridge the victorious general.

== Demographics ==
Historical population
Census	Pop.	Note	%±
1960	682		—
1970	774		13.5%
1980	821		6.1%
1990	659		−19.7%
2000	714		8.3%
2010	738		3.4%
2020	756		2.4%

=== 2020 census ===
Bulls Gap racial composition
Race	Number	Percentage
White (non-Hispanic)	705	93.25%
Black or African American (non-Hispanic)	3	0.4%
Asian	2	0.26%
Other/Mixed	35	4.63%
Hispanic or Latino	11	1.46%

As of the 2020 United States census, there were 756 people, 352 households, and 222 families residing in the town.

=== 2000 census ===
As of the census of 2000, there were 714 people, 319 households, and 210 families residing in the town. The population density was 570.6 inhabitants per square mile (220.3/km^{2}). There were 348 housing units at an average density of 278.1 per square mile (107.4/km^{2}). The racial makeup of the town was 99.02% White, 0.70% African American, and 0.28% from two or more races.

There were 319 households, out of which 27.9% had children under the age of 18 living with them, 49.8% were married couples living together, 13.8% had a female householder with no husband present, and 33.9% were non-families. 30.7% of all households were made up of individuals, and 16.3% had someone living alone who was 65 years of age or older. The average household size was 2.24 and the average family size was 2.81.

In the town, the population was spread out, with 22.5% under the age of 18, 6.4% from 18 to 24, 24.9% from 25 to 44, 28.4% from 45 to 64, and 17.6% who were 65 years of age or older. The median age was 42 years. For every 100 females, there were 85.0 males. For every 100 females age 18 and over, there were 76.1 males.

The median income for a household in the town was $25,074, and the median income for a family was $28,917. Males had a median income of $29,306 versus $21,500 for females. The per capita income for the town was $14,822. About 23.9% of families and 22.2% of the population were below the poverty line, including 31.9% of those under age 18 and 17.1% of those age 65 or over.

== Notable people ==
Legendary country comedian Archie Campbell, who regularly performed at the Grand Ole Opry and starred in the television show Hee Haw, was a native of Bulls Gap. Campbell referred to the town in many of his classic comedy routines. His house has been preserved as a museum and tourist attraction, and U.S. Route 11E through Bulls Gap was renamed "Archie Campbell Highway" following his death in 1987. Every Labor Day weekend the town has an annual three-day celebration honoring Campbell with a car show, food and live music.

American Southern Gospel Singer Kirk Talley grew up in Bulls Gap

New York Times best selling author Amy Greene grew up in the vicinity of Bulls Gap.

== References in popular culture ==
In Cormac McCarthy's novel Child of God, Lester Ballard murders a young couple in their car, gets in the car, turns on the radio, and listens to the radio host talk about an upcoming event at Bulls Gap School.

George Washington Harris' short story, "Sut Lovingood at Bull's Gap," is set in Bulls Gap.

== Sports ==
Bulls Gap is home to Volunteer Speedway, a dirt racetrack, that is billed as the "World's Fastest Dirt Track."

== Education ==
Schools serving Bulls Gap are a part of the Hawkins County School District, they include:

- Bulls Gap School – Grades K-8
- Cherokee Comprehensive High School – Grades 9-12

== Postal service ==
Bulls Gap has a Post Office located on US Route 11E, with the ZIP Code 37711. It serves portions of Greene, Hawkins and Hamblen counties.
