= Fudge Farm =

Historic house in Tennessee, United States

- U.S. National Register of Historic Places
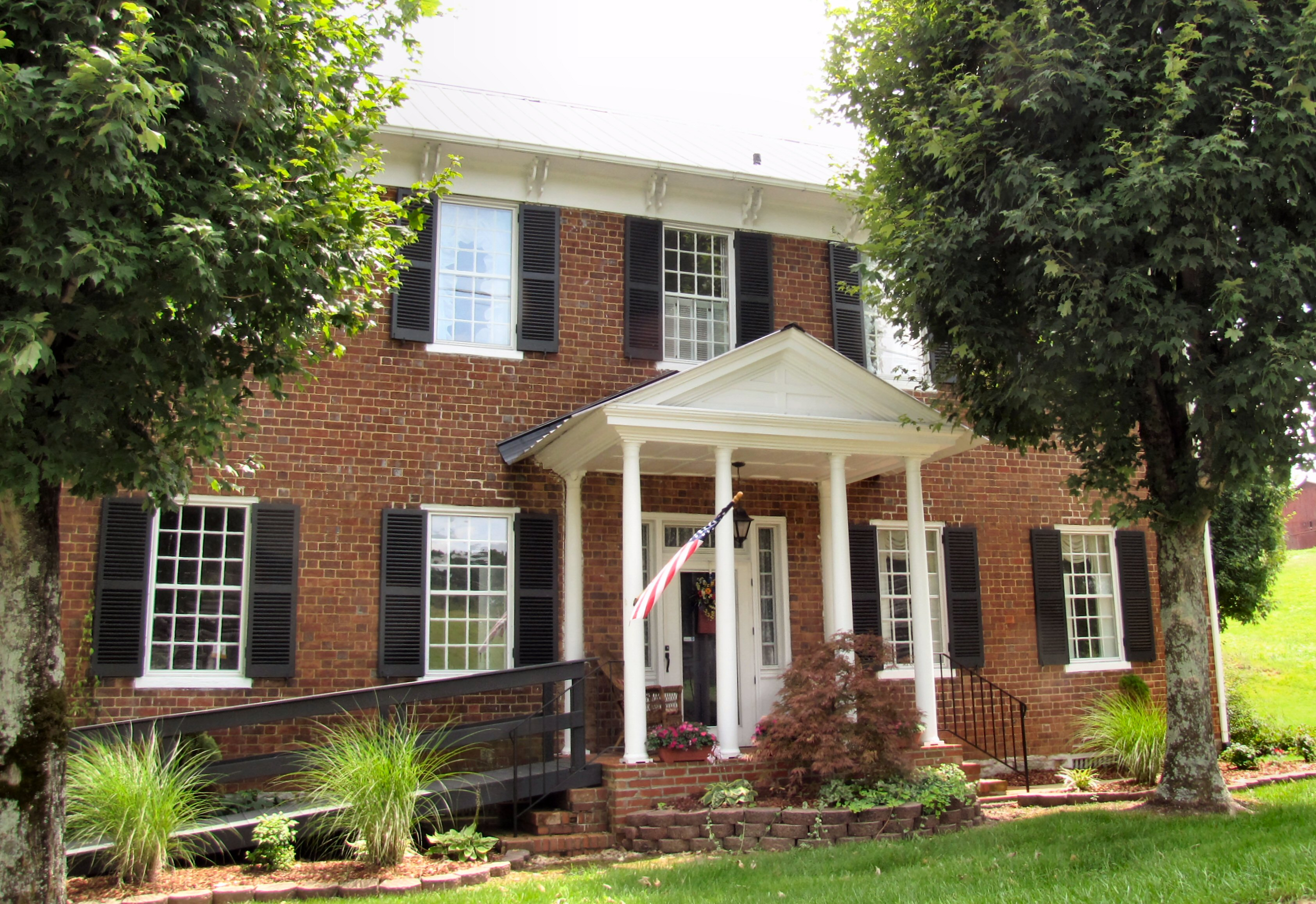

- Location within Tennessee Location within the United States
- Nearest city: Surgoinsville, Tennessee
- Coordinates: 36°29′11″N 82°49′36″W
- Area: 7 acres (2.8 ha)
- Built: 1812
- NRHP reference No.: 76001783
- Added to NRHP: December 12, 1976

Fudge Farm is a historical farmhouse and property located just east of Surgoinsville, Tennessee, United States. An I-house, it was completed around 1851 and was built by slave labor for local planter Conrad Fudge, who had recently moved to the area from Virginia. Fudge Farm is still in use and privately owned. Aside from the house, the property also has a stock barn, a granary, smokehouse and a well house.
