= Yancey's Tavern =

- U.S. National Register of Historic Places
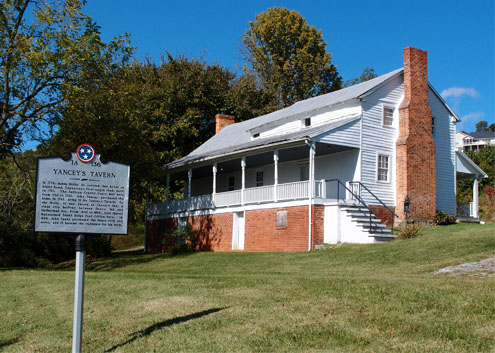
- Location: E of Kingsport on TN 126
- Nearest city: Kingsport, Tennessee
- Coordinates: 36.54859°N 82.45865°W
- NRHP reference No.: 73001850
- Added to NRHP: April 11, 1973

Yancey's Tavern is a historic structure located in Sullivan County, Tennessee on Island Road, the first wagon road in the state (1761). The building was added to the National Register of Historic Places in 1973.

== History ==
In 1779, James Hollis Sr. (1727–1794) erected the house where the second meeting of the Sullivan County Commissioners was conducted. The County Commissioners continued meeting there and at other houses until the land for the county seat in Blountville was donated in 1792.

In 1784, John Yancey, a tavern owner from Abingdon, Virginia, purchased the Hollis house and converted the structure to Yancey's Tavern. The tavern continued to operate well into the nineteenth century.

By the 1840s, ownership of the structure had passed to John Shaver. Operated as Shaver's Inn, the site served as a regular stagecoach stop on the route from Abingdon due to its location between Old Deery Inn in Blountville and Netherland Inn in Kingsport. Shaver's Inn is located approximately ten miles (16 kilometers) from both Old Deery Inn and Netherland Inn. The location was convenient since horses were normally changed after ten miles (16 kilometers) and drivers after twenty miles (32 kilometers). From 1842 to 1866, the building also served as the Eden's Ridge post office which had previously been located at the Exchange Place.

In 1889, John Spahr of Southwest Virginia bought the house and 230 acres (0.93 km^{2}) from the Shaver family. In 1903, the existing barn was erected. The Spahr Farm continued operation until the early 1950s when East Lawn Cemetery was founded. Most of the former farm area is now occupied by the cemetery. The last occupant of the house was John Spahr's daughter, Mary. After her death in 1962, the house remained vacant for 42 years. Minimal maintenance of the structure was performed during the occupancy of Mary Spahr or the subsequent ownership by her heirs and nieces, Dorothy and Ruth Wexler.

Upon the death of Ruth Wexler, an estate auction was held in 2004. The house was purchased and restored by Rann Vaulx. The barn was purchased and repaired by G. A. Agett. In 2006, Vaulx purchased the barn from Agett.

== Architectural details ==
During the Shaver ownership, the original hewn logs were covered with poplar siding. The hewn and pegged rafters remain visible, however. The interior walls were also modified during the Shaver era. The walls of the east upstairs room received poplar plank panelling while the lower floor walls utilized laths and plaster. It is believed that the fireplace mantels also date from this period. The original plank doors with wrought iron strap hinges remain unmodified. After the purchase by John Spahr, the only major change to the house was the addition of a dining room connecting the previously separated kitchen to the remainder of the structure.

The hewn timbers of the barn stand on a cut stone foundation. Marked with Roman numerals and joined with wooden pegs, the timbers of the barn appear to have come from an earlier barn.

== Current utilization ==
Yancey's Tavern was added to the National Register of Historic Places in 1973.

From 2004 to 2006, Rann Vaulx restored the site for the citizens of Sullivan County and Tennessee. The house was furnished with reproductions of furniture from the late eighteenth century. A cupboard, blanket chest, and dining room table from the early nineteenth century are also presently displayed. A ledger detailing the materials and costs of the barn construction was maintained by John Spahr and is exhibited today.

During restoration, a fragment of quilt was found behind a wall in Yancey's Tavern. It is believed that the quilt was made by the wife of John Spahr or his daughter Mary Spahr. The fragment has been framed and placed on display. A painted quilt square, Grandmother's Flower Garden, was inspired by the fragment and hangs on the side of the barn.

The tavern is currently shown by appointment and is also available for use by church groups or groups dedicated to historic preservation, patriotism, or genealogy.

On April 26, 2014, the Northeast Tennessee Mustang Club made a stop at the tavern during their "Island Road Run" cruise to celebrate the 50th anniversary of the Ford Mustang. There were 21 cars in attendance for the cruise and were parked along the front of the tavern.

== See also ==
- List of the oldest buildings in Tennessee
