= Amis House (Rogersville, Tennessee) =

- U.S. National Register of Historic Places
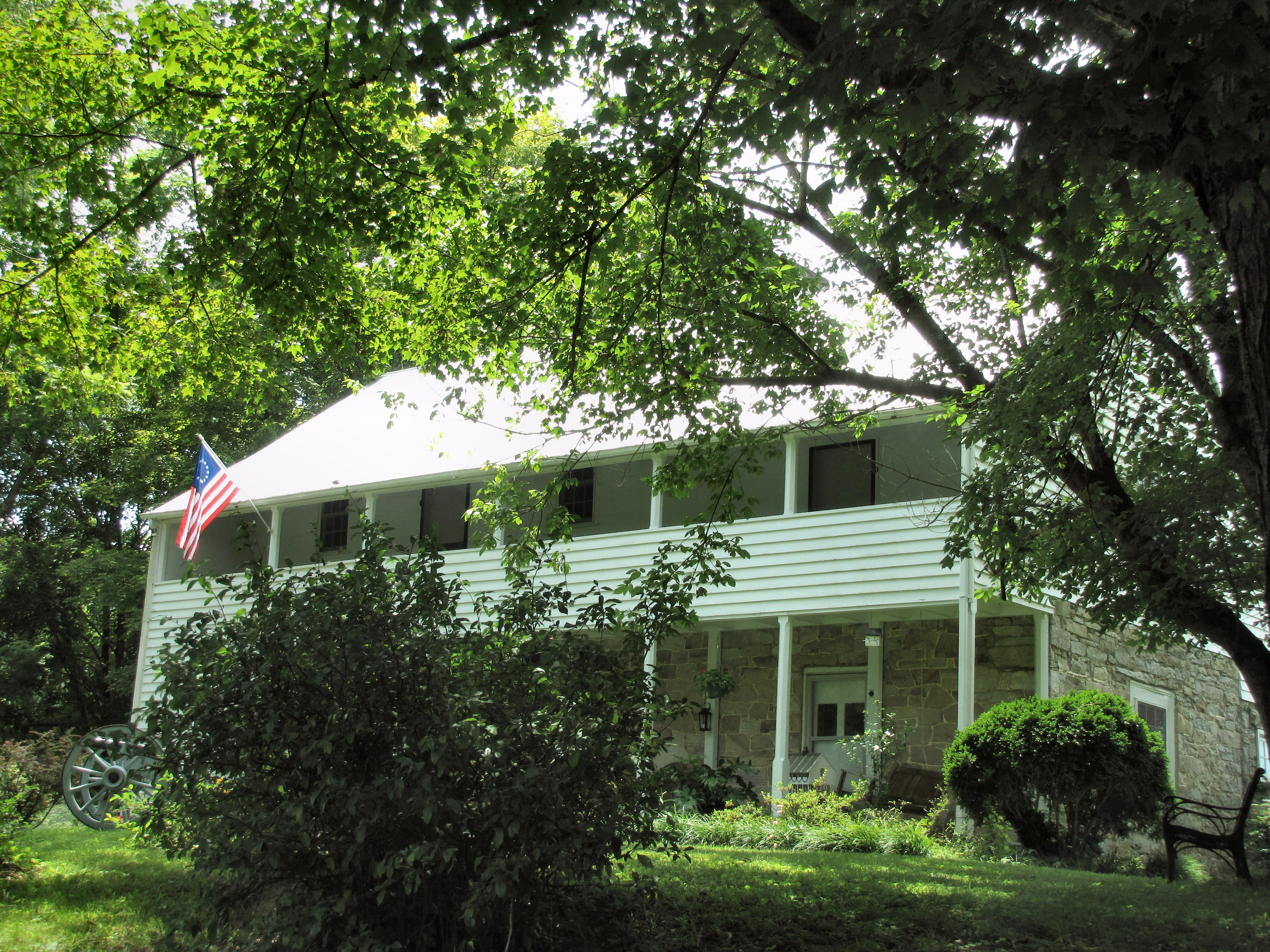

- Location within Tennessee Location within the United States
- Location: Burem Road (127 W Bear Hollow Road), Rogersville, Tennessee
- Coordinates: 36°25′10″N 82°57′21″W
- Area: 8 acres (3.2 ha)
- Built: 1782
- Architect: Thomas Harlan
- NRHP reference No.: 73001786
- Added to NRHP: June 19, 1973

Amis House is a pioneer settlement in Hawkins County, Tennessee near Rogersville, built in 1780–2 by Thomas Amis, the father-in-law of Rogersville founder Joseph Rogers.

In addition to his stone house, which also served as an inn for travelers, Amis established a tavern, general store, distillery, saw mill, and grist mill. The property was surrounded by a palisade for protection from possible attack by Native Americans.

The Amis House property was listed on the National Register of Historic Places in 1973. Ownership of Amis House has remained in the Amis family. Current owners are Jake and Wendy Jacobs; Wendy is a descendant of Thomas Amis. Tours of the home and grounds are offered.

== See also ==
- List of the oldest buildings in Tennessee
