= Hawkins County, Tennessee =

County in Tennessee, United States

- County
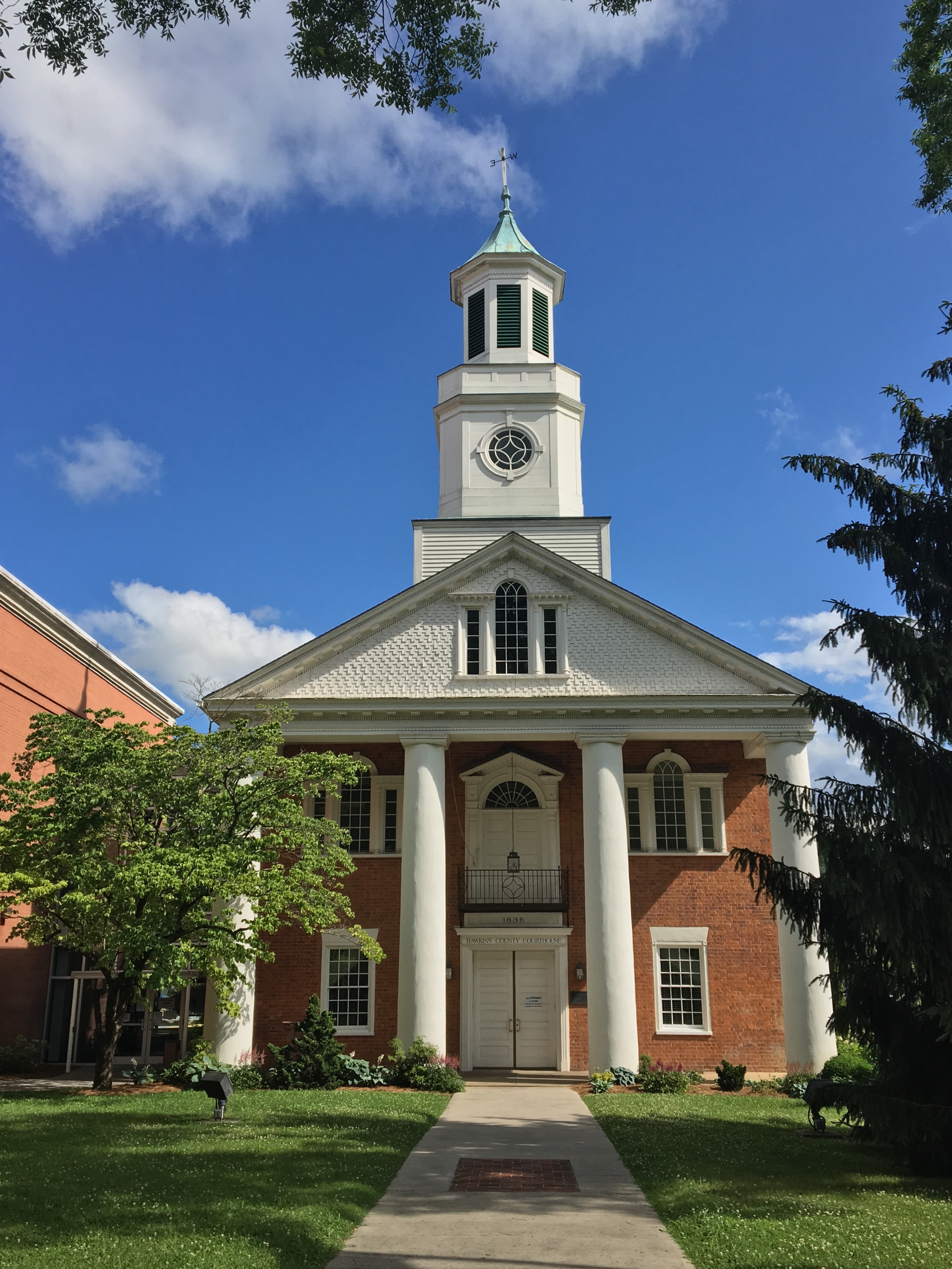
- The Hawkins County Courthouse in Rogersville, built c. 1836, is the oldest courthouse in Tennessee

- Flag Seal

- Location within the U.S. state of Tennessee
- Coordinates: 36°26′N 82°57′W
- Country: United States
- State: Tennessee
- Founded: 1787
- Named for: Benjamin Hawkins
- Seat: Rogersville
- Largest city: Church Hill

Area
  - Total: 500 sq mi (1,300 km^{2})
  - Land: 487 sq mi (1,260 km^{2})
  - Water: 13 sq mi (34 km^{2}) 2.5%

Population (2020)
  - Total: 56,721
  - Estimate (2025): 59,559 ▲
  - Density: 117/sq mi (45/km^{2})
- Time zone: UTC−5 (Eastern)
  - Summer (DST): UTC−4 (EDT)
- Congressional district: 1st
- Website: www.hawkinscountytn.gov

Hawkins County is a county located in the U.S. state of Tennessee. As of the 2020 census, the population was 56,721. Its county seat is Rogersville. Hawkins County is part of the Metropolitan Statistical Area, which is a component of the Johnson City–Kingsport–Bristol, TN–VA Combined Statistical Area, commonly known as the "Tri-Cities" region.

== History ==
The land was given to William Armstrong as a land grant in the 1780s. Armstrong built Stony Point. Armstrong's landholding was established as a county in 1787. It was named for Benjamin Hawkins, a U.S. Senator from North Carolina, the state which it was a part of at that time. In 1797, Louis Philippe (who would become King of the French in 1830) visited Armstrong's estate.

During the American Civil War, Hawkins County saw combat. The Battle of Rogersville took place on November 6, 1863.

Since the 1940s, a 1,900-2,200 acre area western Hawkins County was proposed and planned as state park to be known as Poor Valley State Park in order to promote economic development efforts in the upper East Tennessee region, the plan would stall in the 1970s.

== Law and government ==
The flag of Hawkins County, in front of the county courthouse.

Hawkins County is governed by a 14-member County Commission, whose members are elected from geographic districts. The chief executive officer of the county is the County Mayor.

=== Executive Branch ===
The Tennessee Constitution provides for the election of an executive officer – now referred to as the County Mayor – in each county. The County Mayor is elected by popular vote at the regular August election every four years, coinciding with the Governor's election, and may serve an unlimited number of terms. The County Mayor (formerly County Executive) is chief executive officer of the county. The County Mayor exercises a role of leadership in county government and is responsible for the county's fiscal management and other executive functions; however, the other principal officers of the county such as the Sheriff, Trustee, Assessor and most of the various Court Clerks are separately elected, responsible directly to the county's voters, and not under the direct supervision of the county mayor.

The County Mayor is the general agent of the county and may draw warrants upon the General Fund. The County Mayor has custody of county property not placed with other officers, and may also examine the accounts of county officers. The County Mayor is a nonvoting ex-officio member of the County Commission and of all its committees, and may be elected chairman of the county legislative body (a post that the County Mayor is not required to seek or accept). The County Mayor may call special meetings of the County Commission. Unless an optional general law or private act provides otherwise, the County Mayor compiles a budget for all county departments, offices, and agencies, which is presented to the County Commission.

The current mayor of Hawkins County is Mark DeWitte (R-Rogersville).

=== Legislative Branch ===
==== Composition ====
The Hawkins County Board of Commissioners, also called the County Commission, is the legislative body of the County government and the primary policy-making body in the county. It consists of 14 elected members, two from each of the seven civil districts of Hawkins County. Each member serves a four-year term of office.

The County Commission operates with a committee structure; most Commission business is first considered by a committee of its members before coming to the full Commission. The County Clerk serves as the Secretary to the Board of Commissioners and is responsible for maintaining all official records of the meetings.

==== Powers and responsibilities ====
The most important function of the county legislative body is the annual adoption of a budget to allocate expenditures within the three major funds of county government—general, school, and highway—and any other funds (such as debt service) that may be in existence in that particular county. The county legislative body has considerable discretion in dealing with the budget for all funds except the school budget, which in most counties must be accepted or rejected as a whole. If rejected, the school board must continue to propose alternatives until a budget is adopted by both the county school board and the county legislative body.

The county legislative body sets a property tax rate which, along with revenues from other county taxes and fees as well as state and federal monies allocated to the county, are used to fund the budget. The county legislative body is subject to various restrictions in imposing most taxes (such as referendum approval or rate limits, for example), although these do not apply to the property tax. The University of Tennessee's County Technical Assistance Service (CTAS) publishes the County Revenue Manual to assist county officials in identifying sources of county revenue.

The county legislative body serves an important role in exercising local approval authority for private acts when the private act does not call for referendum approval. Private acts, which often give additional authority to counties, must be approved by a two-thirds vote of the members of the county legislative body or be approved by a referendum in order to become effective. The form of local approval required is specified in the private act. The county legislative body annually elects a chair and a chair pro tempore.

The county legislative body may elect the county executive or a member of the body to be the chair, although the county executive may refuse to serve. The county executive may veto most resolutions of the county legislative body, subject to a vote to override by a majority of the entire county legislative body. The county executive may break a tie vote while serving as chair of the county legislative body.

Another important function of the county legislative body is its role in electing county officers when there is a vacancy in an elected county office. The person elected by the county legislative body serves in the office for the remainder of the term or until a successor is elected, depending upon when the vacancy occurred. When filling a vacancy in a county office, the county legislative body must publish a notice in a newspaper of general circulation in the county at least one week prior to the meeting in which the vote will be taken. This notice must state the time, place and date of the meeting and the office to be filled. Also, members of the county legislative body must have at least ten days notice. The legislative body holds an open election to fill the vacancy and allows all citizens the privilege of offering as candidates.

==== Current members as of 2020 ====
- District 1: Allandale, Kingsport, & Mount Carmel
  - John Gibson (Mount Carmel])
  - Syble Vaughan-Trent (Kingsport)
- District 2: Church Hill & McPheeter's Bend
  - Jeff Barrett (Church Hill)
  - Tom Kern (Church Hill)
- District 3: Carter's Valley, Wallace, & Watterson
  - Danny Alvis (Surgoinsville)
  - Charles Thacker (Surgoinsville)
- District 4: Dykes, Keplar, North Rogersville, Surgoinsville, & Upper Beech
  - Josh Gilliam (Surgoinsville)
  - Chad Britton (Rogersville)
- District 5: Rogersville
  - Glenda Davis (Rogersville)
  - Jason Roach (Rogersville)
- District 6: Bean Station, Mooresburg and West Rogersville
  - Nancy Barker (Rogersville)
  - Larry Clonce (Rogersville)
- District 7: Bulls Gap, Cherokee, & St. Clair
  - Bobby Jinks (Bulls Gap)
  - Robbie Palmer (Rogersville)

== Geography ==
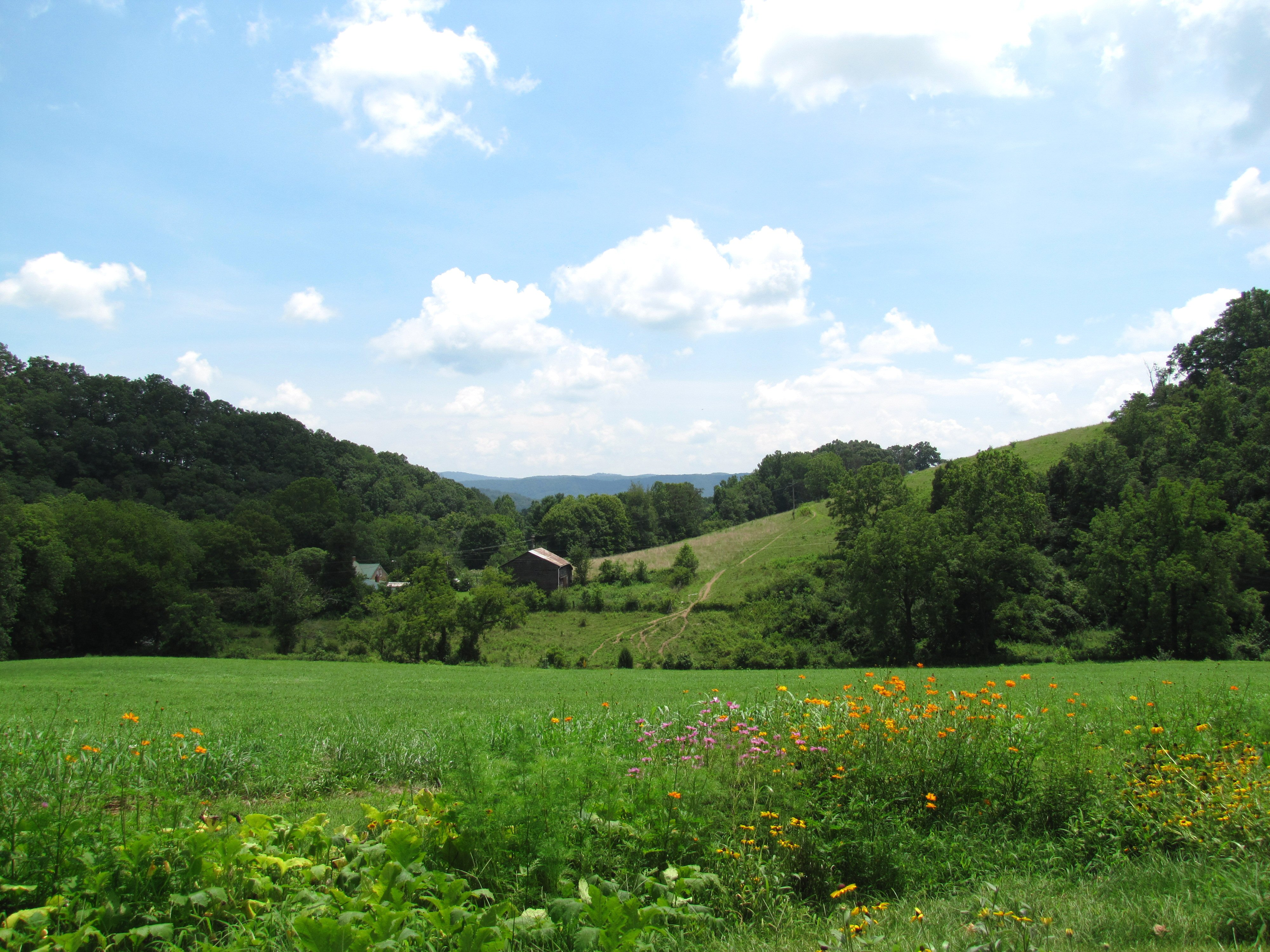
Lower Big Creek Valley, viewed from the Amis House

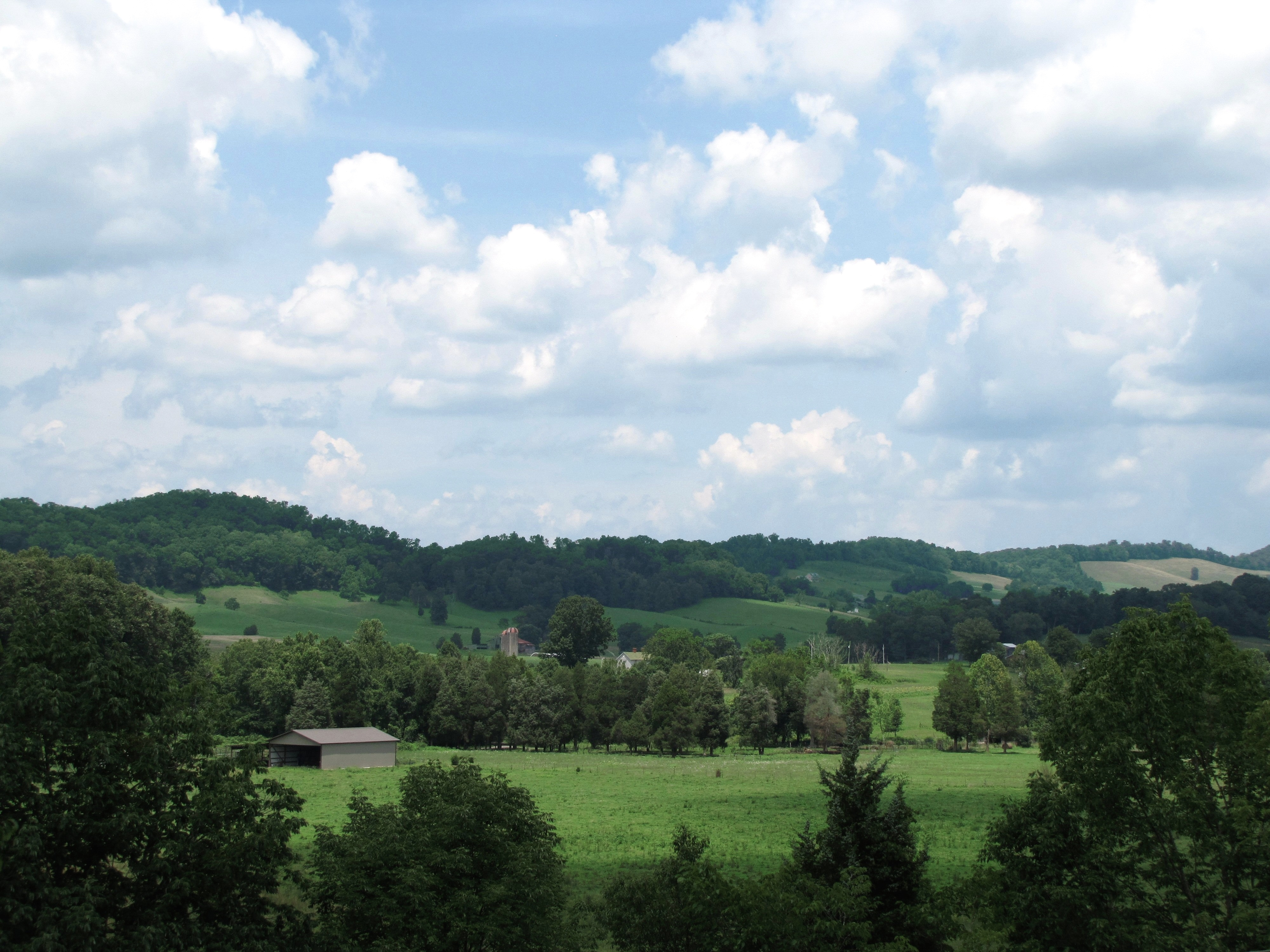
Carter Valley

According to the U.S. Census Bureau, the county has a total area of 500 square miles (1,300 km^{2}), of which 487 square miles (1,260 km^{2}) is land and 13 square miles (34 km^{2}) (2.5%) is water.

=== Adjacent counties ===
- Scott County, Virginia (north)
- Sullivan County (east)
- Washington County (southeast)
- Greene County (south)
- Hamblen County and Grainger County (southwest)
- Hancock County (west)

=== State protected area ===
- Kyles Ford Wildlife Management Area (part)

=== Other protected area ===
- Bays Mountain Park (part)

=== Other historic sites ===
- Amis House

== Demographics ==
Historical population
Census	Pop.	Note	%±
1790	6,970		—
1800	6,563		−5.8%
1810	7,643		16.5%
1820	10,949		43.3%
1830	13,683		25.0%
1840	15,035		9.9%
1850	13,370		−11.1%
1860	16,162		20.9%
1870	15,837		−2.0%
1880	20,610		30.1%
1890	22,246		7.9%
1900	24,267		9.1%
1910	23,587		−2.8%
1920	22,918		−2.8%
1930	24,117		5.2%
1940	28,523		18.3%
1950	30,494		6.9%
1960	30,468		−0.1%
1970	33,726		10.7%
1980	43,751		29.7%
1990	44,565		1.9%
2000	53,563		20.2%
2010	56,833		6.1%
2020	56,721		−0.2%
2025 (est.)	59,559	▲	5.0%
U.S. Decennial Census; 1790-1960 1900–1990; 1990-2000 2010–2014

=== Racial and ethnic composition ===
Hawkins County, Tennessee – Racial and ethnic composition Note: the US Census treats Hispanic/Latino as an ethnic category. This table excludes Latinos from the racial categories and assigns them to a separate category. Hispanics/Latinos may be of any race.
Race / ethnicity (NH = Non-Hispanic)	Pop 1980	Pop 1990	Pop 2000	Pop 2010	Pop 2020	% 1980	% 1990	% 2000	% 2010	% 2020
White alone (NH)	42,604	43,552	51,799	54,453	52,824	97.38%	97.73%	96.71%	95.81%	93.13%
Black or African American alone (NH)	809	740	822	735	671	1.85%	1.66%	1.53%	1.29%	1.18%
Native American or Alaska Native alone (NH)	61	77	85	100	104	0.14%	0.17%	0.16%	0.18%	0.18%
Asian alone (NH)	50	56	118	277	256	0.11%	0.13%	0.22%	0.49%	0.45%
Native Hawaiian or Pacific Islander alone (NH)	x	x	5	8	13	x	x	0.01%	0.01%	0.02%
Other race alone (NH)	15	6	38	21	110	0.03%	0.01%	0.07%	0.04%	0.19%
Mixed race or Multiracial (NH)	x	x	279	570	1,854	x	x	0.52%	1.00%	3.27%
Hispanic or Latino (any race)	212	134	417	669	889	0.48%	0.30%	0.78%	1.18%	1.57%
Total	43,751	44,565	53,563	56,833	56,721	100.00%	100.00%	100.00%	100.00%	100.00%

=== 2020 census ===
As of the 2020 census, there were 56,721 people and 15,917 families residing in the county. The median age was 46.2 years, with 19.9% of residents under the age of 18 and 22.0% age 65 or older. For every 100 females there were 97.3 males, and for every 100 females age 18 and over there were 94.7 males age 18 and over.

The racial makeup of the county was 93.7% White, 1.2% Black or African American, 0.2% American Indian and Alaska Native, 0.5% Asian, <0.1% Native Hawaiian and Pacific Islander, 0.7% from some other race, and 3.7% from two or more races. Hispanic or Latino residents of any race comprised 1.6% of the population.

37.9% of residents lived in urban areas, while 62.1% lived in rural areas.

There were 23,669 households in the county, of which 26.8% had children under the age of 18 living in them. Of all households, 50.0% were married-couple households, 18.7% were households with a male householder and no spouse or partner present, and 25.2% were households with a female householder and no spouse or partner present. About 27.8% of all households were made up of individuals and 13.5% had someone living alone who was 65 years of age or older.

There were 27,053 housing units, of which 12.5% were vacant. Among occupied housing units, 75.7% were owner-occupied and 24.3% were renter-occupied. The homeowner vacancy rate was 1.9% and the rental vacancy rate was 10.7%.

=== 2010 census ===
As of the 2010 United States census, there were 56,833 people living in the county. 96.5% were White, 1.3% Black or African American, 0.5% Asian, 0.2% Native American, 0.4% of some other race and 1.1% of two or more races. 1.2% were Hispanic or Latino (of any race). 47.0% were of American, 9.0% English, 8.0% German and 7.4% Irish ancestry.

=== 2000 census ===
As of the census of 2000, there were 53,563 people, 21,936 households, and 15,925 families living in the county. The population density was 110 people per square mile (42 people/km^{2}). There were 24,416 housing units at an average density of 50 units per square mile (19/km^{2}). The racial makeup of the county was 97.24% White, 1.55% Black or African American, 0.17% Native American, 0.23% Asian, 0.01% Pacific Islander, 0.23% from other races, and 0.56% from two or more races. 0.78% of the population were Hispanic or Latino of any race.

There were 21,936 households, out of which 31.30% had children under the age of 18 living with them, 59.30% were married couples living together, 9.80% had a female householder with no husband present, and 27.40% were non-families. 24.40% of all households were made up of individuals, and 9.60% had someone living alone who was 65 years of age or older. The average household size was 2.42 and the average family size was 2.86.

In the county, the population was spread out, with 23.30% under the, 7.50% from 18 to 24, 30.00% from 25 to 44, 25.90% from 45 to 64, and 13.20% who were 65 years of age or older. The median age was 38 years. For every 100 females, there were 94.70 males. For every 100 females age 18 and over, there were 92.50 males.

The median income for a household in the county was $31,300, and the median income for a family was $37,557. Males had a median income of $30,959 versus $22,082 for females. The per capita income for the county was $16,073. About 12.70% of families and 15.80% of the population were below the poverty line, including 20.40% of those under age 18 and 17.70% of those age 65 or over.

== Economy ==
According to a data profile produced by the Tennessee Department of Economic and Community Development in 2018, the top employers in the county are:

#	Employer	# of Employees
1	Hawkins County Board of Education	1,100
2	BAE Systems Inc.	850
3	AGC Flat Glass North America, Inc.	550
4	Barrette Outdoor Living, Inc.	500
5	Cooper-Standard Automotive	450
6	Hutchinson Sealing Systems	370
7	TRW Automotive	335
8	Walmart (Kingsport)	300
9	Sam Dong, Inc.	215
10	Baldor Electric Company	207

== Transportation ==
=== Major highways ===
- U.S. Route 11W
- U.S. Route 11E
- State Route 31
- State Route 66
- State Route 70, Trail of the Lonesome Pine
- State Route 66
- State Route 94
- State Route 113
- State Route 344
- State Route 346
- State Route 347

State Route 172 formerly went into Hawkins County, it now ends in Greene County at Interstate 81 exit 36 in the town of Baileyton.

=== Airports ===
The Hawkins County Airport is a county-owned public-use airport located six nautical miles (7 mi, 11 km) northeast of the central business district of Rogersville.

== Communities ==
=== Cities ===
Rogersville

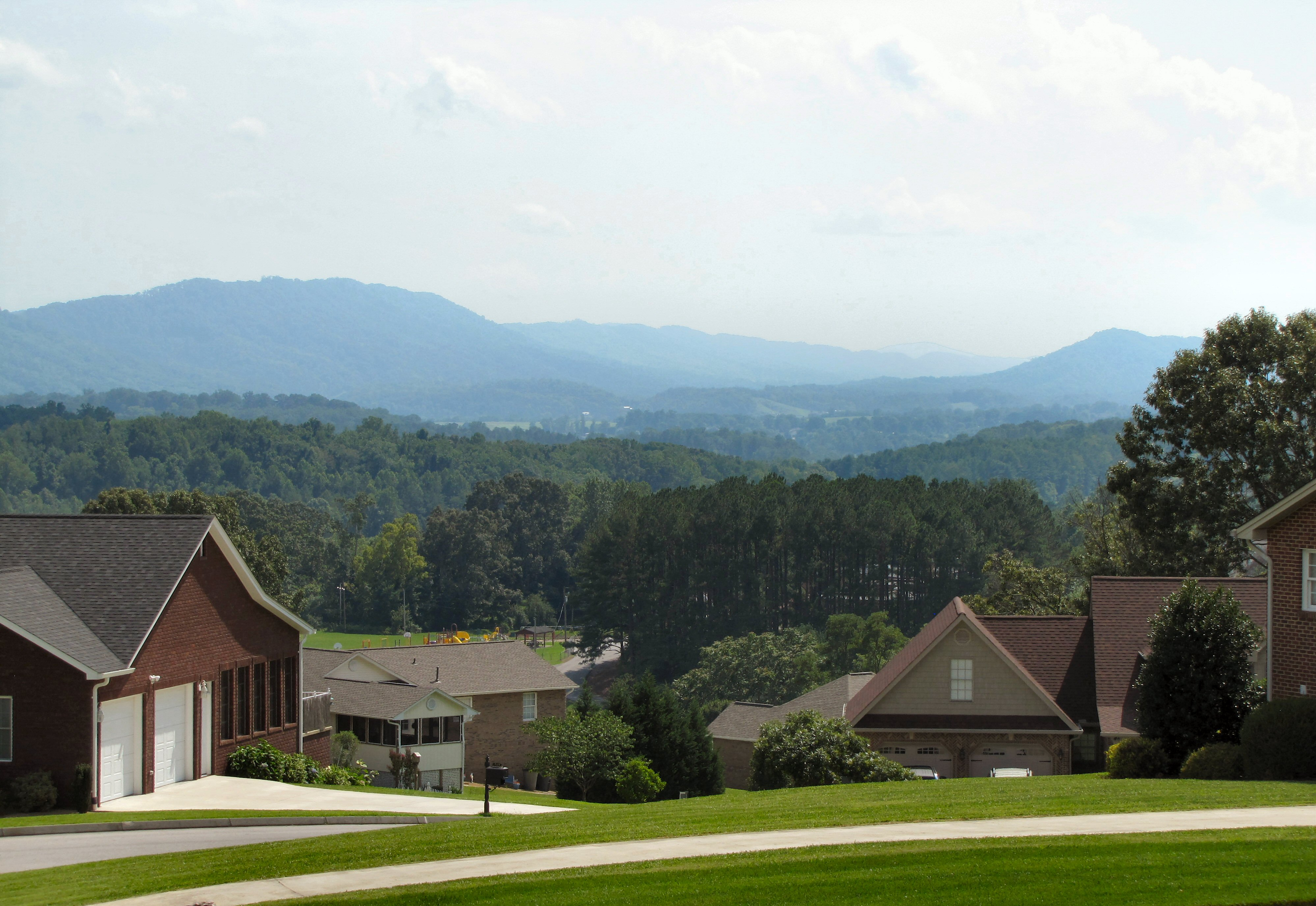
Houses in Mount Carmel

- Church Hill
- Kingsport (partial)

=== Towns ===
- Bean Station (partial, mostly in Grainger)
- Bulls Gap
- Mount Carmel
- Rogersville (county seat)
- Surgoinsville

=== Census-designated place ===
- Mooresburg

=== Unincorporated communities ===
- Austins Mill
- Eidson
- Midway
- Persia
- Saint Clair

== Politics ==
United States presidential election results for Hawkins County, Tennessee
Year	Republican		Democratic		Third party(ies)	
Year	No.	%	No.	%	No.	%
1912	828	32.70%	1,026	40.52%	678	26.78%
1916	1,739	60.03%	1,142	39.42%	16	0.55%
1920	2,650	65.11%	1,381	33.93%	39	0.96%
1924	2,600	61.22%	1,596	37.58%	51	1.20%
1928	2,965	71.33%	1,186	28.53%	6	0.14%
1932	2,890	54.51%	2,391	45.10%	21	0.40%
1936	3,300	59.04%	2,278	40.76%	11	0.20%
1940	3,314	60.72%	2,108	38.62%	36	0.66%
1944	3,692	67.64%	1,756	32.17%	10	0.18%
1948	3,637	62.50%	2,019	34.70%	163	2.80%
1952	5,295	68.19%	2,404	30.96%	66	0.85%
1956	6,916	68.04%	3,180	31.29%	68	0.67%
1960	7,010	72.48%	2,586	26.74%	76	0.79%
1964	5,712	57.68%	4,191	42.32%	0	0.00%
1968	6,217	60.78%	2,213	21.64%	1,798	17.58%
1972	7,791	72.31%	2,608	24.20%	376	3.49%
1976	6,407	51.62%	5,931	47.78%	74	0.60%
1980	7,836	57.92%	5,283	39.05%	410	3.03%
1984	9,863	66.67%	4,802	32.46%	128	0.87%
1988	9,356	63.88%	5,212	35.59%	78	0.53%
1992	7,758	47.64%	6,623	40.67%	1,904	11.69%
1996	8,164	51.21%	6,367	39.94%	1,410	8.85%
2000	10,071	58.90%	6,753	39.50%	274	1.60%
2004	13,447	66.46%	6,684	33.04%	102	0.50%
2008	14,756	70.13%	5,930	28.18%	354	1.68%
2012	14,382	72.50%	5,088	25.65%	367	1.85%
2016	16,648	80.14%	3,507	16.88%	619	2.98%
2020	20,405	82.20%	4,083	16.45%	336	1.35%
2024	22,066	84.01%	3,987	15.18%	213	0.81%

== Education ==
School districts include:

- Hawkins County School District
- Kingsport City School District
- Rogersville City Schools (elementary only, with secondary students going to Hawkins County schools)

== In popular culture ==
The film, The River, was filmed in Hawkins County and the surrounding area. Universal Studios purchased four hundred forty acres of land for the movie.

The post-apocalyptic novel series "The Living Saga" (by Jaron McFall) takes place largely in Hawkins County. The main character, Cedric, is from Mooresburg and was a student at Cherokee High School in Rogersville.

== See also ==
- Flag of Hawkins County, Tennessee
- National Register of Historic Places listings in Hawkins County, Tennessee
