= Tennessee House of Representatives 9th district =

State legislative district in Tennessee

Tennessee's 9th State House of Representatives district
- Map of Tennessee House districts with the 9th district shaded in red
Representative
Gary Hicks; R–Rogersville
since 2016
- Demographics: 94% White; 1% Black; 2% Hispanic; 1% Asian; 2% Multiracial
- Population (2024): 68,089

The Tennessee House of Representatives 9th district is one of 99 legislative districts in the Tennessee House of Representatives. It represents all of Hancock County and portions of Claiborne and Hawkins counties. The district includes Rogersville, Sneedville, Tazewell, and Harrogate. It has been represented by Gary Hicks since 2016.

== Demographics ==
The Tennessee Comptroller estimates the 2024 population at 68,089.

- 93.9% of the district is White
- 1.1% of the district is Black
- 2% of the district is Hispanic
- 0.6% of the district is Asian
- 0.1% of the district is another race
- 0.1% of the district is Native American
- 2.4% of the district is Two or more races

Detailed demographic data for District 9 is also available through Census Reporter.

== History ==
The 88th General Assembly was the first with the modern numbered system of districts. The geography of the district has changed several times as a result of redistricting. Following the redistricting conducted after the 1980 census, the 9th district consisted of Hancock County and portions of Hawkins County. The district continued to encompass Hawkins and Hancock counties throughout the remainder of the 1980s and the 1990s.

By the 102nd General Assembly (2001–2002), the district consisted of Hawkins and Hancock counties. Following redistricting after the 2000 census, the 103rd General Assembly district consisted of Hancock County and part of Hawkins County. This configuration remained in place through the 107th General Assembly.

Following the redistricting conducted after the 2010 census, the district continued to consist of Hancock and Hawkins counties. This configuration continued through the 112th General Assembly.

Following redistricting after the 2020 census, the district was expanded into Claiborne County. It currently consists of Hancock County and portions of Claiborne and Hawkins counties.

== List of representatives ==
Representative	Party	Years of service	General Assembly	Residence
Gary Hicks	Republican	2015–present	110th, 111th, 112th, 113th, 114th	Rogersville
Mike Harrison	Republican	2003–2015	103rd, 104th, 105th, 106th, 107th, 108th, 109th	Rogersville
Ken Givens	Democratic	1989–2002	96th, 97th, 98th, 99th, 100th, 101st, 102nd	Rogersville
Bruce Hurley	Republican	1973–1988	88th, 89th, 90th, 91st, 92nd, 93rd, 94th, 95th	Rogersville
