= Gary Hicks (politician) =

American politician (born 1977)

Member of the Tennessee House of Representatives from the 9th district
- Incumbent
- Assumed office January 12, 2016
- Preceded by: Michael Harrison

Personal details
- Born: Gary W. Hicks Jr. October 4, 1977 (age 49) Rogersville, Tennessee, U.S.
- Party: Republican
- Spouse: Laura Armstrong
- Children: 2
- Education: East Tennessee State University (BS); University of Tennessee (MBA)
- Website: House website

Gary W. Hicks Jr. (born October 4, 1977) is an American politician serving as a member of the Tennessee House of Representatives from the 9th district. He is a member of the Republican Party and has represented the district since his 2016 appointment.

== Early life and education ==
Gary W. Hicks Jr. was born on October 4, 1977. He graduated from East Tennessee State University with a BS in computer science and from the University of Tennessee with an MBA.

== Career and community work ==
Hicks worked as a network administrator for Rural Health Services. He has also worked as a technology director for Rogersville City Schools. He was a member of the Hawkins County Commission from 2006 to 2015. He has also served as a chair of United Way.

== Tennessee House of Representatives (2016–present) ==
=== Appointment ===
In October 2015, Michael Harrison, representative for the 9th district of the Tennessee House of Representatives, announced that he would resign his seat to become the executive director of the County Mayors Association. That December, Hicks was appointed to fill the vacancy left by the resignation. He was sworn in on January 12, 2016. Hicks later became chair of the House Finance, Ways and Means Subcommittee.

=== Tenure ===
In 2021, Hicks and Jack Johnson sponsored legislation allocating state funds toward Nissan Stadium, the home stadium of the Tennessee Titans. Hicks characterized the funding as an investment supporting economic development, suggesting the renovation would generate approximately $600 million for the state.

In 2023, Hicks supported resolutions to expel three Democratic representatives, Gloria Johnson, Justin Jones, and Justin Pearson, from the legislature for violating decorum rules during their participation in a gun reform protest following the Covenant School shooting. The expulsion was widely characterized as unprecedented.

In 2025, Hicks voted in committee against the Education Freedom Act, which established a major school voucher program and was heavily promoted by Governor Bill Lee. The following year, after the bill went into effect, Hicks voted against another expansion to the program on the House floor.

In 2026, Hicks opposed a bill that would restrict primary election voting to party-affiliated voters. The proposal was eventually voted down in committee.

== Personal life ==
Hicks is married to his wife Laura (née Armstrong), with whom he has two daughters. He is a Baptist and attends Shepard's Chapel Missionary Baptist Church in Rogersville.
