= Charlie Chase (broadcaster) =

American broadcaster and radio and TV personality and host

- Born: October 19, 1952 (age 72); Rogersville, Tennessee, U.S.
- Occupation(s): Radio and television personality, host, and broadcaster
- Years active: 1986–present
- Spouse: Karen (1971-present) (Two children)

Charlie Chase (born October 19, 1952) is an American radio and television host best known for his work on The Nashville Network program Crook & Chase.

== Childhood ==
Chase was born October 19, 1952, in Rogersville, Tennessee. He attended school at Rogersville City School and began his radio career at age 13, working part-time—and later full-time—at WRGS AM 1370 Radio in Rogersville.

== Early career ==
Chase graduated from Rogersville High School in 1970, after working on-air jobs as Program Director and Music Director at stations in Kingsport and Knoxville. He moved to Nashville in 1974, where he went to work at WMAK Radio (AM-1300), the city's top-rated station at the time. Later, he moved to the home of the Grand Ole Opry, WSM AM 650, replacing Pat Sajak when Sajak decided to pursue television (first as a full-time weather reporter for the station KNBC, then as the longtime host of Wheel of Fortune until 2024).

While working at WSM Radio, Chase began doing music reports for WSM-TV (now WSMV) in Nashville. It led to his being offered the host position for the station's long-running midday magazine program in 1982.

== Television career ==
It was during that stint that television producer Jim Owens got in contact with Chase and pitched the idea for the television show This Week in Country Music, which was cohosted by Owens's soon-to-be wife Lorianne Crook and debuted in 1983.

During this period, Chase also hosted and produced a series of specials: Funny Business with Charlie Chase and The Crook and Chase Show.

In September 1993, Chase released an album, My Wife… My Life, on Epic Records.

In October 2009, Charlie began to appear in television ads for the Hormone Replacement Center.

On December 22, 2009, Charlie chose to leave Tennessee Mornings to care for an ailing family member.

== Discography ==
=== Albums ===
Title	Details
My Wife… My Life	Release date: September 21, 1993; Formats: CD, cassette; Label: Epic Records

=== Singles ===
Year	Title	Album
1993	"My Wife"	My Wife… My Life

== See also ==
- Lorianne Crook
- Rogersville, Tennessee
- The Nashville Network
- WRGS Radio; Rogersville, Tennessee
