= Rogersville High School =

Rogersville High School may refer to:

- A high school Rogersville, Alabama, Lauderdale County High School
- A high school in Rogersville, Tennessee, controlled by the Hawkins County School District
