= Crook & Chase =

American country music television program

- Created by: Lorianne Crook; Charlie Chase
- Presented by: Lorianne Crook; Charlie Chase
- Country of origin: United States
- Original language: English

Production
- Running time: approx. 44 minutes

Original release
- Network: The Nashville Network (1986-1999); RFD-TV (2008-2012)
- Release: April 1, 1986

Crook & Chase is an American television talk show hosted by Lorianne Crook and Charlie Chase, focusing primarily, but not exclusively, on country music.

The pair had first worked together on the weekly syndicated program "This Week In Country Music," which was later titled Crook & Chase Countdown and distributed by Premiere Radio Networks.

The series originally aired on The Nashville Network in primetime from 1986 to 1996, then called The Nashville Record Review (later presented by Katie Haas and Bill Cody). It was called Crook and Chase from 1986 to 1993, and then became known as Music City Tonight when Crook and Chase replaced the popular show Nashville Now after its host Ralph Emery retired. Crook and Chase moved to daytime syndication from 1996 to 1997. After their syndicated show was canceled, they returned to host their own show on The Nashville Network where they stayed until it was canceled in 1999 as part of TNN's overhaul into a more male-oriented general interest channel, which eventually was renamed Spike, which is now known today as Paramount Network.

During the early 1990s, they hosted "The Nashville Record Review with Crook and Chase", which was a weekly countdown of the Top 40 country hits of the week, on radio under the name of TNNR (The Nashville Network Radio)

After a nine-year hiatus, the show was revived for nearly three years on RFD-TV beginning January 17, 2008. In fall 2010, the show started airing in weekly syndication, and archive reruns of the series air in various timeslots on Luken Communications' digital subchannel networks, My Family TV and the Retro Television Network. The show's spinoff is Music City Tonight, which aired from 1993 to 1995 on TNN, with reruns airing until 2000. Music City Tonight airs in reruns on Heartland, also owned by Luken.
