= McGavock High School =

Location
- 3150 McGavock Pike; Nashville, Tennessee 37214; United States; 36°11′09″N 86°40′42″W

Information
- School type: Public, High school
- Established: 1971; 55 years ago
- School district: Metropolitan Nashville Public Schools
- Principal: Angela Bailey \ 2023-24: Bruce Jackson
- Teaching staff: 109.26
- Grades: 9–12
- Enrollment: 1,907 (2023–2024)
- Student to teacher ratio: 17.45
- Colors: Red, white and blue
- Mascot: Raider
- Website: mcgavock.mnps.org

McGavock High School (commonly McGavock or Big Mac) is a public high school located in Nashville, Tennessee. The high school is a Model Academy School (affiliated with the National Career Academy Coalition).

In January 2014, President Barack Obama visited McGavock High School to discuss the success of the academy model.

== History ==
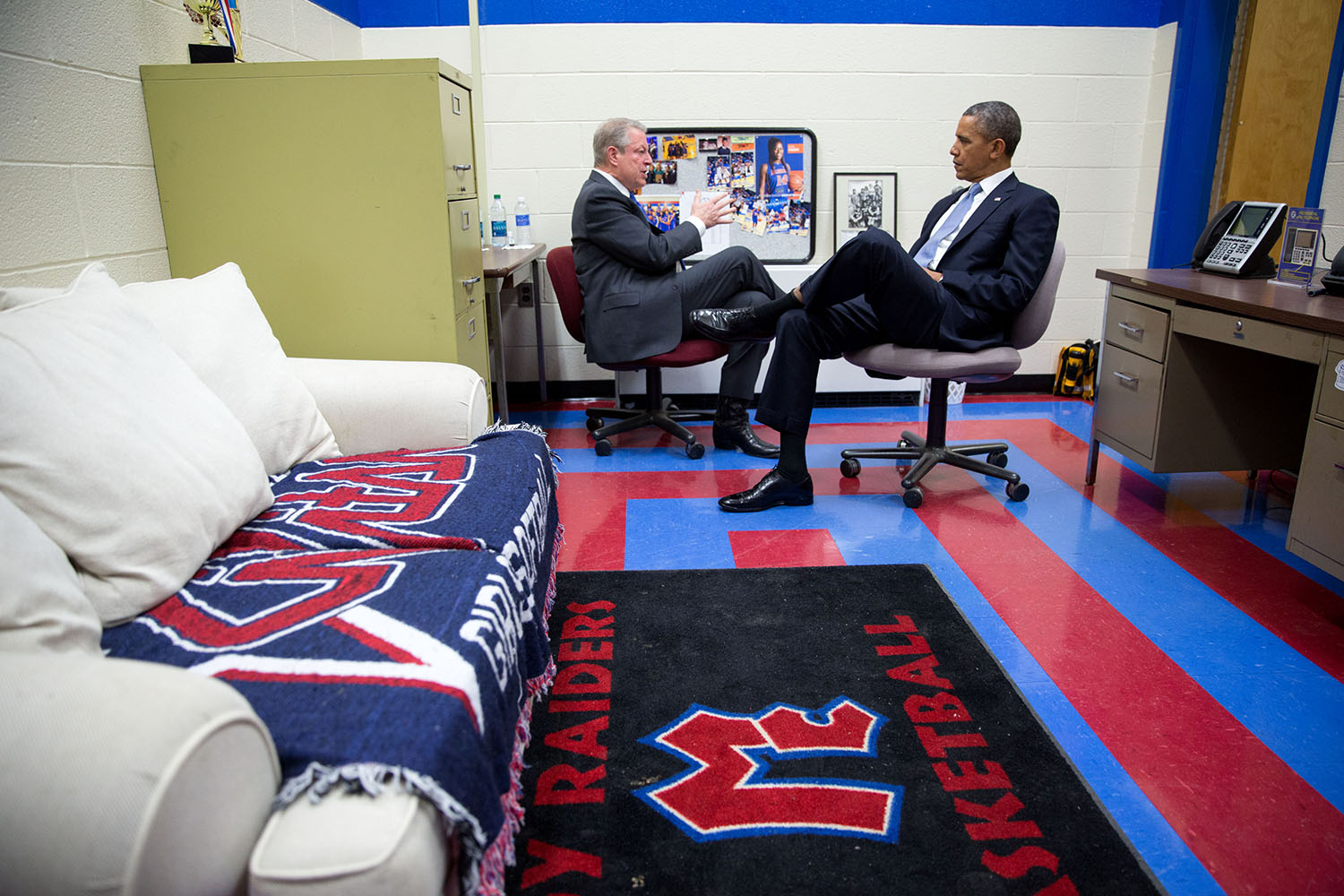
Al Gore (left) and Barack Obama at McGavock High School, 2014

McGavock Comprehensive High School opened in 1971. It initially served students in grades ten through twelve who had previously attended Cameron, Donelson and Two Rivers high schools. McGavock added ninth grade in 1978.

McGavock is a part of the Metropolitan Nashville Public Schools system. It sits on a part of the McGavock plantation that was purchased by Metro Parks in 1968 for $68,000. The land is still the property of the park service. The school was named for the antebellum Two Rivers mansion built by David H. McGavock.

McGavock was the first truly comprehensive high school built in Nashville. Planning for the school took place during the administration of Superintendent Dr. John Harris. Dr. James Burns, the resident consultant for secondary development for Metro-Nashville Public Schools, developed a structure that would serve as a model for other comprehensive high schools.

McGavock was the first high school in Nashville that combined the academic program with extensive vocational training.

== Facilities ==
McGavock is the largest high school in Tennessee, with a little under 500,000 sq. feet. McGavock has four softball fields, a baseball diamond, six tennis courts, a football stadium and a track. The 14-acre building houses 82 classrooms, 14 science labs, a credit union, a flight simulator, a bistro, nine Career and Technical shop/classroom areas (including a student-run courtroom and a health science lab) seven business education labs, two gymnasiums, two cafeterias, a 586 seat auditorium, and formerly a two-story library (currently a one story on the second floor) with fiction, audio-visuals, materials and equipment on one level, and non-fiction and computers on the other. It has a green room, a planetarium, a computer and technical education (CTE) lab equipped with 60 computers and a CTE presentation room equipped with state-of-the-art projection capabilities.

== McGavock Band ==
Established in 1971, the McGavock High School Band paved a tradition unlike any other in the state of Tennessee. Founding director, Kenny Hull established the band leading to recognition in the 1970s. Jeff Beckman (McGavock Band alumnus) continued the legacy from 1986-2013 handing the mantle to John David Hazlett (McGavock Band alumnus c/o 98, Assistant Director 2004-2013) from 2013 through 2024.

The McGavock High School Band paved a long and rich tradition of excellence including 25 time state champion Governors Cups. The band has been named Grand Champion at the MTSU Contest of Champions 13 times, most recently in 2019 under the director of John David Hazlett and David DePriest.

The McGavock Wind Ensemble consistently achieved superior ratings at Concert Performance Assessments. The ensemble performed in 2017 for only the third time at the TMEA State Music Conference. The wind ensemble received the ASBDA’s Award of Distinction in Concert Performance in 2015 for straight superior ratings in every sub category from every judge.

The McGavock Band is a 3 time Bands of America Southeast Regional Champion and Grand National Finalist/Semi-Finalist. The band represented the state of Tennessee in numerous national performances including the Rose Parade, the Macy’s Thanksgiving Parade, the Orange Bowl Parade, the Philadelphia Thanksgiving Parade, The Chicago St. Patrick’s Day Parade, the Hollywood Christmas Parade, and performed at the WWII Memorial in Washington, DC.

The McGavock Band has been awarded the Sudler Shield by the John Philip Sousa Foundation in the 1990s and named one of the ten finest bands in the United States by the National Band Association. The band also hosted the Music City Invitational 1986 through 2019 which awarded the prestigious Mayors Cup Trophies.

Ther the state championship 25 times: 1972–1979, 1982, 1987–1991, 1993–1994, 1997–2000, 2002–2005, 2019.

Winner of internationally acclaimed John Philip Sousa Foundation Sudler Shield Award 1994 Bands of America Southeastern Regional Champions, Georgia Dome, Atlanta, Georgia 1995, 1996 Finalist band in Bands of America Grand National Championships in 1986, 1987, 1988, 1990

Southern Regional Grand Champions in Bands of America Southern Regional Championships - 1990.

Recognized by the National Band Association as one of the Ten Finest Bands in the United States.

== Notable alumni ==
- Chris Claybrooks, football player
- Lorianne Crook, Co-host of Crook & Chase, Music City Tonight
- Dwayne Johnson ("The Rock"), actor and professional wrestler (Attended but did not graduate)
