= Bruce Hurley =

American politician (1934–2020)

Member of the Tennessee House of Representatives from the 9th district
- In office 1971–1989
- Preceded by: Bill Jenkins
- Succeeded by: Ken Givens

Personal details
- Born: February 16, 1934 Hancock County, Tennessee
- Died: November 4, 2020 (aged 86) Kingsport, Tennessee
- Party: Republican
- Children: 1
- Education: East Tennessee State University
- Occupation: Safety Engineer, Farmer, Businessman

Bruce Hurley (February 16, 1934 – November 4, 2020), was an American politician in the state of Tennessee. Hurley served in the Tennessee House of Representatives as a Republican from the 9th District from 1971 to 1989.

A native of Hancock County, Tennessee, he was a safety engineer, real estate developer, farmer. and businessman. Hurley served in the United States Army and was an alumnus of East Tennessee State University.

In 2017, Hurley was convicted of three counts of shoplifting in Rogersville, Tennessee.
