= Gary Beaty =

American singer-songwriter

- Born: August 25, 1943 (age 83); Jamestown, Tennessee
- Presenting career
- Station: WSM/WSM-FM
- Stations: TNN, RFD-TV

Gary Beaty (born August 25, 1943) is an American country music disc jockey and television announcer in Nashville, Tennessee. He served as a disc jockey at Nashville's WSM AM/-FM and as an announcer on The Nashville Network (TNN) and RFD-TV.

== Early career ==
Gary Beaty, the youngest of four children, was born in Jamestown, Tennessee to Winsted and Roxie Beaty. Beaty got his start in radio as a teenager at Jamestown's WCLC (AM). While attending college at the University of Tennessee-Knoxville, Beaty worked part-time at WBIR. He then continued working as either a DJ, news director, or music director for a variety of smaller stations such as WMTS and WGNS in Murfreesboro, Tennessee, WMSR (AM) in Manchester, Tennessee, and WKGN in Knoxville, Tennessee. From 1967-1972 Beaty worked on a staff with nationally known DJ Hall of Famer Scott Shannon at WMAK. Afterward, Beaty took a job at WBSR in Pensacola, Florida and then moved on to WAAY in Huntsville, Alabama. It was at WAAY where Beaty had his first experience in TV, working as a weekend weatherman for WAAY-TV.

== WSM and TNN (1976-2000) ==
In 1976, Beaty returned to Nashville to work as a full-time disc jockey on WSM's AM and FM stations. At The Nashville Network (TNN), Beaty served as the announcer for Nashville Now from 1983-1993, occasionally filling in for the host, well-known country music, national and Tennessee Radio Hall of Fame member Ralph Emery. Coincidentally, Beaty was the fill-in host for the show when Garth Brooks, Shania Twain, and Toby Keith all made their cable network debuts. In the late 1980s, Beaty also co-hosted an afternoon show on TNN featuring music videos called Video PM alongside Cathy Martindale. From 1985-1991, Beaty acted as co-host of the syndicated telecasts of three Farm Aid concerts and also announced two years of Hee Haw. During this time, Beaty achieved a grand slam record by announcing The Academy of Country Music Awards, The GMA Dove Awards, The TNN/Music City News Awards, and the Country Music Association Awards, all in a single season.

== Present career ==
Since leaving the Gaylord Entertainment Company, Beaty has kept busy freelancing on multiple commercial and industrial projects. From 1996–present, Beaty has become known as the "Iron Man of Nashville commercial television," with over 1000 consecutive weekly live telecasts for a Nashville automobile dealer on NewsChannel 5 WTVF.
