= Ronald Brooks =

Ronald Brooks may refer to:

- Ronald Brooks (cricketer) (1899–1980), English cricketer and British Army officer
- R. B. Kitaj (Ronald Brooks Kitaj, 1932–2007), American artist
- Ronald E. Brooks (1937–2018), United States Army general
- Ron Brooks (born 1988), American former NFL player
- Ronnie Baker Brooks (born 1967), American Chicago blues and soul musician
- Ronnie Brooks (Law & Order: UK), a character in the British TV series Law & Order: UK, played by Bradley Walsh
