= Shotgun Red =

Television puppet

Shotgun Red, performed by Steve Hall

Shotgun Red is a puppet best known as a co-host for the television talk show Nashville Now, which aired from 1983–1993 on The Nashville Network (TNN). Often appearing alongside the show's host Ralph Emery, Shotgun Red was performed by Steve Hall, a musician, comedian and voice artist who was born in Sheldon, Iowa.

The puppet, best recognized for his large gray mustache and straw cowboy hat, was discovered by Hall in 1980 in a Minnesota hobby shop, where he bought it for forty dollars. Hall first used Shotgun Red as the emcee for his band at the time, Southbound '76. After traveling to Nashville to compete in the final round of The Seagram's 7 battle of the bands contest, Hall and Shotgun "crashed" Ralph Emery's local morning TV show. Emery fell in love with the little puppet and later made him his co-host on Nashville Now. The puppet's popularity led to the duo releasing two albums for RCA Records, Ralph & Red: Songs for Children and Christmas With Ralph & Red (1989).

Shotgun Red went on to appear on the television variety show Hee Haw regularly for eight years and host TNN's music video show Country Clips for six years. He appeared at the Grand Ole Opry and the puppet remained a part of Steve Hall's Shotgun Red Band, which operated out of Nashville, aboard the General Jackson Showboat for 15 years and the Nashville Nightlife Dinner Theater. Hall and Shotgun Red were nominated ten times for the Music City News Comedy Act of the Year. Shotgun Red also hosted his very own television show for RFD-TV for four seasons from 2011 to 2014 called "The Shotgun Red Variety Show".

Hall died on December 28, 2018, at the age of 64 in his hometown of Brainerd, Minnesota, where he was taking a trip to go ice fishing. He died of natural causes.

Alongside his fiancée "Miss Sheila" Keeton, Hall started a cooking show on his YouTube channel called "Cooking with Shotgun Red" which reached over 100,000 subscribers. Since his passing, Miss Sheila and longtime band member and friend Jennifer Bruce have continued the channel.
