= Heritage Days =

Coordinates: 36.4042°N 83.0051°W

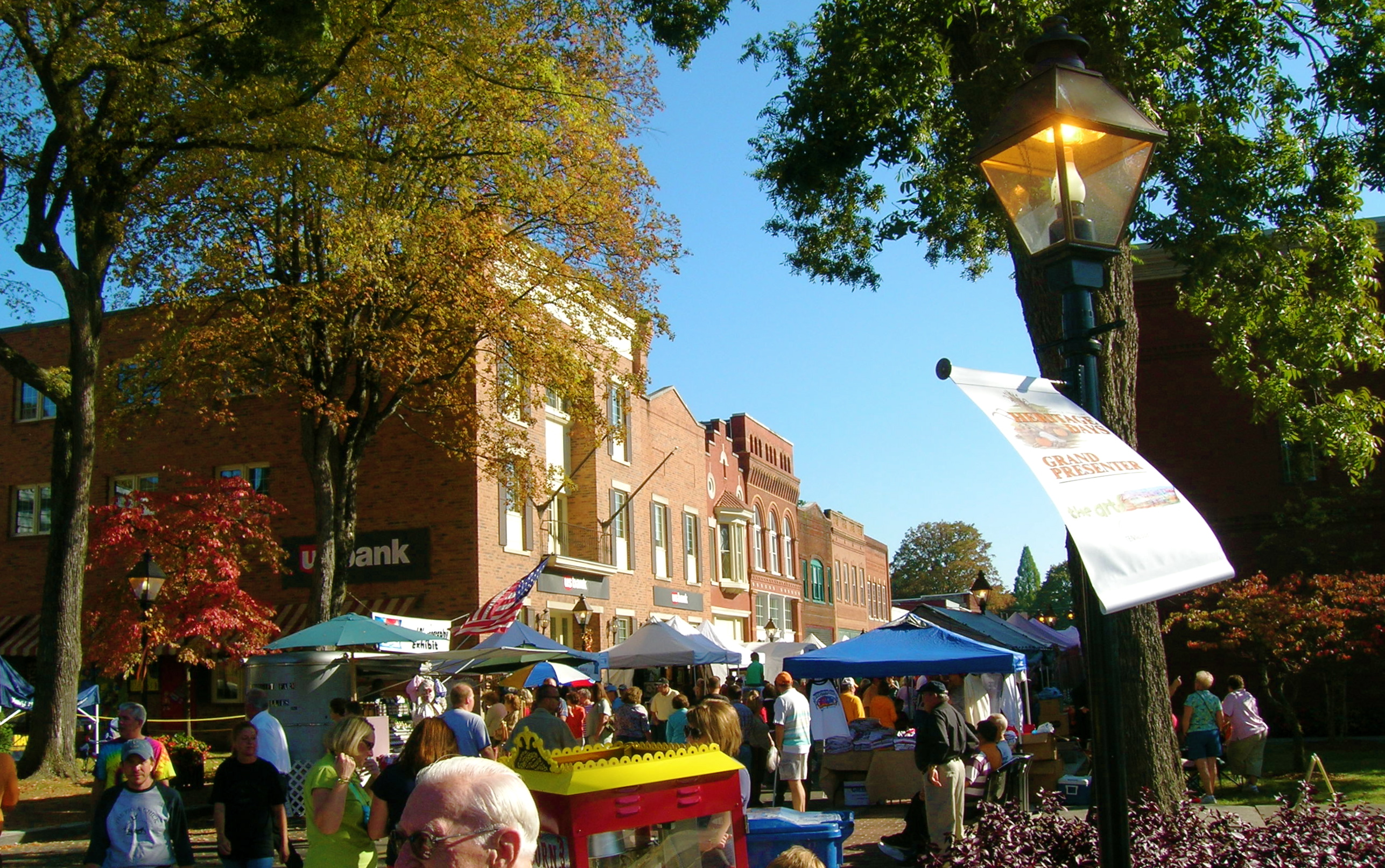
Downtown Rogersville during Heritage Days in 2008.

Heritage Days is an annual three-day arts, crafts and entertainment street festival held in downtown Rogersville, Tennessee during the second full weekend of October. The harvest- and history-themed festival began in 1978.

== History ==
Hawkins County Heritage Days began in October 1978 when a small crowd gathered, despite heavy rain, on downtown Rogersville's Courthouse Square to raise funds for the nascent Rogersville Heritage Association.

The organization, whose purpose is to "preserve, protect, promote, and celebrate heritage of Rogersville, Tennessee", envisioned an annual event to commemorate the historic town and to emulate the nineteenth century harvest festivals held in Rogersville after the American Civil War.

== Today ==
Heritage Days have grown to an event with estimated attendance of almost 40,000, more than six times the population of Rogersville itself. It is still sponsored by the Rogersville Heritage Association, and still features artisans, craftspeople and entertainers, many of whom perpetuate the mountain arts and way of life that have slowly vanished from the hills of East Tennessee.

The Southeast Tourism Society, a regional promoter of tourism and excellence in tourism programming, recognized Heritage Days as a "Top Twenty Event in the Southeast for October". The festival has won multiple times at Tennessee Festivals and Events. In 2014, Oliver Pelle performed on Main Street for Heritage Days.
