= Walters State Community College =

Public college in Morristown, Tennessee, US

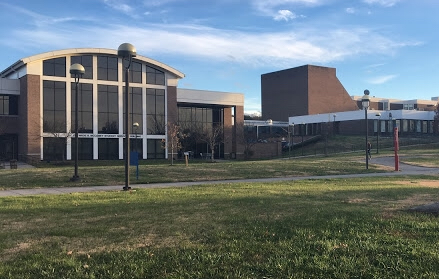
- WSCC campus in 2018
- Type: Public community college
- Established: September 1970
- Affiliations: NJCAA Region VII
- Endowment: $6.9 million
- President: Saul Reyes
- Faculty: 480
- Students: 6,980
- Location: Morristown, Tennessee, United States; 36.214°N 83.263°W
- Campus: Suburban
- Colors: Red, White and Navy
- Nicknames: Senators & Lady Senators
- Website: ws.edu

Walters State Community College (WSCC or Walters State) is a public community college based in Morristown, Tennessee. It was founded in 1970 and is operated by the Tennessee Board of Regents. The college was named in honor of former United States Senator Herbert S. Walters.

The college serves ten predominantly rural East Tennessee counties, located in the area of the Clinch and Great Smoky Mountains with five campuses totaling approximately 6,200 degree-seeking, commuting students. The college offers over 100 programs of study, ranging from transfer programs to four-year universities to associate degree programs and technical certificates.

== History ==
In 1957, the Pierce-Albright Report was presented to the Tennessee legislature, detailing situations of higher education in the state. It showed many citizens of the state of Tennessee to be without sufficient access to colleges and universities, and led to the allocation of $200,000 in 1963 to implement the recommendations of the report.

The State Board of Education developed a plan to locate community colleges in the underserved regions of Tennessee within a reasonable distance of travel to the majority of residents in each region. In 1965, the Tennessee General Assembly certified the establishment of the first wave of these institutions. In 1970, Walters State Community College became the sixth college created in this process, named for former U.S. Senator Herbert S. Walters who was responsible for the development of a community college in Morristown.

In 2017, a hiking-mountain biking trail system would be constructed at the main campus at a natural area surrounding the college's public safety complex.

=== Presidents ===
- James W. Clark was appointed as the first president of Walters State Community College in 1969 and served in that capacity until 1974. While classes were held in temporary quarters in Morristown during the first year of the college's operation, Clark oversaw the completion of The College Center, the first building built on the campus and opened in 1971.
- Jack E. Campbell, who was hired in 1974 to succeed Clark, was one of the youngest college presidents at the time. During his tenure, the campus expanded from the one campus location in Morristown with a population of 1,736 students to having four campuses, with a total student population of 6,000 credit degree-seeking students and 5,000 students in non-degree, job training, and continuing education courses at the time of his retirement in 2005. The College Center would be renamed in Campbell's honor.
- Wade B. McCamey, who had previously been the president of Roane State Community College and previously served as vice-president of academic affairs at Walters State Community College, was selected in 2005 and served as president until 2016. During his time at the college, the college built additional facilities on the Sevierville Campus, the Morristown campus (with one of the facilities named the Dr. Wade B. McCamey Student Services building upon his retirement) and the Greeneville-Greene County campus(Named The Niswonger Campus for Greeneville Philanthropist, Scott Niswonger).
- Anthony (Tony) Miksa was named the fourth president of Walters State in May 2016 and served from June 2016 until June 2025. During that time, Walters State was nominated for Community College of the Year awards in TBR's annual SOAR (Statewide Outstanding Achievement Recognition) Awards in 2022 and 2023. The college also completed several capital projects, including the construction of a 35,000 square-foot building on the college’s Sevier County Campus and the 104,000 square-foot building on the Niswonger Campus in Greeneville.
- Thomas Sewell, who previously served as dean of technical education from 2006 to 2022 at WSCC, was appointed to serve as interim president upon Miksa's departure. He will serve as interim president until a permanent successor is named.
- Saul Reyes was named the fifth president of Walters State in August 2025. He will begin his tenure in September 2025.

== Athletics ==
Walters State's athletics programs are part of both the National Junior College Athletic Association (NJCAA) and the Tennessee Community College Athletic Association (TCCAA). The teams are known as the Senators or Lady Senators, with the team colors being red, white, and blue.

Men's sports	Women's sports
Baseball	Basketball
Basketball	Cross country
Cross country	Softball
Golf	Volleyball
Cycling

== Campuses ==
The Tennessee Board of Regents designates ten counties as being served by Walters State Community College:

- Claiborne
- Cocke
- Grainger
- Greene
- Hamblen
- Hancock
- Hawkins
- Jefferson
- Sevier
- Union

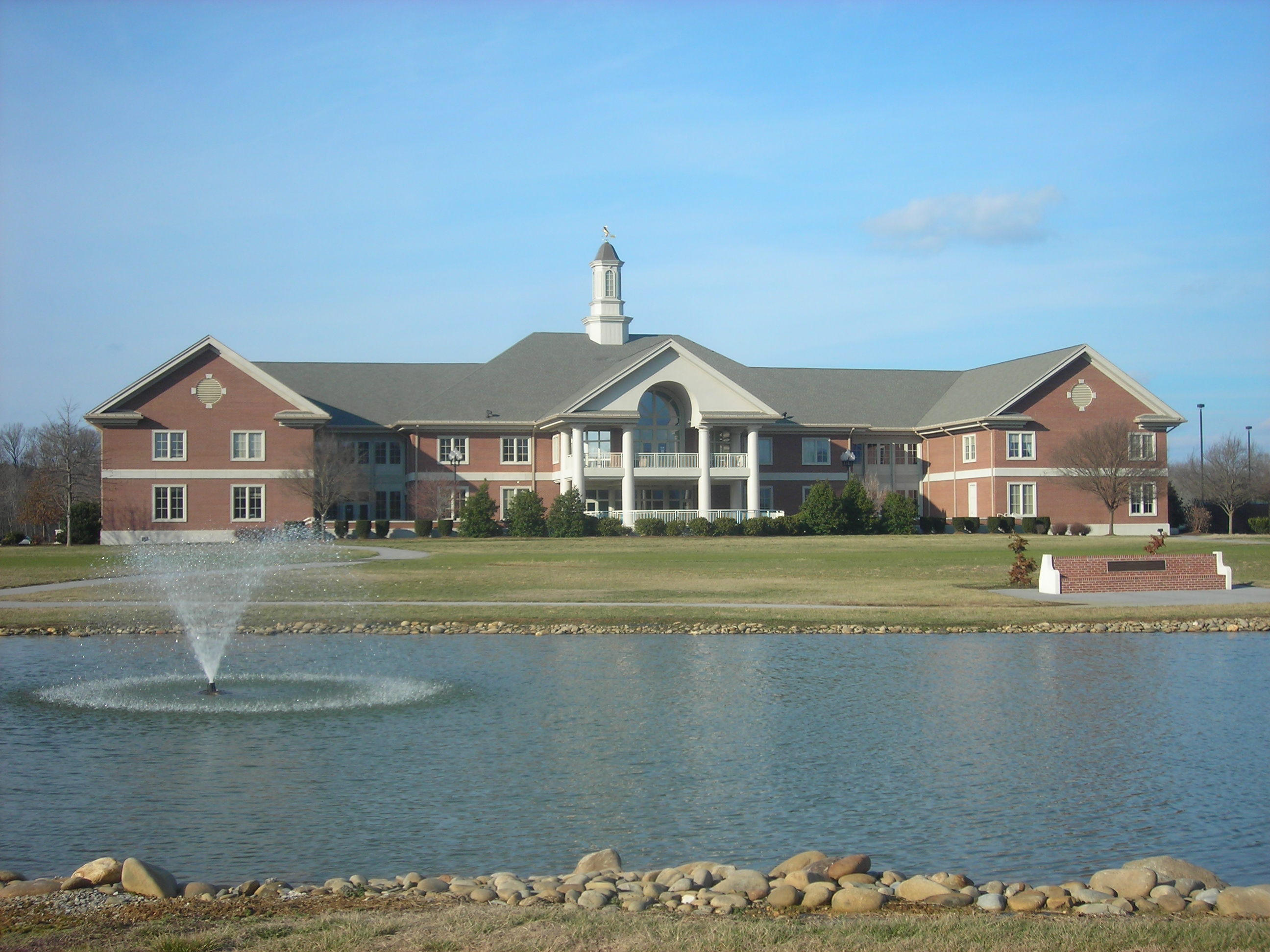
Maples-Marshall Hall on the Sevier County Campus

As its reach extends across a geographically large region, there are four campuses of Walters State Community College. The primary campus is located in Morristown, while satellite branches are found in Sevierville, Greeneville, and New Tazewell. In mid-2010, the Claiborne extension moved into the former Claiborne County High School building. In late 2020, Walters State opened a campus in Cocke County, at the Tanner Building in Newport.

The college has campuses in the following locations:

- Morristown (Main Campus)
- Greeneville (Niswonger Campus)
- New Tazewell-Claiborne County
- Sevierville
- Newport-Cocke County

== Notable alumni ==
- Ben Joyce, professional baseball player
- Dulcy Fankam Mendjiadeu, professional basketball player
- Rodney Atkins, musician
- Chad Bell, professional baseball player
- Tilman Goins, politician
- Michael Harrison, politician
- Brent Honeywell Jr., professional baseball player
- Ryan Kelly, professional baseball player
- Michael K. Locke, politician
- Brett Martin, professional baseball player
- Steve Southerland, politician
- Keith Westmoreland, politician
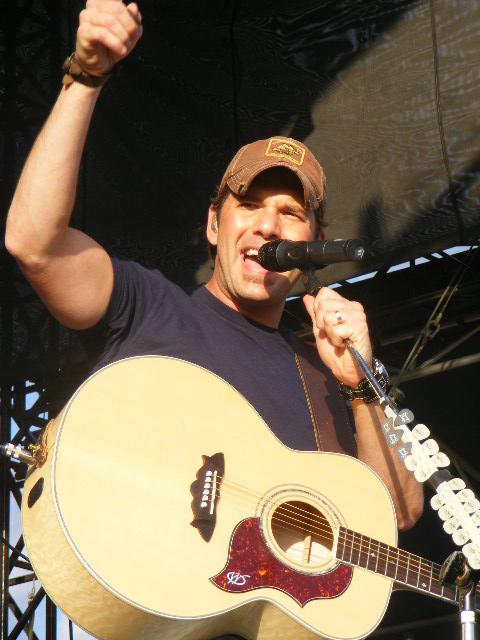
Rodney Atkins in 2009

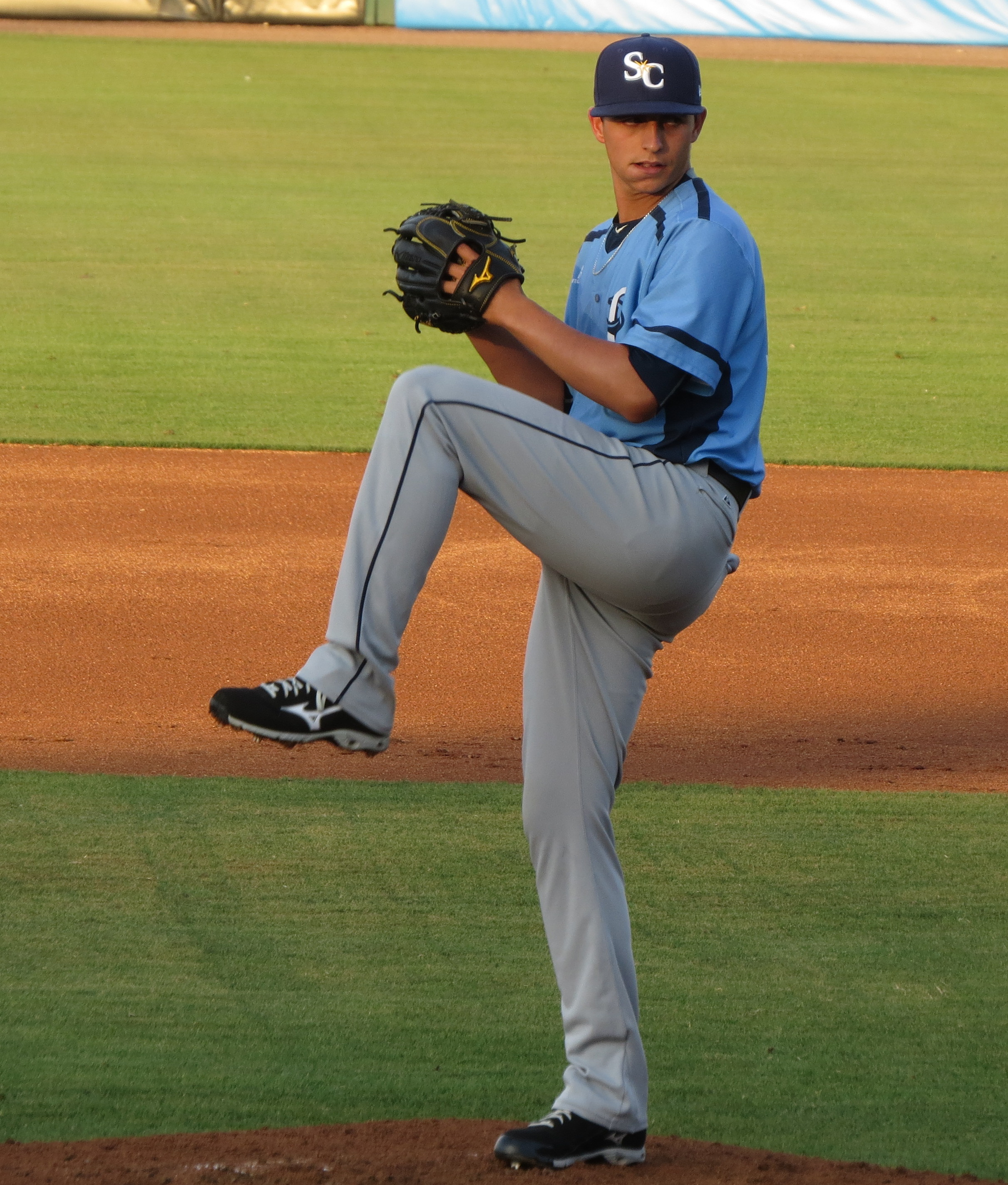
Brent Honeywell in 2016
