= Lorianne Crook =

American radio and television host, producer and writer

- Crook in 2006
- Born: February 19, 1957 (age 69); Wichita, Kansas, U.S.
- Education: McGavock High School
- Occupations: Radio and television personality
- Years active: 1986–present
- Spouse: Jim Owens (m. 1985; died 2022)

Lorianne Crook (born February 19, 1957) is an American radio and television host, producer, and writer, best known for her work on The Nashville Network programs This Week In Country Music and Crook & Chase with Charlie Chase.

== Early life ==
Crook was born in Wichita, Kansas but grew up in Nashville, Tennessee. She is a graduate of McGavock High School in Nashville where she was a cheerleader. She graduated from Vanderbilt University with a Bachelor of Arts degree in Chinese and Russian languages.

== Career ==
An award-winning TV personality, Crook occasionally hosts Offstage with Lorianne Crook, a series of in-depth conversations with major country music artists for Great American Country (GAC). Subjects have included Kenny Chesney, Trace Adkins, Phil Vassar, Cowboy Troy, and Lonestar. For a brief time, she was co-host of Candid Camera. Before her big break as a TV personality, she worked at KAUZ-TV, the CBS affiliate in Wichita Falls, Texas/Lawton, Oklahoma in the 1980s.

== Personal life ==
Crook married television producer Jim Owens in 1985. Owens was the creator of Crook & Chase and through its success, he secured an exclusive contract with TNN to produce its country music and entertainment programming until the network shifted away from the format in 2000. Owens's company Jim Owens Entertainment purchased the rights to the TNN brand and the content he had produced for it in 2012. Crook and Owens were married until his death March 4, 2022.
