= Joseph Rogers (pioneer) =

- Joseph Rogers
- Born: 21 August 1764; County Tyrone, Ireland
- Died: 6 October 1833 (aged 69); Rogersville, Tennessee
- Occupations: Postmaster, settler, tavern keeper
- Known for: Founding Rogersville, Tennessee
- Spouse: Mary Amis

Joseph Rogers (1764–1833) was an Irish-born pioneer and settler who, with his father-in-law Thomas Amis, founded the town of Rogersville, Tennessee in 1789.

== Early life ==
Rogers was born August 21, 1764, near Cookstown, County Tyrone, Ireland, the son of James Rogers and his wife Elizabeth Brown. Rogers emigrated to the British colonies in North America and, after coming down from Philadelphia through Virginia, he ended up, after the American Revolution, travelling to the overmountain area of North Carolina, then known as the State of Franklin. The area was also known as "the Holston country", named for the Holston River which drained it.

== Marriage and settlement ==
By 1785, during a stay at the tavern adjacent to the homestead of Colonel Thomas Amis, a prominent North Carolinian and Revolutionary War hero, Rogers fell in love with the Colonel's daughter, Mary Amis. Rogers married Mary Amis on October 24, 1786, despite Colonel Amis' initial dislike for him. Eventually, the Colonel gave his blessing and ceded his lands near Crockett Spring (named for the grandparents of Davy Crockett, who settled by the spring in 1775) to his son-in-law.

Rogers joined his father-in-law in actively supporting the establishment of the new state of Franklin, and he gained prominence among the Holston country settlers during this time. When North Carolina was considering where to establish the county seat for its new Hawkins County, Rogers successfully lobbied, through the influence of his father-in-law, to have the government located near his home. He even volunteered his tavern, set up around 1784-85, as the first county courthouse in 1787.

== Establishing Rogersville ==
Rogers, with the help of other local settlers, laid out a plan for the town, and the town of Rogersville was chartered by the North Carolina General Assembly in 1789. The plan included a public square, deeded to the town government, in which the town's public well and the county courthouse would be sited.

Rogers was a successful businessman and tavern keeper. In November 1792, he was appointed the first postmaster at Rogersville, and the second post office of Rogersville, built by its founder circa 1815, still stands at the corner of East Main Street and South Hasson Street.

== Death ==
Rogers was the father of fourteen children with Mary. He died on November 6, 1833, at Rogersville, near the hour of midnight. He was buried in Rogers Cemetery, near the founding site of the town. His wife Mary died a month later, the victim, according to legend, of a broken heart at the loss of her beloved Joseph.
