= The Knoxville Gazette =

Knoxville Gazette
- Type: Biweekly newspaper
- Format: Broadsheet
- Founder: George Roulstone
- Publisher: George Roulstone (1791–1804); Robert Ferguson (1791–1793); Elizabeth Gilliam Roulstone (1804–1808); George Wilson (1804–1818) David Lear (2014–)
- Ceased publication: 1808, 1818
- Political alignment: Federalist
- Language: English
- Headquarters: Rogersville, Tennessee (1791–1792); Knoxville, Tennessee (1792–1818)

The Knoxville Gazette was the first newspaper published in the U.S. state of Tennessee and the third published west of the Appalachian Mountains. Established by George Roulstone (1767–1804) at the urging of Southwest Territory governor William Blount, the paper's first edition appeared on November 5, 1791. The Gazette provided an important medium through which Tennessee's frontier government could dispense legislative announcements, and the paper's surviving editions are now an invaluable source of information on life in early Knoxville.

== Layout and publication ==
The Gazette was a typical late-18th century broadsheet consisting of two pages, each with three columns (later four). The first page contained news, while the second page contained advertisements and announcements. The paper typically measured 10 inches (25 cm) by 16 inches (41 cm), but the size varied due to Roulstone's difficulties in obtaining paper. The Gazette was normally published on a biweekly basis.

Roulstone was a native of Boston, Massachusetts, but had moved to Fayetteville, North Carolina, by the late-1780s, where he published an unsuccessful newspaper. Upon the creation of the Southwest Territory (which included what is now Tennessee) in 1790, the territory's first governor, William Blount, saw the need for a newspaper through which the territorial government could announce its legislative decisions, and invited Roulstone to the capital's new territory, Knoxville. Blount and Roulstone spent several months in Rogersville, Tennessee, before moving to Knoxville, and the earliest issues of the Gazette were published in Rogersville. The paper's October 6, 1792 issue was the first published in Knoxville.

Roulstone published the Gazette until his death in 1804. His wife, Elizabeth Gilliam Roulstone, continued publishing the paper until 1808, when she and her second husband moved the paper Carthage, Tennessee. During the same period, George Roulstone's former business partner, George Wilson, moved to Knoxville and established Wilson's Knoxville Gazette, which first appeared in November 1804. Wilson continued publishing this paper until 1818, when he moved to Nashville to publish the pro-Jackson sheet, Old Hickory. Knoxville entrepreneur Frederick Heiskell worked briefly for Wilson's paper before leaving to co-found the Knoxville Register in 1816.

== Notable issues and events ==
The early issues of the Gazette are an invaluable source of information on life in early Knoxville. The paper's December 17, 1791 issue revealed the results of the lottery conducted for lots in the newly-platted city, with Roulstone himself drawing lots 27 (now First Tennessee Plaza) and 40. In the Fall of 1792, the Gazette announced the opening of two of Knoxville's first businesses, the Cowan Brothers' Store and Chisholm's Tavern. The paper's November 17, 1792 issue contained a notice by the city's founder, James White, threatening to prosecute anyone caught cutting timber on the town commons. Early Knoxville architect Thomas Hope placed an advertisement in a 1797 issue of the Gazette offering a reward for the return of some stolen tools.

Native American hostilities were a frequent topic in the Gazette's early issues. The paper gave detailed accounts of attacks such as the Cherokee assault on Cavet's Station in 1793 and the Chickamauga Cherokee attack at Ziegler's Station in 1792. The May 22, 1795 issue contained the provisions of the Treaty of Oneida, which the U.S. had signed several months earlier. In one issue, the Cherokee Chief Red Bird placed a notice in the Gazette warning the chief of the Upper Towns not to disturb William Cocke, for Cocke "talks very strong and runs very fast."

Many events important to the early history of the State of Tennessee were covered by the Gazette. The paper's January 6, 1795 issue contained a notice of the "annual escort" through the wilderness from Southwest Point to Bledsoe's Station, and mentions that construction of the Cumberland Road would commence at that time. Throughout the Summer of 1795, the Gazette published announcements by Blount regarding arrangements for the state's constitutional convention, which took place the following year. A later issue of the Gazette contained a letter from Andrew Jackson accusing John Sevier of fraud, giving insight into the animosity that eventually developed between the two leaders.

== See also ==
- The Rogersville Review
- Early American publishers and printers
