= List of mayors of Rogersville, Tennessee =

The town of Rogersville, Tennessee is governed by a Board of Mayor and Aldermen, authorized under a charter first enacted by the General Assembly of Tennessee in 1836.

== North Carolina Charter, 1786–1836 ==
When Rogersville was first founded, it was as the county seat of Hawkins County, and thus it was called simply Hawkins Court House. The North Carolina General Assembly appointed a Board of Commissioners and Trustees to oversee the town. The legislature appointed the first members of the board. Upon the death, resignation, or removal from the county or state, the board would nominate its own successors.

The first members of the board were:

- Thomas King
- Thomas Hutchins
- Joseph McCulloch
- Thomas Jackson
- Elijah Chissom

== Tennessee incorporation, 1836–present ==
48 years after the town was chartered by the State of North Carolina, the State of Tennessee reincorporated the town in 1835. Following the incorporation, Rogersville was granted an elected Board of Mayor and Aldermen. From 1835 to 1883, the officers served two-year terms. When the town was reincorporated by the General Assembly in 1883 to add new property to the corporate limits, the term of office was changed to four years.

Today, mayors of Rogersville serve four-year terms and are eligible to re-election without term limits.

Rogersville's current mayor, Jim Sells, has been re-elected every four years since 1977.

== List of mayors ==
Following is a list of the mayors of Rogersville:

Mayor	Term
Nicholas Fain	1836–1838
Dicks Alexander	1838–1840
Stockley D. Mitchell	1840–1846
Robert C. Crawford	1846–1850
William White	1852–1854, 1870–1874
Henry G. Wax	1854–1856
James Pace	1856–1860
James K. Neill	1860–1866
Lewis L. Poates, V	1866–1870
Hugh G. Kyle	1874–1876
A.D. Huffmaster	1876–1880
John Hasson	1880–1884
Henry J. Nelson	1884–1890, 1896–1898
Samuel L. Chesnutt	1890–1894, 1898–1902
Charles M. Harris	1902–1904
William Pierce	1904–1906, 1910–1912
S.F. Powel	1906–1908
E.T. Bettis	1908–1909
Rod Armstrong	1909–1910
Gale P. Kyle	1912–1918, 1922–1924
Fred J. Testerman	1918–1922
J.A. Holston	1924–1926
Roy A. Doty	1926–1932
W.B. Hale, Jr.	1932–1934
James S. Lyons	1934–1948
Lon Bible	1948–1952
J.O. Phillips, Jr.	1952–1954
C.C. Johnson	1954–1956, 1958–1960
Judson J. Harmon	1956–1958
William F. Phipps	1960–1966
W. Henry Lyons	1966–1967
Reid Terry	1967–1973
Charles Dennis	1973–1975
Clyde Willis	1975–1977
Jim Sells	1977–present
