= Clinch School =

Public school in Hawkins County, Tennessee, US

Coordinates: 36.4760°N 83.1149°W

- Hawkins County, Tennessee; United States

Information
- School district: Hawkins County School District
- Grades: PreK-12

Clinch School is a public PreK-12 school in unincorporated Hawkins County, Tennessee, with a Sneedville postal address. It is part of the Hawkins County School District.

The school is on the north portion of Clinch Mountain, on what Gregory Leaming of The Kingsport Times-News described as the "far side".

== History ==
In 1980 the Hawkins County school board voted 6–1 to end Clinch School's high school component. A group of parents opposed this due to school transportation taking mountain roads, with a 20 miles (32 km) per direction. The bus route was to go around Clinch Mountain, to the point where the duration of the trip would exceed the requirement in state law that bus rides may only be 1.5 hours long.

For the 1980–1981 school year, the high school component had closed, with the students redirected to Cherokee High. However, shortly after the start of that school year, the Clinch high school reopened and Clinch High de-consolidated from Cherokee High. Around 70 students were affected.

In 1992 a member of the parent-teacher organization of the school asked for more support from the county board of trustees, arguing the school had been "benignly neglected".

The current Clinch School building opened in 2010. It was to be built for $9,800,000, but the district saved money, instead spending $9,550,000.

In February 2019 the school adopted a four-day school week after landslides occurred, making it the only school in Tennessee to have such a schedule. The principal and teachers quoted in a WBIR-TV article supported the change. In January 2020 it was still on a four-day school week. In February 2020 the board of trustees expressed support for continuing the arrangement.
