= Ralph Emery =

American disc jockey and television host (1933–2022)

- Born: Walter Ralph Emery; March 10, 1933; McEwen, Tennessee, U.S.
- Died: January 15, 2022 (aged 88) Nashville, Tennessee, U.S.
- Genres: Country, Nashville sound
- Occupations: Disc jockey, television host
- Years active: 1955–2015
- Labels: Liberty, RCA Records
- Formerly of: Skeeter Davis, Tex Ritter

Walter Ralph Emery (March 10, 1933 – January 15, 2022) was an American country music disc jockey, radio and television host from McEwen, Tennessee.

Emery promoted numerous stars on his radio and TV shows, and was called the Dick Clark of country music.

He gained national fame hosting the syndicated television music series, Pop! Goes the Country, from 1974 to 1980 and the nightly Nashville Network television program, Nashville Now, from 1983 to 1993. From 2007 to 2015, Emery hosted the weekly program, Ralph Emery Live, on RFD-TV, a satellite and cable television channel devoted to rural American culture.

== Life and career ==
Walter Ralph Emery worked as an usher in a downtown Nashville movie theater and as a Kroger stock boy as a teenager, saving money to attend the Tennessee School of Broadcasting under the instruction of Nashville disc jockey John Richbourg. He first earned fame as the late-night disc jockey on Nashville's WSM. Due to the powerful signal of the clear-channel station at night, Emery's country music show could be heard over most of the Eastern and Central U.S. – and by many overnight long-haul truck drivers, who were often fans of country music. The all-night show was a mecca for country music stars of all kinds, many of whom were personal friends of Emery. One in particular was singer and movie star, and Nashville resident, Tex Ritter, who co-hosted the show with Emery for a while. Well-known stars, most notably Marty Robbins, would often drop in unannounced. Emery later wrote several best-selling books chronicling his memories of the many Nashville singers and musicians that appeared on his various radio and TV shows. The second of Emery's three wives was Opry star Skeeter Davis.

He hosted a late-afternoon program on WSM-TV in the late 1960s, Sixteenth Avenue South (named for one of the streets on Nashville's Music Row of recording studios), with the same format. Owing to the morning show's popularity and demands on his time, Emery ended his long run on the overnight shift on WSM radio in 1972; Hairl Hensley replaced him and went on to a thirty-year career with the station. In 1971, Emery began hosting his eponymous radio show, a weekly, syndicated show that aired daily on country stations in five parts Mondays through Fridays; it lasted until the 1980s. From the mid-1960s until the early 1990s (except for several years in the 1960s when hosted by country singer Bobby Lord and a two-year period between 1970 and 1972), Emery also hosted a weekday morning show, Opry Almanac (later dubbed The Ralph Emery Show), on WSMV, which featured an in-studio band of local session musicians and aspiring singers (including The Judds and Lorrie Morgan), along with news and weather updates and in-studio live commercials. It became the highest-rated local morning television program in the U.S. for some years in the 1970s and 1980s. His eye and ear for talent was inclusive in breaking color barriers and started the careers of younger African-American singers such as J.P.Netters, who was included as a part of his studio band in the early 1980s.

The song "Drug Store Truck Drivin' Man" details an unpleasant on-air exchange between Emery, Roger McGuinn and Gram Parsons of the 1960s rock group The Byrds, concerning their 1968 appearance at The Grand Ole Opry. In that performance, the Byrds attempted unsuccessfully to convince traditional country music fans that their sound was a legitimate part of the country rock tradition but were met with jeers and catcalls. Years later, there was some reconciliation and even convergence of the opposing styles in the "Outlaw" movement, popularized by performers like Willie Nelson and Waylon Jennings.

In 2001, Emery attempted a television comeback on Nashville Fox affiliate WZTV, with a show called Mornings with Ralph Emery, but only spent seven days on the air before being sidelined first by continuing coverage of the September 11 attacks and then an illness. The show continued with replacement host Charlie Chase, using the title Tennessee Mornings. In October 2005, Emery launched The Nashville Show, a free weekly webcast with Shotgun Red as co-host. He then returned to television on the RFD-TV cable network in mid-2007, conducting interviews on the show Ralph Emery Live. The show aired live every Monday evening at 7:00 PM Eastern. The show ran for eight years, at some point changing its name to Ralph Emery's Memories, ending its run in October 2015.

== Honors ==
Emery was among the 2007 inductees to the Country Music Hall of Fame, and in 2010 he was inducted into the National Radio Hall of Fame.

== Death ==
Emery died at a hospital in Nashville on January 15, 2022, at the age of 88, after a brief illness.

== Albums ==
- 1989 Songs for Children (with Shotgun Red) (RCA Records)

== Singles ==
Year	Single	US Country
1961	"Hello Fool"	4
