= WRGS =

- Rogersville, Tennessee; United States
- Frequency: 1370 kHz
- Branding: Hometown Radio

Programming
- Format: Classic country

Ownership
- Owner: Roger Bouldin; (Bouldin Radio, LLC)

History
- First air date: August 1954; 71 years ago
- Call sign meaning: Rogersville

Technical information
- Licensing authority: FCC
- Facility ID: 73944
- Class: D
- Power: 1,000 watts day 40 watts night
- Transmitter coordinates: 36°24′58.00″N 82°59′4.00″W
- Repeater: W233BP (94.5 FM)

Links
- Public license information: Public file; LMS
- Website: wrgsradio.com

WRGS (1370 AM, "Hometown Radio") is a radio station broadcasting a southern gospel and classic country music format. Licensed to Rogersville, Tennessee, United States, the station is currently owned by Roger Bouldin, through licensee Bouldin Radio, LLC.

== Swap Shop ==
Swap Shop is a tradio radio program first aired in 1957 on 94.5 WRGS. It is known for providing a platform for listeners to buy, sell, or trade their personal goods, while also featuring conversations between the participants. Swap Shop has gained worldwide attention due to its Netflix series adaptation.

=== Broadcast and Format ===
The show airs every morning at 9:35 a.m. and continues until the calls cease, usually lasting around 90 minutes. Businesses sponsor segments of the program daily. Swap Shop's jingle was written and recorded by Larry Fritts of the Fritts Family Band.

=== Netflix Series ===
The Netflix series, sharing the same name as the radio program, premiered its first season on November 9, 2021. Produced by Rob Shaftel and Jerry Carita, each episode runs for approximately 30 minutes. It showcases buyers who usually plan to resell the items they purchase at a higher price. The show is characterized by healthy competition and sometimes friendly drama between contestants. Viewers experience the excitement and frustration of the buyers as they try to secure deals while facing challenges like traffic and unforeseen obstacles. Swap Shop's second season was released on February 16, 2022.
