= Michael Harrison (politician) =

American politician (born 1958)

Member of the Tennessee House of Representatives from the 9th district
- In office January 14, 2003 – December 2015
- Preceded by: Ken Givens
- Succeeded by: Gary Hicks

Personal details
- Born: September 9, 1958 (age 68)
- Party: Republican
- Spouse: Nikki Harrison
- Children: 3
- Education: Walters State Community College (AA); East Tennessee State University (BA)
- Website: House website

Michael Harrison (born September 9, 1958) is an American politician who served as a member of the Tennessee House of Representatives for the 9th district from 2003 to 2015.

== Early life and education ==
Harrison was born on September 9, 1958. He attended Walters State Community College and East Tennessee State University.

== Career ==
A member of the Republican Party, he was elected to the 103rd and 104th General Assembly. During his tenure, he served on the Finance, Ways and Means, Health and Human Resource, Health Care Facilities, Budget, and Joint TennCare Oversight Committees.

Prior to his career in politics, Harrison worked in the healthcare industry. In addition to serving in the Tennessee House of Representatives, Harrison served as a sessions judge and Executive of Hancock County, Tennessee. Harrison resigned from the House in 2015 to become the Executive Director of the Association of County Mayors of Tennessee. He was succeeded by computer programmer Gary Hicks.

Harrison currently serves as Executive Director of the First Tennessee Development District in Johnson City, TN.
