= Rogersville City Schools =

Rogersville City School
- United States

Information
- Type: Public
- Established: 1923
- School district: Rogersville City Schools
- Grades: K-8
- Campus type: Suburban
- Colors: Red, White, and Black
- Athletics: Interscholastic, Tennessee Middle School Athletics Association
- Mascot: Warriors
- Feeder to: Cherokee High School
- Website: http://www.rcschool.net/

Rogersville City School or Rogersville City Schools is a school district headquartered in Rogersville, Tennessee. It operates one K-8 school, Rogersville Elementary School. The district's boundary parallels that of the municipality of Rogersville, and high school students move on to Hawkins County School District.

== History ==
The school counts 1923 as the year of its establishment. The school building was established on the site of the former King College for $125,000. A 1928 fire destroyed that building, so a $65,178 building opened in 1929. The school district described it as "almost an exact duplicate of the 1923 school."

Grades K-12 were in one facility until 1950, when a new Rogersville High School opened. The Rogersville Review stated in 1950 that, prior to the split, the school building was "overcrowded".

In 1955 a 14,000-square-foot (1,300 m^{2}) addition, called the West Wing, opened, built for $122,380. Another such addition, 20,656 square feet (1,919.0 m^{2}) in size, called the East Wing, opened in 1970, built for $366,542.

Rebecca Isaacs became superintendent in 2011, and by 2019 planned to resign in 2020; the board of trustees used Wayne Qualls as a consultant to look for another superintendent.

J.T. Stroder became the director circa 2020, then resigned in 2021 citing reasons not related to the job.

In 2024 the board of trustees asked Edwin Jarnigan to become the superintendent.

== Academic performance ==
In 2019 Jeff Bobo of the Times News wrote that, including the 2017–2018 school year, Rogersville School had a "long history of high academic performance".

== Transportation ==
Prior to 1980, students attending the school who did not live in the city limits of Rogersville were permitted to take county school district-run buses. Beginning in 1980 the county school district nixed the practice.
