= The Rogersville Review =

Newspaper in Rogersville, Tennessee

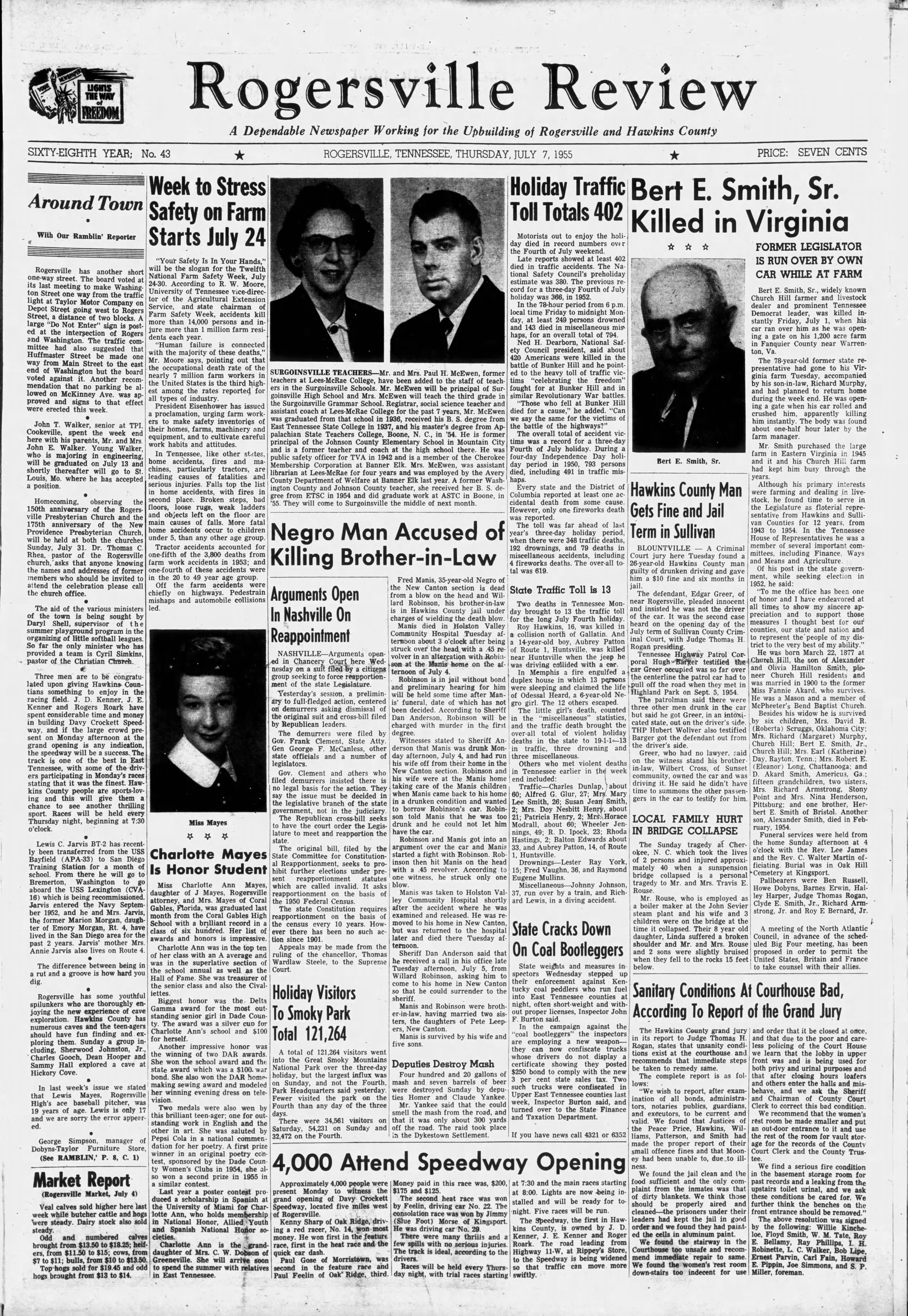
- A representative front page of the Review in July 1955
- Type: Twice weekly newspaper
- Owner: Adams MultiMedia
- Editor: John Cate
- Founded: July 23, 1885
- City: Rogersville, Tennessee
- Circulation: 3,500 (as of 2019)
- OCLC number: 19134284
- Website: therogersvillereview.com

The Rogersville Review is a twice-weekly newspaper publishing in Rogersville, Tennessee, United States.

== History ==
=== The Knoxville Gazette ===
George Roulstone and Robert Ferguson were the first newspaper publishers in Rogersville and in the state of Tennessee. Roulstone and Ferguson were commissioned by Territorial Governor William Blount to bring the first printing press to the new territory. The two men brought a printing press over the mountains from North Carolina and established The Knoxville Gazette in a log cabin on the Hawkins Courthouse Town Square.

The first issue of the state's first paper came off the press on November 5, 1791. A year later, in October 1792, the publication was moved to Knoxville, the home of Blount's newly established territorial capital.

Since then, numerous newspapers and special publications have emanated from Rogersville. After the Gazette was moved, there was no newspaper in the area for more than 20 years. In 1813, John B. Hood began publishing the East Tennessee Gazette. Other papers followed, including the Western Pilot, circa 1815, and the Rogersville Gazette from the same era.

Specialty publications emerged during these early days, including the Rail-Road Advocate, the Calvinistic Magazine and the Holston Watchman.

Numerous other newspapers have been published in Rogersville over the years, most surviving only a short time and having modest circulation. Among them were:

- The Independent
- Rogersville Spectator
- The Weekly Reporter
- The Rogersville Gazette
- Rogersville Press and Times
- Holston Journal
- Hawkins County Republican
- Hawkins County Telephone
- The Rogersville Herald
- Hawkins County Free Press

=== The Review ===
The Rogersville Review was founded in 1885 by William T. Robertson. At first, Robertson called his new publication The Holston Review, but he soon changed the name to The Rogersville Review, and the paper has been continuously published under that banner ever since. The Review was the first hot metal newspaper in Tennessee and was also the last such letter press, weekly paper when the conversion to "cold type" was made in July 1981.

=== Competition ===
The only newspaper which competed with the Review for dominance in the Hawkins County market was The Rogersville Herald. The Herald was published from 1886 to 1932, outliving all other local papers save for the Review.

During the 1970s, another newspaper offered competition for the Review. The Hawkins County Free Press was published until 1982, when its subscription list was bought by the publishers of the Review.

== Publishers ==
Throughout its history The Rogersville Review has undergone numerous changes and countless challenges. Each publisher made a different contribution to the publication and placed their own mark on its pages and in its history.

=== Eleanor Sheets ===
The most distinguished and perhaps most remembered of all those publishers was Eleanor L. Sheets. In 1932, Major George L. Berry, who owned the newspaper, hired Eleanor and her husband J. Fred Sheets, along with Spurgeon Akers, to run the newspaper. In 1947, the Sheets purchased the paper from Berry. Fred Sheets died in 1958, leaving his widow to run the paper. Eleanor Sheets was a mainstay in Tennessee journalism for six decades. She was a part of the Review for 53 years. She continued to publish the paper until the time of her death, July 18, 1985, in the centenary year of the newspaper.

=== The Sheets heirs and Jones Newspapers ===
Her heirs, Lace Hoyt Stevens and W. Andes Hoyt, then began publishing the weekly. In early 1988, The Rogersville Review was sold to the Jones Newspaper Group, headed by Gregg Jones of Greeneville. One month later Doug Morris was named editor and publisher. Morris published the paper until 1990.

=== Ellen Addison Myatt ===
In October of that same year, Ellen Addison was named publisher and continued in that role until 1997 when she assumed the helm at the Tri-Cities Business Journal. During her tenure at the Review, Addison turned the weekly into a twice-weekly newspaper publishing the traditional midweek edition and the new weekend edition. She returned to publish the newspaper in 2006 through 2008.

=== Kevin Burcham ===
In April 1997, Kevin L. Burcham moved to Rogersville and took the reins of the newspaper as editor and publisher. The paper then began publishing on the internet. While the paper went online in 1997, in January 1998, Burcham unveiled a new expanded and updated site, Hawkins County On-line. The website features general news information, links to weather, industrial and tourism information, a classified section and obituaries. It is a part of a network of similar sites in the Tri-Cities, Greeneville, Morristown, Newport, Lenoir City, Sweetwater, Athens and other communities throughout Northeast Tennessee.

=== Bill Parsons ===
Publisher Bill Parsons took the helm in January 2001, bringing with him what has become The Rogersville Review's premier special edition, the annual "A Place Called Home" section, which has received state and national awards, along with accolades throughout the community.

"A Place Called Home" has been recognized by the Tennessee Press Association as the best special edition in the state for several years for both editorial and advertising content. The section was also recognized by the National Press Association as third best special section in the United States in 2002 and the second best in 2003.

== Modernizing ==
In 1999, the Review moved to a new, state-of-the-art facility located on the historic Main Street of downtown Rogersville. The new facility is equipped with computers, scanners, laser printers, digital cameras and modern newspaper equipment.

=== Awards ===
In 2002, The Review received its highest honor in its 120-plus-year history, the Tennessee Press Association's General Excellence Award for community newspapers.
