= Cherokee High School (Tennessee) =

Location
- 2927 Highway 66; Rogersville, Tennessee; United States
- Coordinates: 36.3543°N 83.02123°W

Information
- Type: Senior high school
- Established: 1980
- School district: Hawkins County School System
- Principal: David Kenner
- Grades: 9–12
- Enrollment: 1,002 (2024–2025)
- Colors: Red and black
- Athletics: TSSAA District 2 AAA (5A/football)
- Nickname: Chiefs
- ACT average: 18.8
- Yearbook: Keetoowah
- Fight song: "War Chant"
- Website: http://cherokee.hck12.net
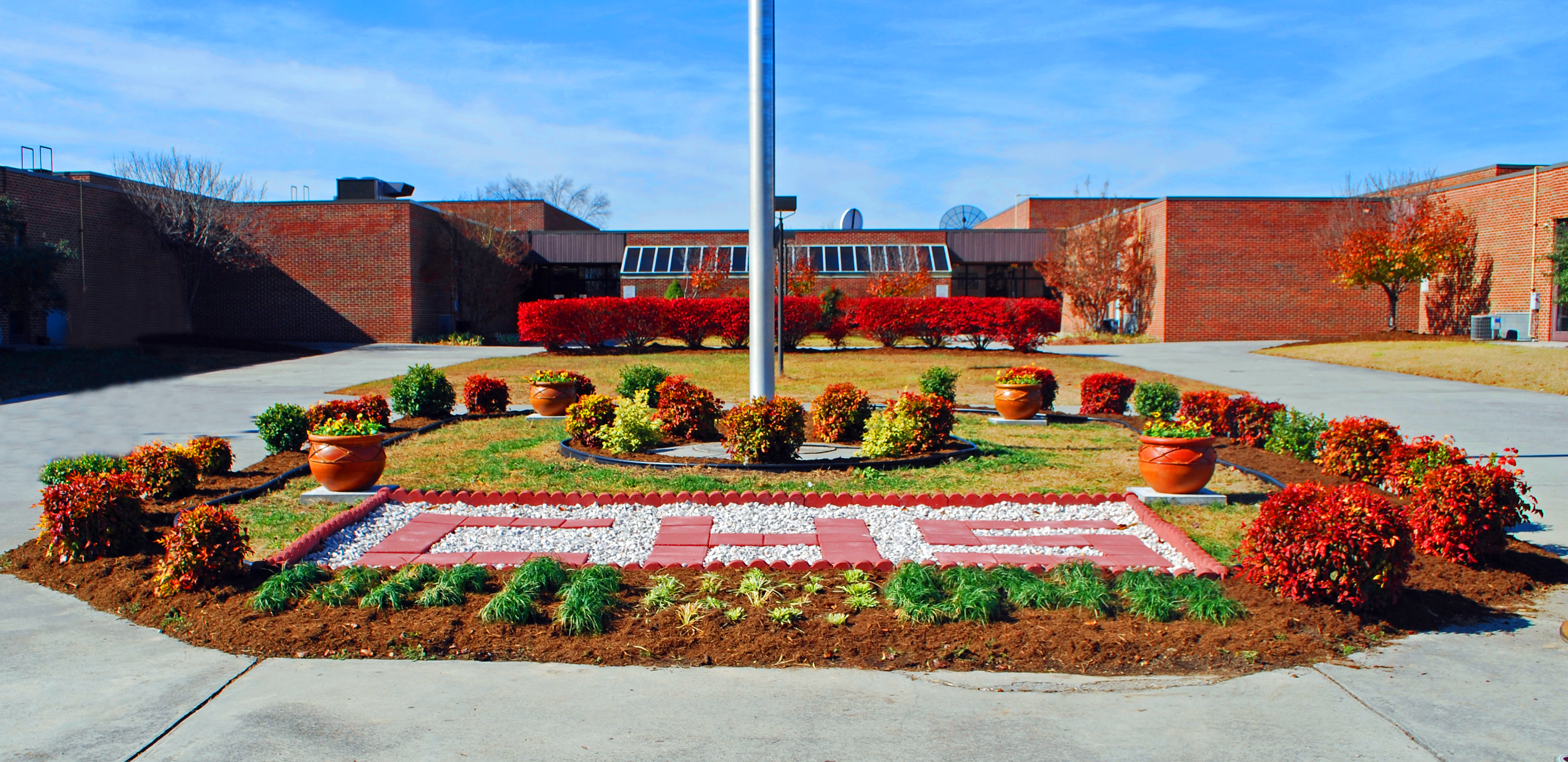

Cherokee High School, also known as Cherokee Comprehensive High School, is a secondary school within the Hawkins County School System within Persia, unincorporated Hawkins County, Tennessee, United States, near Rogersville.

== History ==
Cherokee High School was founded in 1980 after the Hawkins County Board of Education had determined in the mid-1970s that it would be more cost effective for the school system to construct and operate two comprehensive high schools rather than the four community-based high schools it was then operating. The two schools would be centered in the western and eastern ends of the county, to service the county's two main population centers: Rogersville-Bulls Gap- Mooresburg and Church Hill-Mount Carmel-Surgoinsville.

The initial choice for the first principal chose not to take the job, so Ralph Anderson, the former superintendent of the county school district, was chosen. The proposed name for the school was Clear View High School, but dissatisfaction among students prompted the district to choose another name.

The same population was being served by Rogersville High School and Bulls Gap High School prior to Cherokee's construction. So that these populations would still be served under the new plan, the Board of Education purchased land as equidistant from Rogersville and Bulls Gap as possible. The present site is located at the intersection of Highway 66 and Highway 70 in the community of Persia. For the 1980-1981 school year, the high school component of Clinch School, a K-12 school, had closed, with the students redirected to Cherokee High. However, shortly after the start of that school year, the Clinch high school reopened and Clinch High de-consolidated from Cherokee High.

The school was named after nearby Cherokee Lake.

The high school added a freshman academy program in 2009.

== Student demographics ==
According to a 2018–2019 report card from the Tennessee Department of Education, approximately 38.3% of Cherokee High students were considered to be "economically disadvantaged", as that term is defined by the Department. The same report indicates that, for 2018–2019, the student population was 51.7% male and (1077 total) Cherokee was distributed as follows:

Race	Number	Percentage
White	1006	93.4 %
African American	25	2.3%
Hispanic	35	3.2%
Native American/Alaskan	4	0.4%
Asian	7	0.6%
Other	0	0.0%

== Academics ==
According to information from a 2017–18 Tennessee Report Card, Cherokee students averaged 18.8 on the ACT. The report also states that attendance was 93.0% for 2017–18 and the 2017 graduation rate was 96.9%. In the decade after 2007, graduation rates rose over 34%.

== Athletics ==
The former Rogersville High School practice field was the initial home game center for Cherokee High teams.

The school's mascot was derived from the old Rogersville High Warriors; its colors were taken from the orange and black of the old Bulls Gap High and the maroon and grey of the old Rogersville, to derive the red and black Cherokee Chiefs. Men's and women's varsity, junior varsity, and freshman teams compete in the Tennessee Secondary School Athletics Association Division I in the following classifications:

Sport	Classification (2017–2021)	Conference opponents
Football	Class AAAAA Region 1 There are 6 classes in Tennessee, with 8 regions per class.	Cherokee High School (Rogersville) Cocke County High School (Newport) Daniel Boone High School (Gray) David Crockett High School (Jonesborough) Morristown-Hamblen High School East (Morristown) Tennessee High School (Bristol) Volunteer High School (Church Hill)
Basketball Baseball Softball	Class AA Region 1 District 1 Districts 1 and 2 create Region 1. There are 3 classes in Tennessee.	Cherokee High School (Rogersville) Daniel Boone High School (Gray) David Crockett High School (Jonesborough) Dobyns Bennett High School (Kingsport) Science Hill High School (Johnson City) Tennessee High School (Bristol) Volunteer High School (Church Hill)
Cross country	Large Division Region 1 (23 teams) IMAC Conference There are small and large divisions, and 8 regions in Tennessee.	Cherokee High School (Rogersville) Cocke County High School (Newport) Jefferson County High School (Dandridge) Morristown-Hamblen High School East (Morristown) Morristown-Hamblen High School West (Morristown) Sevier County High School (Sevierville) Seymour High School (Seymour) South Doyle High School (Knoxville)
Track & field	Large Division Section 1 (43 teams) IMAC Conference There are small and large divisions, and 4 sections in Tennessee.	Cherokee High School (Rogersville) Cocke County High School (Newport) Jefferson County High School (Dandridge) Morristown-Hamblen High School East (Morristown) Morristown-Hamblen High School West (Morristown) Sevier County High School (Sevierville) Seymour High School (Seymour) South Doyle High School (Knoxville)
Golf Tennis	Large Division Region 1 (districts 1 & 2) District 1 (11 teams) IMAC Conference There are small and large divisions in Tennessee.	Cherokee High School (Rogersville) Cocke County High School (Newport) Jefferson County High School (Dandridge) Morristown-Hamblen High School East (Morristown) Morristown-Hamblen High School West (Morristown) Sevier County High School (Sevierville) Seymour High School (Seymour) South Doyle High School (Knoxville)
Soccer	Class AA Region 2 (districts 3 & 4) District 3 (5 teams) There are 3 classes in Tennessee.	
Volleyball	Class AAA Region 1 (districts 1 & 2) District 2 (5 teams) There are 3 classes in Tennessee, with 8 regions per class.	
Bowling	Region 1 There are 8 regions in Tennessee.	
Wrestling	Class AAA Region 1 (districts 1 & 2) District 1 (6 teams) In a co-op with Volunteer High.	
Swimming	Not a TSSAA sanctioned sport. Cherokee High is in a co-op with Volunteer High in swimming.	

== References in Popular Culture and Media ==
Cherokee High School is one of the locations in the novel series "The Living Saga" by Jaron McFall.
