= Ronald E. Brooks =

American Army general during the Cold War

Major General Ronald Edward Brooks
- Born: September 12, 1937; Rogersville, Tennessee, U.S.
- Died: March 22, 2018 (aged 80); Indianapolis, Indiana, U.S.
- Burial place: McKinney Cemetery; Rogersville, Tennessee
- Military career
- Branch: United States Army
- Service years: 1957–1995
- Rank: Major General (USA)
- Nickname: Ron
- Commands: 1st Aviation Brigade; U.S. Army Personnel Information Systems Command; U.S. Army Soldier Support Center; Fort Benjamin Harrison
- Other work: Executive Director, American Legion

Ronald Edward Brooks (September 12, 1937 – March 22, 2018) was a career United States Army General Officer during the Cold War, commanding personnel and logistics of the American occupation of West Germany and later serving as executive director of the American Legion.

He died in Indianapolis, Indiana in 2018, and is buried in his hometown of Rogersville.
