= Ken Givens =

American politician (born 1947)

34th Commissioner of Agriculture of Tennessee
- In office January 18, 2003 – January 15, 2011
- Governor: Phil Bredesen
- Preceded by: John W. Rose
- Succeeded by: Julius Thomas Johnson

Tennessee Representative for the Ninth State House District
- In office January 1989 – May 2002
- Preceded by: Bruce Hurley
- Succeeded by: Mike Harrison

Personal details
- Born: October 1, 1947 (age 79) Rogersville, Tennessee, USA
- Party: Democratic Party
- Education: East Tennessee State University
- Profession: Farmer, real estate

Ken Givens (born October 10, 1947) is a Tennessee politician from Rogersville, Tennessee. From 1988 to 2002, Givens was a member of the Tennessee House of Representatives representing the Ninth State House District. In 2003, he was appointed by Governor Phil Bredesen to be the 34th Commissioner of Agriculture of Tennessee, a Cabinet-level position in the gubernatorial administration responsible for overseeing the Tennessee Department of Agriculture.

== Personal life ==
Givens was born in Rogersville, Tennessee, in 1947 to tobacco and dairy cattle farmers from Hawkins County. He attended Rogersville City School and Rogersville High School, graduating from high school in 1965. Givens served in the United States Army, from which he was honorably discharged.

Givens is married to Cynthia Bundren Jackson.

Givens operates a tobacco and cattle farm in Hawkins County and was involved in real estate in Rogersville and northeast Tennessee.

== Legislative career ==
In 1988, Givens was elected to the 96th General Assembly as the Democratic Representative for the Ninth State House District, which is presently composed of Hancock County and part of Hawkins County.

Givens served in the 96th through the 102nd General Assemblies, elected to seven two-year terms. In 1997, Givens was appointed chairman of the Agriculture Committee in the Tennessee House, a position which he held for the rest of his time in the General Assembly.

Givens retired from the General Assembly in 2002 after fourteen years of service.

== Cabinet service ==
In 2003, Governor Phil Bredesen, a Democrat, appointed Givens to be the 34th Commissioner of Agriculture of Tennessee.

As Commissioner of Agriculture, Givens had direct oversight of the Tennessee Department of Agriculture. He was an ex officio, voting member of Board of Trustees of the University of Tennessee, the Board of Regents of the State University and Community College System of Tennessee, and the Tennessee Wildlife Resources Commission.

In 2004, Governor Bredesen appointed Givens to chair the Governor's Task Force on Methamphetamine Abuse. Givens was also appointed to the Tennessee Homeland Security Council, which advised the Governor on state-wide security concerns.
