= Nashville Now =

American TV talk/variety program

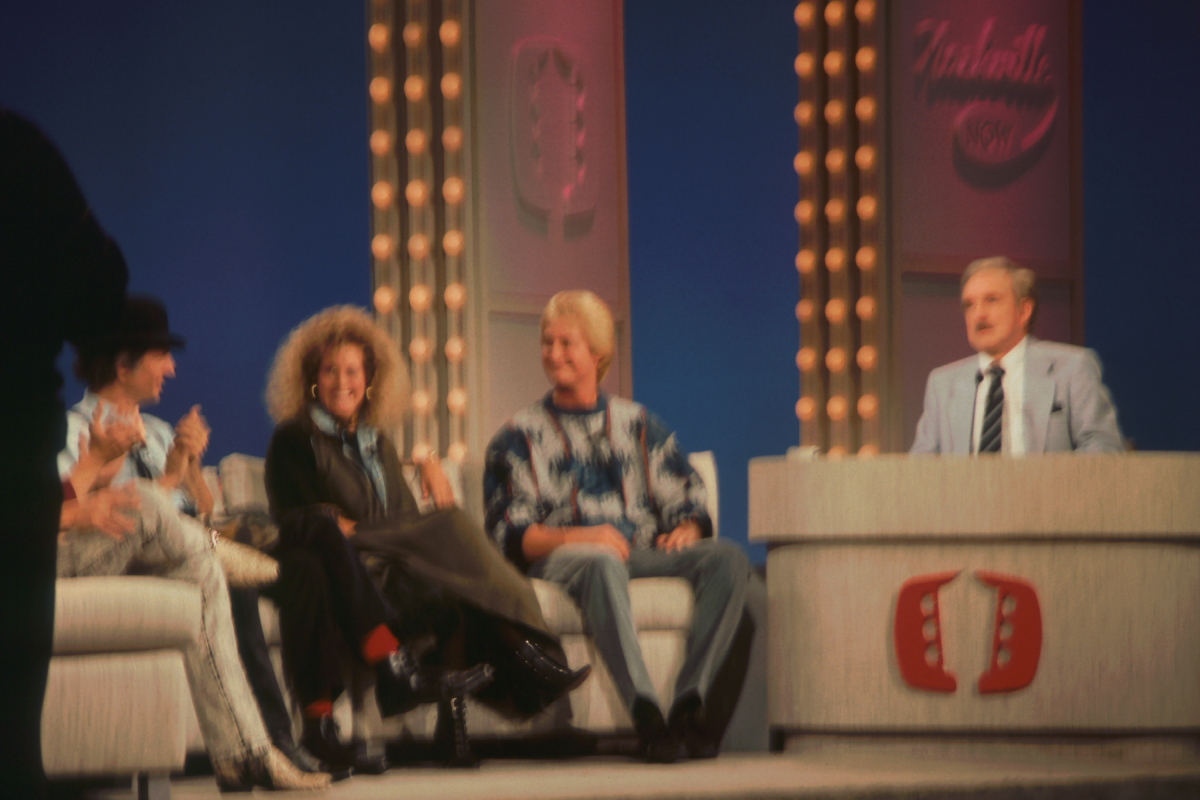
- Host Ralph Emery with guests
- Genre: Talk show/Variety show
- Presented by: Ralph Emery
- Narrated by: Gary Beaty
- Theme music composer: Jerry Whitehurst
- Country of origin: United States
- Original language: English

Production
- Production locations: Opryland USA; Nashville, Tennessee
- Camera setup: Multi-camera
- Running time: 45–48 minutes

Original release
- Network: The Nashville Network
- Release: March 7, 1983 – October 15, 1993

Nashville Now is an American talk show that focused on country music performers in the style of The Tonight Show. The show aired live on weeknights on TNN from 1983 to 1993. The program was hosted by Nashville TV and radio personality Ralph Emery and featured performances and interviews with country music artists and other celebrities. The show was nominated for an ACE Award in 1987 for Music Series. Emery's sidekick was Shotgun Red, a puppet performed by Steve Hall. It originated from TNN's studio ("Gaslight Theater") at Opryland USA in Nashville, which was demolished after suffering heavy damage in the 2010 Tennessee floods.

Reruns of Nashville Now were added to the relaunched Nashville Network on November 1, 2012. The show is now jointly owned by Viacom and the Country Music Hall of Fame and Museum in Nashville.
