= Hawkins County School District =

School district in Tennessee, United States

Address
- 200 North Depot Street Rogersville, Tennessee, 37857; United States

District information
- Type: Public
- Grades: PK–12
- Schools: 17
- NCES District ID: 4701740

Students and staff
- Students: 6,037 (2024–2025)

Other information
- Website: www.hck12.net

Hawkins County School District, also known as Hawkins County School System or Hawkins County Schools (HCS), is a school district headquartered in Rogersville, Tennessee.

Rogersville
- Interactive map of Rogersville
- Coordinates: 36°24′0″N 83°00′00″W
- State: Tennessee
- County: Hawkins

The district includes most areas in Hawkins County, with the exceptions of portions in Kingsport (which are in Kingsport City Schools). The district's jurisdiction includes only high school grades within the municipality of Rogersville; residents there are zoned to Rogersville City School for grades Pre-Kindergarten through 8.

== Transportation ==
Prior to 1980, students attending Rogersville City School who did not live in the city limits of Rogersville were permitted to take county school district-run buses. Beginning in 1980 the county school district nixed the practice.

In 1980, the district permitted elementary school students attending a school other than where they were zoned to ride school buses to those schools, but this was to be phased out beginning in the 1981–1982 school year for kindergarten students, with the phase-out continuing by each grade level.

== Schools ==
K-12 schools:

- Clinch School

High schools:

- Cherokee High School
- Volunteer High School

PK-8 schools:

- Bulls Gap School

Middle schools:

- Church Hill Middle School (Grades 5–8)
- Rogersville Middle School (Grades 6–8)
- Surgoinsville Middle School (Grades 5–8)

Elementary Schools:

- Carter's Valley Elementary School (K-4)
- Church Hill Elementary School (K-4)
- Hawkins Elementary School (3–5)
- Mooresburg Elementary School (K-5)
- Mt. Carmel Elementary School (PK-4)
- Joseph Rogers Primary School (PK-2)
- St. Clair Elementary School (K-5)
- Surgoinsville Elementary School (K-4)
