= TNN (American TV channel) =

US cable television network

The Nashville Network (1983–1998) TNN (1998–2000)
- Headquarters: Nashville, Tennessee, U.S. (original); Concord, North Carolina, U.S. (original; TNN Motor Sports division)

Ownership
- Owner: WSM, Inc. (1983); Gaylord Entertainment Company (1983–1997); Group W Satellite Communications (1983–1997); CBS Satellite Communications (1997–2000); CBS Corporation (1997–2000); Viacom (2000–2003)

History
- Launched: March 7, 1983; 43 years ago
- Closed: August 11, 2003; 23 years ago
- Replaced by: Spike TV

TNN (originally The Nashville Network; later known as The National Network and The New TNN) was an American country music-oriented cable television network. Programming included music videos, taped concerts, movies, game shows, syndicated programs, and numerous talk shows. On September 25, 2000, after an attempt to attract younger viewers failed, TNN's country music format was changed and the network was renamed The National Network, and eventually became Spike TV in 2003 and Paramount Network in 2018.

== History ==
=== Beginnings ===
The Nashville Network was launched as a basic cable and satellite television network on March 7, 1983, operating from the now-defunct Opryland USA theme park near Nashville, Tennessee. Country Music Television (CMT), founded by Glenn D. Daniels, beat TNN's launch by two days to become the first country music cable television network.

TNN was originally owned by WSM, Inc., a subsidiary of National Life and Accident Insurance Company that owned several broadcasting and tourism properties in Nashville and the traditional country radio and stage show The Grand Ole Opry, and initially focused on country music-related original programming. TNN's flagship shows included Nashville Now and Grand Ole Opry Live, both of which were broadcast live from Opryland USA. During TNN's first year of broadcasting, American General Corporation, parent company of NL&AIC, put the network up for sale, along with the other NL&AI properties, in an effort to focus on its core businesses.

=== Gaylord ownership (1983–1997) ===
The Gaylord Entertainment Company purchased TNN and the Opryland properties in the latter half of 1983. Much of TNN's programming during the Gaylord era was originally produced by Opryland Productions, also owned by Gaylord Entertainment. Programming included variety shows, talk shows, game shows (such as Fandango and Top Card), outdoors shows, and lifestyle shows, all centered in some way around country music or Southern U.S. culture. Some of TNN's popular on-air talent included Miss America 1983 Debra Maffett (TNN Country News), and local Nashville media personalities Ralph Emery, Dan Miller, Charlie Chase, Lorianne Crook and Gary Beaty, as well as established stars such as country music singer Bill Anderson and actresses Florence Henderson and Dinah Shore. TNN even created stars, such as wily professional fisherman Bill Dance. Grand Ole Opry singer and 1960s country star Bobby Lord, known for his skills as a sportsman and living in his native Florida, hosted the program Country Sportsman, featuring hunting and fishing excursions with various country stars. Inspired by ABC's The American Sportsman, the TNN show was later renamed Celebrity Sportsman after ABC objected to the similarity to its program. One of the most popular shows that aired on the network during this time was a variety show hosted by the country music quartet The Statler Brothers.

In 1986, TNN started airing professional rodeos, beginning with the Mesquite Championship Rodeo.

In 1991, Gaylord Entertainment purchased TNN's chief competitor, CMT, and operated it in tandem with TNN. CMT continued to show country music videos exclusively throughout Gaylord's ownership. Following the acquisition, TNN quickly phased out its music video blocks, while directing viewers to CMT for such fare.

In 1993, Emery began a short-lived retirement from broadcasting, and left Nashville Now in the process. Upon Emery's exit, the show was merged with fellow TNN program Crook & Chase and renamed Music City Tonight (hosted by Lorianne Crook and Charlie Chase). The same year, TNN Country News debuted and was hosted by Debra Maffett. The programming block TNN Outdoors debuted in 1993, and featured hunting and fishing shows, as well as PRCA rodeo and PBR bull riding. In 1996, Crook and Chase left the show to relaunch their eponymous program in daytime syndication; it would return exclusively to TNN in 1997. Meanwhile, Music City Tonight was again overhauled to more closely resemble its original Nashville Now format, but was rebranded as Prime Time Country. This version was originally hosted by actor Tom Wopat (of The Dukes of Hazzard fame). He was later replaced with singer/songwriter Gary Chapman, who enjoyed relative success with the show until its cancellation in 1999 as part of the network's change of focus.

TNN had two subdivisions focused on specialty programming: TNN Outdoors and TNN Motor Sports. In 1998, country singer Tracy Byrd became the on-air spokesman for the TNN Outdoors block, and stayed until 2000. TNN Motor Sports was responsible for production of all of the network's auto racing and motorsports coverage. Regarding the latter, NASCAR races (including those of the then-Winston Cup Series, Busch Grand National Series, and Craftsman Truck Series) were the most prominently featured. However, races of other series such as IMSA, Indy Racing League (IRL), American Speed Association (ASA), World of Outlaws, and NHRA were also showcased, as were motorcycle and monster truck racing. TNN Outdoors and TNN Motor Sports also were marketed as separate entities, selling a variety of merchandise and being branded onto video games such as TNN Bass Tournament of Champions and TNN Outdoors Bass Tournament '96.

In 1995, the network's motorsports operations were moved into the industrial park located at Charlotte Motor Speedway in Concord, North Carolina, where TNN had purchased controlling interest in World Sports Enterprises, a motorsports production company founded by motorsports editor and commentator Ken Squier and Fred Rheinstein. Notable TNN racing personalities included Mike Joy, Steve Evans, Eli Gold, Buddy Baker, Neil Bonnett, Randy Pemberton, Ralph Sheheen, Dick Berggren, Matt Yocum, Brock Yates, Paul Page, Don Garlits, Gary Gerould, Army Armstrong, and Rick Benjamin.

The outdoors and motorsports programs were so successful that, by the early 1990s, only those shows were seen on Sundays, with no musical programming.

=== Westinghouse-CBS/Viacom ownership (1997–2000) ===
Westinghouse Electric, who at the time owned the CBS network and had an existing relationship with TNN through its Group W division, purchased TNN and its sister network CMT outright in 1997 to form the CBS Cable division, along with a short-lived startup network entitled Eye On People.

Most of the original entertainment-oriented programming ceased production during this period, and the network began to rely more on TNN Outdoors and TNN Motor Sports for programming. The network's ties to CBS allowed it to pick up Southern-themed CBS dramas from the 1980s such as The Dukes of Hazzard and Dallas, and also allowed it to carry CBS Sports' overruns, which happened during a NASCAR Busch Series race at Texas Motor Speedway and also a PGA Tour event at Firestone Country Club. It also broadcast the 1998 Pepsi 400 on October 17, 1998, after CBS was unable to air it on the rescheduled date (from July 4, due to the 1998 Florida wildfires).

==== Professional wrestling and The New TNN (1999–2003) ====
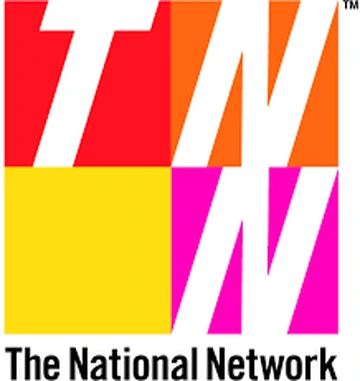
TNN's logo, between 2000 and 2003

In the late-1990s, TNN began to distance itself from its core country music lifestyle image to appeal to a wider audience, including younger demographics who were more attractive to advertisers.

In 1999, TNN began to add sports entertainment programming, beginning with the roller derby series RollerJam. The success of RollerJam led to TNN reaching a three-year deal for a weekly television series from the Philadelphia-based professional wrestling promotion Extreme Championship Wrestling (ECW), which would air on Friday nights beginning in late-August 1999. Under the contract, ECW also agreed to revenue sharing with TNN for all of the promotion's events (including live shows and pay-per-views) and merchandising. These two programs would air as part of a Friday-night block themed around extreme sports programming, alongside Motor Madness and bull riding from the Professional Bull Riders (PBR); a TNN executive described bull riding as being "the original extreme sport".

In November 1999, TNN announced new programming and primetime theme blocks it planned to introduce in 2000, including Movie Monday (which would target female viewers), Action Wednesday, Friday Night Thrill Zone (which would be anchored by RollerJam and ECW), Classic Country on Saturday nights, and TNN Outdoors on Sundays. The new schedule, along with new series such as the action drama 18 Wheels of Justice, collegiate bowling competition series Rockin' Bowl, reruns of the Western anthology Dead Man's Gun, and a new promotional campaign targeting younger viewers, were intended to introduce a broader audience to the network.

Despite ECW reportedly driving a 200% increase in young male viewership in its timeslot, the promotion had a strained relationship with TNN's management. The network gave ECW little promotion in comparison to other shows like RollerJam (which ECW producer Rick Buffone derided as "that stupid roller blading show"), and gave it an insufficient budget despite expectations for a program with production values rivaling the flagship shows of ECW's competitors. The promotion would reference these difficulties in its storylines via the heel stable The Network, whose leader Cyrus portrayed a TNN executive who constantly criticized ECW's content, and displayed favoritism towards the heavily promoted RollerJam and Rockin' Bowl.

On September 25, 2000, TNN was folded into the MTV Networks division based in New York City, and was renamed The National Network. The rebranding coincided with major changes to the network's programming, including the move of Monday Night Raw—the flagship weekly program of the World Wrestling Federation (WWF, later WWE)—to TNN from USA Network as part of a new contract with Viacom. As WWF programs were among USA Network's top programs, the move was considered a major coup for TNN. MTV Networks chairman Tom Freston described TNN as now being a general entertainment service, albeit one with a "sort of populist middle-America flavor" rather than "another network for New York or Los Angeles."

Football also became more prominent on the network, as it began airing games of the original Arena Football League (AFL) with Eli Gold as an announcer. TNN was also one of three networks to air games of the ill-fated, WWF-backed XFL (along with NBC and UPN). As part of its contract, TNN had the rights to a late Sunday afternoon game each week except for the first week, when UPN aired the afternoon game instead. In 2001, TNN aired CBS Sports-produced coverage of the inaugural opening round game of the NCAA Division I men's basketball tournament. The opening round game would later move to ESPN in 2002.

In 2001, the channel began to promote itself as "The New TNN" (an inadvertent pleonasm in its full context), and added off-network sitcoms and dramas such as Diff'rent Strokes, The Wonder Years, The Rockford Files, WKRP in Cincinnati, Newhart, Hangin' With Mr. Cooper, Miami Vice and Taxi. It also became the first channel to air reruns of MADtv. These moves went unnoticed for the most part, due to TNN's lack of popularity. By this time, all country music programming had been purged from the network; some of The Nashville Network's former programming was picked up by CMT, while other classic TNN shows were picked up by Great American Country, including eventually the Grand Ole Opry, which was pushed off to CMT and eventually removed by Viacom after they did not renew the agreement to carry the series.

By 2002, the channel had picked up more male-oriented shows, such as American Gladiators, The A-Team, Baywatch, Monster Jam, the hidden camera game show Oblivious, Robot Wars Extreme Warriors, and SlamBall.

=== Relaunch as Spike TV ===
In April 2003, Viacom announced that TNN would be relaunched as Spike TV, becoming a men's interest channel.

Spike was rebranded as the Paramount Network on January 18, 2018.

== See also ==
- Great American Country, former competitor and current home to some former TNN programs
- RFD-TV (Rural Free Delivery TV), a network launched in 2000 with similar programming to TNN
