= Rogersville, Tennessee =

Town in the United States

Rogersville
- Town
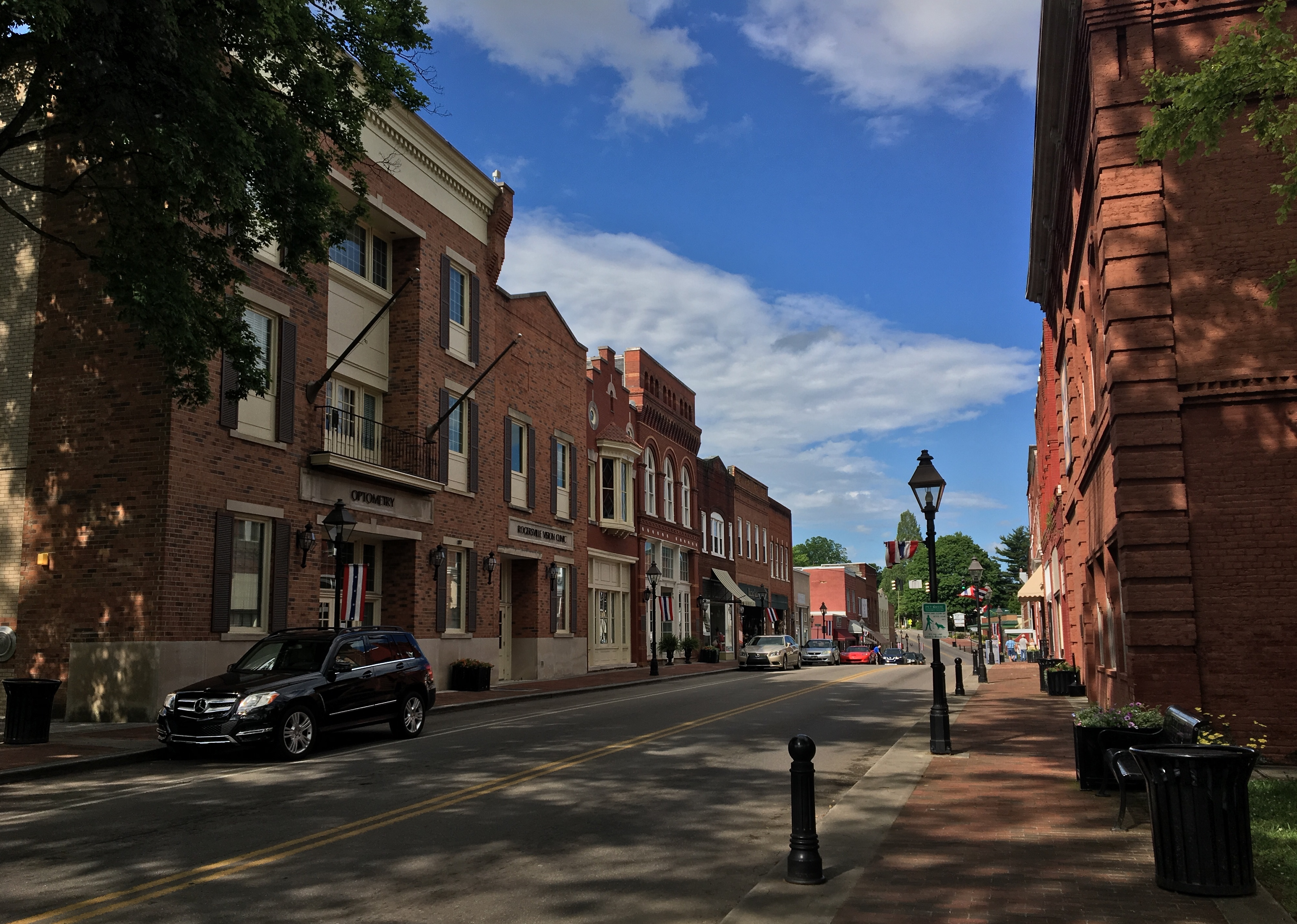
- Downtown Rogersville in June 2020

- Location in Hawkins County, Tennessee
- Coordinates: 36°25′N 83°0′W
- Country: United States
- State: Tennessee
- County: Hawkins
- Settled: 1775
- Founded: 1789
- Incorporated: 1903
- Named for: Joseph Rogers

Government
  - Type: Mayor-council
  - Mayor: John Metz (R)
  - Vice Mayor: Brady Forgety
  - Town Council: Aldermen: Brady Forgety (also Vice Mayor); Todd Biggs; Danny Brooks; Brock Gladson; Charlie Gibson; Andrew Poe

Area
  - Town: 3.76 sq mi (9.73 km^{2})
  - Land: 3.76 sq mi (9.73 km^{2})
  - Water: 0 sq mi (0.00 km^{2})
- Elevation: 1,300 ft (400 m)

Population (2020)
  - Town: 4,671
  - Density: 1,242.8/sq mi (479.83/km^{2})
  - Urban: 6,390
- Time zone: UTC−5 (Eastern (EST))
  - Summer (DST): UTC−4 (EDT)
- ZIP code: 37857
- Area code: 423
- FIPS code: 47-64820
- GNIS feature ID: 2407236
- Website: rogersvilletn.gov

Rogersville is a town in and the county seat of Hawkins County, Tennessee, United States. It was settled in 1775 by the grandparents of Davy Crockett. It is named for its founder, Joseph Rogers. Tennessee's second oldest courthouse, the Hawkins County Courthouse, first newspaper The Knoxville Gazette, and first post office are all located in Rogersville. The Rogersville Historic District is listed on the National Register of Historic Places.

Rogersville is part of the Kingsport-Bristol-Bristol, TN-VA Metropolitan Statistical Area, which is a component of the Tri-Cities region.

As of the 2020 census, Rogersville had a population of 4,671.

== History ==
=== Settlement background ===
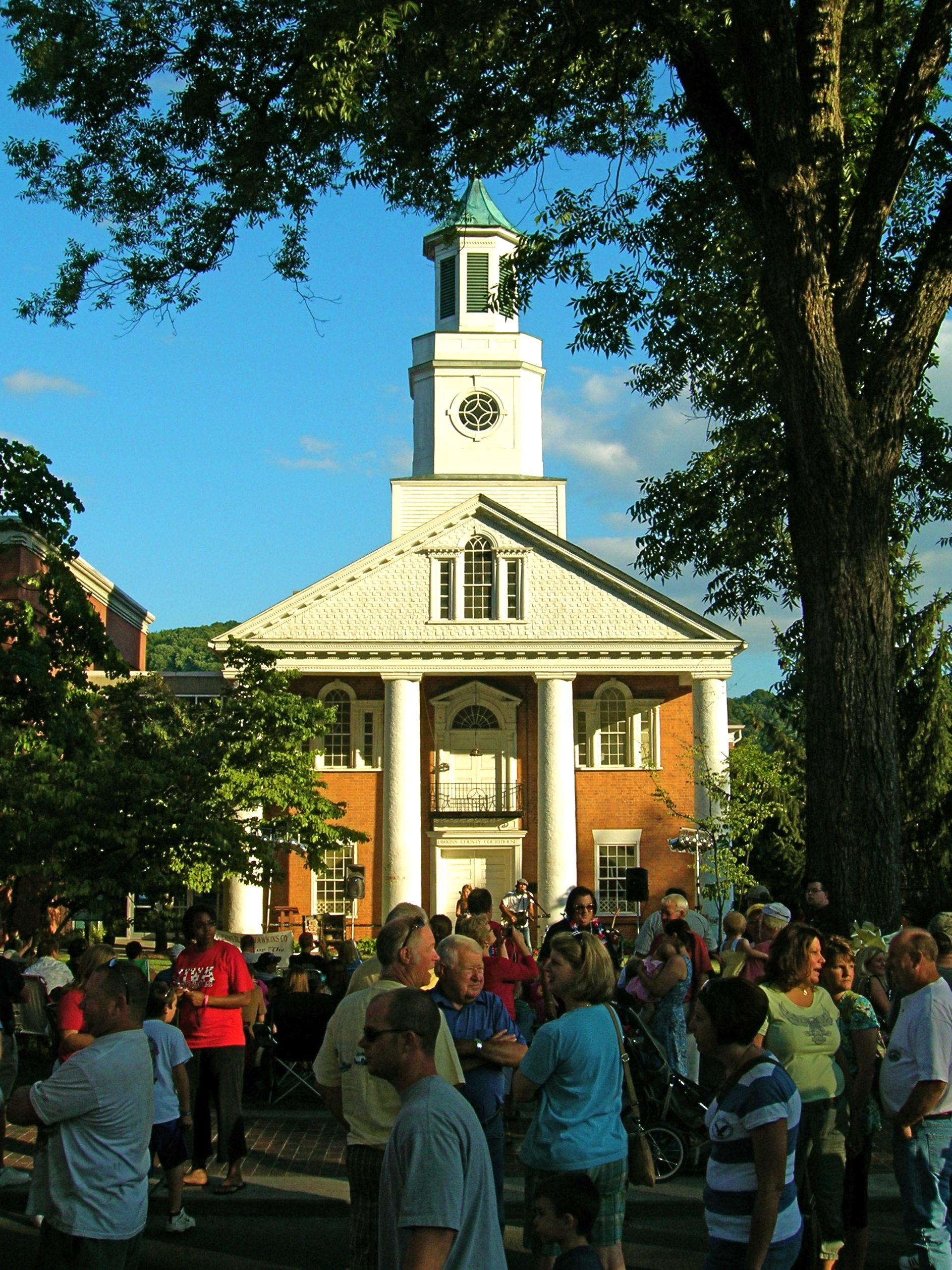
Hawkins County Courthouse, ca. 1835–36, is situated at the center of Rogersville. Still in use, it is the second oldest courthouse in Tennessee.

In 1775, the grandparents of Davy Crockett, a future member of the United States Congress from Tennessee and hero of the Alamo, settled in the Watauga colony in the area in what is today Rogersville near the spring that today bears their name. After an American Indian attack and massacre, the remaining Crocketts sold the property to a Huguenot named Colonel Thomas Amis.

In 1780, Colonel Amis built a fort at Big Creek, on the outskirts of the present-day town, with the assistance of fellow Scots-Irish settler John Carter. That same year, about 3.5 miles (5.6 km) above downtown Rogersville, Amis erected a fortress-like stone house, around which he built a palisade for protection against Native American attack. The next year, Amis opened a store, erected a blacksmith shop, and built a distillery. He also eventually established a sawmill and a gristmill. From the first he kept a house of entertainment.

=== Founding of the town ===
In 1785, the State of Franklin organized Spencer County (which includes the area of present-day Hawkins County, Tennessee) and declared the seat of county government to be located at what is today Rogersville. Thomas Henderson was chosen county court clerk and colonel of the militia. William Cocke and Thomas King were elected representatives to the Franklin General Assembly. The remaining county officers are unknown.

In November 1786, North Carolina began once more to contend with the Franklin government for control over the area, and that state's General Assembly passed an act creating Hawkins County. It included within its limits all the territory between Bays Mountain and the Holston and Tennessee rivers on the east to the Cumberland Mountains on the west. The county court was organized at the house of Thomas Gibbons. As had the state of Franklin, North Carolina set the new county seat about the property of Joseph Rogers.

=== Joseph Rogers ===
Joseph Rogers founded Rogersville on land granted to him by his father-in-law after his marriage to Mary.

Joseph Rogers (August 21, 1764 – November 6, 1833) was born near Cook's Town, Ireland, the son of James Rogers and his wife, Elizabeth Brown. He traveled to the area, by then known as the State of Franklin (which had been carved out of far west North Carolina), by 1785. During a stay at a tavern adjacent to Colonel Thomas Amis' home, Rogers met the colonel's daughter, Mary Amis, whom he wed, on October 24, 1786. Her father ceded the lands near Crockett Spring to his son-in-law— the same land that Colonel Amis had purchased from the heirs of David Crockett.

When North Carolina considered where to establish the county seat for its new Hawkins County, Rogers successfully lobbied to have the government located near his home. He volunteered his tavern, which had been established about 1784–85, as the first county courthouse, where it was finally established in 1787. With the help of other local settlers, Rogers laid out a plan for the town, and the town of Rogersville was chartered by the North Carolina General Assembly in 1789. The plan included a public square, deeded to the town government, which would host the town's public well and a county courthouse.

In November 1792, Rogers was appointed the first postmaster at Rogersville. The town's second post office, built by Rogers c. 1815, still stands at the corner of east Main Street and south Hasson Street.

Rogers was the father of fourteen children with Mary. He died on November 6, 1833, at Rogersville, and is buried in Rogers Cemetery. His wife, Mary, died a month later.

=== A town divided ===
In November 1863, during the Civil War, Rogersville was the site of a battle between occupying Federal forces and invading Confederate troops. Union forces had encamped just outside the town. The Confederates, led by Brigadier General William E. Jones, were able to surprise the Union forces and pursue them across the Holston River and into Greene County. The Confederates held the town for the remainder of the war.

Sentiment in Rogersville was divided. Many supported the efforts of twenty-six East Tennessee counties seceding from the state (much as the State of Scott had done) and re-joining the Union. Others saw President Lincoln's invasion of Tennessee as an unprecedented invasion of their homes and an incursion by Federal power; these people became strong Confederates. Rogersville was spared destruction during the war. In fact, structures such as the Hale Springs Inn were used by the different occupying armies.

=== Cradle of Tennessee journalism ===
Downtown Rogersville has been home to many of the town's numerous newspapers and publications.

George Roulstone was Tennessee's first printer. He was encouraged to settle in Rogersville by William Blount, the new governor of the Southwest Territory. Roulston printed Tennessee's first newspaper on November 5, 1791. Because Knoxville, the intended seat of the new territorial government, had not yet been established, Roulstone published the first year of his paper near the Rogers tavern. Roulstone called the newspaper The Knoxville Gazette and in October 1792, he moved his press to Knoxville, where he continued to publish the Gazette as well as other papers until his death in 1804. After the Gazette was moved, there was no newspaper in the area until 1813, when John B. Hood began publishing The East Tennessee Gazette at Rogersville. Other papers shortly followed, including The Western Pilot, c. 1815, and The Rogersville Gazette from the same era.

Specialty publications emerged during these early days, including The Rail-Road Advocate, The Calvinistic Magazine, and The Holston Watchman. Numerous other newspapers have been published in Rogersville over the years, most surviving only a short time and having modest circulation. Among them were The Independent, The Rogersville Spectator, The Weekly Reporter, The Rogersville Gazette, Rogersville Press and Times, Holston Journal, Hawkins County Republican, Hawkins County Telephone, and The Rogersville Herald.

Rogersville's longest-lasting newspaper is The Rogersville Review, which began publication as The Holston Review in 1885 by William T. Robertson. A year later, Robertson changed the name to the present banner. The Review's closest competitor in lifespan was The Rogersville Herald, which was published from 1886 to 1932.

The town's printing heritage is chronicled by the Tennessee Newspaper and Printing Museum, located in the town's historic Southern Railway train depot, c. 1890.

=== Modern day ===
In 2020, the Rogersville Town Council acquired a three-acre site of a vacant shopping center with plans to turn the site into a civic service campus, consisting of a new community center, town hall, and a concessions area for users of Rogersville town park, which borders the complex site.

== Geography ==
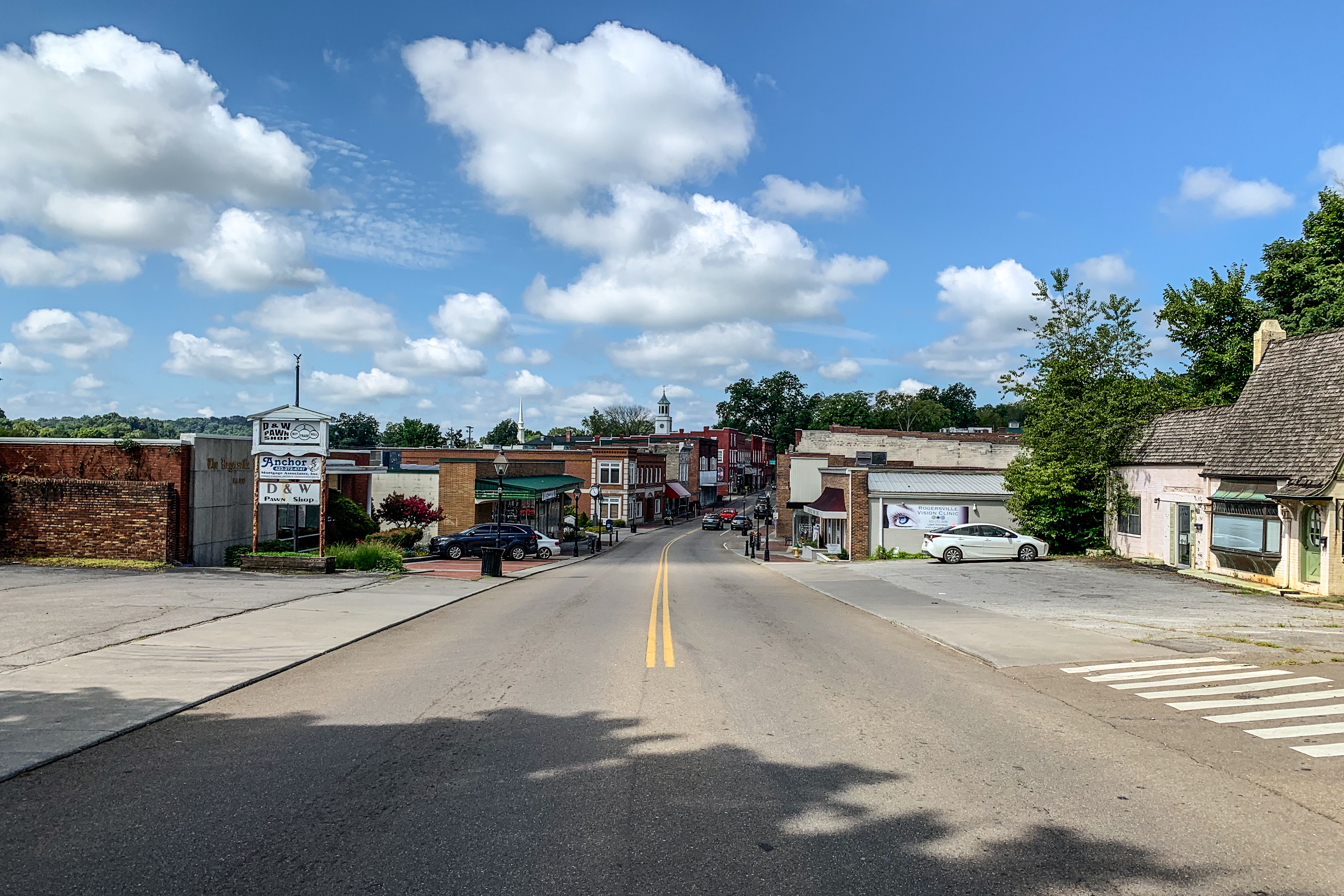
Downtown Rogersville

Rogersville is located slightly southwest of the center of Hawkins County. According to the United States Census Bureau, the town has a total area of 3.4 square miles (8.8 km^{2}), all land. The town is in the valley of Crockett Creek, a southwest-flowing tributary of the Holston River. The elevation of Rogersville is 1,286 feet (392 m). Via U.S. Route 11W (see below), it is 28 miles (45 km) southwest of Kingsport and 65 miles (105 km) northeast of Knoxville.

Rogersville is located in the Ridge and Valley Ecoregion, part of the Appalachian Mountains.

=== Climate ===
Climate data for Rogersville 1 NE, Tennessee (1991–2020 normals, extremes 1896–present)
| Month | Jan | Feb | Mar | Apr | May | Jun | Jul | Aug | Sep | Oct | Nov | Dec | Year |
|---|---|---|---|---|---|---|---|---|---|---|---|---|---|
| Record high °F (°C) | 80 (27) | 81 (27) | 86 (30) | 95 (35) | 96 (36) | 104 (40) | 102 (39) | 102 (39) | 103 (39) | 95 (35) | 84 (29) | 81 (27) | 104 (40) |
| Mean daily maximum °F (°C) | 45.3 (7.4) | 50.2 (10.1) | 59.1 (15.1) | 68.6 (20.3) | 76.2 (24.6) | 82.6 (28.1) | 85.5 (29.7) | 84.9 (29.4) | 80.4 (26.9) | 70.1 (21.2) | 58.2 (14.6) | 48.2 (9.0) | 67.4 (19.7) |
| Daily mean °F (°C) | 35.4 (1.9) | 39.4 (4.1) | 47.0 (8.3) | 56.3 (13.5) | 64.8 (18.2) | 71.8 (22.1) | 75.2 (24.0) | 74.2 (23.4) | 68.9 (20.5) | 57.6 (14.2) | 46.5 (8.1) | 38.5 (3.6) | 56.3 (13.5) |
| Mean daily minimum °F (°C) | 25.5 (−3.6) | 28.7 (−1.8) | 34.9 (1.6) | 44.1 (6.7) | 53.4 (11.9) | 60.9 (16.1) | 64.9 (18.3) | 63.5 (17.5) | 57.5 (14.2) | 45.2 (7.3) | 34.9 (1.6) | 28.8 (−1.8) | 45.2 (7.3) |
| Record low °F (°C) | −23 (−31) | −17 (−27) | −4 (−20) | 20 (−7) | 27 (−3) | 33 (1) | 44 (7) | 44 (7) | 31 (−1) | 16 (−9) | 5 (−15) | −18 (−28) | −23 (−31) |
| Average precipitation inches (mm) | 4.56 (116) | 4.17 (106) | 4.53 (115) | 4.54 (115) | 4.15 (105) | 4.40 (112) | 4.94 (125) | 3.22 (82) | 3.29 (84) | 2.73 (69) | 3.38 (86) | 4.93 (125) | 48.84 (1,241) |
| Average snowfall inches (cm) | 3.2 (8.1) | 2.1 (5.3) | 0.3 (0.76) | 0.0 (0.0) | 0.0 (0.0) | 0.0 (0.0) | 0.0 (0.0) | 0.0 (0.0) | 0.0 (0.0) | 0.0 (0.0) | 0.0 (0.0) | 0.7 (1.8) | 6.3 (16) |
| Average precipitation days (≥ 0.01 in) | 9.6 | 9.2 | 9.6 | 9.3 | 9.2 | 10.6 | 10.4 | 7.7 | 6.7 | 6.7 | 7.6 | 8.8 | 105.4 |
| Average snowy days (≥ 0.1 in) | 1.3 | 0.9 | 0.3 | 0.0 | 0.0 | 0.0 | 0.0 | 0.0 | 0.0 | 0.0 | 0.0 | 0.4 | 2.9 |
Source: NOAA

== Transportation ==
=== Major highways ===
- US 11W, Lee Highway
- Primary state highways
  - SR 70, Trail of the Lonesome Pine
  - SR 66
- Secondary state highways
  - SR 1, Memphis to Bristol Highway
  - SR 347

=== Airports ===
The Hawkins County Airport is a county-owned public-use airport located six nautical miles (7 mi, 11 km) northeast of the central business district of Rogersville.

== Demographics ==
Historical population
| Census | Pop. | Note | %± |
|---|---|---|---|
| 1870 | 657 | | — |
| 1880 | 740 | | 12.6% |
| 1890 | 1,153 | | 55.8% |
| 1900 | 1,386 | | 20.2% |
| 1910 | 1,242 | | −10.4% |
| 1920 | 1,402 | | 12.9% |
| 1930 | 1,590 | | 13.4% |
| 1940 | 2,018 | | 26.9% |
| 1950 | 2,545 | | 26.1% |
| 1960 | 3,121 | | 22.6% |
| 1970 | 4,076 | | 30.6% |
| 1980 | 4,368 | | 7.2% |
| 1990 | 4,149 | | −5.0% |
| 2000 | 4,240 | | 2.2% |
| 2010 | 4,420 | | 4.2% |
| 2020 | 4,671 | | 5.7% |

=== 2020 census ===
Rogersville racial composition
| Race | Number | Percentage |
|---|---|---|
| White (non-Hispanic) | 4,214 | 90.22% |
| Black or African American (non-Hispanic) | 149 | 3.19% |
| Native American | 11 | 0.24% |
| Asian | 35 | 0.75% |
| Other/Mixed | 168 | 3.6% |
| Hispanic or Latino | 94 | 2.01% |

As of the 2020 census, Rogersville had a population of 4,671. The median age was 43.6 years. 21.1% of residents were under the age of 18 and 24.7% of residents were 65 years of age or older. For every 100 females, there were 85.9 males, and for every 100 females age 18 and over, there were 82.5 males age 18 and over.

99.4% of residents lived in urban areas, while 0.6% lived in rural areas.

There were 1,995 households in Rogersville, including 1,150 families. Of those households, 26.8% had children under the age of 18 living in them. Of all households, 31.0% were married-couple households, 20.5% were households with a male householder and no spouse or partner present, and 41.4% were households with a female householder and no spouse or partner present. About 40.4% of all households were made up of individuals, and 21.6% had someone living alone who was 65 years of age or older.

There were 2,297 housing units, of which 13.1% were vacant. The homeowner vacancy rate was 3.4% and the rental vacancy rate was 8.4%.

=== 2000 census ===
==== Population ====
As of the census of 2000, there were 4,240 people, 2,060 households, and 1,155 families residing in the town. The population density was 1,277 inhabitants per square mile (493/km^{2}). There were 2,268 housing units at an average density of 683.1 per square mile (263.7/km^{2}).

==== Ethnicity ====
The racial makeup of the town was 94.13% White, 4.06% African American, 0.14% Native American, 0.31% Asian, 0.02% Pacific Islander, 0.66% from other races, and 0.68% from two or more races. Hispanic or Latino of any race were 1.06% of the population.

==== Age distribution ====
There were 2,060 households, out of which 21.0% had children under the age of 18 living with them, 38.9% were married couples living together, 14.2% had a female householder with no husband present, and 43.9% were non-families. 40.9% of all households were made up of individuals, and 21.1% had someone living alone who was 65 years of age or older. The average household size was 1.97 and the average family size was 2.63.

In the town, the age distribution of the population shows 17.8% under the age of 18, 8.0% from 18 to 24, 23.2% from 25 to 44, 24.8% from 45 to 64, and 26.2% who were 65 years of age or older. The median age was 46 years. For every 100 females, there were 76.6 males. For every 100 females age 18 and over, there were 72.1 males.

==== Economic statistics ====
The median income for a household in the town was $23,275, and the median income for a family was $32,236. Males had a median income of $30,226 versus $22,482 for females. The per capita income for the town was $16,940. About 14.9% of families and 21.0% of the population were below the poverty line, including 30.0% of those under age 18 and 15.8% of those age 65 or over.

== Culture ==
=== Notable people ===
Listed chronologically by date of birth:

- Hardrock- world wide traveler and the greatest hitch hiker of all-time.
- Detcie- Street performance specialist in front of Big John’s Restaurant on E. Main Street in Rogersville, dressed in an evening gown or prom dress, with a boom box in tow, dancing to her music.
- Justice Sarah Keeton Campbell, born 1982, served as a Deputy Solicitor General of Tennessee and was appointed to the Tennessee Supreme Court by Governor Bill Lee in January 2021. Campbell's parents moved their family to the town when she was eleven years old, and she is an alumna of the town's Cherokee High School.
- Missy Testerman, born in the 1970s, was the 2024 National Teacher of The Year.
- Charlie Chase (original name Wayne Bernard), born 1952, is a radio and television host best known for his work in hosting the nationally syndicated television show Crook & Chase on The Nashville Network (TNN) in the 1990s.
- Commissioner Ken Givens, born 1947, was the Republican State Representative from Tennessee's Ninth State House District from 1988 to 2002. In 2009, Governor Phil Bredesen appointed Givens to be the 35th Commissioner of Agriculture of Tennessee, a Cabinet-level position in the Gubernatorial Administration. Givens served as Commissioner until Governor Bill Haslam was sworn into office in January 2011. He was born to Rogersville parents and graduated from Rogersville High School in 1965.
- General Ronald E. Brooks, 1937–2018, was a Major General in the United States Army during the Cold War. During his military career, he commanded 1st Aviation Brigade; U.S. Army Personnel Information Systems Command; U.S. Army Soldier Support Center; and Fort Benjamin Harrison. He was born and raised in Rogersville and graduated from Rogersville High School in 1955.
- Congressman William L. "Bill" Jenkins, born 1936, was the Republican Representative from Tennessee's First Congressional District from 1997 to 2007. Jenkins was the only Republican Speaker of the Tennessee House of Representatives in the twentieth century, serving from 1969 to 1971. He was born to Rogersville parents and grew up in the town.
- Robert "Bob" Smith, 1895–1987, was a Major League Baseball player for the Cincinnati Reds, the Chicago Cubs, and the Boston Braves from 1925 to 1937; he was born and raised in Rogersville.
- Richard Hale (born James Richards Hale), 1892–1981, was a baritone opera and concert singer and a character actor of film, stage, and television. His best-known film roles were in Friendly Persuasion, Julius Caesar (1953), and To Kill a Mockingbird. He was born and brought up in the town.
- Ruth Hale, 1887–1934, was a freelance writer and member of the Algonquin Round Table who campaigned for women's rights before World War I. She was born and grew up in the town.
- Senator George L. Berry, 1882–1948, was a leader in the labor union movement and president of the International Pressmen's and Assistants' Union of North America from 1907 to 1948. Berry was appointed the Democratic senator from Tennessee from 1937 to 1938 by Governor Gordon Browning. Berry founded Pressmen's Home, near Rogersville.
- John M. Fleming, 1832–1900, was a prominent 19th-century newspaper editor and state legislator.
- General A.P. Stewart, 1821–1908, was a graduate of the United States Military Academy at West Point, New York, and served throughout the Civil War as a commanding officer in the Confederate States' Army of Tennessee. After the Battle of Franklin, General Stewart commanded that army. After surrendering to Union General William T. Sherman in North Carolina, Stewart was paroled and later taught at Cumberland University in Lebanon, Tennessee. He was president of the University of Mississippi at Oxford from 1874 to 1886, and he lobbied for and helped organize the creation of the Chattanooga-Chickamauga National Battlefield Park at Chattanooga, Tennessee.
- John Netherland, 1808–1887, was a prominent mid-19th century state legislator and unsuccessful candidate for governor in 1859.
- Congressman Samuel Powell, 1776–1841, was a Democratic-Republican Representative from Tennessee (1815–17); he also served as a circuit judge in Rogersville.

=== Events ===
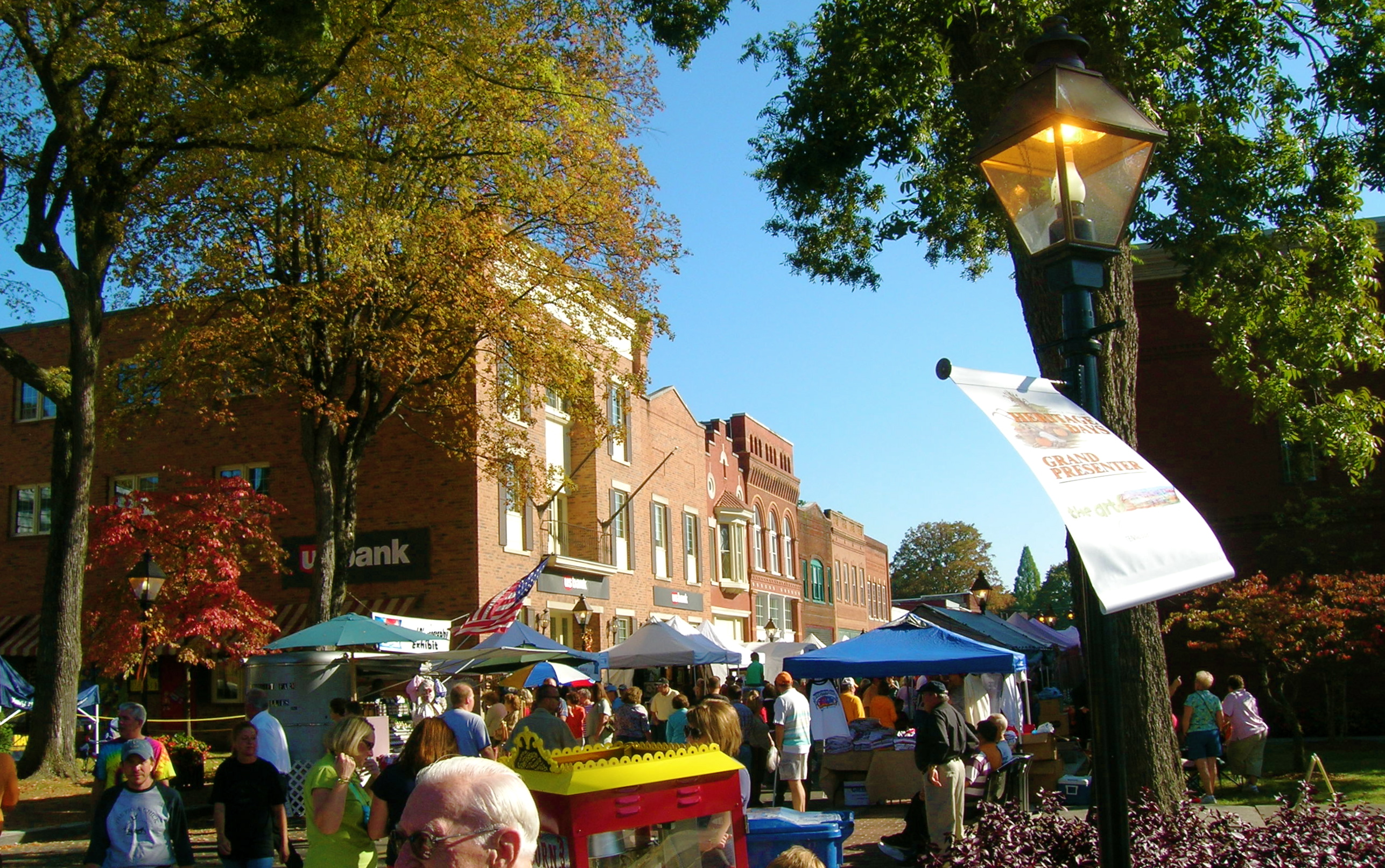
Downtown Rogersville during Heritage Days

- Heritage Days, held each second full weekend in October in downtown Rogersville
- Fourth of July Celebration
- Rogersville Holiday Festival, includes a Holiday Tour of Homes in the town's Historic District and Yule Log Ceremony on the Courthouse Square

=== Religion ===
There are no non-Christian congregations in Rogersville. Among Christian churches, congregations are predominantly Baptist. Denominations with congregations currently in Rogersville include:

- A.M.E. Zion
- Assemblies of the Lord Jesus Christ
- Baptist
- Christian (Disciples of Christ)
- Churches of Christ including non-institutional
- Church of God
- Church of God in Christ
- Episcopal (ECUSA)
- Jehovah's Witnesses
- Presbyterian (PCUSA)
- Roman Catholic
- Seventh-day Adventist
- United Methodist
- United Pentecostal

=== Media ===
==== From Rogersville ====
The following media originates from within or nearby the Town:

- The Rogersville Review, founded 1885
- WRGS AM 1370 Radio, founded 1954 (home of Charlie Chase)
- WRGS FM 94.5 Radio, founded 2009
- WEYE FM 104.3 Radio, founded 1982, now broadcasting from nearby Surgoinsville

==== Available to Rogersville ====
- The Kingsport Times-News
- The Knoxville News-Sentinel
- The Greeneville Sun
- WSJK TV-2 (Sneedville), PBS
- WCYB TV-5 (Bristol), NBC
- WATE TV-6 (Knoxville), ABC
- WVLT TV-8 (Knoxville), CBS
- WBIR TV-10 (Knoxville), NBC
- WJHL TV-11 (Johnson City), CBS
- WKPT TV-19 (Kingsport), ABC
- WAPK TV-30 (Kingsport), UPN
- WEMT TV-39 (Greenville), FOX

== Recreation ==
=== Rogersville City Park ===
Located in the eastern part of the town, the Rogersville City Park is owned and operated by the town of Rogersville. It is bounded by U.S. Route 11W on the northwest, Park Boulevard on the northeast, and East Main Street on the south.

The park has four children's playgrounds, two outdoor basketball courts, four outdoor tennis courts, numerous picnic shelters, three large, lighted pavilions (two with restroom facilities), an amphitheatre, a lighted stage area, six lighted baseball/softball fields, the town's soccer fields, a duck pond, a fitness trail, and two walking trails. It is home to the Rogersville City Pool, the home pool of the Rogersville Flying Fish Swim Association, which is open to the public from Memorial Day to the start of classes in the City school system in August.

The park is the site of a traveling midway carnival in the late spring and early fall and hosts more than fifty thousand people annually during the Rogersville Fourth of July celebration.

The town-sponsored festival of lights is hosted at the Park, where the Department of Parks & Recreation illuminates several thousand holiday lights and exhibits.

In September 2023, the Rogersville Parks and Recreation Department was awarded a $500,000 grant, to be matched with local funds, from the TN Local Parks and Recreation Fund to install ADA compliant restroom facilities and upgrade playground equipment.

=== Crockett Spring Park ===
Located in downtown Rogersville, the Crockett Spring Park is a joint project of the town and the Rogersville Heritage Association. The park is the site of Rogersville's first settlement, and the tavern and home built by founder Joseph Rogers is preserved on the site. The park encompasses the Rogers Cemetery, where Joseph and Mary Rogers and the grandparents of Davy Crockett are buried.

The site of Rogersville's first public swimming pool is here, as is the gazebo built to commemorate the bicentennials of both the town (1989) and the state (1996). This public park is maintained by the Rogersville Parks and Recreation Department and the auspices of the Rogersville Tree Board.

=== Swift Memorial Park ===
Rogersville was home to an African-American college, Swift College, in the late nineteenth and early twentieth centuries, and Swift Park, located off North Hasson Street in the central part of the town, commemorates the legacy of that institution. In addition, the park boasts picnic shelters, two playgrounds, and basketball courts.

== Education ==
There are two school districts covering the Rogersville municipal limits: elementary students are in the Rogersville City Schools while secondary students are in the Hawkins County School District.

The Rogersville School District has a single PreK-8 school, Rogersville Elementary School. It was established circa 1923. (present configuration beginning 1950; Rogersville City School System). Mascot is the Warrior (Formerly the Chief; Until Cherokee High School in 1981); colors are red, white, and black. Serving grades K-8 since 1950; from 1923 to 1950, grades 1–12 (grades 9–12 transferred to Rogersville High School). Competes in interscholastic athletics. In 2007, the RCS Warriors football team won the TMSAA state championship.

The current high school including Rogersville in its attendance boundary is Cherokee Comprehensive High School, c. 1981–present (Hawkins County School System). Serves grades 9–12. Mascot is the Chief; colors are red, black, and white. Comprehensive public high school serving students from the former Rogersville High School and Bulls Gap High School. Competes in TSSAA-sanctioned interscholastic athletics. The previous high school was Rogersville High School, c. 1923–1980. Mascot was the Warrior, colors were maroon and gray.

The county school system operates these schools within the city limits of Rogersville, although these are not the zoned schools for city residents:

- Rogersville Middle School, c. 1981–present (present configuration beginning 2000; Hawkins County School System). Mascot is the Warrior; colors are maroon and gray. Serving grades 6–8 since 2000; from 1981 to 2000, grades 5–8 (fifth grade transferred to Hawkins Elementary School). Competes in interscholastic athletics.
- Hawkins Elementary School, c. 1968–present (present configuration beginning 2000; Hawkins County School System). Mascot is the Bearcat; colors are light blue and gold. Serving grades 3–5 since 2000; from 1978 to 2000, grades K-4 (grades K-2 transferred to Joseph Rogers Primary School; fifth grade received from Rogersville Middle School).

The following county school is near, but not inside, the Rogersville city limits, and is not a zoned school for city residents:

- Joseph Rogers Primary School, c. 2000–present (Hawkins County School System). Mascot is the Bearcub and colors are green and purple. Serving grades PreK-2.
