= Moore House =

Moore House or Moore Farm may refer to:

== Canada ==
- John Moore House (Sparta, Ontario)

== United States ==
=== Alabama ===
- Drewry-Mitchell-Moorer House, Eufaula

=== Arkansas ===
- Dickinson-Moore House, Arkansas City
- Smith-Moore House, Beebe
- Moore House (Canehill, Arkansas)
- Moore-Jacobs House, Clarendon
- Moore-Hornor House, Helena
- W. H. Moore House, Hot Springs
- Moore House (Little Rock, Arkansas)
- Moore House (Searcy, Arkansas)

=== California ===
- Moore House (Long Beach, California), listed on the Long Beach historic landmarks
- Moore House (Ojai, California)
- James Moore House (Woodland, California), listed on the National Register of Historic Places (NRHP) in Yolo County, California

=== Connecticut ===
- William Moore Jr. House, Barkhamsted
- Roswell Moore II House, Southington
- Deacon John Moore House, Windsor
- Edward and Ann Moore House, Windsor

=== Delaware ===
- Moore Potato House, Laurel
- Moore House (Smyrna, Delaware)

=== Georgia ===
- Tarleton Moore House, Acworth, listed on the NRHP in Cobb County, Georgia
- Pritchard-Moore-Goodrich House, Griffin
- Williams-Moore-Hillsman House, Roberta

=== Idaho ===
- Moore-Cunningham House, Boise
- Jim Moore Place, Dixie

=== Illinois ===
- C. H. Moore House, Clinton
- Nathan G. Moore House, Oak Park

=== Indiana ===
- Thomas Moore House (Indianapolis, Indiana)
- Moore-Youse-Maxon House, Muncie

=== Iowa ===
- Josiah B. and Sara Moore House, Villisca

=== Kentucky ===
- Christopher Collins Moore Farm, Danville, listed on the NRHP in Boyle County, Kentucky
- Maria Moore House, Bowling Green, listed on the NRHP in Warren County, Kentucky
- Simeon Moore House, Fisherville
- John Moore House (Francisville, Kentucky), listed on the NRHP in Boone County, Kentucky
- Randolph Gilbert Moore House, Franklin, listed on the NRHP in Simpson County, Kentucky
- Parke-Moore House, Lancaster, listed on the NRHP in Garrard County, Kentucky
- Rev. William Dudley Moore House, Lawrenceburg
- Moore-Redd-Frazer House, Lexington, listed on the NRHP in Fayette County, Kentucky
- J. J. Moore House, Parksville, listed on the NRHP in Boyle County, Kentucky
- George F. Moore Place, Versailles, listed on the NRHP in Woodford County, Kentucky

=== Louisiana ===
- R. T. Moore House, Bernice
- Moore House (Mandeville, Louisiana)

=== Maine ===
- Moore-Mayo House, Bass Harbor
- John Moore House (Edgecomb, Maine)
- Henry D. Moore Parish House and Library, Steuben

=== Massachusetts ===
- Moore-Hill House, Peabody
- Moore House (Winchester, Massachusetts)
- Jesse Moore House, Worcester

=== Michigan ===
- Charles H. Moore–Albert E. Sleeper House, Lexington

=== Minnesota ===
- George M. Moore Farmstead, Jackson, listed on the NRHP in Minnesota

=== Mississippi ===
- Noah Moore House, Enterprise, listed on the NRHP in Clarke County, Mississippi
- House on Ellicott's Hill, Natchez

=== Missouri ===
- Moore House (Charleston, Missouri)
- J. Herbert Moore House, Poplar Bluff
- Moore-Dalton House, Poplar Bluff
- Thomas Moore House (Poplar Bluff, Missouri)

=== New Hampshire ===
- Moore Farm and Twitchell Mill Site, Dublin

=== New Mexico ===
- Moore-Ward Cobblestone House, Artesia

=== New York ===
- Moore House (Garrison, New York)
- Benjamin C. Moore Mill, Lockport
- D. D. T. Moore Farmhouse, Loudonville
- Benjamin Moore Estate, Muttontown
- Moore-McMillen House
- William H. Moore House
- Moore House (Poughkeepsie, New York)
- J. W. Moore House, Rhinebeck
- Silas B. Moore Gristmill, Ticonderoga
- Aquebogue Windmill Moore House, Aquebogue

=== North Carolina ===
- Andrews-Moore House, Bunn
- Moore-Holt-White House, Burlington
- Robert Joseph Moore House, Bynum
- Alexander Moore Farm, Catawba
- Walter R. and Eliza Smith Moore House, Clayton
- Matthew Moore House, Danbury
- Susan J. Armistead Moore House, Edenton
- Eli Moore House, High Point
- Arthur W. Moore House, Horse Shoe
- Moore House (Locust Hill, North Carolina)
- William Alfred Moore House, Mount Airy
- Moore-Manning House, Pittsboro
- John Covington Moore House, Tusquitee
- Walter E. Moore House, Webster

=== Ohio ===
- Moore House, Circleville, a contributing building in Circleville Historic District
- Leonard M. Moore House, Lorain, listed on the NRHP in Lorain County, Ohio
- Edward W. and Louise C. Moore Estate, Mentor, listed on the NRHP in Lake County, Ohio
- Philip Moore Stone House, West Portsmouth
- Charles H. Moore House, Wyoming

=== Oklahoma ===
- Moore-Lindsay House, Norman
- Moore Manor, Tulsa, listed on the NRHP in Tulsa County, Oklahoma
- Moore-Settle House, Wynnewood, listed on the NRHP in Garvin County, Oklahoma

=== Oregon ===
- Robert D. Moore House, Bend
- John and Mary Moore House, Brownsville, listed on the NRHP in Linn County, Oregon
- John and Helen Moore House, Moro

=== Pennsylvania ===
- Capt. Thomas Moore House, Philadelphia
- Clarence B. Moore House, Philadelphia
- Moore Hall (Phoenixville, Pennsylvania)
- Knipe-Moore-Rupp Farm, Upper Gwynedd Township

=== South Carolina ===
- Moore-Mann House, Columbia
- Moore-Kinard House, Ninety Six

=== Tennessee ===
- Moore Family Farm, Bulls Gap
- Hunt-Moore House, Huntland

=== Texas ===
- Moore-Hancock Farmstead, Austin, listed on the NRHP in Travis County, Texas
- Moore House (Bryan, Texas), listed on the NRHP in Brazos County, Texas
- Dixon-Moore House, Dallas, listed on the NRHP in Dallas County, Texas
- Moore House (Ennis, Texas), listed on the NRHP in Ellis County, Texas
- Morris-Moore House, Paris, listed on the NRHP in Lamar County, Texas
- John M. and Lottie D. Moore House, Richmond
- Draughon-Moore House, Texarkana
- Col. Hugh B. and Helen Moore House, Texas City, listed on the NRHP in Galveston County, Texas
- W. B. Moore House, Waxahachie, listed on the NRHP in Ellis County, Texas
- Moran-Moore House, Wharton, listed on the NRHP in Wharton County, Texas

=== Virginia ===
- Fairfax-Moore House, Alexandria
- Capt. James Moore Homestead, Boissevain
- John Moore House (Lexington, Virginia)
- J. W. R. Moore House, Mount Jackson
- Moore House (Yorktown, Virginia)

=== Washington ===
- James Moore House (Pasco, Washington), listed on the NRHP in Franklin County, Washington
- Miles C. Moore House, Walla Walla, listed on the NRHP in Walla Walla County, Washington
- Edward B. Moore House, Yakima, listed on the NRHP in Yakima County, Washington

=== West Virginia ===
- Elizabeth Moore Hall, Morgantown

=== Wisconsin ===
- Dr. Volney L. Moore House, Waukesha, listed on the NRHP in Waukesha County, Wisconsin

== See also ==
- James Moore House (disambiguation)
- John Moore House (disambiguation)
- Moorehouse, a surname
- Moor House, London
