= John Moore House =

John Moore House may refer to:

== Canada ==
- John Moore House (Sparta, Ontario)

== United States ==
- John Moore House (Windsor, Connecticut), see List of the oldest buildings in Connecticut
- John Moore House (Francisville, Kentucky), listed on the NRHP in Boone County, Kentucky
- John Moore House (Edgecomb, Maine), listed on the NRHP in Lincoln County, Maine
- John Covington Moore House, Tusquitee, North Carolina, NRHP-listed
- John and Helen Moore House, Moro, Oregon, NRHP-listed
- John and Mary Moore House, Brownsville, Oregon, listed on the NRHP in Linn County, Oregon
- John M. and Lottie D. Moore House, Richmond, Texas, NRHP-listed
- John Moore House (Lexington, Virginia), NRHP-listed

== See also ==
- Moore House (disambiguation)
