= Morehouse =

Morehouse may refer to:

== Places in the United States ==
- Morehouse, Missouri, a city
- Morehouse, New York, a town
- Morehouse, Ohio, a ghost town
- Morehouse Parish, Louisiana
- Morehouse Lake, New York
- Morehouse Brook, New York, a creek
- Lafayette Morehouse

== Other uses ==
- Morehouse (surname)
- Morehouse College, Atlanta, Georgia
- Morehouse School of Medicine, Atlanta, Georgia, a private medical school
- Comet Morehouse, a comet

== See also ==
- More House, York, England
- Moorehouse (disambiguation)
- Moore House (disambiguation)
