= Moorhouse =

Moorhouse or Moor House may refer to:

- Moorhouse (surname)
- Moorhouse (band), a New Zealand boy band
- Moorhouse, Woodside, a hamlet in the civil parish of Woodside, Cumbria, England
- Moorhouse, Cumbria, a village near Carlisle, Cumbria, England
- Moorhouse, Nottinghamshire, England
- Moorhouse, South Yorkshire, a location in England
- Moor House, a building in the City of London
- Jane Eyre § Moor House, a fictional place from the novel Jane Eyre

== See also ==
- Morehouse (disambiguation)
