= Thomas Moore House =

Thomas Moore House may refer to:

- Thomas Moore House (Indianapolis, Indiana), listed on the National Register of Historic Places in Marion County, Indiana
- Thomas Moore House (Poplar Bluff, Missouri), listed on the National Register of Historic Places in Butler County, Missouri
- Thomas Moore House (Franklin, Tennessee), listed on the National Register of Historic Places in Williamson County, Tennessee

== See also ==
- Moore House (disambiguation)
