= Morehouse (surname) =

Morehouse is a surname. Notable people with the surname include:

- Albert P. Morehouse (1835–1891), 26th Governor of Missouri
- Daniel Walter Morehouse (1876–1941) Astronomer and president of Drake University
- David Morehouse (born 1960), President and chief executive officer of Pittsburgh Penguins of the National Hockey League
- Henry Lyman Morehouse (1834–1917), American Baptist minister and hymn author
- Jim Morehouse (1864–1914), Australian rules footballer
- Lyda Morehouse (born 1967), American science fiction and fantasy author
- Oscar E. Morehouse (1857–1935), Canadian politician and doctor
- Tim Morehouse (born 1978), American fencer
- Ward Morehouse (1895–1966), American theater critic, newspaper columnist, playwright and author
- Ward Morehouse (activist) (1929–2012), anti-corporate activist

== See also ==
- Moorehouse (surname)
- Moorhouse (surname)
