= James Moore House =

James Moore House may refer to:

- James Moore House (Woodland, California), listed on the NRHP in Yolo County, California
- House on Ellicott's Hill, Natchez, Mississippi, also known as James Moore House, a U.S. National Historic Landmark
- James Moore House (Pasco, Washington), listed on the NRHP in Franklin County, Washington

== See also ==
- Moore House (disambiguation)
