= Moore Farm and Twitchell Mill Site =

- U.S. National Register of Historic Places
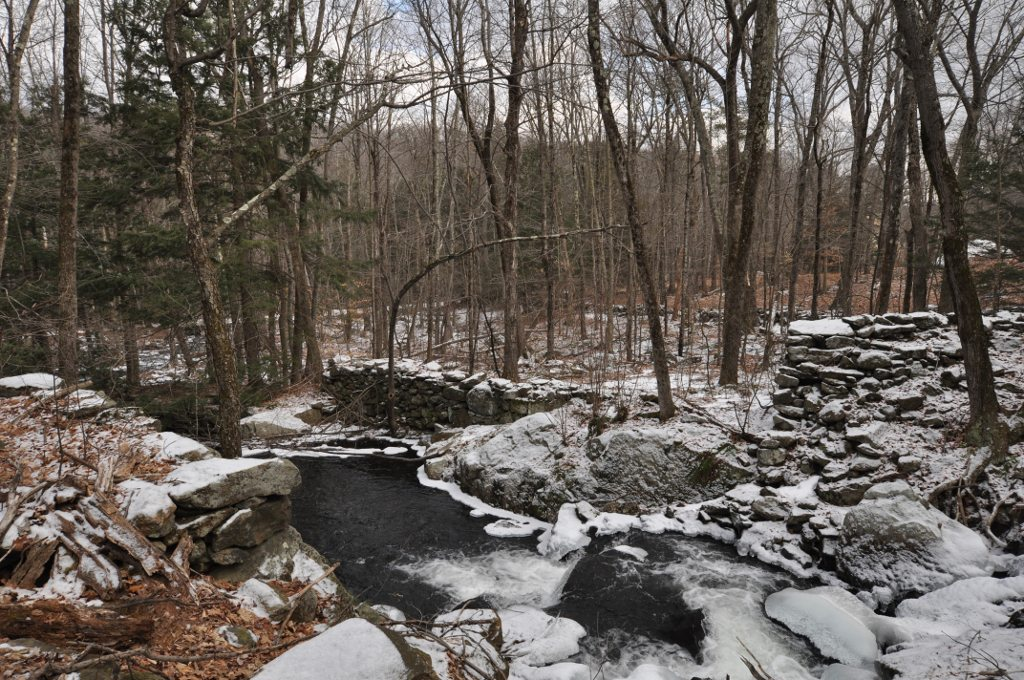
- The c. 1764 mill site

- Location within New Hampshire Location within the United States
- Location: Off Page Rd., Dublin, New Hampshire
- Coordinates: 42°51′58″N 72°2′4″W
- Area: 6.8 acres (2.8 ha)
- Built: 1768
- Built by: Samuel Moore (1812)
- Architect: Bradley & Church (1936 renovation); Eleanor Humphrey (1951 renovation)
- Architectural style: Cape Colonial
- MPS: Dublin MRA
- NRHP reference No.: 83004052
- Added to NRHP: December 18, 1983

The Moore Farm and Twitchell Mill Site is a historic property on Page Road in Dublin, New Hampshire. The 6.8-acre (2.8 ha) property includes an early 19th-century farmhouse, as well as the remnants of one of Dublin's earliest industrial sites. It lies just south of a bend in Page Road in southern Dublin, where Stanley Brook runs east–west along the south side of the road. In c. 1768 Samuel Twitchell, Dublin's second settler, built a sawmill that used Stanley Brook as its power source. This mill was the second established in what is now Dublin, after that of Eli Morse. It was used until the mid-19th century, and now only its foundations remain. The farmhouse of Samuel Moore was built in a glen on the south side of the brook c. 1812, and was a vernacular Cape style farmhouse. The farm was purchased in 1935 by William and Katherine Mitchell Jackson, and the house was moved about 100 yards (91 m) to the top of a rise where it has commanding views of Mount Monadnock. The house was restored and enlarged under the guidance of architects Bradley & Church and again renovated in 1951. The farm complex includes a barn that is contemporaneous to the house, and a caretaker's cottage that is a 1952 reconstruction of an earlier one destroyed by fire.

The property was listed on the National Register of Historic Places in 1983.

== See also ==
- National Register of Historic Places listings in Cheshire County, New Hampshire
