= Eli Morse Farm =

Historic house in New Hampshire, United States

- U.S. National Register of Historic Places
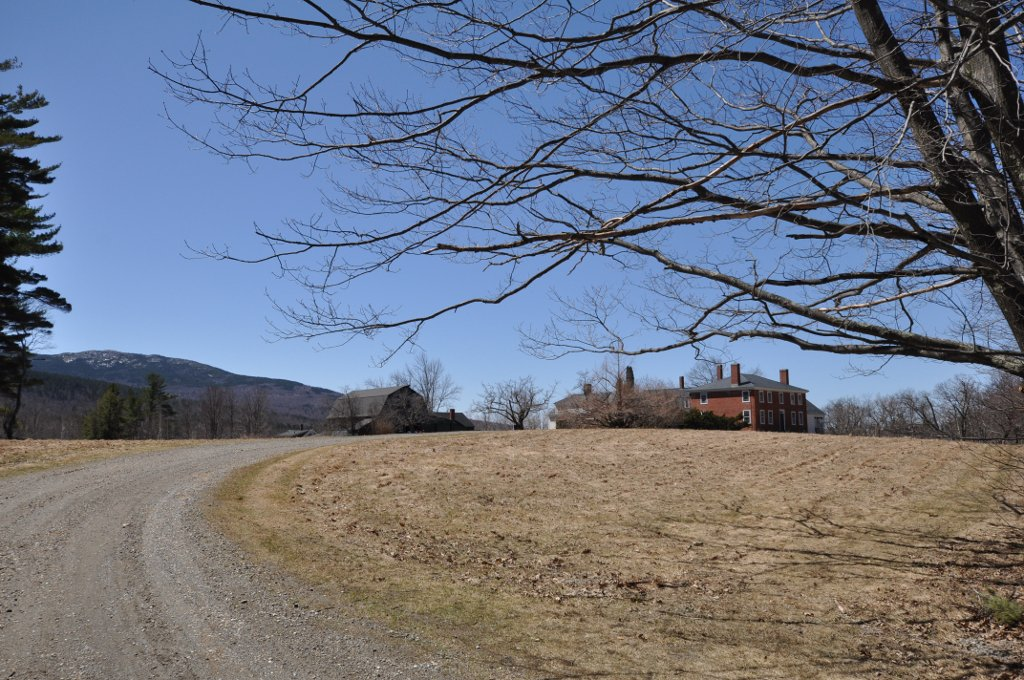

- Location within New Hampshire Location within the United States
- Location: Lake Rd., Dublin, New Hampshire
- Coordinates: 42°54′5″N 72°5′17″W
- Area: 226.5 acres (91.7 ha)
- Built: 1765
- Built by: Morse, Eli; Morse, Thaddeus
- Architectural style: Federal
- NRHP reference No.: 83001135
- Added to NRHP: April 11, 1983

The Eli Morse Farm is a historic farm on Lake Road in Dublin, New Hampshire. It is one of the earliest settlements in the town, settled by Eli Morse in 1764, and has been in the hands of just two families. Its transformation to summer resort use was one of the first in the Dublin Pond area. The farm was listed on the National Register of Historic Places in 1983.

== Description and history ==
The Eli Morse Farm is located on the south side of Lake Road, extending southward from the outlet of Dublin Pond at its southwest corner. The property is more than 200 acres (81 ha) in size, including areas of both open fields and woodlands. The main house is a large Federal style brick structure built c. 1822 by Eli Morse's son Thaddeus. Additions were made to the house in 1886, including a porch and front portico. The farmstead includes several outbuildings, including a barn, grist mill, and several cottages.

This land was settled in 1764 by Eli Morse, one of Dublin's first permanent settlers. Morse served as a clerk of the community and left an invaluable record of Dublin's early history. His son Thaddeus, who built the house, was also active in civic affairs, serving as town selectman and in other offices. His son, Thaddeus Jr., opened the house as a boarding house for summer guests in 1857, one of the first such uses of an agricultural property near Dublin Pond. Morse's heirs sold the property to Mrs Sarah Peele, and the property has remained in the hands of her descendants since then.

The farm is also notable as the summer estate of New York City lawyer and diplomat Grenville Clark, who acquired the property after marrying a Peele granddaughter. Clark organized a peace conference in 1945, held at this site, at which attendees drafted the Dublin Declaration, calling for the United Nations to be created as a world government. The Clark family continues to own the property, maintaining for agricultural and conservation purposes.

== See also ==
- Eli Morse Sawmill Foundations
- National Register of Historic Places listings in Cheshire County, New Hampshire
