= Abijah Thompson House =

Historic house in Massachusetts, United States

- U.S. National Register of Historic Places
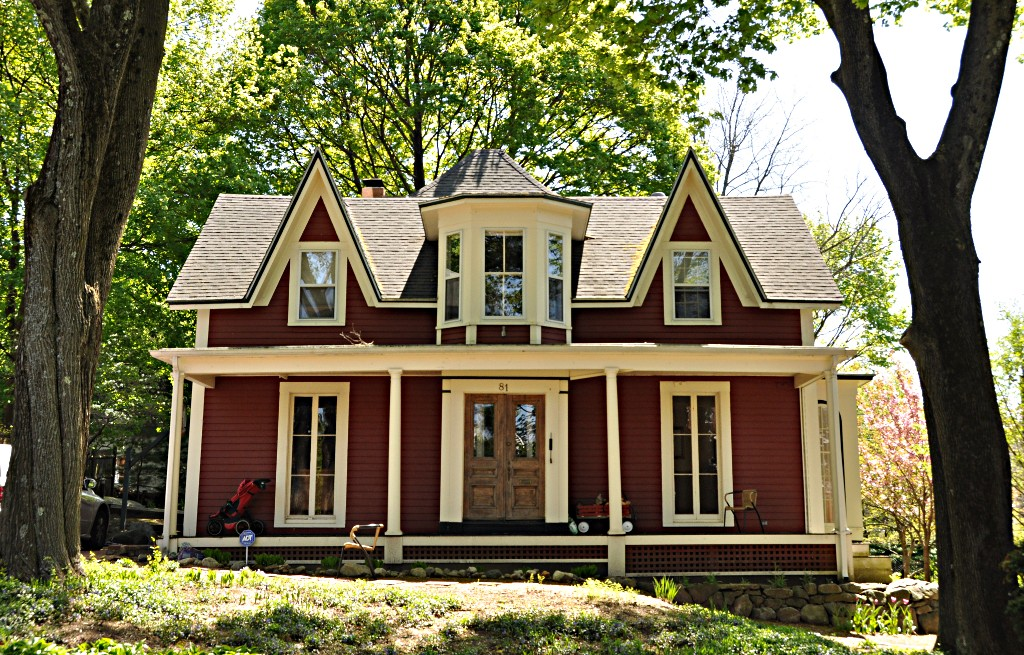

- Location within Massachusetts Location within the United States
- Location: 81 Walnut Street, Winchester, Massachusetts
- Coordinates: 42°27′3″N 71°8′19″W
- Built: 1835
- Architectural style: Gothic Revival
- MPS: Winchester MRA
- NRHP reference No.: 89000619
- Added to NRHP: July 5, 1989

The Abijah Thompson House is a historic house in Winchester, Massachusetts.

== History ==
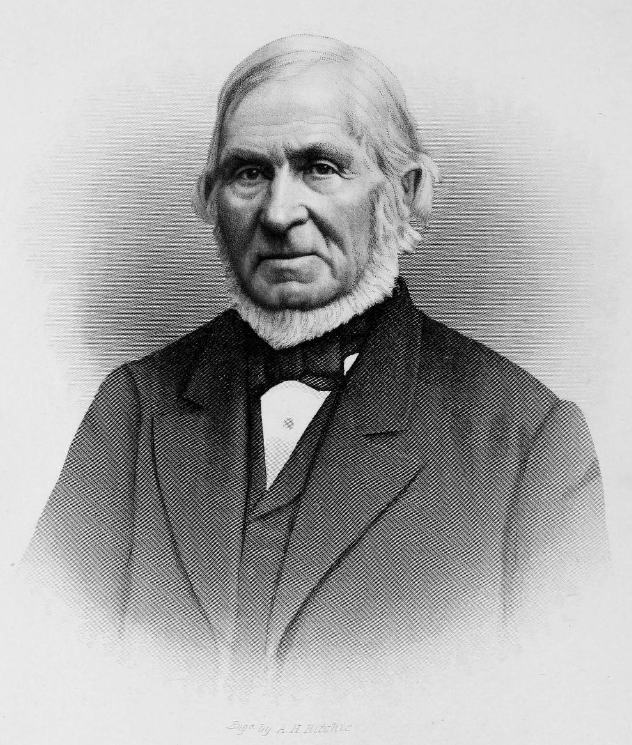
Abijah Thompson (1793–1868)

The 1.5-story wood-frame house was built sometime between 1835 and 1850, and is a fine local example of Gothic Revival style. Its first documented owner, Abijah Thompson, was the first president of the Winchester Historical Society.

The house bears resemblance to other Gothic Revival cottages in Wellesley and Newton, particularly because of the central polygonal bay, which is flanked by steeply pitched gables. It is also somewhat similar to the Moore House at 85 Walnut Street.

The house was added to the National Register of Historic Places in 1989.

== See also ==
- National Register of Historic Places listings in Winchester, Massachusetts
