= Moores Springs, North Carolina =

Moores Springs
- Unincorporated community
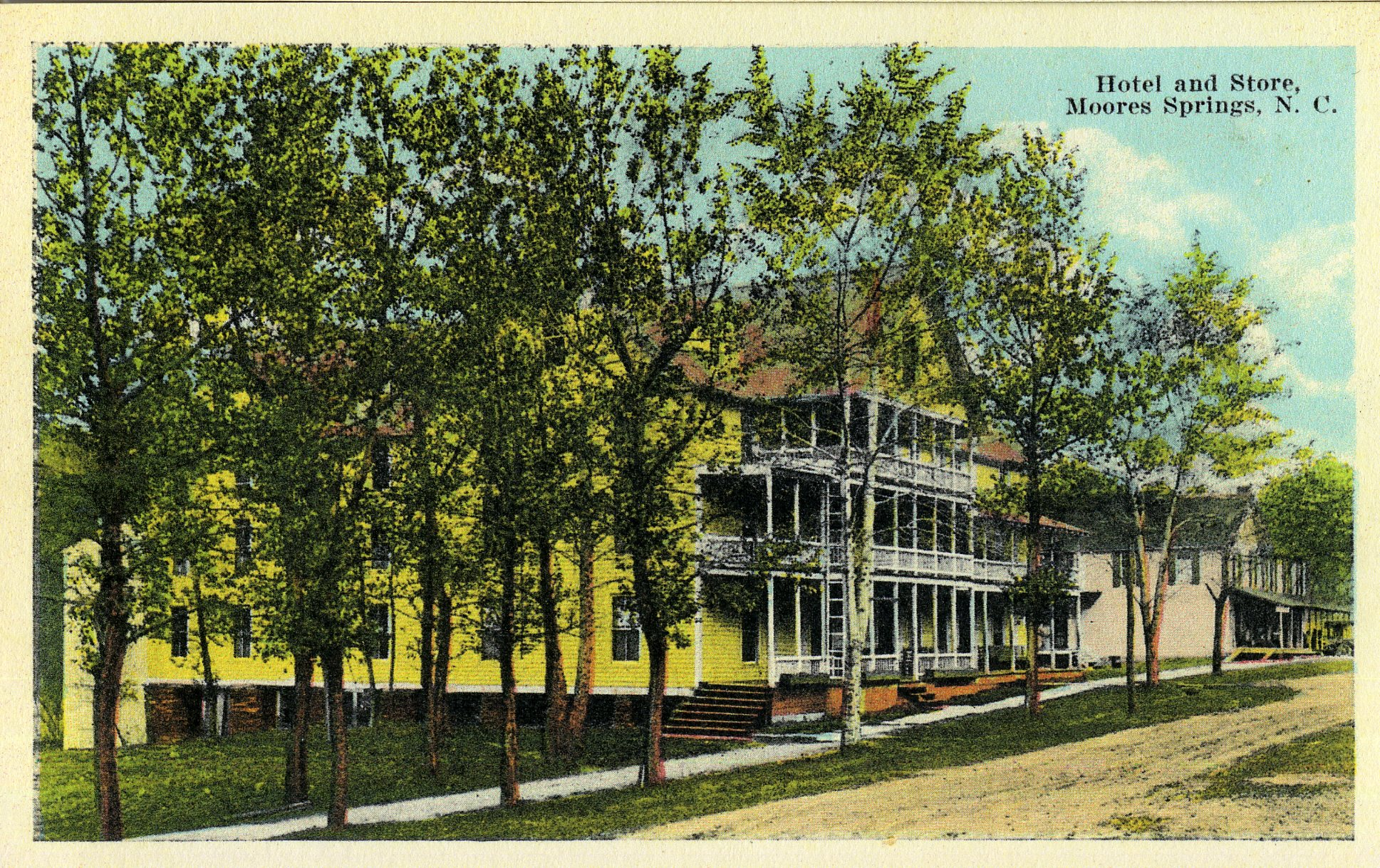
- Postcard depicting Moores Springs Hotel in Moores Springs, ca 1915

- Location within the state of North Carolina
- Coordinates: 36°25′16″N 80°17′20″W
- Country: United States
- State: North Carolina
- County: Stokes
- Time zone: UTC-5 (Eastern (EST))
  - Summer (DST): UTC-4 (EDT)

Moores Springs is an unincorporated community in Stokes County, North Carolina, United States, approximately five miles west-northwest of Danbury, near Hanging Rock State Park. It is becoming well known for its mountain biking trails and access to the Dan River.

The Matthew Moore House was added to the National Register of Historic Places in 1974.
