= Moore-Mann House =

Historic house in South Carolina, United States

- U.S. National Register of Historic Places
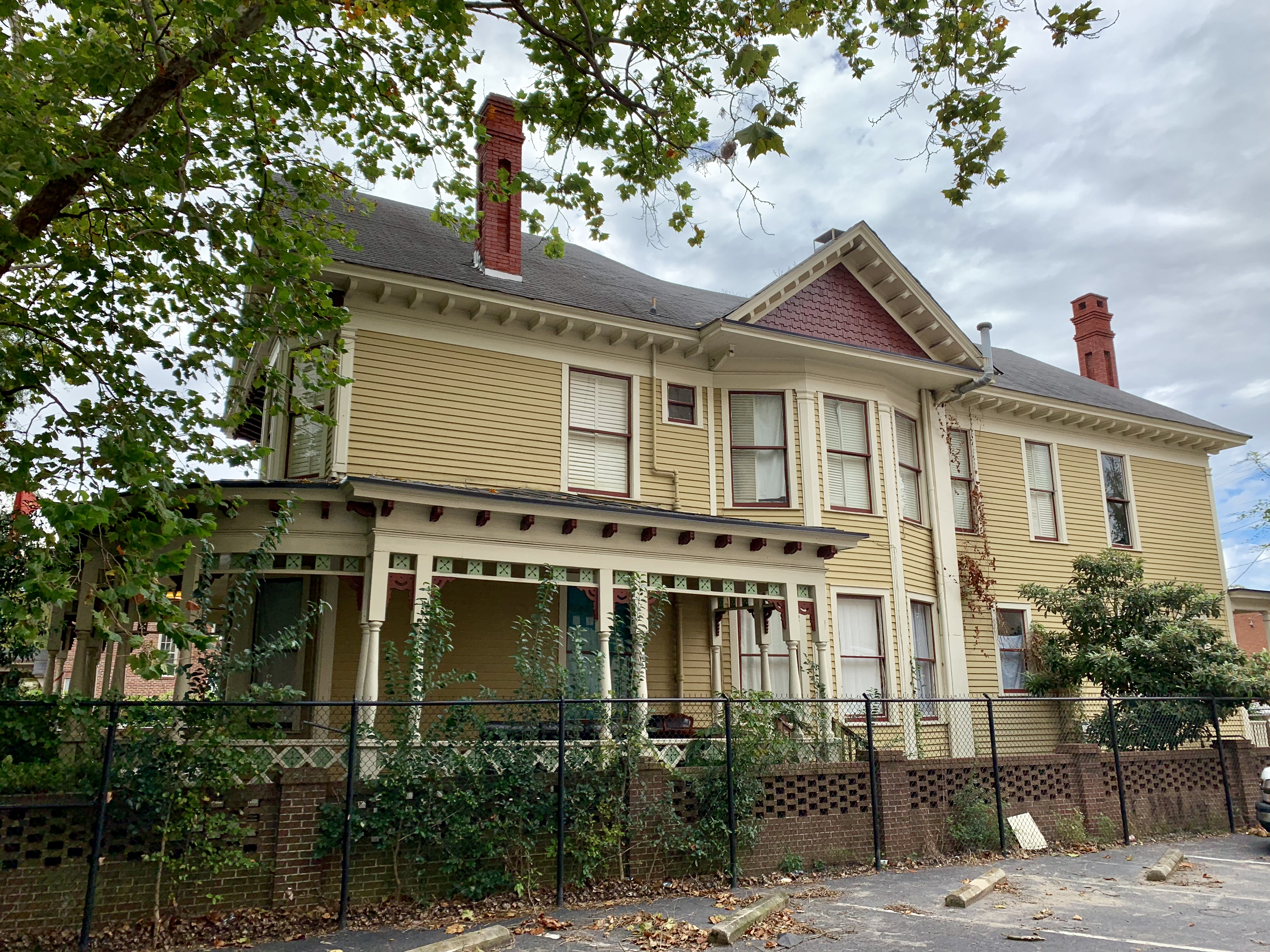

- Location within South Carolina Location within the United States
- Location: 1611 Hampton St. Columbia, South Carolina
- Coordinates: 34°0′27″N 81°1′43″W
- Area: 0.3 acres (0.12 ha)
- Built: 1903
- Architect: Whaley, W.B. Smith, & Co.
- Architectural style: Queen Anne
- MPS: Columbia MRA
- NRHP reference No.: 79003363
- Added to NRHP: March 2, 1979

Moore-Mann House is a historic home located at Columbia, South Carolina. It built about 1903, and is a 2 1/2-story, irregular plan, Queen Anne style frame dwelling. It features a one-story verandah, bay windows, decorative shingles and an arched entrance. It was designed by W. B. Smith Whaley, Co., a prominent Columbia architectural and engineering firm, whose owner also built the W. B. Smith Whaley House.

It was added to the National Register of Historic Places in 1979.
