= Moore House (Poughkeepsie, New York) =

Historic house in New York, United States

- U.S. National Register of Historic Places
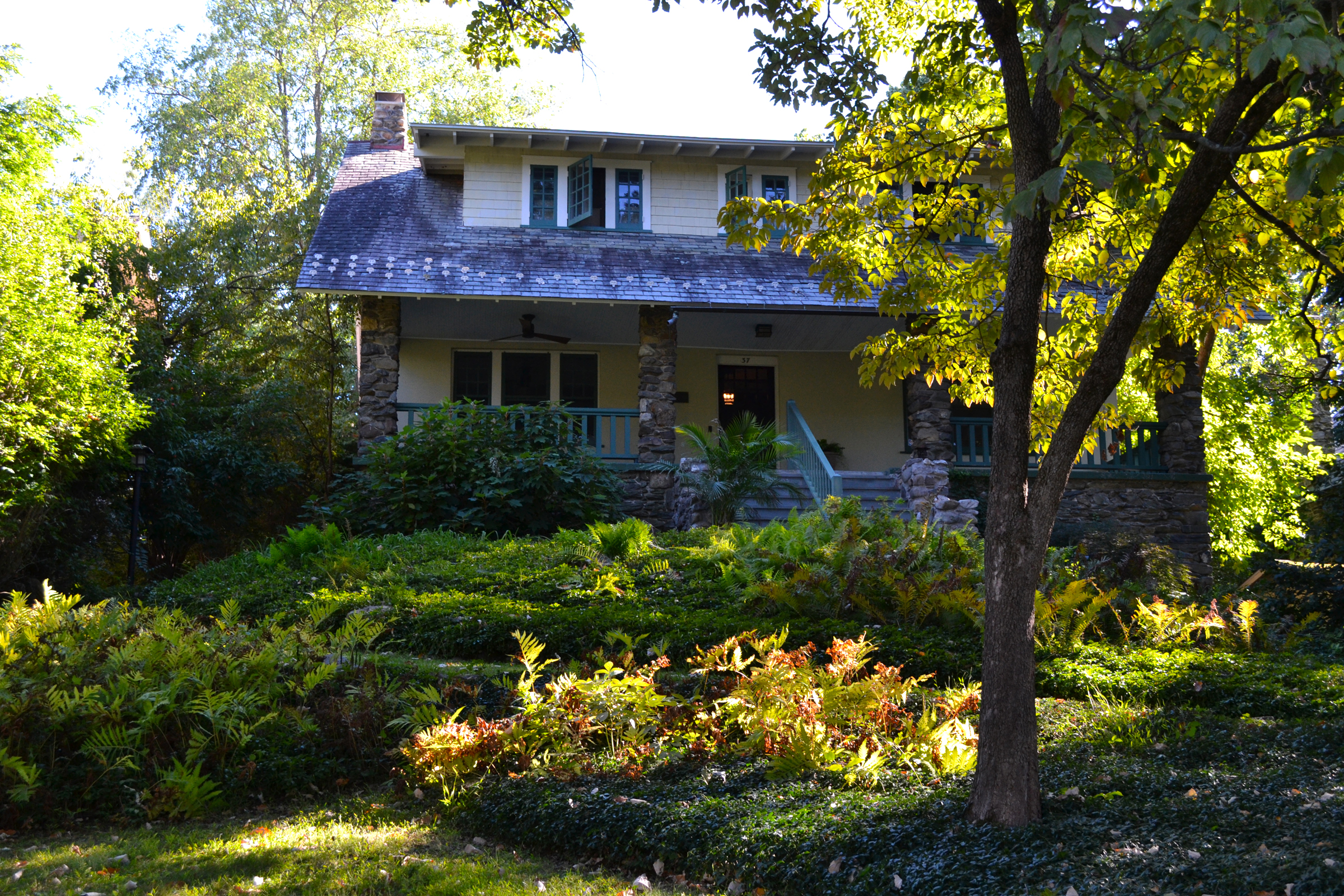
- The house in September 2015

- Location within New York Location within the United States
- Location: 37 Adriance Ave., Poughkeepsie, New York
- Coordinates: 41°41′27″N 73°55′28″W
- Area: less than one acre
- Built: 1910
- Architect: Carpenter, DuBois; Poughkeepsie Engineering & Contrac
- Architectural style: Bungalow/Craftsman
- MPS: Poughkeepsie MRA
- NRHP reference No.: 82001150
- Added to NRHP: November 26, 1982

Moore House is a historic home located at Poughkeepsie, Dutchess County, New York. It was built about 1910 and is a 1 1/2-story, three-bay-wide bungalow-style dwelling with a sweeping, slate-covered roof with dormer. It is stucco and features a broad front porch supported by massive stone piers.

It was added to the National Register of Historic Places in 1982.
