= Moore Family Farm =

- U.S. National Register of Historic Places
- U.S. Historic district
- Location within Tennessee Location within the United States
- Nearest city: Bulls Gap, Tennessee
- Coordinates: 36.26698°N 83.06733°W
- Area: 345.8 acres (139.9 ha)
- Built: 1866
- Architectural style: I-house
- NRHP reference No.: 06000343
- Added to NRHP: May 3, 2006

The Moore Family Farm is a farm in Hawkins County, Tennessee, that is listed on the National Register of Historic Places as a historic district.

The Moore family settled on the property in about 1834 and still maintained it as a working farm as of 2006, when it was listed on the National Register. The listing included 29 contributing properties.

Buildings on the property are described as representative of "vernacular building traditions in the region".
