= Moore House (Winchester, Massachusetts) =

Historic house in Massachusetts, United States

- U.S. National Register of Historic Places
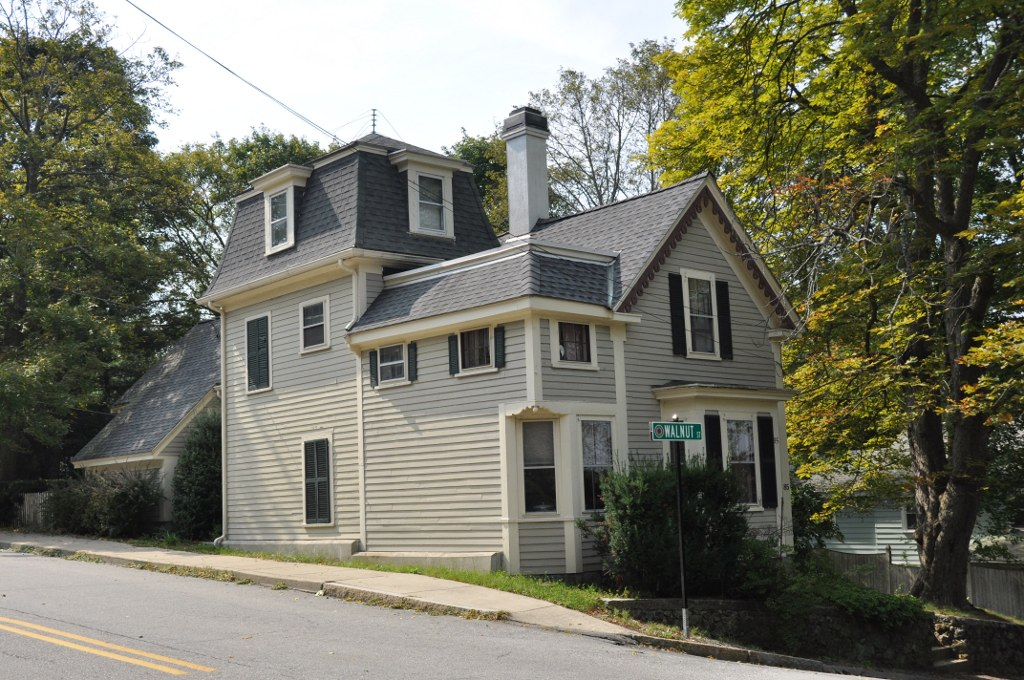

- Location within Massachusetts Location within the United States
- Location: 85 Walnut Street, Winchester, Massachusetts
- Coordinates: 42°27′4″N 71°7′49″W
- Built: 1845
- Architectural style: Gothic Revival
- MPS: Winchester MRA
- NRHP reference No.: 89000620
- Added to NRHP: July 5, 1989

The Moore House is a historic house in Winchester, Massachusetts. The 1 1/2-story Gothic Revival house was probably built sometime in the 1840s, possibly by George Moore, a local builder whose family was listed as resident there 1865–1931.

The house is distinctive for having three steeply pitched gable dormers in front, decorated with vergeboard, and for a small mansard-roofed tower added to the rear in the 1870s. The single-story front porch has a flat roof, with a decorative jigsawn valance.

The house was listed on the National Register of Historic Places in 1989.

== See also ==
- Abijah Thompson House, at 81 Walnut Street
- National Register of Historic Places listings in Winchester, Massachusetts
