= Matthew Moore House =

Historic house in North Carolina, United States

- U.S. National Register of Historic Places
- Location within North Carolina Location within the United States
- Location: W of Danbury, Moores Springs, North Carolina
- Coordinates: 36°26′6″N 80°17′32″W
- Area: 9 acres (3.6 ha)
- Built: c. 1786
- Built by: Moore, Matthew
- NRHP reference No.: 74001375
- Added to NRHP: October 29, 1974

Matthew Moore House is a historic home located at 1443 Dan George Road in Moores Springs, Stokes County, North Carolina. It was built about 1786, and is a small 1 1/2-story brick cottage on a raised fieldstone basement. It has segmental-arched openings and the interior follows a simple Quaker plans. It was the home of Matthew Moore, an early and prominent settler and a large landowner in Stokes County. It is the oldest brick home in Stokes County. Gabriel Moore, who served as governor of Alabama, was raised here. It was added to the National Register of Historic Places in 1974.
