= Moore House (Locust Hill, North Carolina) =

Historic house in North Carolina, United States

- U.S. National Register of Historic Places
- Location within North Carolina Location within the United States
- Location: E of Locust Hill off U.S. 158, near Locust Hill, North Carolina
- Coordinates: 36°22′12″N 79°25′44″W
- Area: 9.5 acres (3.8 ha)
- Built: c. 1790
- Architectural style: Federal
- NRHP reference No.: 73001304
- Added to NRHP: August 28, 1973

Moore House, also known as Stamp's Quarter, is a historic home located near Locust Hill, Caswell County, North Carolina. It was built about 1790, and is a two-story, three-bay, Federal-style brick dwelling. It is set on a full, raised basement, has exterior end chimneys, and a low hipped roof.

It was added to the National Register of Historic Places in 1973.
