= Arthur W. Moore House =

Historic house in North Carolina, United States

- U.S. National Register of Historic Places
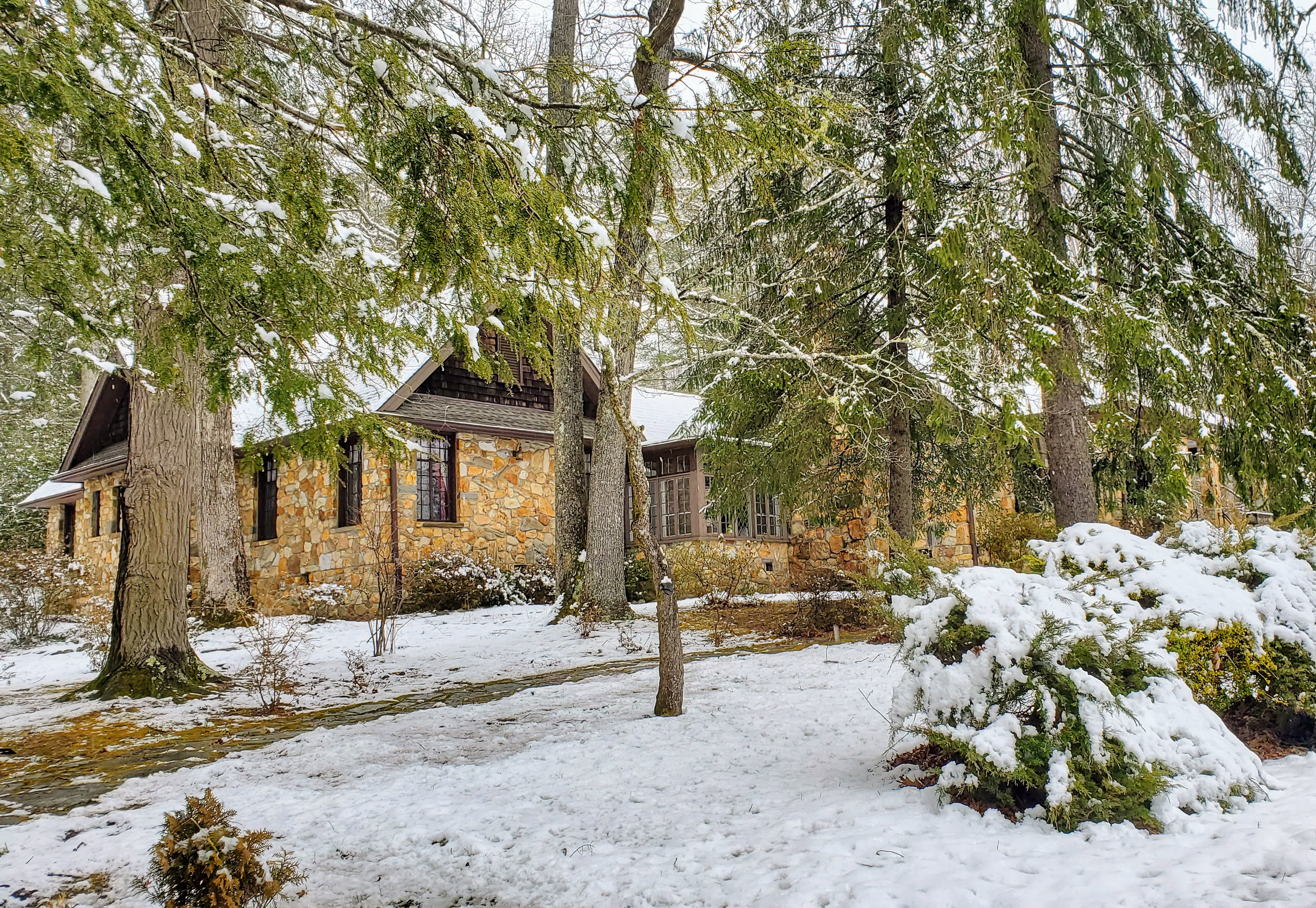
- Location: , near Horse Shoe, North Carolina
- Area: 2.8 acres (1.1 ha)
- Built: 1936
- Built by: Drake, Albert
- Architectural style: Craftsman-influenced
- NRHP reference No.: 00001613
- Added to NRHP: January 4, 2001

Arthur W. Moore House, also known as Rockhaven, is a historic home located near Horse Shoe, Henderson County, North Carolina. It was built in 1936, and is a one-story, "U"-shaped masonry dwelling with American Craftsman style design elements. It rests on a stone and brick foundation, a river rock exterior, and has a tile roof. Also on the property is the contributing original rock garden landscape (1936) and storage shed (c. 1942). It was built as the summer residence for Arthur W. Moore.

It was listed on the National Register of Historic Places in 2001.
