= Eli Morse Sawmill Foundations =

- U.S. National Register of Historic Places
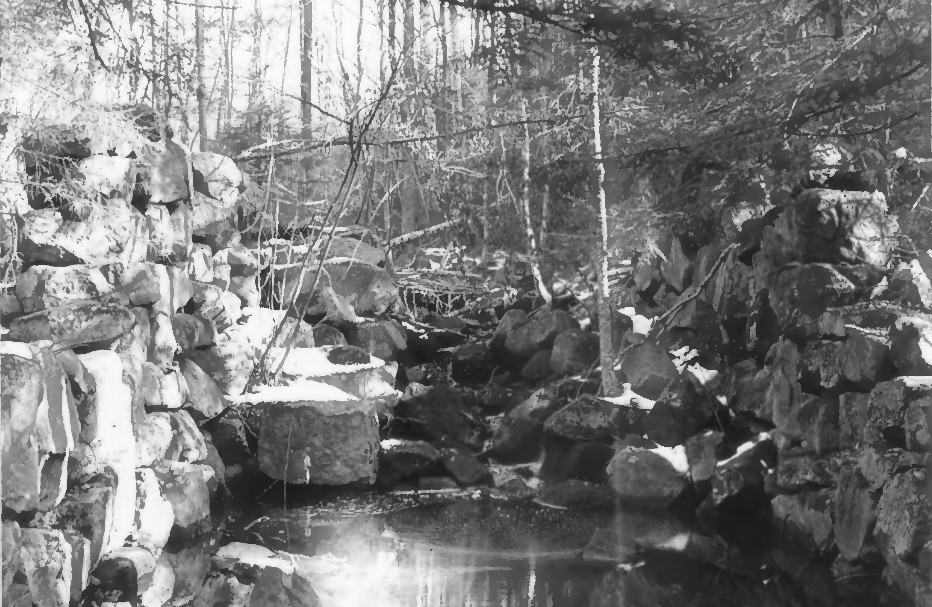
- View of mill foundations, 1981

- Location within New Hampshire Location within the United States
- Location: Off Old Marlborough Rd., Dublin, New Hampshire
- Coordinates: 42°53′57″N 72°5′31″W
- Area: 0.2 acres (0.081 ha)
- Built: 1765
- Built by: Morse, Eli
- MPS: Dublin MRA
- NRHP reference No.: 83004056
- Added to NRHP: December 18, 1983

The Eli Morse Sawmill Foundations are the surviving remnant of the first industrial site in Dublin, New Hampshire. The site is located astride a stream, near an old logging road, in a wooded area south of Old Marlborough Road, not far from the Eli Morse Farm. It consists of four foundation walls made of dry laid granite boulders. The northern wall measures about 10 feet (3.0 m), and the others measure about 23 feet (7.0 m). To the west of the main mill's foundations are smaller foundations of extensions or outbuildings.

The foundations are the only surviving elements of a sawmill erected c. 1765 by Eli Morse, one of Dublin's first settlers and a prominent participant in the town's civic affairs. The proprietors of the town offered Morse financial incentives to build the mill in 1764; he is also credited with building the town's first grist mill a few years later. This mill was operated by Morse and later his son Peter, who died in an accident at the site. The mill is known to have ceased operation by 1886.

The mill site was listed on the National Register of Historic Places in 1983.

== See also ==
- National Register of Historic Places listings in Cheshire County, New Hampshire
