= Moorhouse (surname) =

Moorhouse is a surname. Originating in Normandy, France. It was carried to England in 1066, when Norsemen helped William the Conqueror seize the English Crown. As a reward, they were given lands in Lancashire. Progressing to Yorkshire and eventually to Ireland, the Moorhouse surname came to Canada in the 1700s, with William Moorhouse settling in Ontario, Canada. The Moorhouse surname progressed to the United States and Australia from England.

Notable people with the surname include:

- Adrian Moorhouse (born 1964), English swimmer
- Anna Moorhouse (born 1995), English footballer
- Anthony Moorhouse (1935–1956), British soldier kidnapped and killed in Port Said after the Suez Crisis
- Bert Moorhouse (1894–1954), American actor
- Frank Moorhouse (1938–2022), Australian writer
- Geoffrey Moorhouse (1931–2009), British author
- George Moorhouse (1901–1943), American-British footballer
- Harry Moorhouse (1872–1934), British Army officer and cricketer
- James Moorhouse (1826–1915), Anglican Bishop of Melbourne and Manchester
- James Moorhouse (politician) (1924–2014), British politician
- Jason Moorhouse, Manx politician
- Justin Moorhouse (born 1970), comedian and broadcaster
- Kathleen Moorhouse, British cellist (c 1900–1952)
- Kathleen Margaret "Peg" Moorhouse (1917–2024), New Zealand weaver and artist
- Len Moorhouse (1904–1970), New Zealand representative swimmer
- Malcolm Moorhouse (1866–1955), English-born cricketer in New Zealand
- Matilda Moorhouse Barratt (1837–1902), a prominent member of The Church of Jesus Christ of Latter-day Saints
- Matthew Moorhouse (1813–1876), medical practitioner, pastoralist, civil servant and the first Protector of Aborigines in South Australia
- Robert Moorhouse (1866–1921), English cricketer
- Roger Moorhouse (born 1968), historian
- Stan Moorhouse (1891–1951), British rugby league footballer
- William Sefton Moorhouse (c. 1825–1881), New Zealand politician
- William Barnard Rhodes-Moorhouse (1887–1915), his nephew, the first airman to be awarded the Victoria Cross

== See also ==
- Moorehouse, a surname
- Morehouse (disambiguation)
