= Morehouse Lake =

- Location within New York Morehouse Lake (the United States)
- Location: Hamilton County, New York, United States
- Coordinates: 43°21′48″N 74°40′44″W
- Type: Lake
- Basin countries: United States
- Surface area: 106 acres (0.43 km^{2})
- Surface elevation: 1,982 feet (604 m)

Morehouse Lake is a lake that is located in Hamilton County in New York.
