= Susan J. Armistead Moore House =

Historic house in North Carolina, United States

- U.S. National Register of Historic Places
- Location within North Carolina Location within the United States
- Location: NC 32, 0.25 miles W of jct. with NC 37, near Edenton, North Carolina
- Coordinates: 36°1′50″N 76°32′16″W
- Area: 20 acres (8.1 ha)
- Built: c. 1853
- Architectural style: Greek Revival
- NRHP reference No.: 05000436
- Added to NRHP: May 18, 2005

Susan J. Armistead Moore House, also known as Poplar Neck and Jubilee Farm, is a historic home located near Edenton, Chowan County, North Carolina. It was built about 1853, and is a 2 1/2-story, three-bay, double-pile Greek Revival-style frame dwelling. It features engaged, tiered porches across both the front and rear elevations.

It was listed on the National Register of Historic Places in 2005.
