= Simeon Moore House =

Historic house in Kentucky, United States

- U.S. National Register of Historic Places
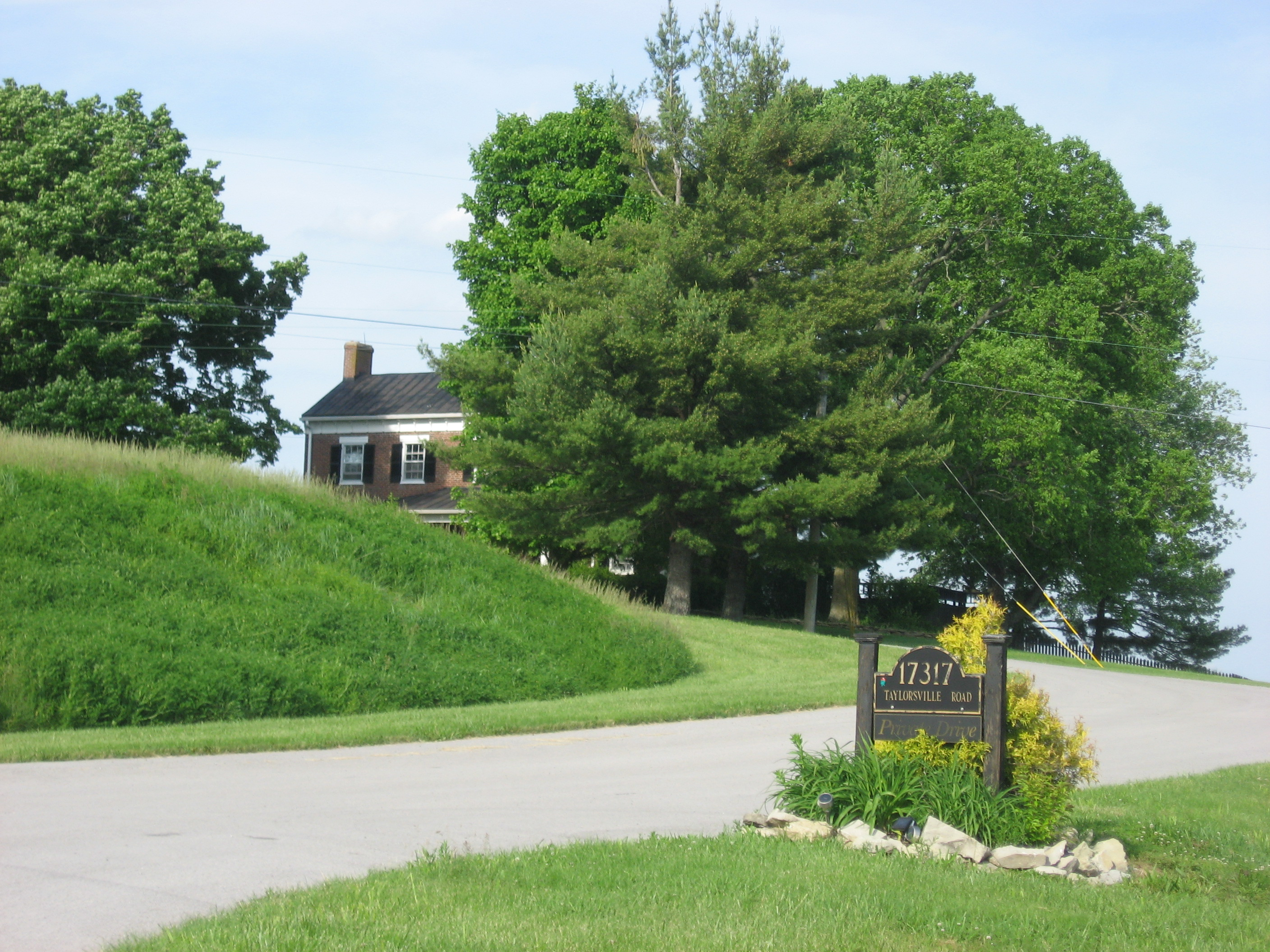
- View from Taylorsville Road

- Location within Kentucky Location within the United States
- Nearest city: Fisherville, Louisville, Kentucky
- Coordinates: 38°09′29″N 85°26′04″W
- Built: circa 1850
- Architectural style: Greek Revival
- NRHP reference No.: 80001581
- Added to NRHP: December 5, 1980

Simeon Moore House, also known as Cane Run Farm, is a historic house and farmstead located along Cane Run on Taylorsville Road, in the Fisherville neighborhood of Louisville, Kentucky. It was listed on the National Register of Historic Places in 1980.

The Simeon Moore house was built by widower Simeon Moore (1804–1873) in about 1850. He had purchased 134 acres in far eastern Jefferson County in 1836 and added 77 more acres to his farm in 1850, the year he is believed to have built his home. Simeon's wife Jane (Carrithers) Moore died in 1838 at the age of 27, leaving him with at least five children. The Moores' son Charles inherited the house at his father's death and owned it until about 1900 when it was sold out of the family.

The house is a 5-bay brick I-House in design with Greek Revival interior detailing which is substantially intact. The original house is unaltered in plan and consists of one room on either side of a central stair hall on each floor. A modern kitchen ell to the rear of the house replaces an earlier kitchen and porch addition. An early 20th century front porch was replaced in recent years. The form of the house is common in the area but the brick is laid in a bond pattern said to be unique in Jefferson County. The penciled mortar joints are similar to those at the Presley Tyler House at the Blackacre Nature Preserve and Historic Homestead. The property includes two vernacular frame barns, a root cellar, a corn crib converted to an office and garage, and a modern garage.
