= Moore House (Little Rock, Arkansas) =

Historic house in Arkansas, United States

- U.S. National Register of Historic Places
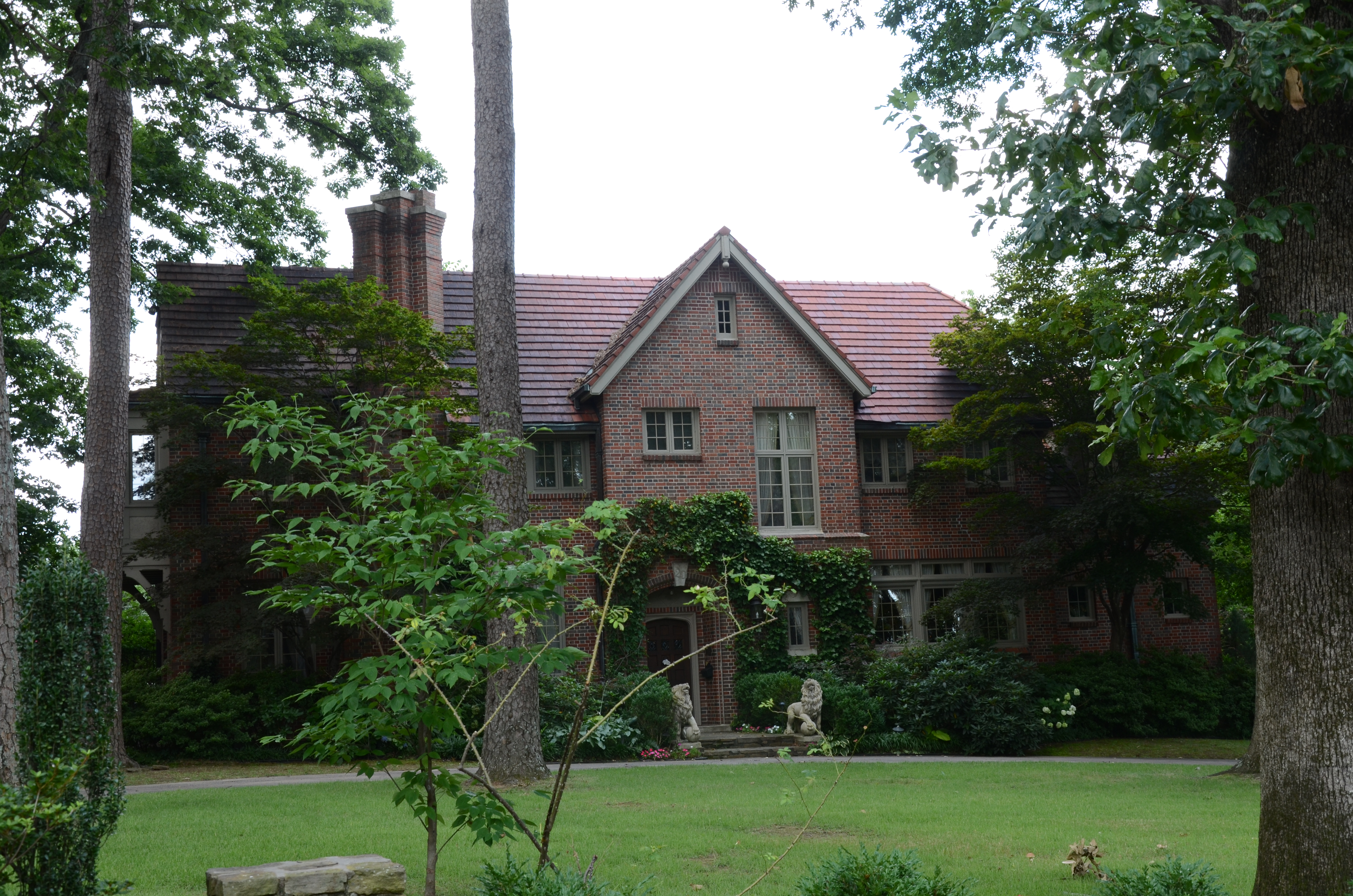

- Location within Arkansas Location within the United States
- Location: 20 Armistead, Little Rock, Arkansas
- Coordinates: 34°46′0″N 92°19′23″W
- Area: less than one acre
- Built: 1929
- Architect: Thompson, Sanders, & Ginocchio
- Architectural style: Tudor Revival
- MPS: Thompson, Charles L., Design Collection TR
- NRHP reference No.: 82000911
- Added to NRHP: December 22, 1982

The Moore House is a historic house at 20 Armistead Street in Little Rock, Arkansas. It is a 2 1/2-story rambling brick structure, built in 1929 to a design by Thompson, Sanders & Ginocchio. It has stylistic elements of the Tudor Revival then popular, including a tile roof, cross-gable above the main entrance, clustered chimneys with corbelled detailing, and asymmetrical arrangements of mostly casement windows. The house was listed on the National Register of Historic Places in 1982.

== See also ==
- National Register of Historic Places listings in Little Rock, Arkansas
