= W. B. Smith Whaley House =

Historic house in South Carolina, United States

- U.S. National Register of Historic Places
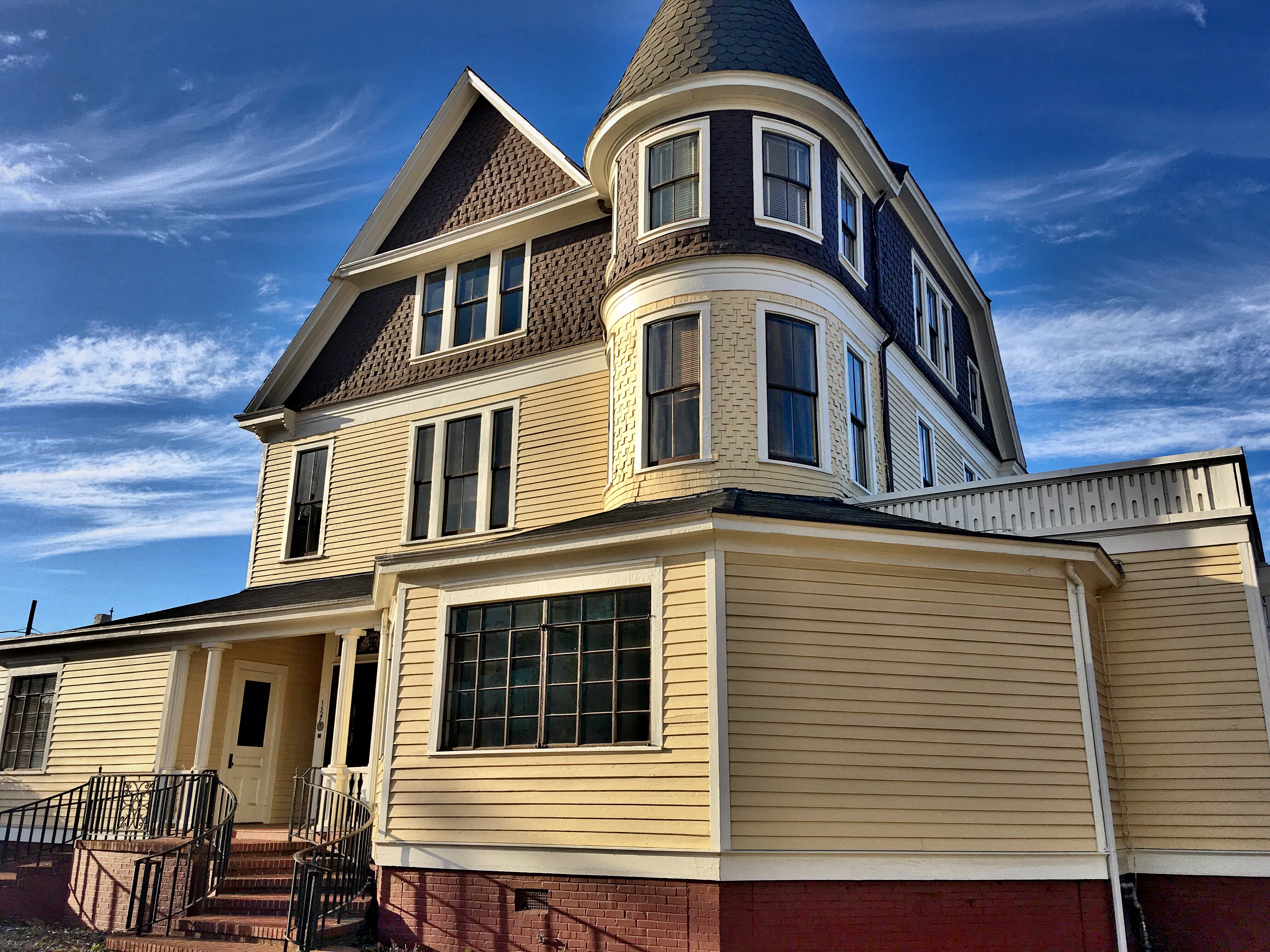

- Location within South Carolina Location within the United States
- Location: 1527 Gervais St., Columbia, South Carolina
- Coordinates: 34°0′11″N 81°1′40″W
- Area: 0.6 acres (0.24 ha)
- Built: 1892-1893
- Built by: Whaley, W.B. Smith
- Architectural style: Queen Anne
- MPS: Columbia MRA
- NRHP reference No.: 79003362
- Added to NRHP: March 2, 1979

W. B. Smith Whaley House, also known as the Dunbar Funeral Home, is a historic home located at Columbia, South Carolina, United States. It built in 1892–1893, and is a three-story, irregular plan, Queen Anne style frame dwelling. It features a corner turret with conical roof and a long curving enclosed front porch. It was built by W. B. Smith Whaley, president of the Columbia Electric Street Railway and Mill Stable Company. In 1924, it became the Dunbar Funeral Home.

It was added to the National Register of Historic Places in 1979.
