= Charles H. Moore House =

Historic house in Ohio, United States

- U.S. National Register of Historic Places
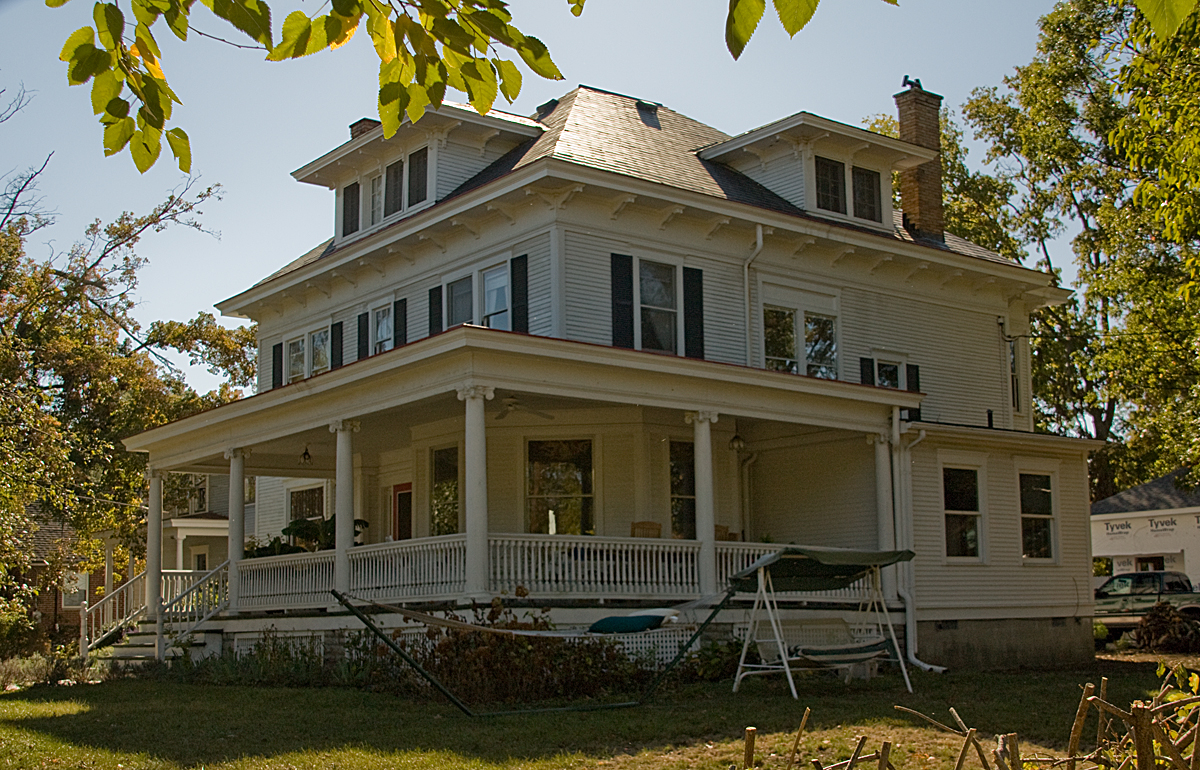
- Front and side of the house

- Location within Ohio Location within the United States
- Location: 749 Stout Ave., Wyoming, Ohio
- Coordinates: 39°13′55″N 84°28′11″W
- Area: 0.4 acres (0.16 ha)
- Built: 1910
- Architectural style: Colonial Revival, American Foursquare
- MPS: Wyoming MRA
- NRHP reference No.: 86001636
- Added to NRHP: August 25, 1986

The Charles H. Moore House is a historic residence in the city of Wyoming, Ohio, United States. Built in 1910 and home for a short time to a leading oilman, it has been designated a historic site.

== Charles Moore ==
Owner and president of the Moore Oil Company, Charles H. Moore was one of many wealthy men who lived in Wyoming and commuted to high-placed jobs in Cincinnati's economy. He only inhabited the house a short time before dying in 1911; following his death, it was sold to Ray and Mary Dollings, who resided on the property until 1937.

== Historic context ==
Good transportation is a leading reason for Wyoming's prosperity. The city lies near the old pre-statehood road that connected Cincinnati with locations farther north, such as Fort Hamilton and Fallen Timbers. Curves in the road were cut off in 1806, forming a new road that is today followed by Springfield Pike through central Wyoming. Improvements in the 1830s only enhanced its importance. By this time, another mode of transportation had become significant: the Miami and Erie Canal was built a short distance to the east in 1828, and the village of Lockland grew up along its side. Railroads reached the city in 1851 with the construction of the Cincinnati, Hamilton, and Dayton Railroad on the border between Lockland and Wyoming.

Because of Wyoming's proximity to the industry of Lockland, its easy transportation to the booming city of Cincinnati, and its pleasant scenery, many wealthy industrialists purchased local farms and built grand country houses. Most such houses were built in the Wyoming Hills area, west of Springfield Pike; growth in this area continued until the coming of the Great Depression.

== Architecture ==
Built in 1910 and designed by an unknown person, the Moore House is a weatherboarded building of two and a half stories resting atop a stone foundation. Brick details the structure, which is topped with a hip roof pierced with dormer windows on multiple sides, covered with slates, and supported with a cornice of brackets. A wrap-around porch with Ionic columns forms much of the facade, sheltering the first floor and providing support to the second. Were the porch removed, an overhang would be present on the right side of the house, as seen from the street. Underneath the porch, the first floor includes a prominent bay window to the right of the main entrance, which sits in the center of the facade. The overall shape of the house makes it typical of the American Foursquare style; this style was common in Wyoming's Village neighborhood, which was home to residents of more typical income than the wealthy denizens of the Wyoming Hills.

== Historic site ==
In 1979, a local historic preservation group began a citywide survey to identify Wyoming's historic buildings, and this effort culminated with a multiple property submission of eighteen houses, the Wyoming Presbyterian Church, and one historic district (the Village) to the National Register of Historic Places in 1985. As part of this grouping, the Charles H. Moore House was listed on the Register in the following year, qualifying both because of its important architecture and because of its prominent original resident.
