= Morehouse, Ohio =

Coordinates: 40°24′25″N 82°54′03″W

Morehouse is a ghost town in Morrow County, in the U.S. state of Ohio.

== History ==
The first settlement at Morehouse was made in the 1830s by Stephen Morehouse. The town once had its own schoolhouse.
