= Rev. William Dudley Moore House =

- U.S. National Register of Historic Places
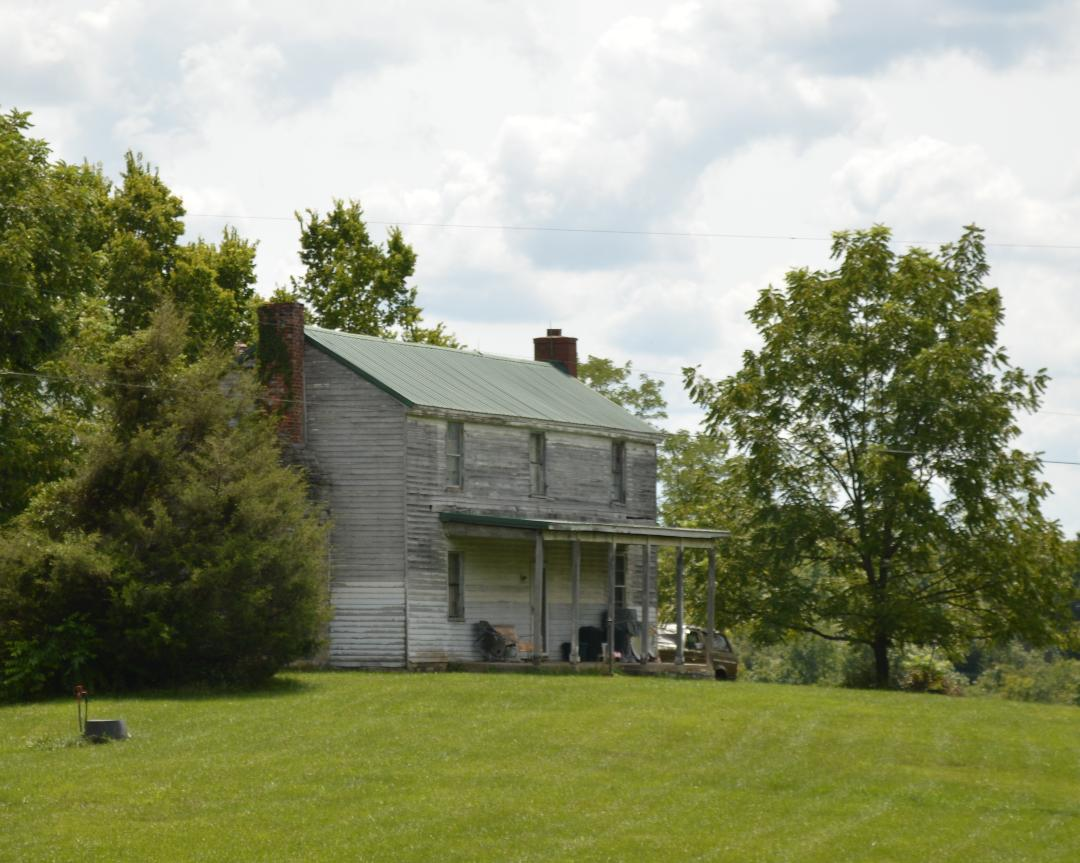

- Location within Kentucky Location within the United States
- Location: Kentucky Route 425, 4 miles (6.4 km) south of Lawrenceburg, Kentucky
- Coordinates: 37°59′00″N 84°52′31″W
- Area: 10 acres (4.0 ha)
- Built: c.1848-50
- Architectural style: I-house
- NRHP reference No.: 79000958
- Added to NRHP: February 21, 1979

The Rev. William Dudley Moore House, in Anderson County, Kentucky near Lawrenceburg, was built in c.1848-50. It was listed on the National Register of Historic Places in 1979. The listing included seven contributing buildings and two contributing structures.

The main house is an I-house, and has remained unaltered since 1900. It was the lifelong home of Reverend Moore, a well-known local minister who performed 928 marriages, 1400 funerals, and more than 1,000 baptisms during his 50-year career. According to the National Register of Historic Places, the property also includes eleven well-preserved frame outbuildings constructed no later than 1900.
