= Moorehouse =

Moorehouse is a surname. Notable people with the surname include:

- Alan Moorehouse Charlesworth (1904–1978), a senior commander in the Royal Australian Air Force
- Daina Moorehouse (born 2001), Irish boxer
- Francis Moorehouse (died 1982), an American labor relations specialist
- Jonah Moorehouse Webster, Canadian politician
- Ruth Ann "Ouisch" Moorehouse (born 1951), member of the criminal Manson Family

== See also ==
- Moore House (disambiguation)
- Moorhouse (surname)
- Morehouse (disambiguation)
