= R. T. Moore House =

Historic house in Louisiana, United States

- U.S. National Register of Historic Places
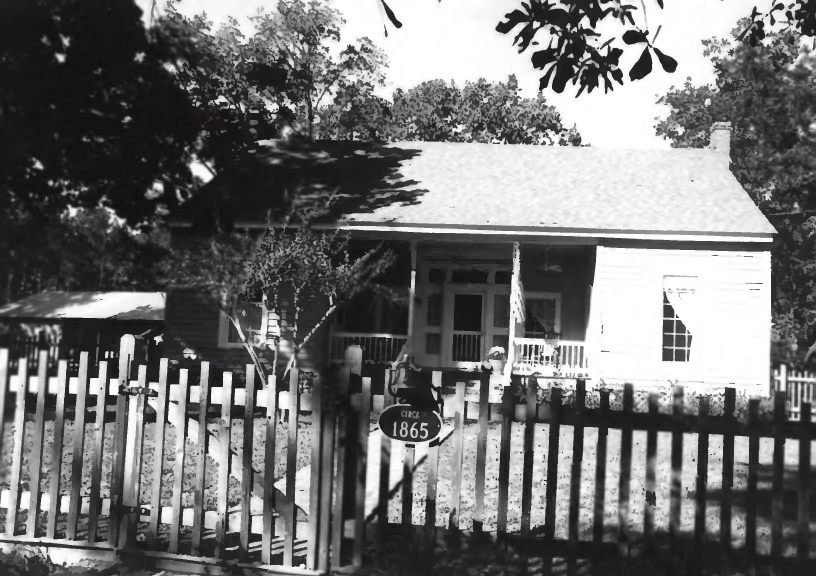

- Location within Louisiana Location within the United States
- Location: LA Hwv Alt. 2, about 2 miles west of U.S. Highway 167, near Bernice, Louisiana
- Coordinates: 32°50′40″N 92°40′52″W
- Area: less than one acre
- Built: c.1865, 1913
- Architectural style: Dogtrot house
- NRHP reference No.: 94000478
- Added to NRHP: May 19, 1994

The R. T. Moore House near Bernice, Louisiana was built in about 1865. It has also been known as Sweet Onion. It was listed on the National Register of Historic Places in 1994.

It is a 1 1/2-story frame farmhouse. It originally had a narrow dogtrot between two rooms with fireplaces. A stairway was replaced in 1903 and an L-shaped kitchen wing was added in 1913.
