= Thomas Moore House (Indianapolis, Indiana) =

Historic house in Indiana, United States

- U.S. National Register of Historic Places
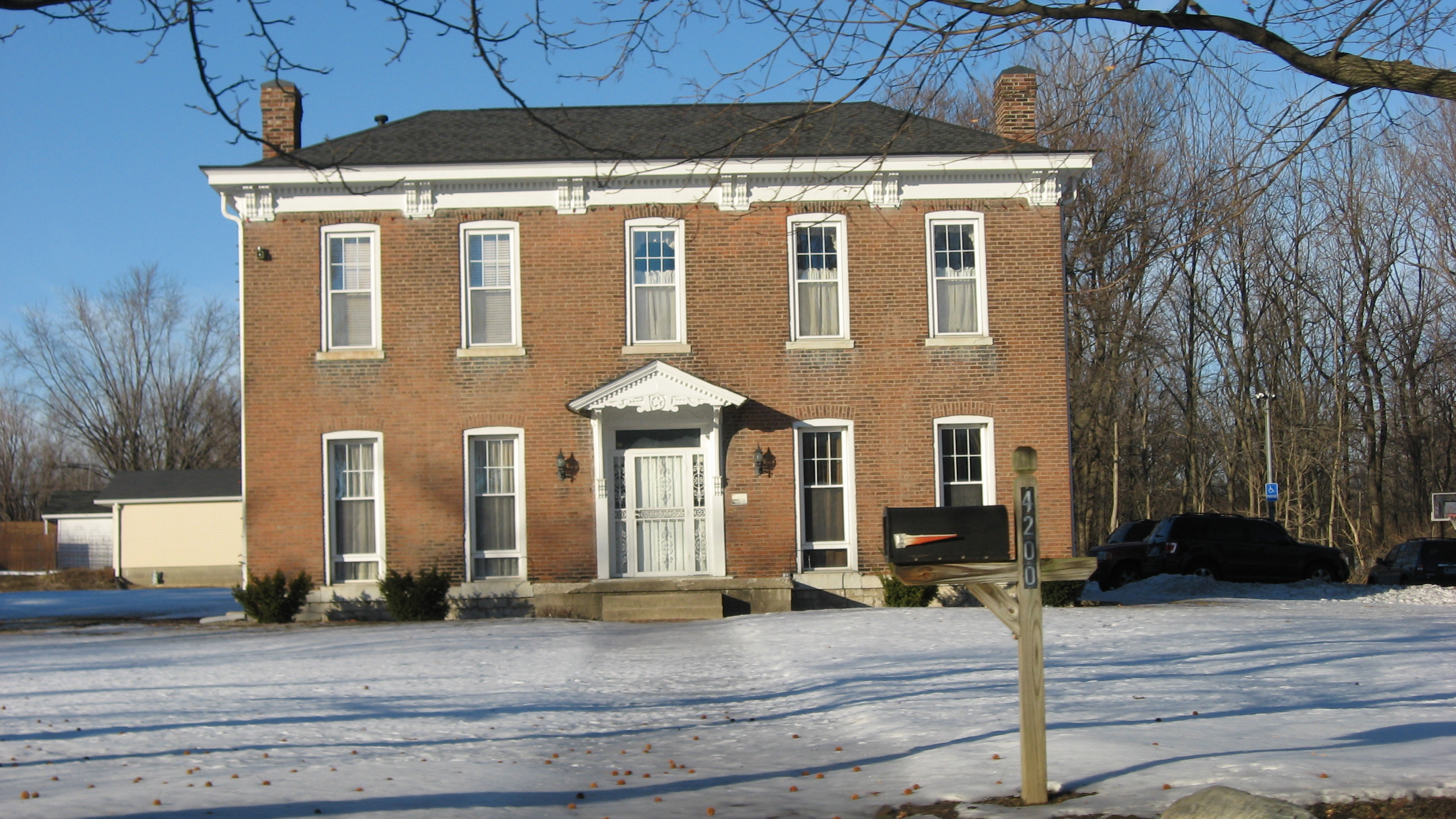
- Thomas Moore House, February 2011

- Location within Indianapolis Location within Indiana Location within the United States
- Location: 4200 Brookville Rd., Indianapolis, Indiana
- Coordinates: 39°45′54″N 86°5′43″W
- Area: less than one acre
- Architectural style: Italianate
- NRHP reference No.: 84001137
- Added to NRHP: March 15, 1984

Thomas Moore House, also known as the Moore-Christian House, is a historic home located at 4200 Brookville Road in Indianapolis, Indiana. It was built in the 19th century, and is a two-story, five-bay, L-shaped, Italianate style brick dwelling. It has a low hipped roof with double brackets and segmental arched openings. At the entrance is a gable roofed awning with large, ornate brackets and ornate Queen Anne style scrollwork design on the gable front.

It was listed on the National Register of Historic Places in 1984.

== Introduction ==
The Thomas Moore House – also known as the Moore-Christian House – is a historic farmhouse on the east side of Indianapolis, Indiana (Center Township, Marion County). Located at 4200 Brookville Road on the west bank of Pleasant Run creek, this brick dwelling was once the center of a large 19th-century farm. The home is noted for its Italianate style architecture, with a symmetrical five-bay façade, decorative wooden brackets, and segmental-arched windows, accented by later Queen Anne trim on the front porch gable. The property carries deep historic significance due to its association with one of Indianapolis's prominent early families (the Moore family, followed by the Christian family) and the role they played in local development. Today, the house stands as a rare survivor of the area's agrarian past, surrounded by a neighborhood that was once the Moore farm. It has been recognized for its historic value – protected by a preservation easement since 1979 and listed on the National Register of Historic Places in 1984.

== Moore farm and construction of the house ==
Thomas Moore, an Irish immigrant, arrived in the Indianapolis community in 1831 while working on the construction of the National Road. Indianapolis had been founded only a decade earlier (1821), and the National Road, which had reached Indianapolis by 1834, was expected to stimulate growth in central Indiana. Moore obtained a government land grant for a large tract about three miles (4.8 km) east of downtown, in what was then open countryside. According to family accounts, his land patents were signed by President Andrew Jackson, reflecting the early 1830s timeframe of his settlement. Thomas Moore established a livestock farm that would grow to be one of the area's earliest and most successful farming enterprises.

Construction of a substantial brick house on the Moore farm likely began in the 1830s, although the exact date remains uncertain. Moore's 1837 will mentions a "new dwelling house" under construction on the property, suggesting that a house was being built around that time. It is unclear, however, if the present structure is that same house or a later replacement. One historical account claimed that Moore's 1837 house was a larger six-bedroom structure (implying the existing house might be different), but the reliability of that claim is questionable. Another source, published in 1947, simply stated the house was built in 1841, though without documentation. Stylistic evidence provides mixed clues: the front façade shows Italianate characteristics typical of the mid-19th century, yet some features (like the pedimented interior door casings and classical fireplace surrounds) hint at Federal or Greek Revival influences, which were earlier 19th-century styles. Because the area was rural and early land records are vague, historians have not been able to conclusively date the structure. Most likely, the core of the house was completed around the late 1830s or early 1840s, evolving over time as architectural fashions changed. What is clear is that the house became the homestead of the Moore family's farm – a two-story, L-shaped brick residence built on a stone foundation, with thick 18-inch (460 mm) brick walls and originally equipped with eight fireplaces for heat.

== Moore family era (1830s–1860s) ==
Thomas Moore's farm flourished in the decades after Indianapolis's founding. Moore had chosen an advantageous location along Brookville Road (an early route heading southeast from the city) near the National Road, positioning him to serve the growing market of Indianapolis. He focused on raising livestock, and by the time of his death in 1838, Thomas Moore was regarded as one of the prominent citizens of the young capital city. Under his management, the farm specialized in breeding quality animals: Moore introduced shorthorn cattle and likely supplied beef or dairy products, and he raised carriage horses prized by locals for transportation and haulage. This emphasis on high-quality livestock would become a hallmark of the Moore farm in later years.

Upon Thomas Moore's death in 1838, his holdings passed to his son (also named Thomas Moore, often referred to as Thomas Jr.), who continued to operate and expand the family farm. Thomas Jr. upheld his father's legacy, becoming widely known for the excellent carriage horses and prize cattle he bred on the farm. These animals were likely sold in Indianapolis's markets or used to improve stock for other farmers, contributing to the region's agricultural development. The Moore farm, with its substantial acreage and fine livestock, was an important part of the local economy during this period when Indianapolis was transforming from a frontier settlement into a small but growing city. The Moore family's success also reflects the broader pattern of early Indianapolis growth – as the National Road and other infrastructure attracted settlers, farms like Moore's provided food, draft animals, and trade goods to the burgeoning town.

Daily life on the Moore farm in the mid-19th century would have centered around the rigorous chores and seasonal rhythms common to a working livestock farm. Family members and hired farmhands rose early to tend to the animals – feeding cattle and horses, cleaning stalls, and grooming the valuable horses. Fields of hay, corn, and oats were likely cultivated on the surrounding acreage to provide feed for the livestock. Work was physical and constant: workers mended fences, managed breeding of the stock, and possibly milked cows or butchered livestock for sale. A large iron dinner bell, installed under the eaves of the farmhouse when it was built, would ring out across the fields at mealtimes. At the sound of the bell, farmhands would leave their tasks and gather at the house for the main midday dinner – a routine that underscores the farm's sizeable operation and workforce. The Moore family home itself served not only as a residence but also as the farm's headquarters. With its many rooms and fireplaces, the house would have been a bustling center of family activity and farm management – from cooking and preserving food in the kitchen, to business dealings in the study (for example, arranging sales of horses or land transactions). Travelers on Brookville Road or neighbors from nearby farms might stop by as well, as farmhouses often informally acted as inns or social hubs in that era, though it is not recorded if the Moore home took in travelers. Pleasant Run, the creek by the house, provided water for livestock and perhaps powered simple farm machinery, and dense woods in the vicinity would gradually have been cleared for pasture and cultivation. In the 1830s–1850s, the surrounding area was sparsely populated; aside from a few other farms; one would mostly find woods, prairies, and the newly cut roads (the National Road to the north and Brookville Road) connecting Indianapolis to outlying regions. This relative isolation meant the Moore farm was a self-contained world – neighbors might be a mile or more away, and trips into Indianapolis (three miles west) by horseback or wagon would be an event reserved for market days or important business.

By the 1850s and 1860s, Indianapolis was steadily growing (the population topped 18,000 by 1860), but the Moore farm remained just outside the city's developed area, retaining its rural character. The Moore family's prominence is evident in local histories – Thomas Moore Jr. was affectionately nicknamed "Uncle Tommie" in the community, reflecting his status as a well-known old settler. The farm's success not only provided economic benefit (quality horses and cattle for the region) but also likely set an example of agricultural improvement in Marion County.

== Christian family (late 19th century) ==
By the late 19th century, the Moore farm passed into the hands of the Christian family through marriage. Margaret J. Moore, a granddaughter of the original Thomas Moore, married Wilmer F. Christian in the mid-1800s, linking two prominent families. Margaret had been born and raised on the Moore farm and was the daughter of Thomas Moore Jr. and his wife Catherine. Wilmer Frederick Christian, originally from Maryland, came to Indianapolis after the Civil War (around 1865) and was a skilled carpenter and builder. Through his marriage into the Moore family, Wilmer Christian inherited the Moore farm and took over its operation.

Wilmer F. Christian (often known as Wilmer Christian Sr.) managed to successfully straddle two careers: he continued running the farm on Brookville Road and also rose to renown as a contractor and builder in Indianapolis. Christian's construction firm built many notable Indianapolis structures during the post-Civil War building boom. Among his credited projects were the Ingalls Block and the When Building (a famous downtown Indianapolis commercial building), the city's Union Stockyards, the I., B. & W. Railroad shops, and even the elegant Benjamin Harrison home (built in the 1870s for the future U.S. president). These accomplishments made Christian one of the best-known businessmen in the city. Meanwhile, the Moore farm continued under his tenure, presumably providing a rural retreat and additional income even as the family's primary focus may have shifted to urban endeavors. It was likely during the Christian family's era that some updates to the house occurred – for example, the decorative front porch with its ornate awning roof (with scroll-sawn brackets and trim) appears to have been added in the late 19th century, reflecting a Queen Anne stylistic influence that was popular in the 1880s.

Margaret (Moore) Christian died in 1904, and Wilmer F. Christian Sr. lived to age 91, dying in 1929. But before the elder Christian died, he had already handed down the farm to his son, Dr. Wilmer F. Christian Jr., ensuring the property stayed in family hands into the 20th century. Wilmer Jr., was born in 1871, grew up on the Moore farm, and went on to become a prominent local physician and later an insurance executive and public official. He practiced medicine for 13 years and then held positions in insurance companies and was active in civic affairs, serving in appointed roles in city and state government. By the 1910s, the city of Indianapolis was expanding ever closer to the once-isolated Moore-Christian farm. Suburban development was encroaching from the west, and new neighborhoods like Irvington (to the north) had sprung up. The Moore-Christian property, still largely open land, caught the eye of city planners looking to add park space for the growing population.

== Park donation and urbanization (20th century) ==
In 1921, with Indianapolis rapidly expanding eastward to surround the old Moore farm, Wilmer F. Christian Jr. donated 40 acres (16 ha) of the family's farmland to the city of Indianapolis to create a public park. This gift was intended to honor his mother, Margaret Moore Christian, and the new park appropriately was named Christian Park. At the time of the donation, the area was still mostly rural and undeveloped – city records note that in 1921 there were very few homes in the vicinity of Christian Park, aside from a small cluster near Washington Street and Sherman Drive and some along Emerson Avenue. The majority of the land was still the Christian family's open fields. The establishment of Christian Park provided much-needed green space for the public and marked the beginning of the area's transition from farm to city neighborhood.

The remainder of the Moore farm was subdivided soon after the park's creation. In 1923, a large portion of the land north of the new park (down to the Pennsylvania Railroad tracks on the south) was platted as a residential subdivision called Christian Park Heights. The Moore-Christian farmhouse was located within this subdivision but was retained on its own parcel rather than being torn down. Legal descriptions show the house now sits on a lot composed of several of the Christian Park Heights subdivision lots, totaling just under one acre. Home construction in the subdivision began in the mid-1920s, and over the next few decades the area filled in with modest suburban houses. Thus, by the mid-20th century, the old farm had been completely absorbed into the urban fabric of Indianapolis – except for the Moore-Christian House itself.

Wilmer F. Christian Jr.'s death in 1923 in an automobile accident occurred just two years after the park donation. His passing, which made front-page news in Indianapolis at the time, effectively ended the direct involvement of the Moore-Christian descendants with the property. The historic farmhouse likely passed out of the family around this period (either sold by Christian's estate or later by surviving relatives). Over subsequent decades, the house saw various owners but remained a private residence. By the late 1970s, it was owned by James and Cynthia O'Donnell, who were responsible for seeking its recognition as a historic landmark and helped prepare the National Register nomination in 1979.

Despite the urban neighborhood growing up around it, the Moore-Christian House survived largely intact, though not without changes. No original outbuildings remain today – barns, stables, and other farm structures that once accompanied the house were removed as the land was sold off and developed. A small frame garage, built around the 1940s, is the only secondary structure on the property in recent times. The house itself underwent a significant alteration in the 1940s, when the two-story rear wing's L-shaped porch was removed and enclosed to create additional interior space. At that time, smaller rectangular windows were added on the back side of the house where the porch had been. This mid-20th-century modification reflects the home's adaptation from a farmhouse (where a rear porch was practical for summer chores and food prep) to a purely residential use in a city setting. Aside from this, the exterior retains its 19th-century appearance, especially the formal symmetrical front façade. In 1979, recognizing the house's historical and architectural importance, the owners worked with the Historic Landmarks Foundation of Indiana (now Indiana Landmarks) to place a façade easement on the property. This legal agreement protects the home's exterior from unsympathetic changes, helping to preserve its character. The following year, the house was officially nominated and later added to the National Register of Historic Places on March 15, 1984. These steps ensured the Moore-Christian House would be preserved as a tangible link to Indianapolis's early years.

The Thomas Moore House remains a private residence and a historically protected landmark.

== Timeline ==
- 1831 – Thomas Moore, an Irish immigrant, arrives in Indianapolis from Ohio while working on the National Road. He acquires a federal land grant for a large tract east of the city and begins establishing a livestock farm.
- 1837 – Thomas Moore's will references a "new dwelling house" under construction on his farm. This may refer to the initial building of what becomes the Moore House, though later evidence casts uncertainty on whether the present house is the same structure.
- 1838 – Thomas Moore dies, having become a prominent early citizen of Indianapolis. His son Thomas Moore Jr. inherits the farm and continues to develop it. Under Thomas Jr., the farm gains renown for its carriage horses and Shorthorn cattle breeding program.
- Mid-1800s – The Moore family builds a substantial two-story brick farmhouse (the current house) in an Italianate style common to the mid-19th century. The exact construction date is unclear, but family and local sources later suggest dates in the late 1830s or early 1840s. The house features Federal/Greek Revival details on the interior, indicating it straddles architectural styles.
- Late 1860s – Margaret J. Moore (granddaughter of Thomas Moore Sr.) marries Wilmer F. Christian of Maryland, bringing the Christian family into ownership of the farm. Wilmer F. Christian Sr. takes over farm operations and in the following decades also makes a name as a builder of significant Indianapolis structures.
- 1871 – Wilmer F. Christian Jr. (Dr. Christian) is born to Wilmer Sr. and Margaret, growing up at the Moore farm. (He will later become the final generation of the family to oversee the property). The family at this time resides partly in the city at 404 N. Alabama Street but retains the farm as well.
- 1904 – Margaret (Moore) Christian dies, the last of the Moore family line in Indianapolis (aside from descendants). Wilmer F. Christian Sr. continues to hold the farm.
- c.1900–1910 – Wilmer F. Christian Jr. assumes ownership of the remaining farm land. Indianapolis's growth is now reaching the area, with new neighborhoods forming nearby.
- 1921 – Wilmer F. Christian Jr. and his wife Edna donate 40 acres (16 ha) of the farm to the city of Indianapolis for a public park. The park is named Christian Park in honor of his mother Margaret. At this time, the Christian family still owns most of the surrounding land and the area remains largely undeveloped countryside.
- 1923 – The remaining Christian land (north of Christian Park) is platted as Christian Park Heights, a new residential subdivision. In the same year, Wilmer F. Christian Jr. dies in an automobile accident. With his death, the direct Moore-Christian family involvement in the property ends. The historic farmhouse is retained on a parcel of a little under one acre amid the new subdivision.
- 1925–1950 – Residential development fills in Christian Park Heights. Most of the Moore farm's former acreage is built over with modest homes, especially after World War II. The Moore-Christian House remains standing as the neighborhood grows around it.
- 1940s – The Moore-Christian House undergoes an alteration: the original two-story rear porch (forming part of the "L" shape of the house) is removed and enclosed as interior space. New windows are added on the rear wall. Around this time a small detached garage is built on the property for modern use. No original farm outbuildings remain after this period.
- 1979 – Recognizing the historical significance of the house, preservationists secure a façade easement on the Moore-Christian House, administered by the Historic Landmarks Foundation of Indiana (Indiana Landmarks). This protects the exterior from alteration. A nomination for the National Register of Historic Places is prepared.
- 1984 – The Thomas Moore House (Moore-Christian House) is officially listed on the National Register of Historic Places on March 15, 1984. The listing cites the house's Italianate architecture and its association with early Indianapolis settlers and development.

== Significance and legacy ==
The history of the Thomas Moore House mirrors the history Indianapolis's growth. It began as a frontier farm, housed generations through growing prosperity, and eventually yielded to urban expansion. The Moore family played a foundational role in the area – helping build the National Road and supplying livestock to a young city – while the Christian family bridged the 19th and 20th centuries, contributing to the city's built environment and granting land for a new neighborhood. The Moore-Christian House blends architectural styles, reflecting this layered history. Preserved and documented, the house now allows glimpses of daily life on an Indianapolis farm from nearly 180 years ago.

== See also ==
- National Register of Historic Places listings in Center Township, Marion County, Indiana
