= John Moore House (Edgecomb, Maine) =

Historic house in Maine, United States

- U.S. National Register of Historic Places
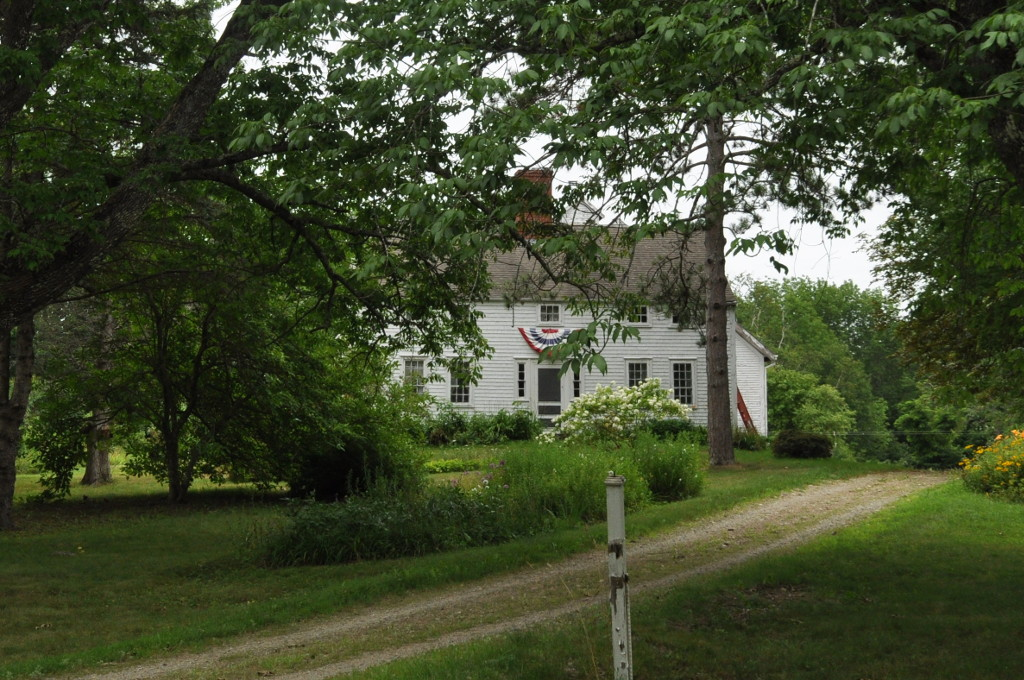

- Location within Maine Location within the United States
- Location: Cross Point Rd., Edgecomb, Maine
- Coordinates: 43°58′35″N 69°38′55″W
- Area: 1 acre (0.40 ha)
- Built: 1740
- Built by: Moore, John
- Architectural style: Colonial
- NRHP reference No.: 79000155
- Added to NRHP: July 10, 1979

The John Moore House is a historic house on Cross Point Road in Edgecomb, Maine. With elements dating to the early 1740s, it is one of the oldest surviving structures in Mid Coast Maine. The connected farmstead includes a barn that was built before 1850. The property was listed on the National Register of Historic Places in 1979.

== Description and history ==
The John Moore House stands in a rural part of northern Edgecomb, on the east side of Cross Point Road. The house is a connected farmstead, with a 1-3/4 story main block, and an elongated 1 1/2-story ell joining it to a barn. It is finished in wooden clapboards and its parts are covered by gabled roofs. The main block has a central chimney, and its facade is five bays wide, with a center entrance framed by sidelight windows and a cornice above. There are small second-story windows below the roof line. The parlors of the main block retain original period woodwork.

The land on which this house stands was granted to John Moore in 1736, and the house is known to have been standing in 1741. It was original a 1 1/2-story Cape, with its roof raised c. 1765 by John Grey, who purchased it from Moore in 1764. In 1850, the ell was built, and the barn was moved from another location to this place and connected to it. In the late 19th century, the house was owned by William Manson Patterson, a ship's captain.

== See also ==
- National Register of Historic Places listings in Lincoln County, Maine
