= House on Ellicott's Hill =

United States national historic place

- U.S. National Register of Historic Places
- U.S. National Historic Landmark
- Mississippi Landmark
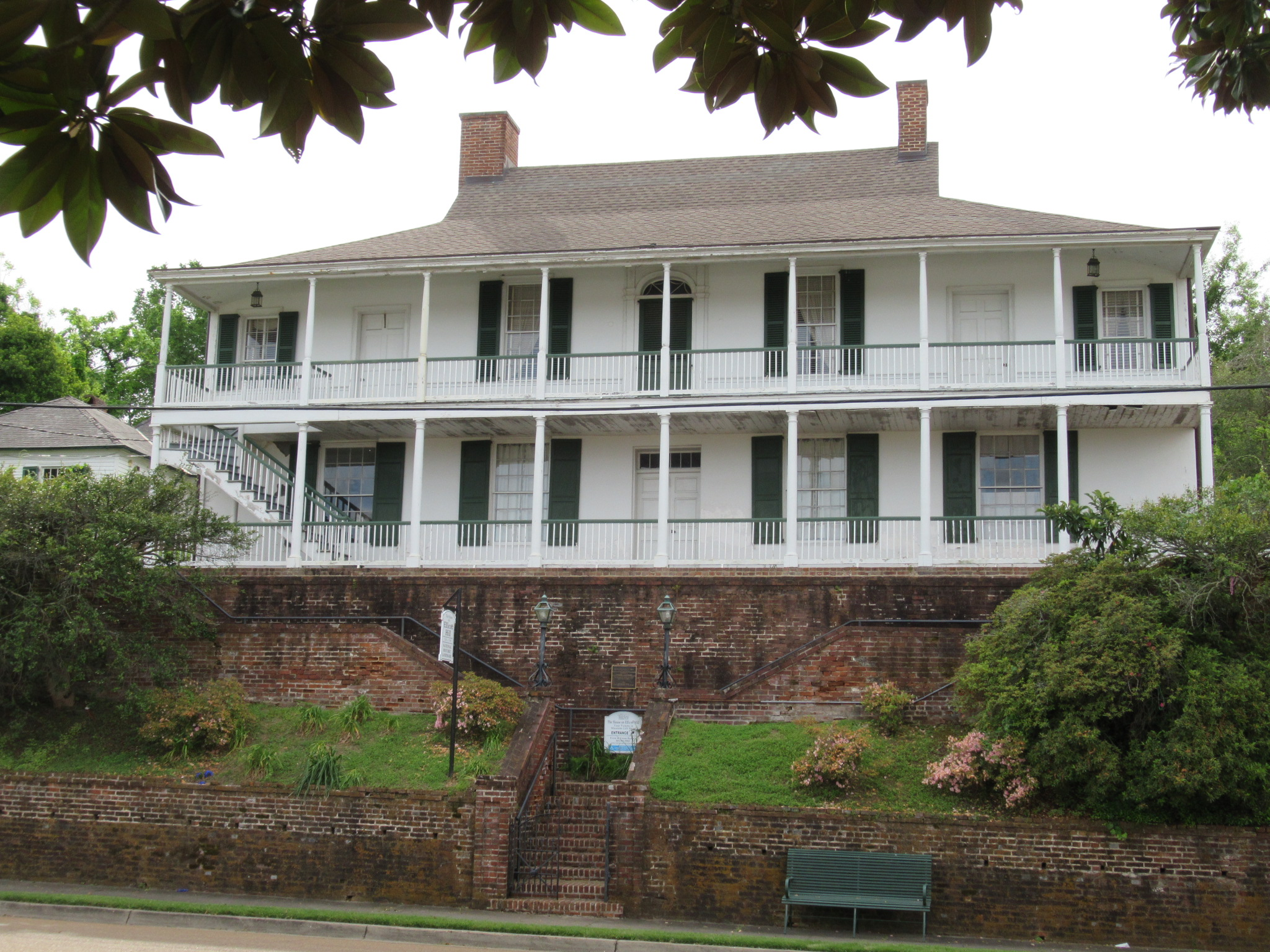
- House on Ellicott's Hill in 2019

- Location within Mississippi Location within the United States
- Location: 215 Canal Street N, Natchez, Mississippi
- Coordinates: 31°33′44.96″N 91°24′13.01″W
- Built: 1798
- Architect: James Moore
- NRHP reference No.: 74001050
- USMS No.: 001-NAT-0023-NHL-NRD-ML

Significant dates
- Added to NRHP: May 30, 1974
- Designated NHL: May 30, 1974
- Designated USMS: July 13, 2001

The House on Ellicott's Hill, also known as Connelly's Tavern, James Moore House, or Gilreath's Hill, is a historic house museum at 211 North Canal Street in Natchez, Mississippi. Built in 1798, it is the oldest surviving building in Natchez from its early territorial period. It was declared a National Historic Landmark in 1974 and a Mississippi Landmark in 2001.

== History ==
The House on Ellicott Hill is a National Historic Landmark and important as a grand and rare surviving example of an early vernacular building form once typical of the Lower Mississippi Valley. Built between 1798 and 1801, the house is also one of the first buildings in the Mississippi Territory to exhibit the definitive characteristics of the Federal style.

The house features a distinctive roof shape created by surrounding shed roofs attached high on a central gable. This Anglo-American roof shape differs from the French Louisiana vernacular, where shed roofs extend from a central hipped roof. The Anglo House on Ellicott Hill relates to its French vernacular contemporaries in Louisiana in the use of bousillage, composed of mud and Spanish moss, in the exterior walls of the frame upper story. Construction details also document the early expansion of the house to the north and south and the early enclosure of a rear loggia.

Built into the side of a hill, the façade of the house is two-stories including a raised brick basement. On the rear elevation, where the basement is beneath ground level, the house reads as a single story. A dry moat across the rear provides light and ventilation for the basement rooms. Eliza Baker in an 1805 letter home to New Jersey describes Natchez as having a number of houses that are similar in form, if not in scale, to the House on Ellicott Hill:

...the style which prevails... namely one-story, with this difference—that there is a lower story dug out of the side of the hill presenting two stories in front and but one in the rear...[with] a long gallery or piazza, partly enclosed by Venetian blinds...

Buildings that were similar in form to the House on Ellicott Hill probably inspired English travel writer Fortescue Cuming, in Sketches of a Tour to the Western County, 1807–1809, to write that he was "much struck with the similarity of Natchez to many of the smaller West Indian towns, particularly St. Johns Antigua…the houses all with balconies and pizzas." He was not the only writer to relate the early architectural character of Natchez to the West Indies. This similarity is understandable since Natchez and the West Indies shared the same mixture of national influences, similar climate, and common trade interests.

The House on Ellicott Hill stands on property acquired as a Spanish grant in 1797 by Natchez merchant James Moore. Construction probably began after January 1798, when the site hosted an encampment of soldiers led by Major Isaac Guion, commander of the United States forces ordered to take possession of the Spanish posts east of the Mississippi. In addition, the hill was the site of the encampment of Andrew Ellicott, sent by President George Washington to survey the boundary of the new Mississippi Territory with Spain. According to Dr. William Morton ("Andrew Ellicott, Stargazer"), it was Ellicott who first raised the American flag from this hill, to which Spanish Governor Gayoso responded by aiming his fort's cannon in its direction. A notice in Green's Impartial Observer [Natchez], February 21, 1801, indicates that James Moore, by that date, is living on the property. An 1805 city tax roll documents the house as having a tax valuation of $8,000, second in value only to Texada, which was built ca. 1798, documented as the city's first brick house, and valued at $12,000.

The architectural integrity of the House on Ellicott Hill is outstanding, with few changes made after the 1820s. The house retains most of its original millwork, including the fan-lighted doorways of the front and rear elevations, which are arguably the earliest Mississippi expression of this common hallmark of the federal style. The interior millwork of the principal room is finely executed and includes a gouged-carved cornice and a matching pair of gouge-carved mantel pieces, one of which is original and the other a matching reproduction dating to the restoration. The room includes a regionally unique ceiling dome that provided extra height for a lighting fixture and was probably lined with tin to reflect light.

== Restoration ==
The house was purchased in 1934 by the Natchez Garden Club and restored, since it was in a dilapidated condition. Architect Richard Koch worked to restore the house, rebuilding collapsing masonry, repairing carpentry and plasterwork, and restoring wood trim, among other things. At the time of the restoration, the house was believed to be a former tavern owned by Patrick Connelly, but later research by the Natchez Garden club revealed that the tavern was actually located one block southeast of the house on Ellicott's Hill.

Alterations to the house are primarily associated with the 1930s restoration, and include the redesign of the gallery staircase and the removal of the extension of the masonry basement wall that enclosed the northern end of the lower gallery to partially shelter the gallery staircase. Also, in typical Natchez fashion, the first flight of the dog-leg staircase originally abutted the front wall and extended across a window. The colonnettes on pedestals supporting the upper gallery and the slender turned columns of the lower gallery also date to the mid-1930s restoration. Pre-restoration photographs document crude replacements of both the gallery posts and balustrade.

The House on Ellicott Hill is open to the public as a house museum operated by the Natchez Garden Club, whose mid-1930s restoration marked the first time that an organization acquired and restored a historic building in Mississippi.

== In popular culture ==
Opening screens of the 1951 film Show Boat were filmed at the home.

== See also ==
- List of National Historic Landmarks in Mississippi
- National Register of Historic Places listings in Adams County, Mississippi
