= John and Helen Moore House =

Historic house in Oregon, United States

- U.S. National Register of Historic Places
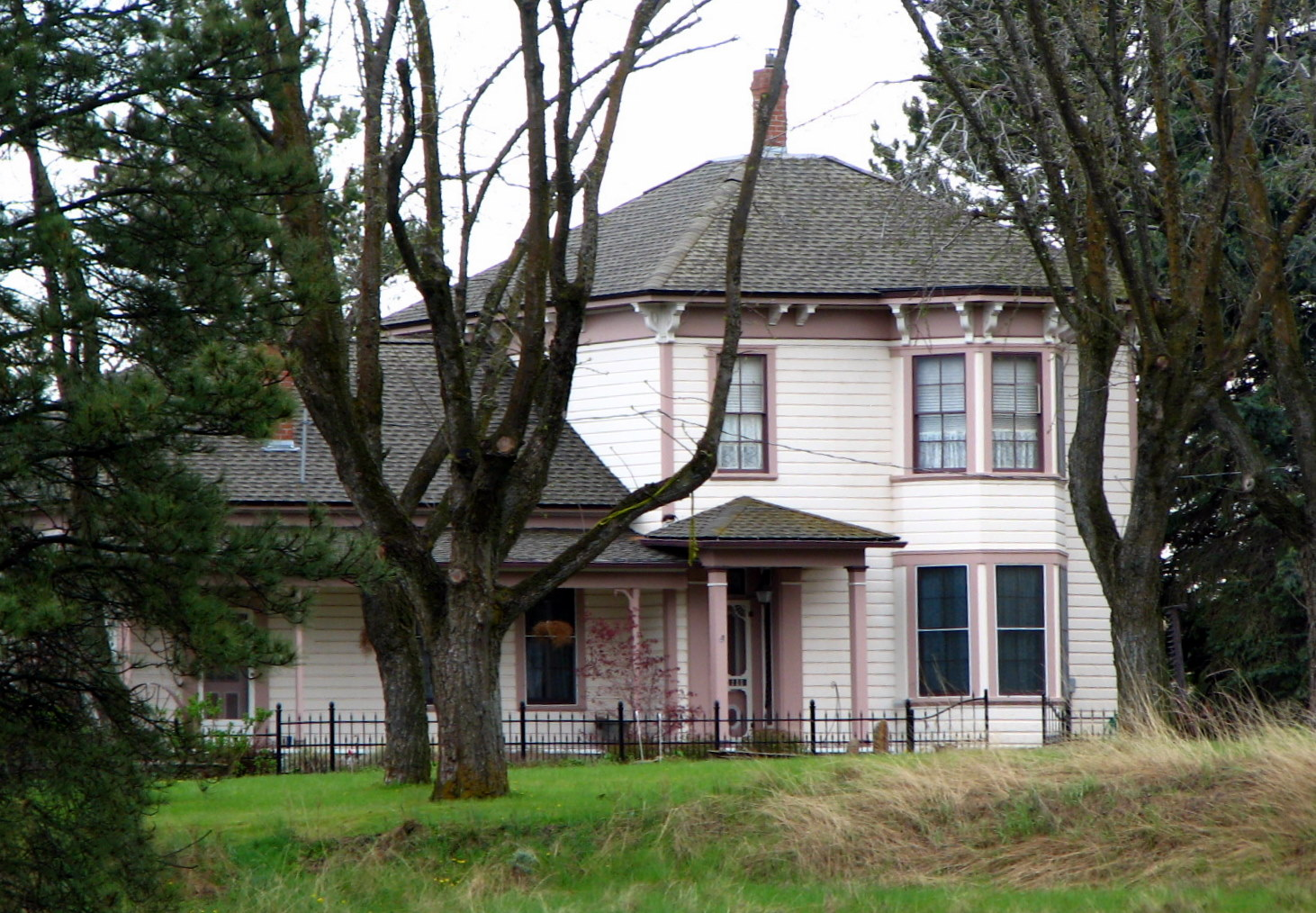
- The Moore House in 2009
- Location: 66432 Highway 97; Moro, Oregon
- Coordinates: 45°26′44″N 120°45′16″W
- Area: 2.24 acres (0.91 ha)
- Built: 1882
- Architectural style: Italianate
- NRHP reference No.: 94000806
- Added to NRHP: August 5, 1994

The John and Helen Moore House is a historic house near Moro, Oregon, United States. It is an excellent example of the rural expression of the Italianate style in residential construction. Built in 1882, around the time of the first large-scale settlement of what became Sherman County, it is also one of the oldest houses in the county, and the only Italianate house in the region.

The house was listed on the National Register of Historic Places in 1994.

== See also ==
- National Register of Historic Places listings in Sherman County, Oregon
