= John Moore House (Lexington, Virginia) =

Historic house in Virginia, United States

- U.S. National Register of Historic Places
- Virginia Landmarks Register
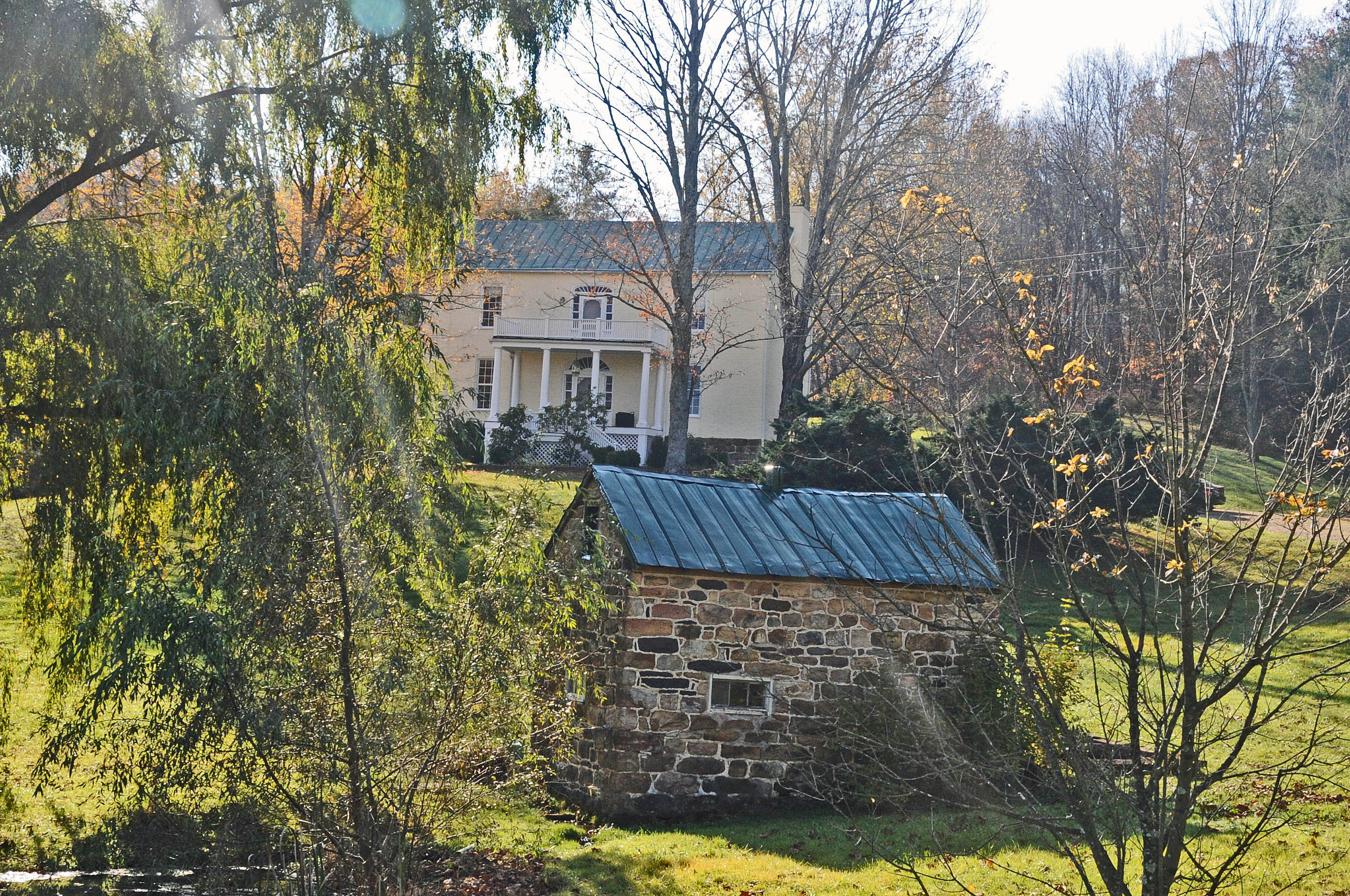

- Location within Virginia Location within the United States
- Location: 183 Big Hill Rd., near Lexington, Virginia
- Coordinates: 37°51′39″N 79°33′06″W
- Area: 10.2 acres (4.1 ha)
- Built: 1831
- Architectural style: Federal
- NRHP reference No.: 99000728
- VLR No.: 081-0028

Significant dates
- Added to NRHP: June 25, 1999
- Designated VLR: August 17, 1999

John Moore House is a historic home located near Lexington, Rockbridge County, Virginia. It was built in 1831, and is a two-story, three-bay Federal style brick dwelling. It sits on a stone foundation and has a standing seam metal gable roof. The property also includes a contributing spring house (c. 1830).

It was listed on the National Register of Historic Places in 1999.
