= Stan Moore (director) =

American film director

Stanley Clark Moore (born February 9, 1956, in Memphis, Tennessee) is an American film director, screenwriter, and film producer.

== Early life ==
Moore was born in Memphis, Tennessee, to a military (Air Force) family. He spent his childhood on several U.S. Air Force bases around Texas and Nevada before his father settled in Houston, Texas, as a pilot for Delta Air Lines. In his early teens, he made amateur 8 mm films with his friends as high school projects. One film, based on the story of Agamemnon, was aired on the local NBC affiliate in Houston.

He attended Humble High School in Texas earning letters in football and baseball, plus being named to the National Honor Society and graduating in the top ten of his class. In the autumn of 1974, Moore headed to Baylor University to study Biology and Chemistry and work on a Pre-Med degree. While attending Baylor in the 1970s, Moore became a member of Phi Delta Theta fraternity. During this time, he also dabbled in acting and filmmaking by attending classes outside of his science degree. Upon completion of his bachelor's degree, Moore applied to NASA for a research grant under their new doctoral program. While waiting on confirmation, he relocated to Dallas and purchased a professional still camera and self-taught himself to take fashion-related photographs. He also was able to find work as a model and actor in the growing film and fashion industries in Dallas. When NASA’s funding was slashed in 1979, Moore found that his hopes to work for the agency had ended.

For several years, Moore spent time acting, shooting stills, working as a grip and freelance writing for newspapers and small companies. He also dabbled in stand-up comedy and comedy writing/direction. In Nashville, he wrote and directed shows at the Poverty Playhouse and 3rd Coast Comedy. He also performed his stand up routine in New York at the Comic Strip and Dangerfield’s, in Dallas at the Comedy Corner, at North Texas State University and won the Funniest Man in Denton contest in 1982.

== Graduate school ==
In 1983, he applied to attend the graduate film school at North Texas State University. While completing classes toward his degree, Moore also taught the undergraduate TV/Film writing classes and started a practicum for students at the local cable station. The student produced show, NT Scene, gave students real world experience in producing a magazine type program. The show continues today and formed the anchor for the later established university cable station. Also, while in graduate school, Moore auditioned for and was granted a membership in the Texas Stuntman’s Association. His former professional motocross skills made him a specialist in motorcycle stunts and he performed several stunts in the film “Final Cut” shot near Caddo Lake in Texas. He also served as 2nd Assistant Director and secured numerous film students from NTSU to work on the film as grips, PAs and extras. In 1985 he was awarded a master's degree in Film Production/Critique and Electronic Arts.

== Career ==
In Dallas, Moore continued to work as an actor and stuntman in films and commercials. In 1986, on the film “No Safe Haven” starring Wings Hauser, Moore became a SAG-AFTRA member and worked as an Associate Producer. The world of production of low-budget action films allowed him to learn filmmaking from most every angle. When a call came to work on a very low-budget film titled R.O.T.O.R in 1987, Moore found himself helping to cast and scout locations during pre-production and then fill in for the fired production manager. Work on the film included stunts, acting, weapons and special effects coordination along with managing the production. Unfortunately, Moore’s hard work and dedication couldn't save a poor script and poor direction.

In 1989, Stan moved to Nashville, Tennessee and jumped into the world of music video production. As a subcontractor for Jim Owens Entertainment, he shot and directed over 200 music videos helping build a library of oldies and karaoke videos. He soon moved into directing country videos for Moe Bandy, Clinton Gregory, Glen Campbell, and Mel McDaniel among others. His music video for Clinton Gregory, “Play, Ruby, Play”, was awarded Best Independent Video at the Music Row Video Awards.

In 1991 Moore established his own production company Moore Productions which later became an S-Corp named M.P. Films, Inc.

Over the years, his production company has produced over 70 television commercials, 50 music videos, and 300+ industrial films. The company has completed projects for clients such as IBM, EMI, Focus on the Family, The Magic Johnson Foundation, Sony BMG, Summit Toys, Thomas Nelson Publishers, Tyndale House Publishers, Cedarmont Music and Warner Brothers among others.

Moore won Emmy Awards for Cinematography in 1995 and for Best Director in 1996 in the Midsouth region. Over the years, his films have played at festivals around the world including the American Film Institute, the Hollywood Film Festival, the Houston Film Festival and the Chicago International Film Festival. Stan’s documentary work has been recognized by the Liberty Film Festival in Los Angeles, the International Christian Film Festival and the Telly Awards. As a screenwriter, his historic script on The Flying Tigers is a Charleston Film Festival and Phoenix Film Festival award winner.

== Awards ==
- 2 Emmy Awards
- 5 Emmy Award Nominations
- 14 Telly Awards
- 1 Addy Award
- Citation of Excellence
- Hollywood Film Festival
- Liberty Film Festival
- 1 Platinum Award, 3 Gold Awards, 3 Silver Awards from Worldfest Houston and Worldfest Charleston
- 1 Dove Award Nomination
- Crown Award: Best Music Video
- International Christian Visual Media
- New Works Award: American Film Institute Video Festival
- Los Angeles, CA
- Certificate of Merit: Chicago International Film Festival
- Best Independent Video: Music Row Video Awards
- Judge's Award: Nashville Film Festival

== Filmography ==
=== Music videos ===
- "Ain't No Safe Way" – Michael Sweet
- Action Bible Songs (Cedarmont, 1995)
- Silly Songs (Cedarmont, 1995)
- Sunday School Songs (Cedarmont, 1996)
- Toddler Tunes (Cedarmont, 1996)
- Bible Songs (Cedarmont, 1997)
- Preschool Songs (Cedarmont, 1997)
- School Days/Songs of America (Cedarmont, 1998/2002)
- Toddler Action Songs (Cedarmont, 2002)

=== Feature films ===
- No Safe Haven, Associate Producer, Vanguard Productions, Release: International, Video
- R.O.T.O.R., Co-Producer, P.M., Westwind Pictures, Release: International, Video
- Final Cut, 2nd-Assistant Director, Forward Pictures, Release: International, Video
- Sting, The Moment of Truth, Senior Editor, Dove Canyon Films, Release: International, Video

== See also ==
- Clinton Gregory
