= Ray Pennington =

American country music singer-songwriter (1933–2020)

- Birth name: Ramon Daniel Pennington
- Also known as: Ray Starr
- Born: December 22, 1933; Clay County, Kentucky, U.S.
- Origin: Nashville, Tennessee, U.S.
- Died: October 7, 2020 (aged 86); Hendersonville, Tennessee, U.S.
- Occupation(s): Singer-songwriter, record producer
- Instrument(s): Vocals, drums, piano, guitar
- Years active: 1958–1998
- Labels: King; Capitol; Monument; MRC; Step One; RCA Records; Mary Reeves Music

Ramon Daniel Pennington (December 22, 1933 – October 7, 2020) was an American country music singer, songwriter, and record producer. He is known for writing the song "I'm a Ramblin' Man", and for founding the independent Step One Records label.

== Career ==
Pennington first performed in a western swing band called the Western Rhythm Boys, which performed in Ohio. In 1958, he signed with King Records and released "Three Hearts in a Tangle" under the name Ray Starr. However, Pennington was dissatisfied with the recording, so he asked that it be withdrawn as a single. Pennington then took up record producer and artists and repertoire jobs at the label, including a production credit on Hawkshaw Hawkins' final album, Lonesome 7-7203, one of the first country albums to feature both black and white session musicians. He also produced for The Stanley Brothers and Reno and Smiley, also playing drums for the latter.

Roy Drusky covered "Three Hearts in a Tangle", taking his rendition to number 2 on the country charts in 1961. Pennington continued to perform in both the Western Rhythm Boys and another band called the Starliners. He also worked at a record store and released a rhythm and blues single called "I Have to Laugh to Keep from Crying", also under the name Ray Starr.

Pennington moved to Nashville, Tennessee, in 1964, where he worked at Pamper Music, producing for Tex Williams and Kenny Price, who recorded two of Pennington's songs: "Walking on New Grass" and "Happy Tracks". Pennington signed to Capitol Records in 1966 as a recording artist, charting three songs (including the number 29 "I'm a Ramblin' Man") before leaving. He moved to Monument Records in 1969, where he charted five more times, but soon left that label to work at RCA Records. While at RCA, Waylon Jennings covered "I'm a Ramblin' Man" and took it to number 1, as Pennington continued to work as a producer for RCA artists such as Billy Walker and Norma Jean. Pennington charted his last solo single, "She Wanted a Little Bit More", on MRC Records in 1978. He later founded the duo Bluestone with Jerry McBee, and charted "Haven't I Loved You Somewhere Before".

In 1984, Pennington co-founded Step One Records with Mel Holt. Ray Price was the first act signed to the label, and fiddler Clinton Gregory charted three Top 30 hits while on Step One. Western Flyer, Celinda Pink and The Geezinslaws were also among the label's roster.

While on Step One, Pennington recorded multiple albums with the Swing Shift Band, co-founded with steel guitarist Buddy Emmons. This band charted with "Turn Me Loose and Let Me Swing" in 1988. Step One closed in 1998.

== Death ==
Pennington died on October 7, 2020, at his home in Hendersonville, Tennessee. He was 86, and died after entering a garage that had caught fire. His wife, Mama Charlotte, was able to escape unharmed.

== Discography ==
=== Albums ===
Source: AllMusic

Title	Album details
Ray Pennington Sings for the Other Woman	Release date: 1970; Label: Monument Records
Memories	Release date: 1984; Label: Step One Records
Dear Lord, I've Changed (Since I've Been Unchained)	Release date: 1988; Label: Step One Records

=== In the Swing Shift Band ===
Source: AllMusic

Title	Album details
Swingin' from the 40s Through the 80s	Release date: 1984; Label: Step One Records
In the Mood for Swingin'	Release date: 1986; Label: Step One Records
Swing & Other Things	Release date: 1988; Label: Step One Records
Swingin' Our Way	Release date: 1990; Label: Step One Records
Swingin' by Request	Release date: 1992; Label: Step One Records
It's All in the Swing	Release date: 1995; Label: Step One Records
Goin' Out Swingin'	Release date: 1997; Label: Step One Records

=== Singles ===
Source: AllMusic

Year	Single	Peak chart positions
Year	Single	US Country
1966	"Who's Been Mowing the Lawn (While I Was Gone)"	43
1967	"I'm a Ramblin' Man"	29
1967	"Who's Gonna Walk the Dog (And Put Out the Cat)"	65
1969	"What Eva Doesn't Have"	70
1969	"This Song Don't Care Who Sings It"	69
1970	"You Don't Know Me"	61
1970	"The Other Woman"	74
1971	"Bubbles in My Beer"	68
1978	"She Wanted a Little Bit More"	79
1980	"Haven't I Loved You Somewhere Before" (in Bluestone)	79
1988	"(Turn Me Loose and) Let Me Swing" (in Swing Shift Band)	76
