= Play, Ruby, Play =

Single by Clinton Gregory

from the album Freeborn Man
- B-side: "She Can't Believe My Eyes"
- Released: January 1992
- Genre: Country
- Length: 3:46
- Label: Step One
- Songwriters: Tony Brown; Troy Seals
- Producer: Ray Pennington

Clinton Gregory singles chronology
"Satisfy Me and I'll Satisfy You" (1991)	"Play, Ruby, Play" (1992)	"She Takes the Sad Out of Saturday Night" (1992)

"Play, Ruby, Play" is a song written by Tony Brown and Troy Seals. It was originally recorded by Conway Twitty for his 1990 album House on Old Lonesome Road.

It was later recorded by American country music artist Clinton Gregory. It was released in January 1992 as the first single from his album Freeborn Man. The song peaked at No. 25 on the Billboard Hot Country Singles & Tracks chart and reached number 20 on the RPM Country Tracks chart in Canada.

The song is about an attractive piano player named Ruby, and the narrator's obsession with her. Lisa Smith and Cyndi Hoelzle of Gavin Report wrote that "Gregory demonstrates that he can handle a driving country rock song as well as ballads and honky tonkers".

== Chart performance ==
Chart (1992)	Peak position
Canada Country Singles (RPM)	20
US Hot Country Songs (Billboard)	25
