= Chris Marion =

American musician (born 1962)

- Marion in 2006

Background information
- Born: January 8, 1962 (age 64)
- Origin: Belton, Texas, U.S.
- Genres: Rock, gospel
- Instruments: Vocals, keyboards
- Years active: 1976–present
- Member of: Little River Band
- Formerly of: Western Flyer
- Website: chrismarionmusic.com

Chris Marion (born January 8, 1962) is an American musician best known as a member of the Little River Band and for his contribution to the rock and gospel music industries. Born in Belton, Texas, and growing up in rural Virginia, Marion started his musical career as a pianist for his traveling family gospel group. He started taking piano lessons at age four and continued classical training on piano, trombone, and voice through college.

== Early life ==
After graduating with honors from Chilhowie High School in 1980, Marion pursued a degree in music at Carson-Newman College in Jefferson City, Tennessee. He eventually graduated with a degree in psychology. It was during his time at Carson Newman that he developed the relationships that led him to Nashville, Tennessee, to pursue music professionally.

== Career ==
Since moving to Nashville in 1987, Marion has toured with the likes of Steven Curtis Chapman, Shenandoah, Beth Moore and Jeannie Seely of the Grand Ole Opry. In 1994, along with Danny Myrick, Marion founded the country rock band Western Flyer on the Step One Record label which garnered four charting Billboard singles in the country genre along with critical praise.

As the writer and producer of a variety of children's musical projects, Marion has received 4 Gospel Music Association Dove Award nominations. He has been involved in projects involving LifeWay Christian Resources VBS and other religious products for Word Records, Benson Records and others. As a producer, Marion was part of a team that worked with Garth Brooks, Doug Stone, the Oak Ridge Boys and Charlie Chase.

At the end of 2004, Marion was invited to join Little River Band in which he is the keyboardist and a vocalist.

In 2011, Marion founded TourPRO, a touring personnel resource that facilitates personnel placement with artists and tours.

In 2013, Marion joined the editorial team at Harmony Central, a weekly e-magazine that features articles about the music industry, gear reviews, artist interviews and discussion forums.

In 2020, Marion married Stephanie Calvert of the band Starship. During their COVID-19 band hiatuses, they formed a duo, the B-Listers, with limited North American touring coordinating with the touring schedules of their respective bands.

In 2023, Marion was honored with a Triumph Award from his alma mater, Carson Newman University for distinguished achievement in Arts, Humanities and Social Sciences.

== Discography ==
| year | title | artist | contribution |
| 1989 | Compassionate Heart | Tony Elenburg (Milk and Honey) | keys/bass/vocals/production |
| 1990 | Dr. Newheart's Christmas Cure | Kathie Hill (Starsong) | keys / arrangement |
| 1993 | The Don't Be Afraid Brigade | Kathie Hill (Genevox) | keys / arrangement |
| 1993 | My Wife, My Life | Charlie Chase (RCA) | keys / vocals /production |
| 1994 | Hans Bronson's Gold Medal Mission | Kathie Hill (Genevox) | keys / arrangement |
| 1994 | Western Flyer | Western Flyer (SOR) | keyboards/vocals |
| 1996 | Back in America | Western Flyer (SOR) | keyboards/vocals/producer |
| 1996 | Nic at Night | Kathie Hill (Genevox) | keys / arrangement / songwriter |
| 1997 | The Christmas Family Tree | Kathie Hill (Genevox) | keys / arrangement / songwriter |
| 1997 | Levite Genes | Kathie Hill (Genevox) | keys / arrangement |
| 1998 | Dr. Newheart's Neck up Check Up | Kathie Hill (Word) | keys/arrangement (Dove Award nomination) |
| 1998 | Legacy | Chris Marion (NCS) | artist / producer |
| 1999 | The Oasis Project | Marion/Myrick/Wood (Genevox) | keys/producer/creator |
| 2000 | Fish Tales | Kathie Hill (Word) | keys / arrangement |
| 2000 | Black and White | Chris Marion (NCS) | artist / producer |
| 2001 | Sketches | Chris Marion (NCS) | artist / producer |
| 2001 | Esther-Ordinary Faith | Kathie Hill (Word) | keys / arrangement |
| 2001 | Operation Christmas Child | Kathie Hill (Word) | keys/arrangement (Dove Award nomination) |
| 2002 | Woven in Time | Steve Green (Word) | vocals/choir (Dove Award nomination) |
| 2002 | Good News from a Grave | Kathie Hill (Word) | keys / arrangement |
| 2003 | Pieces | Chris Marion (NCS) | artist / producer |
| 2003 | Holy Moses | Kathie Hill (Word) | keys / arrangement (Dove Award nomination) |
| 2004 | Unashamed Love | Travis Cottrell (Integrity) | keys |
| 2003 | Christmas SOCCER Team | Kathie Hill (Word) | keys / arrangement (Dove Award nomination) |
| 2005 | 321 Broadway | Fanny Grace (Sony/BMG) | keyboards |
| 2006 | Rearranged | Little River Band (Compass) | keys/vocals |
| 2007 | Greatest Hits Live | Little River Band (Sony/BMG) | keys/vocals |
| 2007 | We Call It Christmas | Little River Band (Little River Band Productions) | keys/vocals |
| 2010 | Outback EP | Little River Band (Little River Band Productions) | keys/vocals |
| 2013 | Cuts Like a Diamond | Little River Band (Frontiers Records) | keys/vocals |
| 2013 | Classic Hits | Little River Band (Cracker Barrel) | keys/vocals |
| 2016 | Revisited | Little River Band (Wurld Records) | keys/vocals |
| 2020 | Black Tie | Little River Band (Wurld Records) | keys/vocals |
