= Islamic Center of Murfreesboro =

Community organization in Tennessee, US

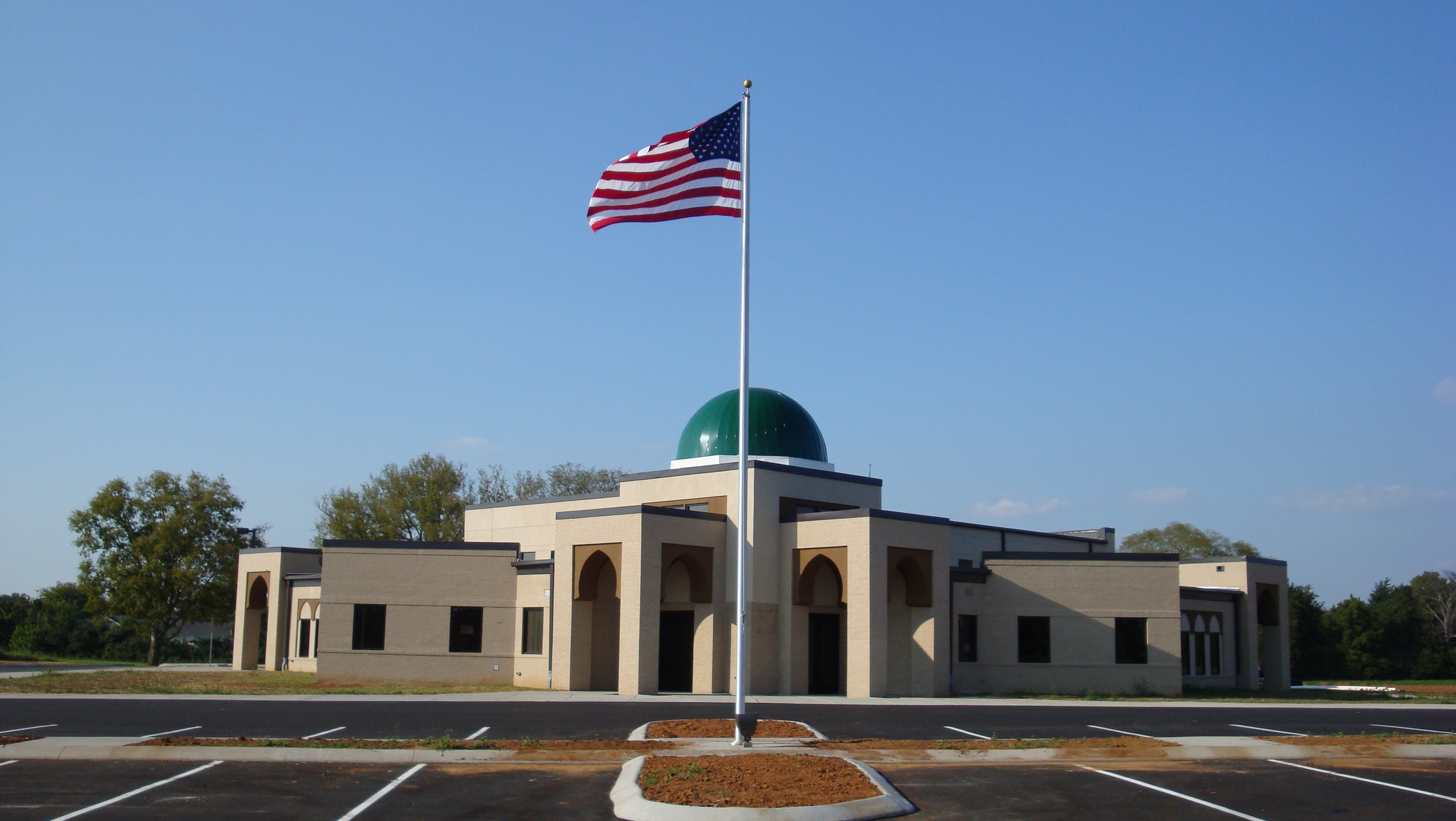

Religion
- Affiliation: Islam
- Branch/tradition: Sunni
- Ownership: Islamic Center of Murfreesboro

Location
- Location: Murfreesboro, Tennessee, United States
- Interactive map of Islamic Center of Murfreesboro
- Coordinates: 35.813098°N 86.349989°W

Architecture
- Type: Mosque
- Established: 1982

Website
- www.icmtn.org

The Islamic Center of Murfreesboro (ICM) is an Islamic community organization located in the town of Murfreesboro, Tennessee, United States. Established in the early 1980s, the ICM supports about a thousand congregants, drawn from local permanent residents and numerous students at Middle Tennessee State University.

Since the late 20th century, an increasing number of Muslim immigrants from Somalia and Iraq have settled in the city, and international students have increased. By 2009, the ICM's growth made the existing mosque and community center in central Murfreesboro inadequate for the number of worshippers using those facilities. The ICM bought a vacant lot on the outskirts of the city and submitted plans to build a new community center and mosque on the site. Although the plans were approved unanimously by the local county planning commission, some local residents and anti-Muslim groups opposed the project. Rival demonstrations were held in the town to express support for and opposition to the mosque project.

During the following two years, the mosque site was subjected to vandalism and arson. The ICM became the subject of heightened political rhetoric in an election year. Numerous opponents alleged that the ICM would support terrorism. At the same time, numerous local people and rights groups spoke out in support of the project, and the issues received national media coverage with emphasis on the US constitutional right to religious freedom. A local judge rejected that claim and found that the planning commission did not act improperly in granting approval, but that public notice of the planning commission's hearing on the action may have been inadequate. The court prohibited the issuance of a certificate of occupancy necessary to use the building. In August 2012, a US federal court lifted the county court's prohibition, saying it was inappropriate to subject the ICM to requirements in excess of other religious organizations. The mosque was allowed to open in time for the end of Ramadan in 2012. Further appeals and new lawsuits by the mosque's opponents prolonged the litigation until June 2014, when the last lawsuits were finally dismissed by the federal courts.

== Background ==
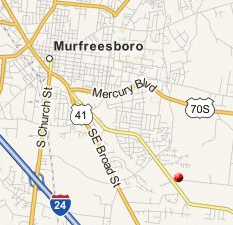
Map of Murfreesboro showing the location of the new Islamic Center of Murfreesboro mosque (marked with a red dot)

Murfreesboro is a town of about 150,000 people located in Middle Tennessee about 35 miles (56 km) southeast of the state capital, Nashville. Although the area's population is dominated by white conservative Christians, in recent years the foreign-born population of the Nashville metropolitan area (including Murfreesboro) has grown considerably. Between 2000 and 2008, the immigrant population jumped from 58,539 to 107,184 – an 83.1 percent rise, the fourth-largest percentage increase in the United States over that period. At the same time, the white population of the area fell by 7.5% while the percentage of ethnic minority inhabitants rose to 20% of Rutherford County's population.

The local Muslim population has likewise increased and now numbers about 25,000 people. The rise since the late 20th century has resulted in part from the arrival of refugees from Somalia and Kurds from Iraq, who were resettled there by the federal government upon fleeing the repression of Saddam Hussein after the first Gulf War. Middle Tennessee now has the largest population of Kurds in the United States. In addition, a significant number of foreign-born Muslims have moved to the area to study at Vanderbilt University or Middle Tennessee State University.

Established in 1982, the Islamic Center of Murfreesboro (ICM) formerly occupied a building of 21,000 square feet (2,000 m^{2}) located on Middle Tennessee Boulevard near Middle Tennessee State University. Its congregation consisted of about 250–300 local families and 400–500 Muslim students from the university – in total, about 1,000 people. By 2009, the congregation had outgrown the space available. Prayers were held in a poorly ventilated 1,200-square-foot (110 m^{2}) room while women, who worship separately from men, had to use a converted garage nearby to watch the proceedings on closed-circuit TV. Many worshippers frequently had to stand in the parking lot during prayers.

The ICM began looking for a new location in March 2009. Members raised about $600,000 to fund the construction of a new complex that would include a 12,000-square-foot (1,100 m^{2}) mosque, school, swimming pool, and cemetery. In November 2009, the ICM purchased an area of undeveloped land at the intersection of Bradyville Pike and Veals Road on the outskirts of Murfreesboro, about 4 miles (6.4 km) from its existing facilities in the town center, at a cost of $320,000 cash. A sign advertising the "Future Site of Islamic Center of Murfreesboro" was put up on the vacant lot, but in January 2010 it was vandalized during the Martin Luther King, Jr. Day weekend. The local newspaper, The Daily News Journal, condemned the vandalism as "a sign of stupidity" and commented that "for someone to paint such an idiotic message on the center's billboard is a clear sign that we have some backwards nuts in our midst." The sign was replaced but was subsequently ripped up and destroyed.

== Planning controversy ==
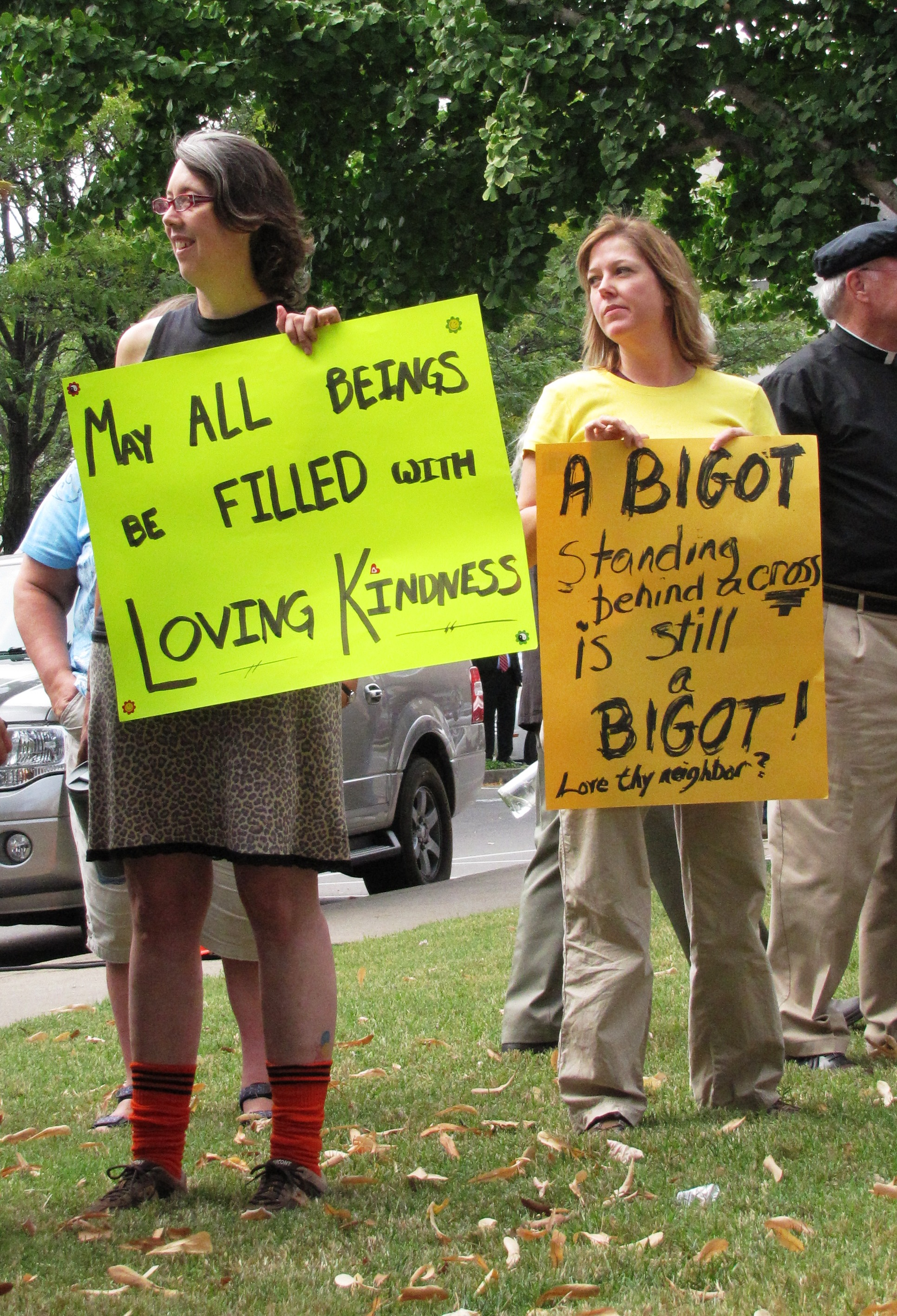
Pro-mosque supporters at a September 2010 rally in Murfreesboro

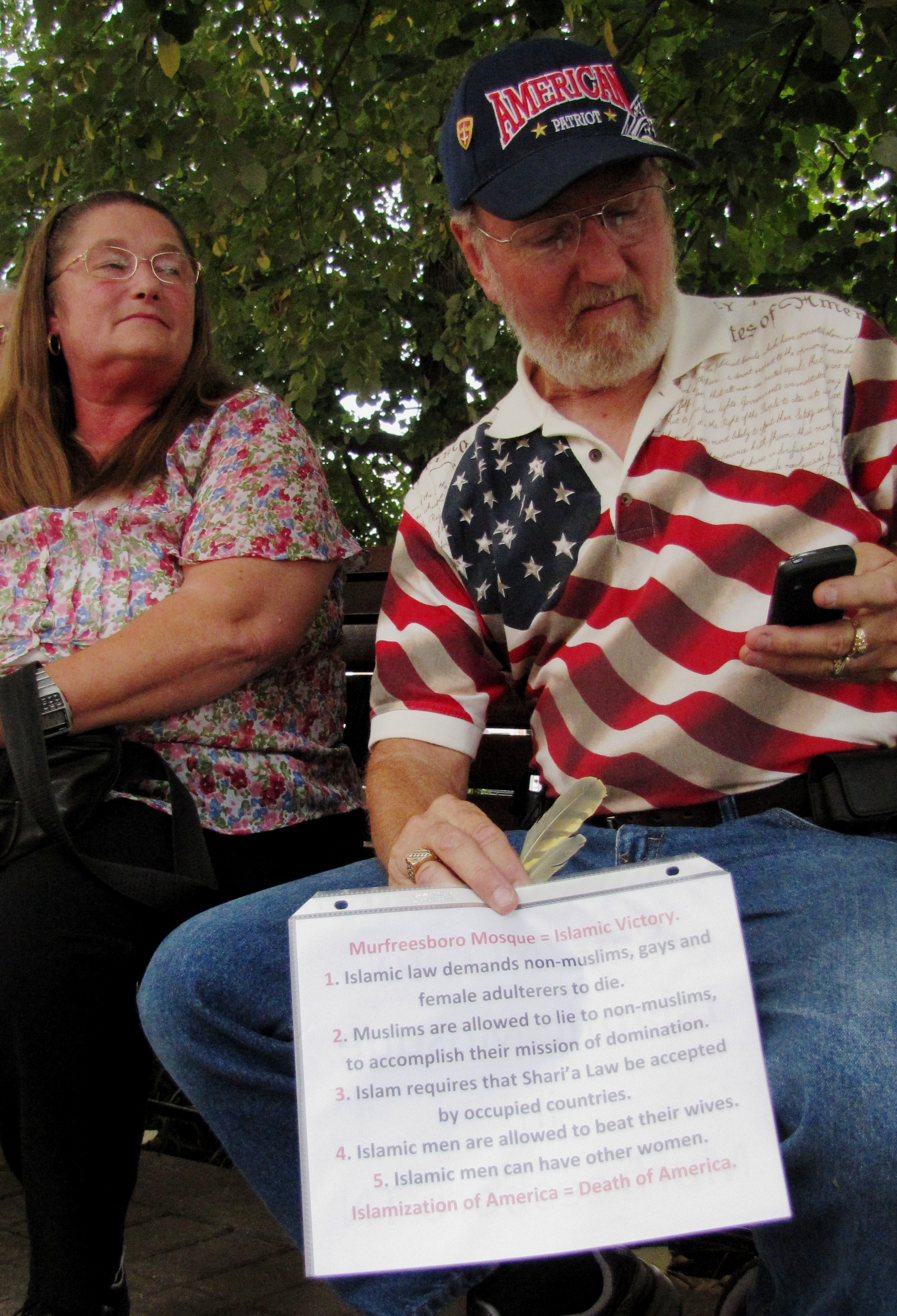
Anti-mosque demonstrators proclaiming "Murfreesboro Mosque = Islamic Victory"

In April 2010, the ICM sent the Regional Planning Commission of Rutherford County a request for the approval of the construction of a 52,000-square-foot (4,800 m^{2}) complex on the Veals Road lot. Prior to its next meeting, the commission ran an advertisement in The Murfreesboro Post newspaper. The main local newspaper, The Daily News Journal, also published a small news story on the day of the meeting. The commission unanimously approved the ICM's plans at its monthly meeting on May 24, 2010. County law did not require public hearings on religious construction projects and took a "use-by-right" approach, under which all that was needed for approval was a satisfactory set of plans, the approval of the commission at one public meeting, and the advertisement of that meeting in advance in a local newspaper. Other local religious buildings, such as the 80,000-square-foot (7,400 m^{2}) World Outreach Church, had been approved on a similar basis. Additionally, federal and state law made it all but impossible for local government bodies to deny building permits for religious institutions.

Although the application process attracted little comment at the time, a controversy broke out after the ICM's plans were approved. At the commission's next meeting, on June 17, 2010, more than 600 people, some wearing Christian- or patriotic-themed clothes, turned out to protest its approval of the ICM's plans. Many said they had become aware of the plans only after they had been approved. Opponents were harshly critical both of the ICM and of Islam itself. Karen Harrell, a Murfreesboro resident, said: "Everybody knows they are trying to kill us. People are really concerned about this. Somebody has to stand up and take this country back."

Other residents complained that the new mosque would have a harmful effect on traffic and housing values, noting that it was located in a primarily residential area. Commission officials rejected the criticism, stating that the plans met zoning requirements and that the law did not allow them to reject a project on religious grounds. The tenor of the opposition attracted criticism, with some residents calling the dispute "one of the ugliest displays of religious intolerance in the county's history." Rabbi Rami Shapiro of Middle Tennessee State University blamed misinformation and misplaced fears, commenting that "there are some who are just anti-Muslim and will do anything to keep a mosque out of their neighborhood. They really feel that Islam is a threat to America and American values."

Essam Fathy, an ICM member, said: "We have nothing to hide. We do not have a hidden agenda. We're not affiliated with anyone. Where is the tolerance?" The mosque's imam, Ossama Bahloul, said that he had told a child that the hatred faced by the center was "just a misunderstanding, miscommunication. I told him to love the people because one day they can love you, too."

The controversy gained national attention when Lou Ann Zelenik, a Tennessee Republican Party candidate for the vacant representative's seat in Tennessee's 6th congressional district, issued a statement in opposition. On June 24, 2010, Zelenik denounced the planned mosque as "an Islamic training center," saying that it was not a bona fide religious institution but a political one "designed to fracture the moral and political foundation of Middle Tennessee". She declared: "Until the American Muslim community find it in their hearts to separate themselves from their evil, radical counterparts, to condemn those who want to destroy our civilization and will fight against them, we are not obligated to open our society to any of them." Ben Lemming, a Democratic candidate for the same seat, was one of the few Tennessee politicians to support the mosque project, stating: "The Americans that want to build this mosque are already our neighbors. They live next to us and they are a part of our community. They are not the enemy."

Another Republican, Ron Ramsey, the Lieutenant Governor of Tennessee, questioned whether Islam is "actually a religion, or is it a nationality, way of life, cult or whatever you want to call it" and described it as resembling "a violent political philosophy more than [a] peace-loving religion." His comments, made in the run-up to a Republican primary election, were strongly criticised by a spokesman for the Council on American-Islamic Relations. He said that Ramsey's comments were part of "a disturbing trend in our nation in which it is suggested that American Muslims should have fewer or more restricted constitutional rights than citizens of other faiths." Murfreesboro's local state Senator, Bill Ketron, subsequently introduced what The American Prospect described as "one of the most extreme anti-Sharia-law bills in the country", authorizing the state attorney general to designate "Sharia organizations" and imposing a 15-year jail term on anyone convicted of supporting such an organization. The law was passed, but the state legislature took out direct references to Sharia and Islam. Hedy Weinburg of the American Civil Liberties Union's Tennessee branch views the controversy as part of a trend; she told The American Prospect that "[y]ou don't have to dig too deep to see and hear the very rampant xenophobia and anti-Muslim voices."

In mid-July 2010, supporters and opponents of the mosque organized rival marches to the Rutherford County courthouse. Around 800 people turned up, with about the same number on either side. Middle Tennesseans for Religious Freedom promoted slogans such as "Freedom of religion means freedom for all religions", while opponents circulated a petition asking the planning commission to overturn its decision and expressed concerns that the mosque's members wanted to impose Islamic law. The mosque's opponents wore "Vote for Jesus" T-shirts, carried signs with slogans such as "Keep Tennessee Terror Free", chanted "USA! USA!", conducted Christian group prayers and heard anti-mosque pastor Dusty Ray of the Heartland Baptist Church telling them, "Lord, we're trying to stop a political movement."

Televangelist Pat Robertson weighed in during August 2010, telling his TV audience, "You mark my word, if they start bringing thousands and thousands of Muslims into that relatively rural area the next thing you know they're going to be taking over the city council." Ernest Burgess, the mayor of Rutherford County, called Robertson's claims "so ridiculous they do not deserve a response." Opposition was also fanned by a local newspaper, the ultra-conservative Rutherford Reader, which published numerous anti-Islamic articles. After protests from readers over these, some of its advertisers boycotted the newspaper. As the barrage of criticism from right-wingers continued, the ICM received a series of threatening and offensive anonymous telephone messages.

Reviewing the controversy, the Nashville daily newspaper The Tennessean noted that in 1929 another faith group which was controversial at the time had faced opposition, led by the Ku Klux Klan, to its establishment in Murfreesboro. The building of the Roman Catholic church of St. Rose of Lima had prompted a march by angry residents to the town courthouse to highlight their fears that the project would endanger their security and way of life, amid claims that "suspicious outsiders" were funding it. The church was built to serve recently arrived Irish, German and Italian immigrants.

The newspaper highlighted four factors driving the opposition to the mosque: a dislike of immigrants, a fear that Christianity was losing its grip on a Bible Belt heartland, a "swell of fear and hatred" prompted by terrorist attacks, and the insecurity of the worst economic climate since the Great Depression. In past slumps, Chinese immigrants had been ostracized for being non-Christians, Catholics had been ostracized for being "the wrong kind of Christians", and this time Muslims were suffering the brunt of prejudice. Rabbi Rami Shapiro noted that "Muslims are in the way of God's plan" for some anti-Muslim Christian Zionists, who believe that Muslims in Iran and Iraq will be forced out of their homes by Israeli expansion that will pave the way for the Second Coming of Jesus. Professor Ron Messier, who teaches Islamic studies and lives in Murfreesboro, commented: "It's happened because this is an election year and I think there were some political candidates who thought that, here in Middle Tennessee, a lot of people have very right leanings and they could gain some political leverage by promoting fear about people who have been here for 20 years or more without ever being an issue."

== Litigation and attacks against the ICM ==
The Planning Commission gave final approval to the building plans in early August 2010 and on August 20, contractors broke ground on the site. A week later on August 28, an arsonist doused four excavators with an accelerant and set one on fire, destroying it. The incident was investigated by the Federal Bureau of Investigation and the Bureau of Alcohol, Tobacco, Firearms and Explosives and a $20,000 reward was announced for "information leading to the arrest of the perpetrators". Although the attack did not substantially delay the construction project, it resulted in an increase in tensions. Tennessee's governor, Phil Bredesen, responded to the incident by calling on state residents to "please have great respect for anyone's religious preferences and their rights to practice those in the United States." Republican Sue Myrick, a North Carolina member of the United States House of Representatives, called the attack "un-American".

Two days after the fire, 150 local residents attended a candle-lit vigil on the steps of the Rutherford County Courthouse to protest the arson attack. Many Christians, some of whom had sons fighting in Afghanistan, sent messages of support to the ICM which posted them on a "wall of support" in its existing building. One local resident said that the planned mosque did not "bother me because everybody has a right to practise their religion. They've been here, they're quiet. They haven't bothered anybody."

The planning commission's September 16, 2010 meeting was dominated by supporters of the mosque, who said that they represented the majority opinion in Murfreesboro and expressed concern that the controversy was hurting the town. Ernest Burgess, the Republican mayor of Murfreesboro and an elder at the North Boulevard Church of Christ, argued that it was a matter of principle to uphold the constitutions of the United States and the state of Tennessee. But the following day, several opponents of the ICM filed a lawsuit against the county to block the mosque's construction.

The litigation was spearheaded by lobbyist Laurie Cardoza-Moore, who demanded that the Rutherford County sheriff investigate a supposed conspiracy linking the mosque with Islamic militants in Somalia and Gaza. She said to a Christian television station that the mosque was part of a plot to take over Middle Tennessee. Cardoza-Moore led a group called Proclaiming Justice To The Nation (PJTN), which funded the lawsuit via donations. Some of the donors were called as witnesses in the hearing. One witness admitted that PJTN had paid him thousands of dollars to read to the court extracts from anti-Muslim Internet websites.

Kevin Fisher, an anti-mosque activist who had led the July protest march, was one of the three plaintiffs. He claimed that the planning commission had improperly rushed the application process in an attempt to avoid a panic among the local population, a claim dismissed by the director of the commission. He had walked out of the planning commission's meeting the previous day, telling the Murfreesboro Post newspaper, "All I heard was this socialist garbage being spewed by the pro-mosque crowd. It was too much. The things that they represent offend me."

The plaintiffs asked for a temporary restraining order to halt construction and called for the construction permit to be nullified, arguing that the planning commission had broken state law by not giving adequate notice of the meeting at which the ICM's building plans had been approved. They also claimed that the project put local residents at risk because "there was considerable evidence of elevated risks to the public safety of citizens of Rutherford County from the proposed ICM compound." The plaintiffs said they "have been and will be irreparably harmed by the risk of terrorism generated by proselytising for Islam and inciting the practices of sharia law."

The Anti-Defamation League intervened in the case, Estes v. Rutherford County Regional Planning Commission, to support the mosque on the grounds that the plaintiffs were seeking to interfere with the builders' religious freedoms. The ADL's amicus brief pointed out that the Religious Land Use and Institutionalized Persons Act (RLUIPA) requires courts to "apply a strict standard for reviewing laws that substantially burden religious exercise." The United States Department of Justice also submitted an amicus brief to support the county's position. As well as reiterating the requirements of RLUIPA, the Justice Department's brief affirmed that Islam was protected under the First Amendment to the United States Constitution and emphasized that mosques should be treated no differently from churches or synagogues. The local U.S. Attorney, Jerry Martin, commented that the suggestion by the plaintiffs that Islam was not a religion was "quite simply ridiculous." He told a press conference that "[a]ll three branches of government have repeatedly recognized Islam as a religion. Presidents, as far back as Lincoln and Jefferson and as recent as President George W. Bush, have, indeed, publicly recognized Islam as one of the world's largest religions."

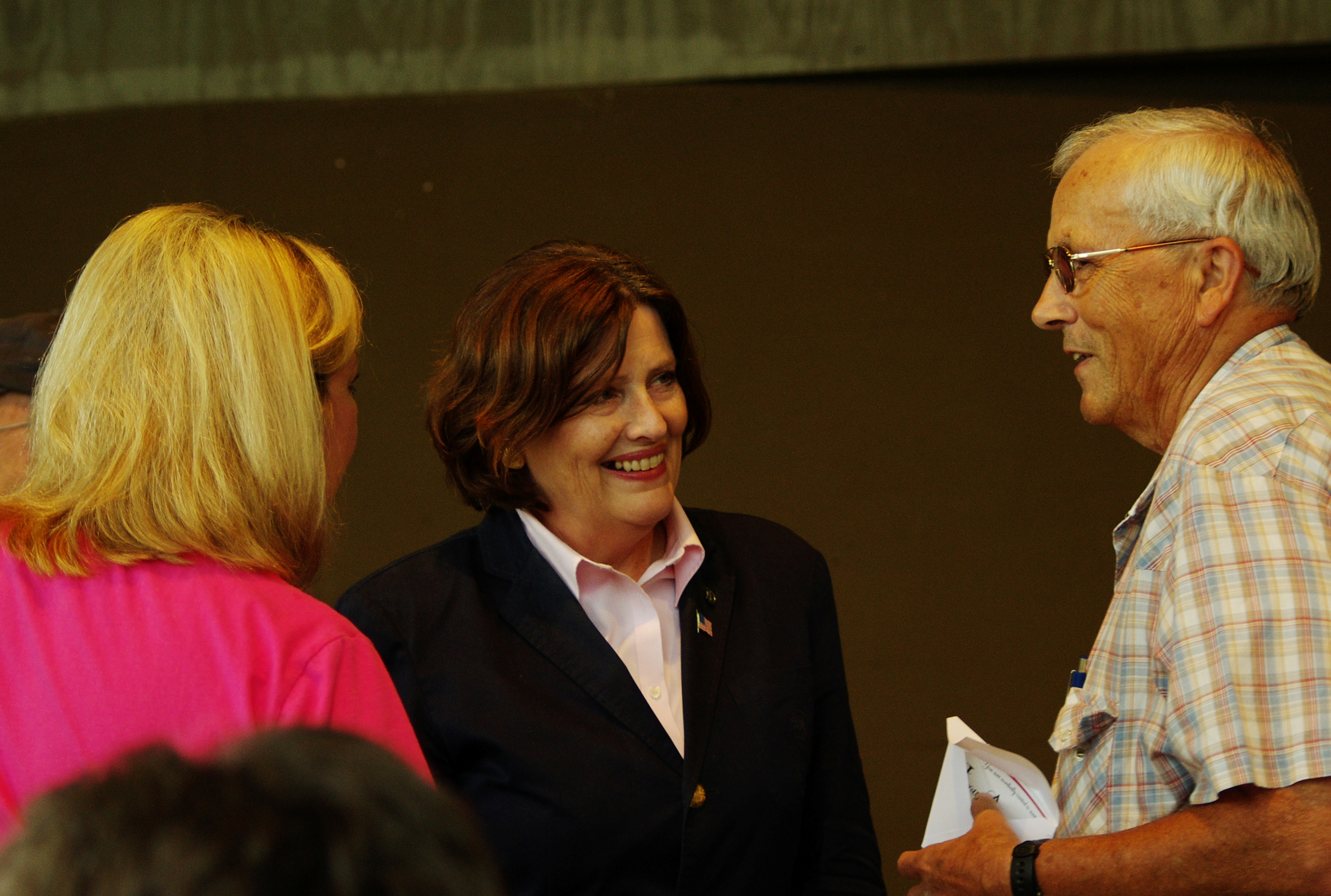
Lou Ann Zelenik (center), the former Rutherford County Republican chair who opposed the mosque project, attended the hearings in support of the plaintiffs' case

The plaintiffs' lawyer spent six days trying to convince the court that Islam should not be considered a religion and that the mosque was not entitled to religious land use zoning regulations "because these are the same people who flew jets into the World Trade Center on 9/11." The lawyer, Joe Brandon Jr, called a series of non-expert witnesses, including anti-Islam activist Frank Gaffney, accused the ICM of being linked to terrorism, and claimed that its members wanted to impose Sharia law on the United States. The proceedings were criticized by the county's attorney as a "circus". The media compared the case to the 1925 Scopes Monkey Trial, at which evolution was effectively put on trial, while Miami Herald columnist Leonard Pitts characterized the mosque's opponents as a "clownish band of bigots".

On November 17, 2010 Rutherford County Chancellor Robert Corlew refused to halt construction, and found that the county had not "acted illegally, arbitrarily or capriciously" in approving the plans. He said that there were some legitimate concerns about the county's public notice requirements and suggested that they should be reviewed, but found that the ICM's members did not adhere to extremist religious ideas. In his ruling, he dismissed the plaintiffs' claims that "Kevin Fisher, an African American Christian, would be subject to being a second-class citizen under Sharia law; Lisa Moore would be targeted for death under Sharia law because she's a Jewish female; Henry Golzynski has been harmed because he lost a son fighting in Fallujah, Iraq, by insurgents pursuing jihad as dictated by Sharia law."

Controversy over the mosque continued despite the failure of the lawsuit. In July 2011, Herman Cain, a former pizza tycoon and candidate for the 2012 U.S. Republican Party presidential nomination, told Fox News that communities, including the residents of Murfreesboro, should have the right to block mosques being built in their areas. He said that the Murfreesboro project was "not a mosque for religious purposes". His remarks were strongly criticized by commentators. Stephen Fotopulos of the Tennessee Immigrant and Refugee Rights Coalition said Cain's comments "demonstrate[d] a profound misunderstanding of the U.S. Constitution." The ICM's imam Ossama Bahloul said it was "sad to hear these words coming from a GOP presidential candidate, who is not only supposed to believe in but should also uphold the US constitution. Mr. Cain is encouraged to educate himself about the first amendment and learn more about our peaceful and productive Muslim community in Murfreesboro."

The controversy affected the building project, with some contractors becoming reluctant to work on it, and community relations. According to Professor Saleh Sbenaty of Middle Tennessee State University, a board member of the ICM, "kids [began] asking their mothers who have head scarves not to go to the malls because they're scared of seeing their mom being harassed," while adults had become "afraid to come to the mosque and pray." One contractor told ICM officials that although he needed the work, "I don't want to get on bad terms with my preacher." The ICM had to pay significantly more for the project because of contractors' reluctance to work on it. It also had to hire a security guard to protect the Veals Road construction site and install a security system in its existing building.

Chancellor Corlew had rejected the claims that the county acted improperly is permitting construction of the mosque. But in September 2011 he granted the plaintiffs permission to challenge whether the county's approval of the mosque had violated open meeting laws. A few days later, an anonymous caller left a bomb threat on the ICM's voicemail, accompanied by "extreme profanities and derogatory remarks toward Muslims." Federal authorities later arrested and charged Javier Alan Correa, a 24-year-old resident of Corpus Christi, Texas. Correa was charged with violating the civil rights of mosque members by infringing on their religious freedom and faced up to 30 years' imprisonment and a fine of up to $250,000 if convicted. He pleaded guilty and was sentenced to five years' probation, including eight months of home detention, on a charge of obstructing the free exercise of religious beliefs.

== Further litigation and federal intervention ==
In the fall of 2011, seventeen plaintiffs filed a lawsuit against Rutherford County, alleging that it had violated Tennessee's open-meetings law. Their attorney said that the approval of the mosque violated the plaintiffs' constitutional rights, on the grounds that "mosque members were compelled by their religion to subdue non-Muslims." This was rejected by Chancellor Corlew, leaving the question of whether there had been sufficient public notice for the planning commission's meeting of May 24, 2010 as the only remaining issue to be decided.

The issue of whether adequate notice had been given was complicated by the fact that Tennessee law did not define what would count as adequate, and the issue had never been satisfactorily settled in court. The county contended that the notice that had been given – an advertisement in the Sunday edition of the local free newspaper and on that paper's website – met the requirements of the law. Its attorney, Josh McCreary, noted that the approval of the mosque had been a routine matter that had not been controversial at the time. He said that the public controversy had been stirred up by the plaintiffs after the fact to make the situation "notorious". He told the court: "In this instance, everything they are relying on to prove this is a matter of pervasive public importance came after the lawsuit was filed".

Chancellor Corlew ruled in favor of the plaintiffs on May 29, 2012, finding that the county had not given adequate public notice to the planning commission's meeting. The ruling found that only about 196 copies of The Murfreesboro Post newspaper, in which the meeting was advertised, had been distributed in unincorporated areas of Rutherford County, where a third of the county's population lived. The county had also failed to advertise the meeting on its website or local cable channel, which officials acknowledged had been an oversight. Corlew stated in his opinion that because of the great public interest in the mosque, the county should have taken extra steps to make the public aware of the meeting. Although the ruling voided the planning commission's approval, the judge noted that the commission was free to reconsider the issue and come to a fresh decision as long as it was taken for "non-discriminatory reasons."

The judge did not order a halt to the mosque's construction, which was by that point nearly finished. Its opponents returned to court to ask for construction to be suspended. Their bid was rejected by Chancellor Corlew, who ruled that a separate motion would need to be filed. The opponents' subsequent motion to halt construction was denied by Corlew on June 13, but he ruled that the county could not issue the ICM with an occupancy certificate because he had previously voided the approval of the site plan. On June 22, the county appealed the judgment and requested that the court lift the injunction on issuing an occupancy certificate. The request was turned down on July 2, meaning that the full court process – taking up to a year – would be required.

Federal court pleadings and order:

- Temporary Restraining Order issued by the United States District Court for the Middle District of Tennessee, July 18, 2012
- Islamic Center vs Rutherford County Complaint, July 18, 2012
- Islamic Center vs Rutherford County Memorandum in Support of Plaintiffs’ Application for a Temporary Restraining Order, July 18, 2012
- Islamic Center vs Rutherford County Plaintiffs’ Application for a Temporary Restraining Order or Preliminary Injunction, July 18, 2012

But on July 18, however, the US Department of Justice filed a lawsuit in the United States District Court for the Middle District of Tennessee, alleging that the county violated the Religious Land Use and Institutionalized Persons Act by Corlew's decision. The ICM also filed suit in the same US District Court. The Justice Department's filing criticized Corlew for treating the mosque unequally by imposing a heightened requirement of notice of a kind to which other religious organizations had not been subject. Judge Todd Campbell issued a temporary restraining order requiring the county to conduct a final inspection and to issue a certificate of occupancy if the inspection showed that the structure complied with the building code and applicable regulations. In response, Chancellor Corlew stayed his own actions under the doctrine of Federal preemption, but made it clear that he had been preparing to order cessation of construction had the federal authorities not stepped in. The mosque's opponents filed a motion in the federal district court, claiming that Judge Campbell had accepted "false allegations" and questioning whether Islam was a religion.

The local US Representative, Republican Diane Black, and her primary opponent, Lou Anne Zelenik, both issued statements criticizing the federal intervention. Black said: "Christians' rights to freedom of religion are violated frequently and the Obama Justice Department doesn't come rushing to our aid, but they will meddle in a local zoning matter to promote Islam." The mosque's imam, Ossama Bahloul, told the media that the ruling was a victory for religious freedom: "We are here to celebrate the freedom of religion and that the concept of liberty is a fact existing in this nation. The winner today is not an individual, the winner today is our nation and the fact that our Constitution prevailed." Luke Goodrich of The Becket Fund for Religious Liberty, a national civil liberties organization, said:

No congregation should have its right of religious liberty curtailed solely because some of its neighbors disapprove of its religious beliefs. No religion is an island. When the rights of one faith are abridged, the rights of all faiths are threatened. All faiths have the right to worship God in freedom and in peace.

== Opening ==
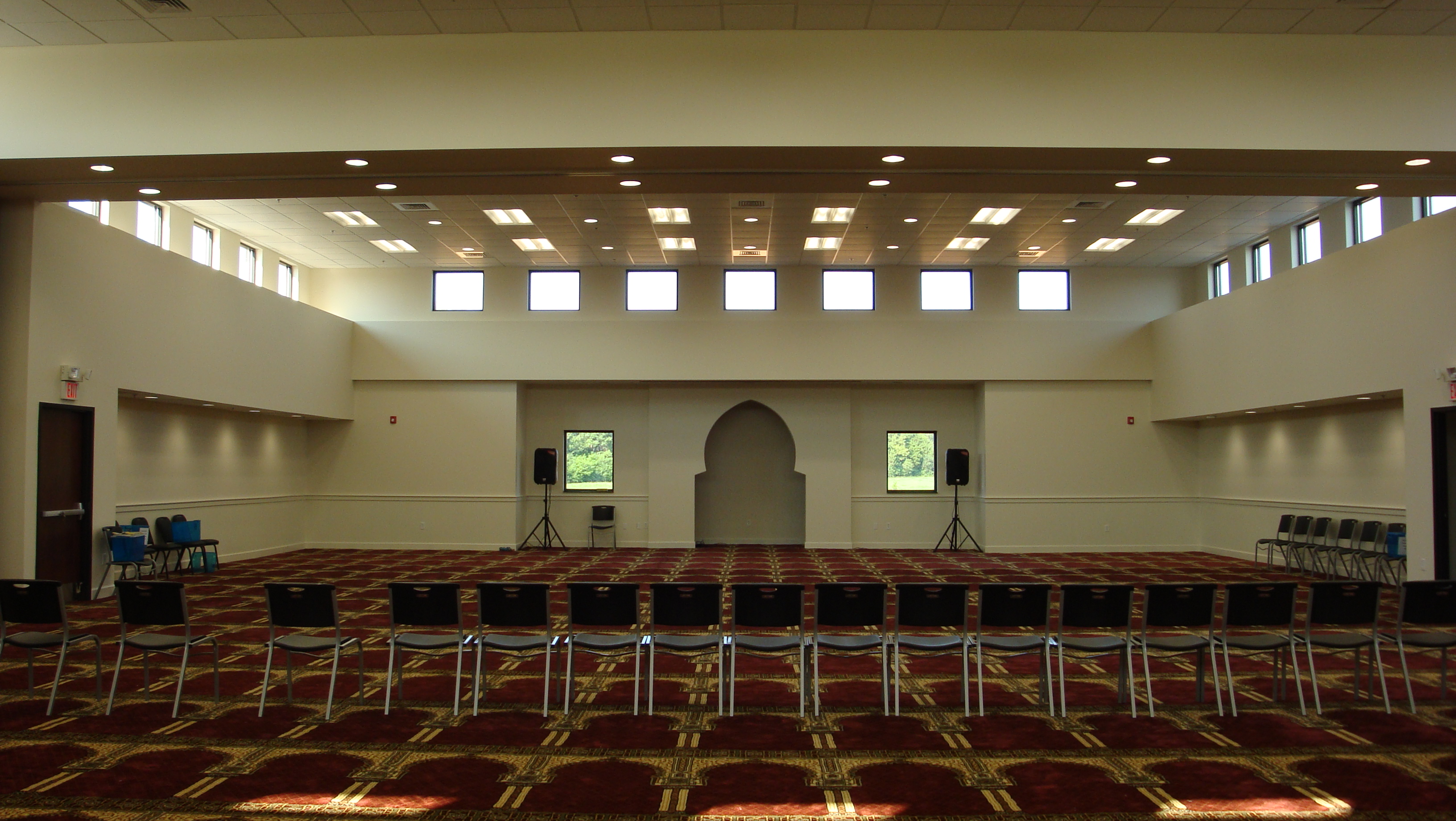
Interior of the new mosque

After final safety checks, the new mosque received a temporary certificate of occupancy on August 7, 2012, during Ramadan. The building opened on August 10 for Friday prayers. Although there were concerns about public safety, the occasion passed off peacefully. A single opponent turned up in an "I Love Jesus" hat and told reporters that he was there to "represent the Christians".

Shortly before the opening, members of the neighboring Grace Baptist Church erected 13 white crosses in a field across the road from the mosque "to make a statement to the Muslims about how we felt about our religion, our Christianity. We wanted them to see the crosses and know how we felt about things." Ossama Bahloul of the ICM told worshippers, "This day is a day of forgiveness. We want to say that we have nothing bad in our heart against anyone." The New York Times praised the forbearance of the ICM's members in an editorial published on August 19, noting that "[w]ith patience and dignity, the Islamic Americans of Murfreesboro learned the hard way the endless American lesson that constitutional rights don't come guaranteed."

The mosque received its permanent certificate of occupancy on August 23 after the county completed its inspections of the new building. However, the litigation continued as the mosque's opponents sought to intervene in the federal case and the county continued its appeal to a higher state court against Chancellor Corlew's May decision. The litigation against the mosque's opening finally came to an end on June 2, 2014 when a bid by opponents to appeal the ruling to the Supreme Court of the United States was rebuffed, with the court declining to take the case. The four-year litigation had by this point cost the county more than $340,000 in legal fees. One positive outcome of the dispute, according to a spokesperson for the Nashville-based American Center for Outreach, was that it had prompted local Muslims to build closer ties to local interfaith groups and become more engaged in the community, from which they had received a great deal of support.

Mosque opponents also attempted to block the construction of a cemetery adjacent to the complex, filing a suit in a state court. The suit was dismissed by a senior judge on June 19, 2014, with no further possibility of appeals.

== See also ==
- List of mosques in the Americas
- Lists of mosques
- List of mosques in the United States
