= Cherokee Highway =

1995 song by Western Flyer

Single by Western Flyer

from the album Western Flyer
- Released: February 20, 1995
- Genre: Country
- Length: 4:45
- Label: Step One (US); Royalty (CAN)
- Songwriters: Danny Myrick; Tony Wood
- Producers: Ray Pennington; Western Flyer

Western Flyer singles chronology
"She Should've Been Mine" (1994)	"Cherokee Highway" (1995)	"Friday Night Stampede" (1995)

"Cherokee Highway" is a song by American country music band Western Flyer. It was released in 1995 as the third single off the band's self-titled debut album. Lead singer Danny Myrick co-wrote the song with Tony Wood, and the band co-produced the song with Ray Pennington.

== Content ==
"Cherokee Highway" is a song about racial unrest in a fictional town in Mississippi in 1961. The song begins describing the friendship between two boys: a black one named Willie and a white one named Kevin. After Willie's father dies at the hands of the Ku Klux Klan, Kevin asks his father to help, only to discover that his father is one of the Klansmen. Kevin's father's house is then burned down in an act of revenge and Willie enters in an attempt to rescue him, only for both of them to die in the fire. During the chorus, lead vocalist Danny Myrick sings "The blood still runs down Cherokee Highway" in reference to the acts of violence.

== History ==
Danny Myrick wrote the song with Tony Wood. Myrick told the Wilkes-Barre Times Leader that he "wanted to make sure it was bold, but without sounding like a sermon". He also told the publication that the song's inspiration came from acts of racial disputes that he saw in his hometown of Pascagoula, Mississippi. The Deseret News writer Shirley Jinkins also cited the song as an example of social activism in country music at the time, contrasting it with the themes of domestic violence in Martina McBride's "Independence Day", recovering from alcoholism in Collin Raye's "Little Rock", and HIV/AIDS in Reba McEntire's "She Thinks His Name Was John". At the time of the song's release, Martin Luther King Jr.'s widow Coretta Scott King invited the band to perform it at the Martin Luther King Jr. Birthday Bash in Atlanta, Georgia. Western Flyer also performed the song at the Country Radio Seminar in Nashville, Tennessee in February 1995. A music video for the song was filmed on February 6 and 7, 1995; preceding the song's release to radio on February 20.

== Critical reception ==
Tom Roland of The Tennessean called the song his favorite country release of the year, praising the message as well as Western Flyer's musicianship. A review in Gavin Report was also favorable, stating that "the guys rip into it with conviction."

== Chart performance ==
The song was released in 1995 through Step One Records. Although it did not enter the Billboard country music charts, it was a top 40 hit on the charts published by Cashbox, where it peaked at number 34 on the chart dated May 6, 1995. For distribution in Canada, Step One partnered with the Canadian label Royalty Records for distribution. It entered the RPM Country Tracks charts in Canada, debuting at number 91 on the chart dated for May 8, 1995 and peaking at number 38 on the chart dated July 17, 1995.

Chart (1995)	Peak position
Canada Country Tracks (RPM)	38
U.S. Top 100 Country Singles (Cashbox)	34
