= Laurie Cardoza-Moore =

American activist and film producer (born 1962)

- Born: February 20, 1962 (age 64); Fort Lauderdale, Florida, U.S.
- Education: University of Florida
- Occupations: Activist, television host, film producer
- Political party: Republican
- Spouse: Stan Moore
- Children: 5

Laurie Cardoza-Moore (born February 20, 1962) is an American activist, film producer and evangelical leader who hosts the television program Focus On Israel on NRB TV.

She became known in 2010 for campaigning against the Islamic Center of Murfreesboro, which led some to describe her as anti-Muslim. She is also known for campaigning for anti-BDS laws and against controversial school textbooks. As Special Envoy to the United Nations, she states to focus on human rights abuses against Jews, Christians and Muslims.

In 2022, she ran unsuccessfully in the Republican primary for Tennessee House of Representatives District 63 against Jake McCalmon.

== Early life ==
Cardoza-Moore was born in Fort Lauderdale, Florida. She grew up as a Catholic, but later became evangelical Christian and discovered that she may be descendant from Portuguese Jews who were forced to convert to Catholicism during the Inquisition. She received an associate degree from the University of Florida in 1981, and the KD Conservatory College of Film and Dramatic Arts in 1987. She later moved to Franklin, Tennessee, from where she based her activism.

== Political activism ==
As a Christian Zionist, Cardoza-Moore is the founder and president of Proclaiming Justice to the Nations (PJTN), a counter-jihad grassroots organization committed to fighting anti-Semitism and defending Israel. PJTN was once deemed an anti-Muslim "hate group" by the Southern Poverty Law Center, although this designation was later removed.

She became known for leading the campaign against the construction of the new Islamic Center of Murfreesboro in 2010, and appeared in interviews on national television such as CNN, CBN and The Daily Show arguing for "stopping the advance of radical Islam in America." She charged that members involved in the construction effort had ties to Islamist terrorist organizations, alleging ties with extremists in Somalia and Gaza. Legal actions by the PJTN against the expansion of the mosque continued until they were finally dismissed in 2014.

She was appointed Special Envoy to the United Nations for the World Council of Independent Christian Churches in 2011, where she has focused on Middle East Affairs, Jewish and Christian relations and Human Rights and has had briefings with UN Secretary-General Ban Ki-moon. In this capacity she represents 44 million Christian congregants worldwide.

In 2013, she gained nationwide attention for campaigning against a geography textbook used in her school district that asked students if a Palestinian suicide bomber who kills "several dozen Israeli teenagers in a Jerusalem restaurant" is "acting as a terrorist or as a soldier fighting a war." The publisher eventually removed the line from future editions.

Her organization was the driving force behind a bill passed in the Tennessee state legislature in 2015 that condemned Boycott, Divestment and Sanctions (BDS) against Israel as anti-Semitic, the first such action taken by any state legislature in the US. Later that year, she travelled to Israel for a three-week trip, handed Knesset speaker Yuli Edelstein a framed copy of the resolution. She has later pushed for similar resolutions in other states.

She has called on the US Justice Department "to launch a full and thorough investigation" into Congresswoman Ilhan Omar's "possible connections to the Muslim Brotherhood," and has accused Omar of being a "Hamas plant" in Congress.

In 2020, she spread misinformation about the presidential election while urging people to "defend our Constitutional Republic" before the January 6 United States Capitol attack, where she stated she would be present. She has been accused of tapping active-duty military officials and veterans to join the insurrection. She later blamed the attack on antifa.

She has worked with Florida Governor Ron DeSantis to make the Hebrew Bible a requirement in Florida public schools, claiming that the US is "founded on Torah". She received praise from a spokesman for DeSantis for her review of textbooks that "caught and corrected dozens of books to prevent political indoctrination of Florida's children."

She has vocally criticized conservative commentators Candace Owens and Tucker Carlson for their "Jew-hatred", calling their ideas "heresy" and "demonic".

In 2025, she was ranked second in the Jerusalem Post's list of the “10 pro-Israel Christians” in the paper’s Influencers 25 project in light of her being a prominent Christian Zionist advocate for Israel.

== Commission appointment and election ==
Cardoza-Moore has accused the US education system of promoting "anti-American propaganda" on Fox & Friends. In 2021, she was appointed to the Tennessee Textbook and Instructional Materials Quality Commission, nominated by House Speaker Cameron Sexton, which is responsible for recommending textbooks and instructional materials to the Tennessee Department of Education. The appointment was criticized by the Council on American–Islamic Relations (CAIR) for her "anti-Muslim rhetoric", as well as dozens of local faith leaders who signed a letter from the American Muslim Advisory Council. The Memphis Flyer also criticized her appointment as a "Mosque-Fighting, Insurrectionist, Vax Hoaxer, 9/11 Truther" and "anti-Black Lives Matter". She denied being a 9/11 truther during a hearing on the appointment, a claim which was based on a textbook review from her organization.

In 2022, she narrowly lost in the Republican primary for Tennessee House of Representatives District 63 against Jake McCalmon. She received 41.9% of the votes against McCalmon's 44.4%.

== Personal life ==
Cardoza-Moore has five children whom she has homeschooled. She is married to Stan Moore, a two-time Emmy Awards-winning film producer and director.

She refers to herself with the degree ThD, an honorary doctorate in theology she received from the Latin University of Theology, which is described as an unaccredited diploma mill.

== Works ==
=== Films and Television series ===
- Lest We Forget (2006), producer
- The Forgotten People (2007), producer
- The Forgotten People: Christianity and the Holocaust (2009), co-producer
- Focus on Israel (2012)
- Disinformation (2013), associate producer
- Israel Indivisible (2014), producer
- Boycott This! (2016), producer
