= Western Flyer =

American country music band

- The members of Western Flyer at a reunion dinner in 2011 (from left to right: Danny Myrick, Chris Marion, Roger Helton, Steve Charles, TJ Klay, and Bruce Gust)

Background information
- Origin: Nashville, Tennessee, U.S.
- Genres: Country
- Years active: 1992–1997
- Labels: Step One
- Past members: Steve Charles; Bruce Gust; T. J. Klay; Chris Marion; Danny Myrick; Roger Helton

Western Flyer was an American country music band founded in 1992 in Nashville, Tennessee. The band consisted of Danny Myrick (lead vocals, bass guitar), Chris Marion (keyboards, vocals), T. J. Klay (harmonica, mandolin, vocals), Bruce Gust (drums, vocals), Steve Charles (lead guitar, vocals), and Roger Helton (acoustic guitar, banjo, vocals). The band released two albums for Step One Records, as well as six singles. Their highest peaking single is "What Will You Do with M-E?", which reached No. 32 on the Billboard country charts in 1996. After Western Flyer disbanded, Marion joined the Little River Band, and Myrick began writing songs for other artists.

== History ==
Western Flyer was founded in 1992 by lead singer and bass guitarist Danny Myrick and keyboardist Chris Marion. Completing the lineup were harmonicist/mandolinist T.J. Klay, drummer Bruce Gust, lead guitarist Steve Charles, and guitarist/banjoist Roger Helton. The band members met in Nashville at a church where some of them had been playing in the church band. The band took the name Western Flyer from a brand of bicycle.

The group signed to the independent Step One Records label in 1993, and released a self-titled debut album a year later. This album accounted for five chart singles, of which four reached the lower regions of the Billboard country charts. The album's third release, "Cherokee Highway", did not chart in the U.S., although it was a Top 40 hit on the RPM Country Tracks charts and received media attention for its story of interracial violence.

Western Flyer's second album, 1996's Back in America, produced its highest charting single in "What Will You Do with M-E?" which reached No. 32 on the U.S. country charts. Also included on this album were "She Wants to Be Wanted Again," which Ty Herndon also released on his 1996 album Living in a Moment and released as a single in 1997, and "Lost in You", which received a "Critic's Choice" review in Billboard. Back in America produced no other chart singles, and Western Flyer disbanded in 1997. Marion subsequently joined the Little River Band, a rock group, in 2004. Danny Myrick signed to a songwriting contract with 3 Ring Circus Music, which is owned by Jeffrey Steele. Myrick has co-written "International Harvester" for Craig Morgan, "Loud" for Big & Rich, the Number One hit "She's Country" for Jason Aldean, and "How Far Do You Wanna Go?" by Gloriana.

== Western Flyer (1994) ==
Western Flyer

Studio album by Western Flyer
- Released: August 20, 1994
- Genre: Country
- Label: Step One No. 85
- Producer: Ray Pennington, Western Flyer

Western Flyer chronology
Western Flyer (1994)	Back in America (1996)

=== Track listing ===
1. "Western Flyer" (Danny Myrick, Tony Wood) – 3:53
2. "She Should've Been Mine" (Kent Blazy, Jim Dowell, Rob Crosby) – 3:41
3. "His Memory" (Donny Kees, Richard Ross) – 3:20
4. "Cherokee Highway" (Myrick, Wood) – 4:45
5. "I Would Give Anything" (Roger Ball) – 3:10
6. "Friday Night Stampede" (Marcus Hummon, Monty Powell) – 3:07
7. "Liar's Moon" (Myrick, Don Pfrimmer, Philip Douglas) – 2:41
8. "A Hundred Others Like It" (Myrick, Wood) – 2:45
9. "The One Who Understands" (Greg Barnhill, Richard Bach) – 3:43
10. "Pathway to the Moon" (Hummon, Michael Puryear) – 3:43

=== Personnel ===
==== Western Flyer ====
- Steve Charles- electric guitar, background vocals
- Bruce Gust- drums, percussion, background vocals
- Roger Helton- banjo, fiddle, acoustic guitar, background vocals
- T.J. Klay- acoustic guitar, harmonica, mandolin, background vocals
- Chris Marion- keyboards, background vocals
- Danny Myrick- bass guitar, lead vocals

==== Additional musicians ====
- Cory Hutchinson- background vocals
- Steve Mauldin- string arrangements
- Kris Wilkinson- strings

== Back in America (1996) ==
Back in America

Studio album by Western Flyer
- Released: July 23, 1996
- Genre: Country
- Label: Step One No. 98
- Producer: Ray Pennington, Western Flyer

Western Flyer chronology
Western Flyer (1994)	Back in America (1996)

=== Track listing ===
1. "Back in America" (Layng Martine, Jr.) – 3:52
2. "Lost in You" (Bryan Smith) – 3:36
3. "Wish You Were Here" (Bob Dellaposta) – 3:54
4. "Surrender" (Joe Diffie, Kent Blazy, Lonnie Wilson) – 2:52
5. "I Know Where You're Coming From" (Jerry Taylor, Ashe Underwood) – 3:41
6. "What Will You Do with M-E?" (Craig Martin, Rick Tiger) – 4:38
7. "New Tin Roof" (Chapin Hartford, Jeff Moseley) – 3:11
8. "She Wants to Be Wanted Again" (Billy Henderson, Steven Dale Jones) – 4:09
9. "Less Than a Minute" (Tommy Barnes) – 3:15
10. "Black and Blue" (Danny Myrick, Tony Wood) – 3:05
11. "Rhythm of the Highway" (Myrick, Wood) – 4:17
12. "Sixteen Tons" (Merle Travis) – 8:14

=== Personnel ===
==== Western Flyer ====
- Steve Charles - electric guitar, background vocals
- Bruce Gust - drums, percussion, background vocals
- Roger Helton - banjo, fiddle, acoustic guitar, background vocals
- T.J. Klay - acoustic guitar, harmonica, mandolin, background vocals
- Chris Marion - keyboards, piano, background vocals
- Danny Myrick - lead vocals

==== Additional Musicians ====
- Bobby All - acoustic guitar
- Kelly Back - electric guitar
- Buddy Emmons - steel guitar
- Aubrey Haynie - fiddle
- Dirk Johnson - keyboards, piano
- Jerry Kroon - drums
- Gary Prim - keyboards, piano
- W. David Smith - bass guitar
- Kevin Williams - acoustic guitar

== Singles ==
Year	Single	Peak chart positions		Album
Year	Single	US Country	CAN Country	Album
1994	"Western Flyer"	61	—	Western Flyer
1994	"She Should've Been Mine"	62	—	Western Flyer
1995	"Cherokee Highway" (Note: "Cherokee Highway" peaked at number 34 on Cashbox Top 100 Country Singles.)	—	38	Western Flyer
1995	"Friday Night Stampede"	71	62	Western Flyer
1995	"His Memory"	74	80	Western Flyer
1996	"What Will You Do with M-E?"	32	36	Back in America
1997	"Wish You Were Here"	—	—	Back in America
1997	"Lost in You"	—	—	Back in America
"—" denotes releases that did not chart

== Music videos ==
Year	Video	Director
1994	"Western Flyer"	Greg Crutcher
1994	"She Should've Been Mine"	Greg Crutcher
1995	"Cherokee Highway"	Greg Crutcher
