= The Geezinslaw Brothers =

American country music duo

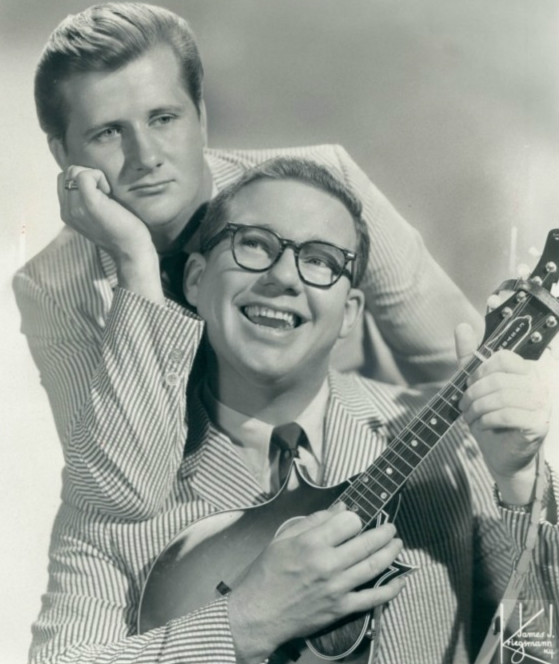
- The Geezinslaw Brothers in 1968

Background information
- Also known as: The Geezinslaws
- Origin: Austin, Texas, United States
- Genres: Country
- Years active: 1950s-2005
- Labels: Capitol, Lone Star, Step One
- Past members: Sammy Allred; DeWayne Smith/Dr. Ron Teofan/Jody "Slick" Meredith; Bill "Wichita" Wise; Larry Telford

The Geezinslaw Brothers, also known as The Geezinslaws, were an Austin, Texas-based country music comedy duo consisting of Sammy Allred (vocals, mandolin; May 5, 1934 – May 9, 2018) and Dewayne "Son" Smith (vocals, guitar; September 19, 1942 – March 16, 2019). They performed for more than 50 years and released numerous recordings over a 40+ year span from 1963 to 2005.

The group started as The Geezinslaw Brothers in the 1950s. They once opened for Elvis Presley and were regulars on the Louisiana Hayride radio show.

In 1961, Arthur Godfrey invited them on his show, giving the duo their big break. They landed a record deal with Columbia Records and released their debut album The Kooky World of the Geezinslaw Brothers in 1963. They moved to New York City and changed record labels to Capitol Records, where they recorded four more albums between 1966 and 1969. The duo made the country Top 100 three times during their stint with Capitol, but never cracked the Top 40.

The Geezinslaw Brothers made guest appearances on The Ed Sullivan Show, The Jackie Gleason Show and Hootenanny and toured with Roger Miller and Perry Como. They became regulars on Ralph Emery's radio program Pop! Goes the Country. In 1986, they appeared on Nashville Now, another show hosted by Ralph Emery. They also made guest appearances on The Jimmy Dean Show, an hour-long country variety show.

The Geezinslaw Brothers released only one album each decade in the 1970s and 1980s. In 1979, they released an album for Willie Nelson's short-lived Lone Star label titled "If You Think I'm Crazy Now..." In 1989, the band, now calling themselves just the Geezinslaws, released a self-titled album on the Step One label.

In 1993, the group received the National Association of Record Merchandisers "Indie Best Seller Award" for their recording, Feelin' Good, Gittin' Up, Gittin' Down. This album also gave them their first chart single in over two decades with "Help, I’m White and I Can't Get Down."

The group appeared on Austin City Limits three times. The Austin Music Awards inducted the Geezinslaws into its Hall of Fame for 2005.

The Geezinslaws last release, Eclectic Horsemen (2005), has guest performances by Willie Nelson, Kinky Friedman and Kelly Willis.

Sammy Allred also worked in radio on and off for over forty years, much of the time as a radio personality on KVET in Austin. He is a member of the Texas Radio Hall of Fame and won the Country Music Association Personality of the Year Award in 2006 and 2007 and the Billboard Personality of the Year Award in 1971 and 1997.

Sammy Allred died on May 9, 2018, in Austin, Texas, at age 84. Dewayne Smith (aka Son Geezinslaw; born Raymond D. Smith) died on March 16, 2019, at age 76.

== Discography ==
=== Albums ===
| Year | Album | US Country | Label |
|---|---|---|---|
| 1963 | The Kooky World of the Geezinslaw Brothers | | Columbia |
| 1966 | Can You Believe...The Geezinslaw Brothers! | 33 | Capitol |
| 1967 | My Dirty Lowdown Rotten Cotton-Pickin' Little Darlin' | 36 | Capitol |
| 1968 | The Geezinslaw Brothers & "Chubby" | 29 | Capitol |
| 1969 | The Geesinslaws Are Alive (And Well) | | Capitol |
| 1979 | If You Think I'm Crazy Now... | | Lone Star/Mercury |
| 1989 | The Geezinslaws | | Step One |
| 1990 | World Tour | | Step One |
| 1992 | Feelin' Good, Gittin' Up, Gittin' Down | | Step One |
| 1994 | Wish I Had a Job to Shove | | Step One |
| 1996 | Blah, Blah, Blah | | Step One |
| 2005 | Eclectic Horsemen | | The Geezinslaws |

=== Singles ===
| Year | Single | US Country | Album |
|---|---|---|---|
| 1966 | "You Wouldn't Put the Shuck on Me" | 66 | Can You Believe…The Geezinslaw Brothers! |
| 1967 | "Change of Wife" | 57 | My Dirty, Lowdown, Rotten, Cotton-Pickin' Little Darlin' |
| 1967 | "Chubby (Please Take Your Love to Town)" | 48 | The Geezinslaw Brothers & "Chubby" |
| 1992 | "Help, I'm White and I Can't Get Down" | 56 | Feelin' Good, Gittin' Up, Gittin' Down |

=== Music videos ===
| Year | Video | Director |
|---|---|---|
| 1992 | "Help, I'm White and I Can't Get Down" | Greg Crutcher |
| 1994 | "I Wish I Had A Job To Shove" | Philip Cheney |
