= Chilhowie High School =

Location
- 1160 East Lee Highway; Chilhowie, Virginia 24319; United States
- Coordinates: 36°48′16.3″N 81°40′28″W

Information
- School type: Public, high school
- Founded: 1959
- School district: Smyth County Schools
- Superintendent: Brad Haga
- Principal: Kelly Russell
- Grades: 9-12
- Enrollment: 416 (2016-17)
- Language: English
- Colors: Black and Orange
- Athletics: Football, Volleyball, Golf, Cross Country, Track, Basketball, Wrestling, Baseball, Softball, Swim
- Athletics conference: VHSL Class 1 VHSL Region D VHSL Hogoheegee District
- Mascot: Warrior
- Feeder schools: Chilhowie Middle School
- Website: Official Site

Chilhowie High School is located in the town of Chilhowie, Virginia. It was founded in 1959 and is part of the Smyth County School Division.

== Extra curricular activities ==
Chilhowie competes in VHSL sanctioned baseball, basketball, cross country, football, golf, softball, track, wrestling, and volleyball. Chilhowie competes academically in the Southwest Academic Conference.

=== Football ===
Chilhowie won the VHSL Group A state championship in 1970 with a score of 7–6 over Fluvanna. On September 14, 1979, Chilhowie beat Holston High School in a Hogoheegee District game 91–0.
