= Step One Records =

Defunct American country music record label

- Founded: 1984
- Founder: Ray Pennington
- Status: Defunct
- Genre: Country
- Country of origin: United States
- Location: Nashville, Tennessee

Step One Records was an independent American record label established in February 1984 in Nashville, Tennessee. The label was founded by singer-songwriter and producer Ray Pennington with Curtis Potter, the former of whom had produced for Waylon Jennings. At the time of the label's foundation, it was one of the few independent country music labels to have significant chart success, most notably in 1991, when the label released Clinton Gregory's "(If It Weren't for Country Music) I'd Go Crazy", the only independently released single on the Billboard country charts at the time of its release. The label lasted into the mid 1990s, having more visibility with Western Flyer's "Cherokee Highway" and "What Will You Do With M-E?". Other artists signed to the label included Ashley Evans, The Geezinslaws, Ray Price, Faron Young, and Pennington himself. The label closed in 1998 and the catalog is owned by Gusto Records.

== Roster ==
- Matt Benson
- Sheryl Brewer
- Don Cox
- Buddy Emmons
- Dawnett Faucett
- The Geezinslaws
- Clinton Gregory
- The Kendalls
- Speedy West And Jimmy Bryant
- Jerry Lansdowne
- Charlie McCoy
- Terry McMillan
- Ray Pennington
- Celinda Pink
- Ray Price
- Bryan Smith
- Cal Smith
- Gene Watson
- Kitty Wells
- Western Flyer
- Faron Young
