= Celinda Pink =

American singer-songwriter

- Birth name: Celinda Cosby
- Born: 1957
- Origin: Tuscaloosa, Alabama, United States
- Genres: Country
- Occupation: singer
- Instrument: Vocals
- Years active: 1993–1995
- Labels: Step One

Celinda Cosby (born 1957), known professionally as Celinda Pink, is a female country music singer. Between 1993 and 1995, she released two studio albums on Step One Records and three singles, including her 1993 single "Pack Your Lies and Go", which peaked at No. 68 on the Hot Country Singles & Tracks charts.

== Biography ==
She was born Celinda Cosby in 1957 in Tuscaloosa, Alabama. After being abandoned by her birth parents, she was raised by a foster family in Alabama. Cosby gave her first performance in the third grade, singing "Elvira" at a talent competition. After moving in with her grandparents, she also attended a reform school. There she cited the presence of African American students who would listen to soul and R&B music as an influence. She moved to Nashville, Tennessee at age 16 in an attempt to find her mother and attend Tennessee State University. After this she spent much of the 1970s singing in nightclubs around Tennessee. During this time she developed a heroin addiction for which she later went to rehabilitation, became the mother of two children, and adopted her stage name of Celinda Pink. It was in her nightclub gigs that she was discovered by promoter Buzz Ledford, who eventually helped her sign to Step One Records, an independent label. Her debut album Victimized came out in 1993 and charted the single "Pack Up Your Lies and Go". A review in Stereo Review was positive, calling Pink's voice "bluesy, ballsy, and full of rue".

A second album, Unchained, followed in 1995 also on Step One. A review published in the magazine Gavin Report was positive, noting influences of blues music in her delivery.

== Discography ==
=== Albums ===
Title	Album details
Victimized	Release date: May 10, 1993; Label: Step One Records
Unchained	Release date: November 10, 1995; Label: Step One Records

=== Singles ===
Year	Single	Peak positions	Album
Year	Single	US Country	Album
1993	"Pack Your Lies and Go"	68	Victimized
1993	"Victimized"	—	Victimized
1994	"I Don't Need No Lover Boy"	—	Victimized
"—" denotes releases that did not chart
