= Rutherford County Courthouse (Tennessee) =

- U.S. National Register of Historic Places
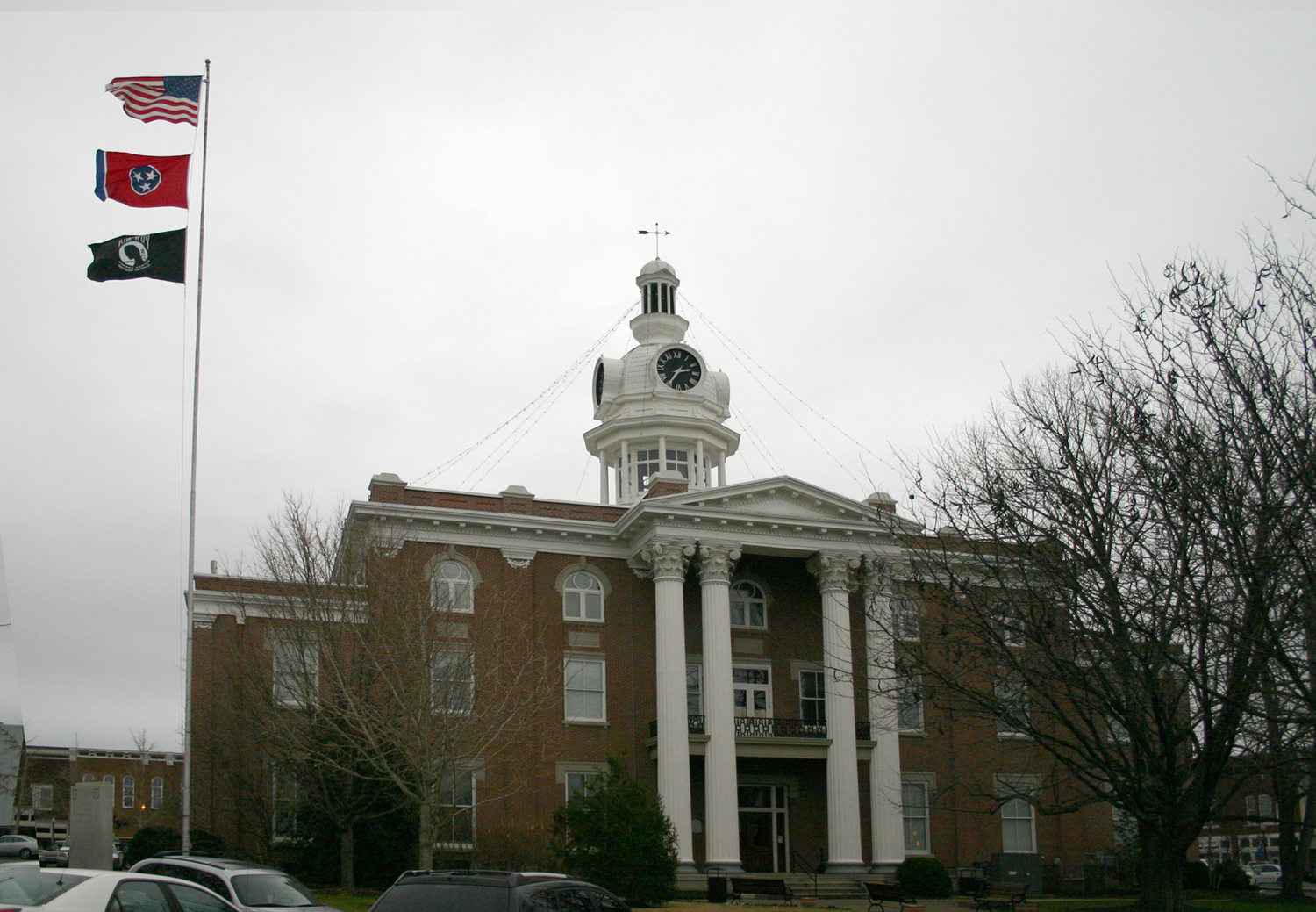

- Location within Tennessee Location within the United States
- Interactive map showing the location of Rutherford County Courthouse
- Location: Public Square, Murfreesboro, Tennessee
- Coordinates: 35°50′46″N 86°23′31″W
- Area: 6 acres (2.4 ha)
- Built: 1813 original, 1859 current building
- Architectural style: Classical Revival, Italianate
- NRHP reference No.: 73001826
- Added to NRHP: July 16, 1973

The Rutherford County Courthouse in Murfreesboro, Tennessee, is a Classical Revival building from 1859. It was listed on the National Register of Historic Places in 1973. It is one of six remaining antebellum county courthouses in Tennessee

== Early history ==
In 1813 a courthouse, jail and other buildings were built on the site occupied by the current building. The courthouse served as the seat of the state legislature until 1822 when the structure burned down. After the courthouse burnt down in 1822, the state legislature meetings were held at the local Presbyterian Church until the capitol was moved to Nashville in 1826. The population of Murfreesboro greatly declined following this, and the county would use the church as their courthouse until 1859.

== Civil War ==
A new, larger, courthouse was built in 1859 at a cost of $50,000. The original cupola was designed to reflect the Tennessee State Capitol building in Nashville. In 1860 a new bell and clock tower was constructed. During the Civil War the Courthouse was occupied by both Confederate and Union troops. Confederate troops, under the command of Gen. Nathan Bedford Forrest, occupied the area from July 1862 until the end of the Battle of Stones River in early 1863. The Courthouse then served as a headquarters for the Union army until the end of the war.

== Modern history ==
The Courthouse narrowly escaped destruction when a tornado hit Murfreesboro in 1913 which caused minor damage to the clock tower.

In the spring of 1923, a man known as the "Human Fly" announced that he would climb to the top of the Courthouse for a small fee. His ascent was successful but as he began to climb down he lost his footing and fell to his death. During WWII, to announce the first statewide blackout the Courthouse bell was rung at 9:00 PM on June 9, 1942 and the Courthouse became the site of an air raid alarm. The square surrounding the Courthouse was used for military training exercises.

During the early 1960s wings were added on either side of the original 1859 building to accommodate the need for additional space. Although, there have been no major constructions on the site since then the interior was renovated in 1998 to its original 19th-century appearance.

There is a popular local legend which states there are a series of tunnels, possibly for escape or transferring funds to nearby banks, running from the Courthouse to various locations. No such tunnels have been discovered, although small (and limited) subterranean structures do exist such as drainage pipes.

The historic courthouse no longer hosts the county's various courts, which are now located in the Rutherford County Judicial Building that opened on April 25, 2018, on West Lytle Street.

== Courthouse grounds ==
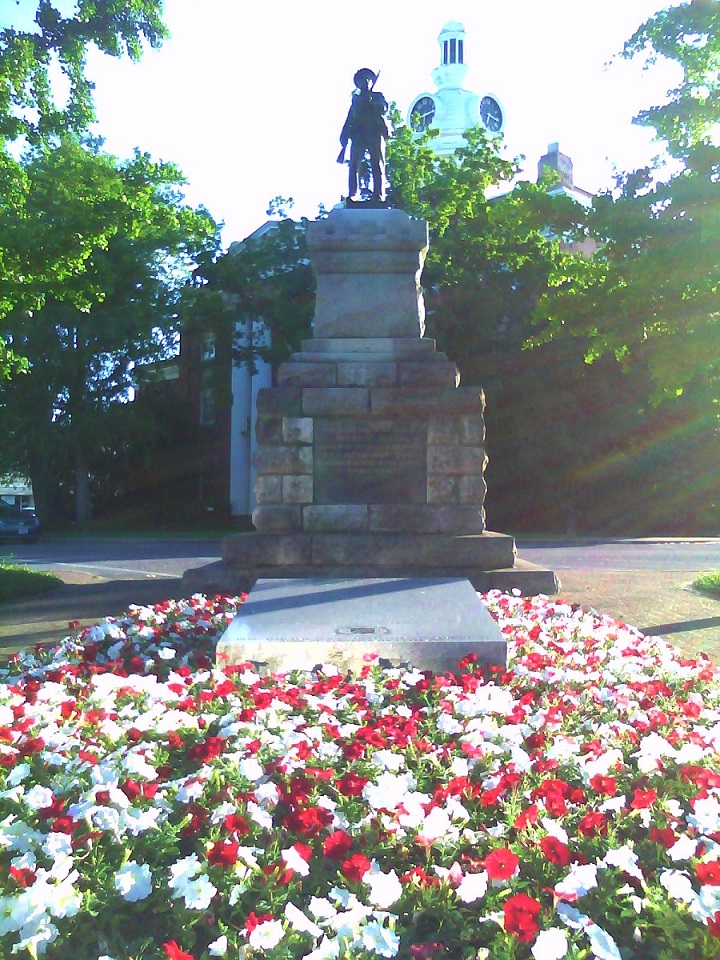
Rutherford County Courthouse in the background with the 1901 Confederate Soldier's Monument in the mid-ground, and the 2011 Army of Tennessee monument in the foreground.

In 1901, the Sons of Confederate Veterans along with the Ladies Memorial Association erected a monument to the Confederacy on the Courthouse lawn. On the west side of the Courthouse, in 1912, a tablet was erected by the Col. Hardy Murfree Chapter of the Daughters of the American Revolution to commemorate Murfreesboro's status as former state capitol. Another monument was erected, this time on the southwest lawn, in 1949 to further memorialize the city's status as former state capitol.

Additional monuments around the Courthouse include, a monument to Revolutionary War Gen. Griffith Rutherford, a monument dedicated to Rutherford County law enforcement officers killed in the line of duty since 1946, two plaques in memory to the memory of Forrest's Raid on Murfreesboro (July 13, 1862), a memorial to Veterans of Foreign Wars, a plaque in honor of those who served the Confederacy from Rutherford County, and a monument erected in 2011 by the Sons of Confederate Veterans Camp #33 dedicated to those from Rutherford County who served in the Army of Tennessee.

== Gallery ==
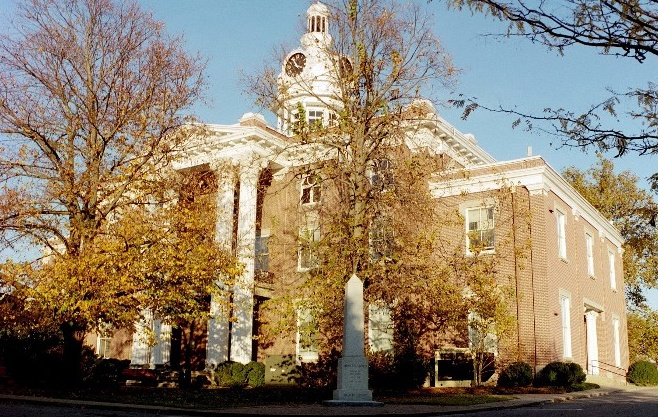

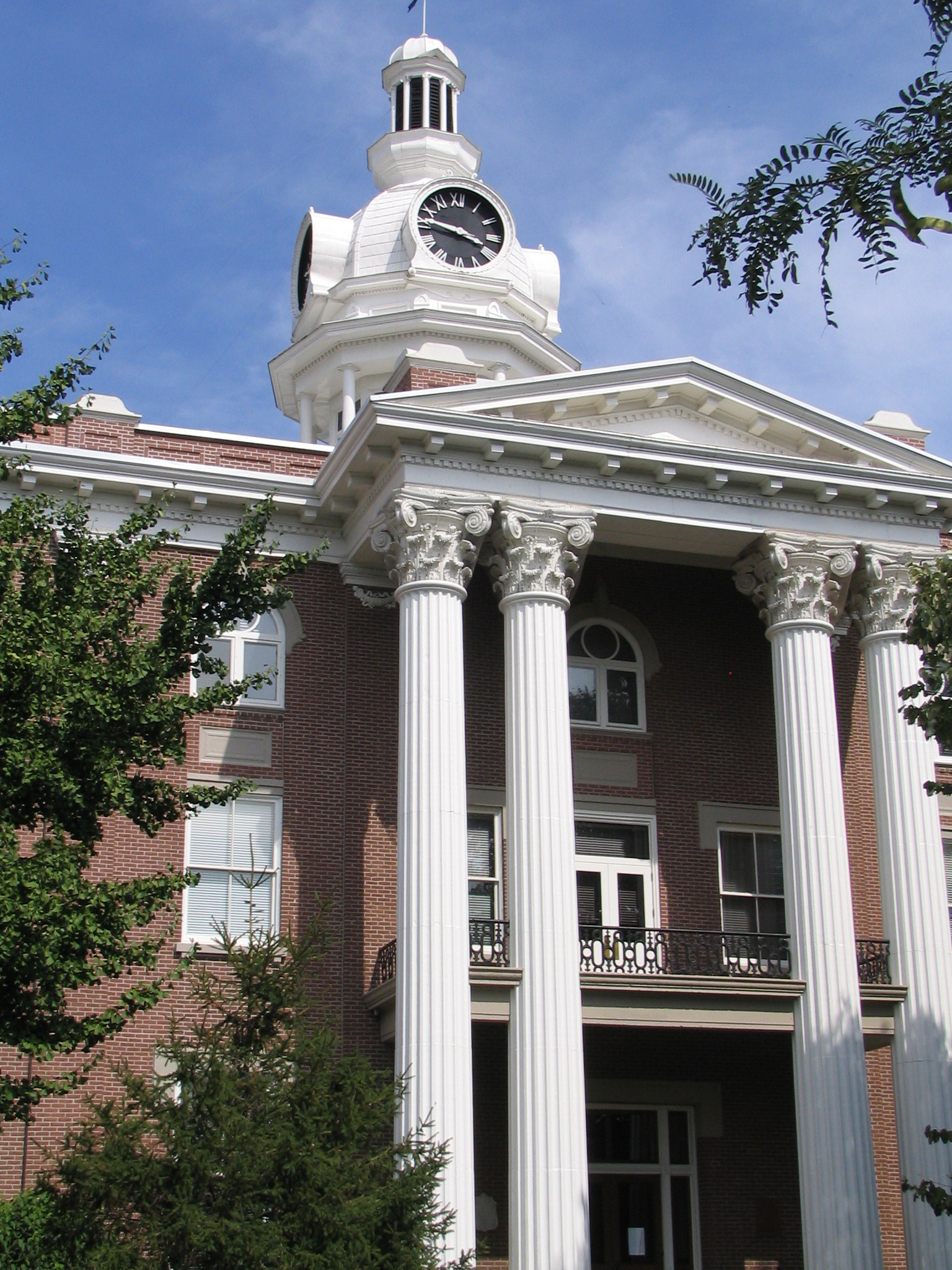
