= Clinton Gregory =

American singer-songwriter

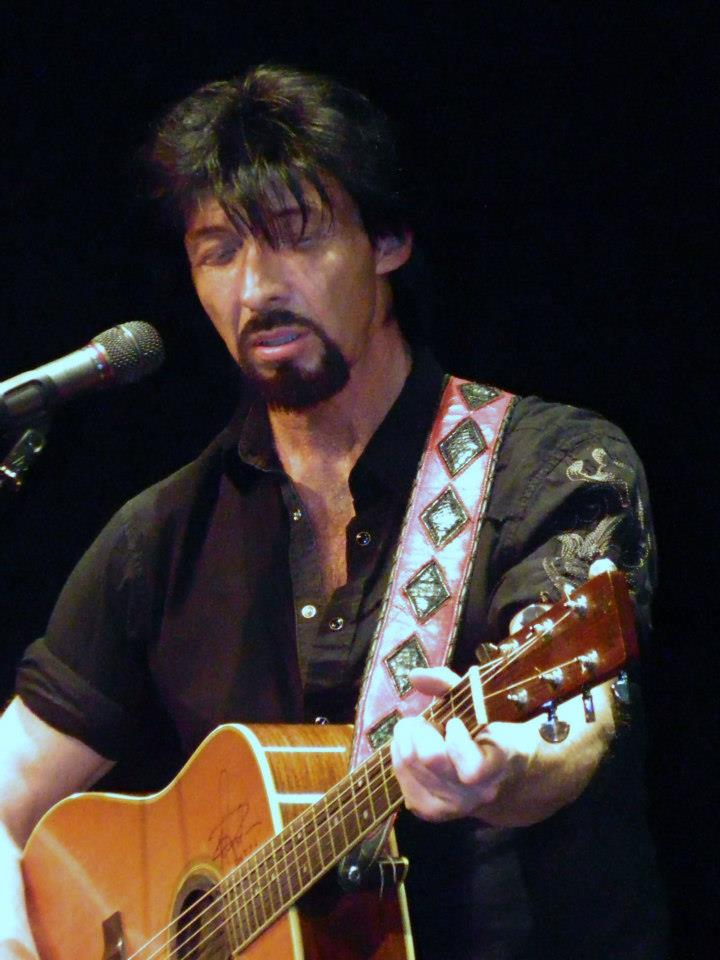
- Gregory performing in 2013

Background information
- Born: March 1, 1964 (age 62)
- Origin: Martinsville, Virginia, United States
- Genres: Country; Bluegrass
- Occupation: Singer-songwriter
- Instruments: Vocals, guitar, fiddle
- Years active: 1990–present
- Labels: Step One, Rock Bottom, Polydor
- Website: web.archive.org/web/20131030225512/http://questx.com/clintongregory/index.html

Clinton Gregory (born March 1, 1964) is an American country and bluegrass singer, songwriter, and fiddler. He has recorded primarily on independent labels, and has charted eleven singles on the Billboard Hot Country Singles & Tracks (now known as Hot Country Songs) charts. His highest charting single is "Play, Ruby, Play", which reached No. 25.

== Biography ==
Clinton Gregory began playing the fiddle at age five; by age six, he was performing at bluegrass festivals. At age twelve, he and his family moved to Nashville, Tennessee, where his father, Willie Gregory, performed on the Grand Ole Opry.

Gregory later became a session musician, playing fiddle for Suzy Bogguss and other acts. In 1990, he was signed to Step One Records. While on Step One, he recorded three albums and charted several singles on the U.S. Billboard Hot Country Songs charts, becoming the first independent act in over a decade to reach the Top 30 on the U.S. country charts. He also won the Music Row Industry's Independent Artist of the Year award for 1992 and 1993. He later recorded two albums for Rock Bottom Records and one for Polydor Records.

== Discography ==
=== Albums ===
Title	Album details
Music 'n Me	Release date: 1990; Label: Step One Records
(If It Weren't For Country Music) I'd Go Crazy	Release date: 1991; Label: Step One Records
Freeborn Man	Release date: December 1991; Label: Step One Records
Master of Illusion	Release date: June 21, 1993; Label: Step One Records
For Christmas	Release date: August 7, 1993; Label: Step One Records
Clinton Gregory	Release date: January 17, 1995; Label: Polydor Records
Play, Ruby, Play	Release date: July 28, 2000; Label: Step One Records
Too Much Ain't Enough	Release date: April 16, 2012; Label: Melody Roundup Music
Roots of My Raising	Release date: May 13, 2013; Label: Melody Roundup Music

=== Singles ===
Year	Single	Peak chart positions		Album
Year	Single	US Country	CAN Country	Album
1990	"Rockin' the Country"	—	—	—N/a
1990	"Nobody's Darlin'"	—	—	Music 'n Me
1990	"Made for Lovin' You"	—	—	Music 'n Me
1990	"She Put the Music in Me"	—	—	Music 'n Me
1991	"Couldn't Love Have Picked a Better Place to Die"	64	—	Music 'n Me
1991	"(If It Weren't for Country Music) I'd Go Crazy"	26	—	(If It Weren't For Country Music) I'd Go Crazy
1991	"One Shot at a Time"	51	51	(If It Weren't For Country Music) I'd Go Crazy
1991	"Satisfy Me and I'll Satisfy You"	53	41	(If It Weren't For Country Music) I'd Go Crazy
1992	"Play, Ruby, Play"	25	20	Freeborn Man
1992	"She Takes the Sad Out of Saturday Night"	50	74	Freeborn Man
1992	"Who Needs It"	29	39	Freeborn Man
1993	"Look Who's Needin' Who"	65	—	Freeborn Man
1993	"Standing on the Edge of Love"	52	—	Master of Illusion
1993	"Master of Illusion"	59	—	Master of Illusion
1994	"The Gulf and the Shell"	—	—	Clinton Gregory
1995	"You Didn't Miss a Thing"	68	85	Clinton Gregory
1995	"A-11"	—	—	Clinton Gregory
1995	"Christmas in Virginia"	—	—	For Christmas
2012	"She Did"	—	—	Too Much Ain't Enough
2013	"Too Much Ain't Enough"	—	—	Too Much Ain't Enough
2013	"You Smile"	—	—	Too Much Ain't Enough
2014	"Some Real Good People" (with Collin Raye)	—	—	—N/a
2014	"You Can't Hide High" (with Ira Dean)	—	—	—N/a
"—" denotes releases that did not chart

=== Music videos ===
Year	Video	Director
1990	"Couldn't Love Have Picked a Better Place to Die"	—N/a
1991	"(If It Weren't for Country Music) I'd Go Crazy"	Kenny Kiper
1991	"One Shot at a Time"	—N/a
1992	"Play, Ruby, Play"	Stan Moore
1992	"Who Needs It"	Greg Crutcher
1993	"Look Who's Needin' Who"	Greg Crutcher
1993	"Standing on the Edge of Love"	Greg Crutcher
1993	"Master of Illusion"	Greg Crutcher
1994	"The Gulf and the Shell"	Bill Young
1995	"You Didn't Miss a Thing"	Bill Young/Jim Barham
1995	"A-11"	—N/a
2006	"Writing on the Wall"	Peter Lippman
2012	"She Did"	P. J. Schenkel
2013	"Too Much Ain't Enough"	Brett Bortle
