= Brice Taylor =

American football player and coach (1902-1974)

- Taylor at USC, c. 1925

Biographical details
- Born: July 4, 1902; Seattle, Washington, U.S.
- Died: September 18, 1974 (aged 72); Downey, California, U.S.

Playing career
- 1924–1926: USC
- Positions: Fullback, guard

Coaching career (HC unless noted)
- 1927: Claflin
- 1928–1931: Southern
- 1932–1933: Claflin
- 1934–1935: Bishop
- 1936–1938: Samuel Huston

Accomplishments and honors

Championships
- 1 GCAA) (1931); 1 SAAC} (1933)

Awards
- First-team All-American (1925); 2× First-team All-PCC (1925, 1926); Second-team All-PCC (1924); USC Athletic Hall of Fame

Brice Union Taylor (July 4, 1902 – September 18, 1974) was an American football player, coach and track athlete. He played college football as a guard at the University of Southern California (USC), where he was the first All-American in football at the university in 1925 and the first African-American player for the USC Trojans. Mr. Taylor served as the head football coach at Claflin University in Orangeburg, South Carolina in 1927 and from 1932 to 1933, Southern University in Baton Rouge, Louisiana from 1928 to 1931, Bishop College in Marshall, Texas from 1934 to 1935, and Samuel Huston College in Austin, Texas from 1936 to 1938.

== Early years ==
Brice Union Taylor was born on July 4, 1902, in Seattle, Washington. His middle name of "Union" was given in honor of his birth falling on Independence Day. Taylor was a descendant of both African slaves and the Shawnee Indian chief Tecumseh. He was the youngest of ten children of Cyrus Taylor, a bricklayer. Orphaned at age 5, due to a fire in the family home, Taylor was taken in and raised by the DiJulio family of Seattle. Although he was born without a left hand, Taylor showed his athletic prowess while growing up in Seattle, Washington and played football at Franklin High School.

== College career ==
Taylor enrolled at the University of Southern California, where he became a member of the Omega fraternity and remained an active member throughout his life.

=== Football ===
Taylor played for the USC Trojans football team. He started as a fullback on Gus Henderson's 1924 Trojan team. In 1925, Howard Jones became the new head football coach and moved Taylor to offensive and defensive line and kicker. Taylor played all but four minutes of USC's eleven games that season, a school record that stood for decades. Taylor was also named USC’s first All American football player in 1925.

=== Track ===
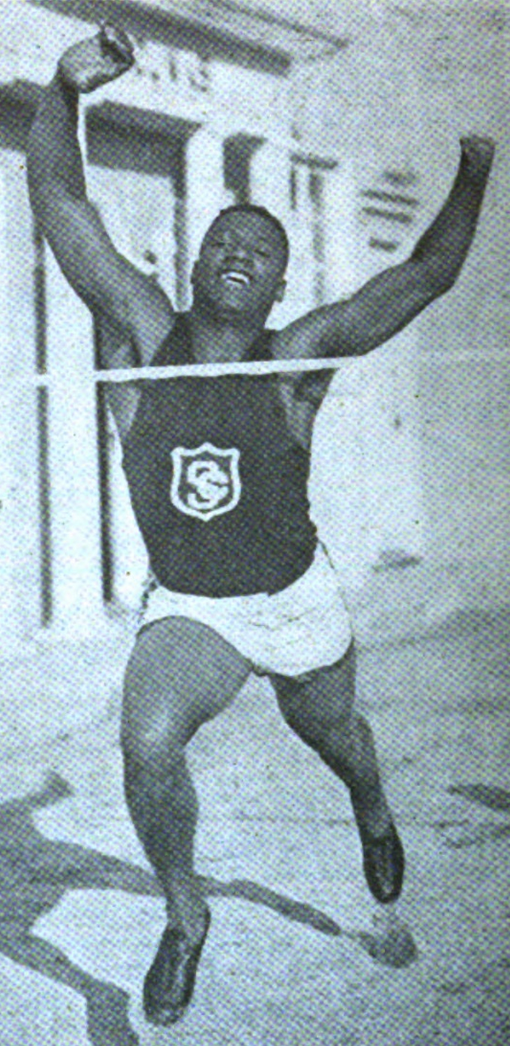
Brice Taylor, in the June 1925 issue of The Crisis; with USC insignia on the chest of his jersey.

Taylor was also a sprinter, hurdler and relay runner on the USC track team that won the IC4A meet at the University of Pennsylvania. He won the 100-yard dash with a 9.8 time, won the 220-yard high-hurdles and was the lead runner on the mile relay team that broke the world record that day. He was also selected for the US Olympic relay team for the Olympics held in Paris in 1924 but due to a sprained ankle, he was not able to compete.

== Professional career ==
In June 1927, Taylor was hired as the head athletic coach at Claflin University in Orangeburg, South Carolina. The following year, he was appointed as head athletic coach at Southern University in Baton Rouge, Louisiana. He served as head coach for the Southern Jaguars football team from 1928 to 1931. There he began what would become the Bayou Classic against rival Grambling State University. He led the Jaguars to their first undefeated season in 1931. Taylor returned to Claflin in 1932. From 1936 to 1939, Taylor coached both football and basketball at Samuel Huston College, which later merged with Tillotson College to form Huston–Tillotson University in Austin, Texas.

Taylor later became a high school football coach and teacher at Jefferson High School in Los Angeles, California and an associate pastor at the First African Methodist Episcopal Church of Los Angeles. While a football coach at Jefferson High School, he began a weekend program for students at the high school by opening the gym on Saturdays as well as hosting Sports Nights during the week, offering an opportunity for students to participate in sports activities and games while keeping them off the streets in Central Los Angeles. Besides coaching football, Mr. Taylor also taught tennis and gymnastics.

In 1969, Governor Ronald Reagan appointed him to be the Director of Head Start within the Office of Economic Opportunity (OEO) in California.

== Death and honors ==
Brice Taylor died on September 18, 1974, in Los Angeles, after having a stroke two weeks prior. He was survived by his wife, Dora Jones Taylor and their three children; two sons, Cryus and Henry, and a daughter, Dora Ada.

Mr. Taylor was honored as Teacher of the Year by the City of Los Angeles in 1969 and received the University of Southern California General Alumni Association Service award in 1970.

Los Angeles Mayor Sam Yorty appointed Brice Taylor to the Mayor's Community Advisory Board in 1964.

Taylor was inducted into the USC Athletic Hall of Fame in 1995. There is a plaque honoring him as the first All-American at the Los Angeles Coliseum in the Memorial Court of Honor. Every year, the Brice Taylor Award is given to a USC alumnus for outstanding civic service in their community.

== Head coaching record ==
Year	Team	Overall	Conference	Standing	Bowl/playoffs
Claflin Panthers (Georgia-Carolina Intercollegiate Athletic Association) (1927)
1927	Claflin	4–2–2			
Southern Cats/Bushmen (Gulf Coast Athletic Association) (1928–1931)
1928	Southern	5–2–1			
1929	Southern	7–1			
1930	Southern	5–1–1			
1931	Southern	7–0	3–0	1st	
Southern:		24–4–2			
Claflin Panthers (South Atlantic Athletic Conference) (1932–1933)
1932	Claflin	2–5–1		1st	
1933	Claflin	2–3		1st	
Claflin:		8–10–3			
Bishop Tigers (Southwestern Athletic Conference) (1934–1935)
1934	Bishop	6–0–1	0–0	NA	
1935	Bishop	7–2–1	3–2–1	3rd	
Samuel Huston Dragons () (1936–1938)
1936	Samuel Huston				
1937	Samuel Huston				
1938	Samuel Huston				
Samuel Huston:					
Total:					
National championship Conference title Conference division title or championship game berth
