= Duke Nelson =

American sports coach and administrator (1907–1989)

Biographical details
- Born: April 26, 1907; Boston, Massachusetts, U.S.
- Died: October 22, 1989 (aged 82); Middlebury, Vermont, U.S.
- Education: Middlebury College

Coaching career (HC unless noted)

Football
- 1938: Union (NY) (line)
- 1939–1941: RPI
- 1946–1968: Middlebury

Baseball
- 1933–1936: Middlebury
- 1937–1938: Union (NY)

Men's ice hockey
- 1932–1936: Middlebury
- 1936–1939: Union (NY)
- 1946–1964: Middlebury

Women's ice hockey
- 1981–1983: Middlebury (W)

Lacrosse
- 1954–1968: Middlebury

Administrative career (AD unless noted)
- 1946–1956: Middlebury (assistant AD)
- 1956–1969: Middlebury

Head coaching record
- Overall: 98–81–12 (football); 211–177–7 (men's ice hockey); 14–14–1 (women's ice hockey); 9–26–1 (lacrosse)

Accomplishments and honors

Championships
- Football; 2 Vermont State Conference (1948–1949)

Walter John "Duke" Nelson (April 26, 1907 – October 22, 1989) was an American college athletics coach and administrator. He was the head American football coach at Rensselaer Polytechnic Institute (RPI) from 1939 to 1941 and at Middlebury College from 1946 to 1968 compiling a career college football coaching record of 98–81–12. At Middlebury, he teams won back-to-back Vermont State Conference championships in 1948 and 1949. Nelson graduated from Middlebury in 1932.

== Head coaching record ==
=== Football ===
Year	Team	Overall	Conference	Standing	Bowl/playoffs
RPI Engineers (Independent) (1939–1941)
1939	RPI	4–2–1			
1940	RPI	7–1			
1941	RPI	4–3			
RPI:		15–6–2			
Middlebury Panthers (Independent) (1946–1947)
1946	Middlebury	2–4–1			
1947	Middlebury	6–1–1			
Middlebury Panthers (Vermont State Conference) (1948–1950)
1948	Middlebury	7–1		T–1st	
1949	Middlebury	4–2–1		1st	
1950	Middlebury	3–4–1			
Middlebury Panthers (NCAA College Division independent) (1951–1962)
1951	Middlebury	4–4			
1952	Middlebury	2–5			
1953	Middlebury	2–5			
1954	Middlebury	4–2–1			
1955	Middlebury	3–4			
1956	Middlebury	4–3			
1957	Middlebury	5–2			
1958	Middlebury	4–3			
1959	Middlebury	5–1–1			
1960	Middlebury	5–1–1			
1961	Middlebury	5–1–1			
1962	Middlebury	5–2			
Middlebury Panthers (Green Mountain Conference) (1963)
1963	Middlebury	2–5			
Middlebury Panthers (NCAA College Division independent) (1964–1968)
1964	Middlebury	3–3–1			
1965	Middlebury	2–5			
1966	Middlebury	3–5			
1967	Middlebury	2–6			
1968	Middlebury	1–6–1			
Middlebury:		83–75–10			
Total:		98–81–12			
National championship Conference title Conference division title or championship game berth
