= Virginia / North Carolina Athletic Conference =

College sports conference, 1920–1922

The Virginia / North Carolina Athletic Conference was a short-lived intercollegiate athletic conference that existed from 1920 to 1922. As its name suggests, the league's members were located in the states of North Carolina and Virginia. It is unknown which teams won its football championship during its three seasons in existence.

== See also ==
- List of defunct college football conferences
