= Football Conference (disambiguation) =

Football Conference was the name of the English National League between 1986 and 2015.

Football conference may also refer to:

- American Football Conference (AFC), of the professional National Football League (NFL) in the United States
- National Football Conference (NFC), of the professional National Football League (NFL) in the United States
- All-America Football Conference, a now defunct professional American football league in operation from 1946 to 1949

== See also ==
- List of college athletic conferences in the United States, sponsored by the NCAA (Division I, Division II, or Division III), NAIA, or other governing bodies
- List of defunct college football conferences, formerly competing in American football in the NCAA or other governing bodies
