= John Chiapuzio =

American football, wrestling, and baseball coach

Biographical details
- Born: April 3, 1925
- Died: September 20, 1988 (aged 63)
- Education: Oregon

Coaching career (HC unless noted)

Football
- 1969–1972: Concordia (MN)

Wrestling
- 1953–1965: North Bend HS (OR)
- 1965–1973: Concordia (MN)
- 1973–1986: Sheldon HS (OR)

Baseball
- 1966–1969: Concordia (MN)
- 1971: Concordia (MN)
- 1973: Concordia (MN)

Head coaching record
- Overall: 18–15 (football); 28–23 (baseball)

Accomplishments and honors

Championships
- Baseball; 1 Twin River

Awards
- Concordia (MN) Hall of Fame (1998); North Bend HS (OR) Hall of Fame (2011)

Jim Paul Chiapuzio (April 3, 1925 – September 20, 1988) was an American football, wrestling, and baseball coach. He served as the head football coach at Concordia University in Saint Paul, Minnesota from 1969 to 1972, where he was the first coach in that program's history, completing a record of 18–15. He also served as the wrestling and baseball coach at Concordia, earning a 28–23 in baseball with one Twin River Collegiate Conference championship.

Chiapuzio also began the wrestling program at North Bend High School in North Bend, Oregon in 1953, where he served until moving to Concordia in 1965. He finished his career at Sheldon High School in Eugene, Oregon, retiring in 1986.

== Head coaching record ==
=== College football ===
| Year | Team | Overall | Conference | Standing | Bowl/playoffs |
|---|---|---|---|---|---|
Concordia Golden Bears (NAIA Division II independent) (1969–1971)
| 1969 | Concordia | 4–4 | | | |
| 1970 | Concordia | 6–2 | | | |
| 1971 | Concordia | 4–5 | | | |
Concordia Golden Bears (Tri-State Conference) (1972)
| 1972 | Concordia | 4–4 | 2–3 | T–3rd | |
| Concordia: | | 18–15 | 2–3 | | |
| Total: | | 18–15 | | | |
