= Little Five Conference =

College sports conference in Illinois, 1912–1917

The Little Five Conference was a short-lived intercollegiate athletic football conference that existed from 1912 to 1917. The league had members in the state of Illinois.

== Champions ==
- 1912 – Lake Forest
- 1913 – Lake Forest
- 1914 – Monmouth (IL)
- 1915 – Monmouth (IL)
- 1916 – Monmouth (IL)
- 1917 – Monmouth (IL)

== See also ==
- List of defunct college football conferences
- Illinois Intercollegiate Athletic Conference
