= 1931 Southern Bushmen football team =

American college football season

1931 Southern Bushmen football

GCAA champion
- Conference: Gulf Coast Athletic Association
- Record: 7–0 (3–0 GCAA)
- Head coach: Brice Taylor (4th season)

The 1931 Southern Bushmen football team represented Southern University as a member of the Gulf Coast Athletic Association (GCAA) during the 1931 college football season. Led by Brice Taylor in his fourth season as head coach, the Bushmen compiled a perfect overall record of 7–0, winning the GCAA title.

Prior to the season, Southern University changed its nickname from "Cats" to "Bushmen".

== Schedule ==
Date	Opponent	Site	Result	Attendance	Source
September 26	Campbell (MS)*	Baton Rouge, LA	W 91–0	1,500	
October 10	at Bishop*	Marshall, TX	W 6–0		
October 17	Texas College*	Baton Rouge, LA	W 38–6		
October 26	vs. Wiley*	State Fair Stadium; Shreveport, LA	W 14–7		
November 7	at New Orleans	Xavier Stadium; New Orleans, LA	W 32–0		
November 14	Straight	Baton Rouge, LA	W 51–0	3,000	
November 21	Leland	Baton Rouge, LA	W 82–0		
*Non-conference game
