= South Atlantic Athletic Conference =

College sports conference of historically Black colleges and universities

The South Atlantic Athletic Conference (SAAC) was an intercollegiate athletic conference of historically black colleges and universities (HBCUs). Founded around 1913, the conference changed its name from the Georgia-Carolina Intercollegiate Athletic Association to the South Atlantic Intercollegiate Athletic Association (SAIAA) in 1928. It was also known as the South Atlantic Athletic Association (SAAA) and the South Atlantic Conference. The conference's members were located in Georgia, North Carolina, South Carolina, and Tennessee.

At the conference's annual meeting on December 21, 1935, held at Orangeburg, South Carolina, two new members were admitted: Livingstone College of Salisbury, North Carolina and Morristown College on Morristown, Tennessee. At that meeting, South Carolina State College formally withdrew from the conference. In January 1940, Allen University, Georgia State College, Morris College, and Paine College left the conference and joined Fort Valley State College to form the Southeastern Athletic Association—later known as the Southeastern Athletic Conference (SEAC).

== Member schools ==
Institution	Location	Founded	Affiliation	Nickname	Joined	Left	Current conference
Allen University	Columbia, South Carolina	1870	AME Church	Yellow Jackets		1940	Southern (SIAC) (Note: Currently an NCAA Division II athletic conference.)
Benedict College	Columbia, South Carolina	1870	Baptist	Tigers		early 1930s	Southern (SIAC)
Bettis Academy and Junior College	Trenton, South Carolina	1881					Closed in 1952
Claflin University	Orangeburg, South Carolina	1869	United Methodist	Panthers			CIAA
Clinton College	Rock Hill, South Carolina	1894	AME Zion Church	Golden Bears			
Coulter Memorial Academy	Cheraw, South Carolina	1881	Presbyterian				Closed in 1949
Friendship College	Rock Hill, South Carolina	1891	Baptist	Tigers			Closed in 1949
Georgia State College	Savannah, Georgia	1890	Public	Tigers		1940	Southern (SIAC)
Haines Normal and Industrial Institute	Augusta, Georgia	1886	Presbyterian	Tigers			Closed in 1946
Harbison College	Irmo, South Carolina	1901	United Presbyterian	Panthers			Closed in 1958
Livingstone College	Salisbury, North Carolina	1879	AME Zion Church	Blue Bears	1935		CIAA
Morris College	Sumter, South Carolina	1908	Baptist	Hornets		1940	Continental (Note: Currently an NAIA athletic conference.)
Morristown College	Morristown, Tennessee	1881	Methodist Episcopal	Red Knights	1935		Closed in 1994
Paine College	Augusta, Georgia	1882	United Methodist	Lions		1940	NCCAA South
Schofield Institute	Aiken, South Carolina	1866	Public				Closed in 1960s
Seneca Junior College	Seneca, South Carolina	1899	Baptist				Closed in 1939
South Carolina State College	Orangeburg, South Carolina	1896	Public	Bulldogs		1935	Mid-Eastern (MEAC) (Note: Currently an NCAA Division I athletic conference.)
Swift Memorial College	Rogersville, Tennessee	1883	Presbyterian	Bulldogs	1936		Closed in 1952
Voorhees Industrial Institute	Denmark, South Carolina	1897	Episcopal	Tigers			HBCU

== Football champions ==
- 1924: Benedict
- 1925: Benedict
- 1928: South Carolina State
- 1929: Claflin
- 1930: South Carolina State
- 1931: South Carolina State
- 1932: Benedict and Paine
- 1933: Claflin
- 1934: Claflin
- 1935: Claflin
- 1936: Allen
- 1937: Allen
- 1938: Georgia State
- 1939: Allen
- 1942: Voorhees
- 1945: Morristown
- 1946: Morristown
- 1947: Swift
- 1949: Voorhees
- 1950: Voorhees
- 1951: Voorhees

== See also ==
- List of defunct college football conferences
