= Badger-Gopher Conference =

The Badger-Gopher Conference was a short-lived college athletics conference composed of member schools located in the states of Minnesota and Wisconsin. The league existed from 1958 to 1962.

== Football champions ==
- 1958 – Bethel (MN)
- 1959 – Lakeland and Northland
- 1960 – Lakeland
- 1961 – Lakeland

== See also ==
- List of defunct college football conferences
