= Illinois Intercollege Conference =

College sports conference in Illinois, 1938–1942

The Illinois Intercollege Conference was a short-lived intercollegiate athletic football conference that existed between 1938 and 1942. The league had members, as its name suggests, in the state of Illinois.

== Champions ==
- 1938 – Bradley and Lake Forest
- 1939 – Illinois Wesleyan
- 1940 – Illinois Wesleyan, Lake Forest, and Millikin
- 1941 – Millikin
- 1942 – Millikin

== See also ==
- List of defunct college football conferences
