= William Henderson Franklin =

Rev. William Henderson Franklin
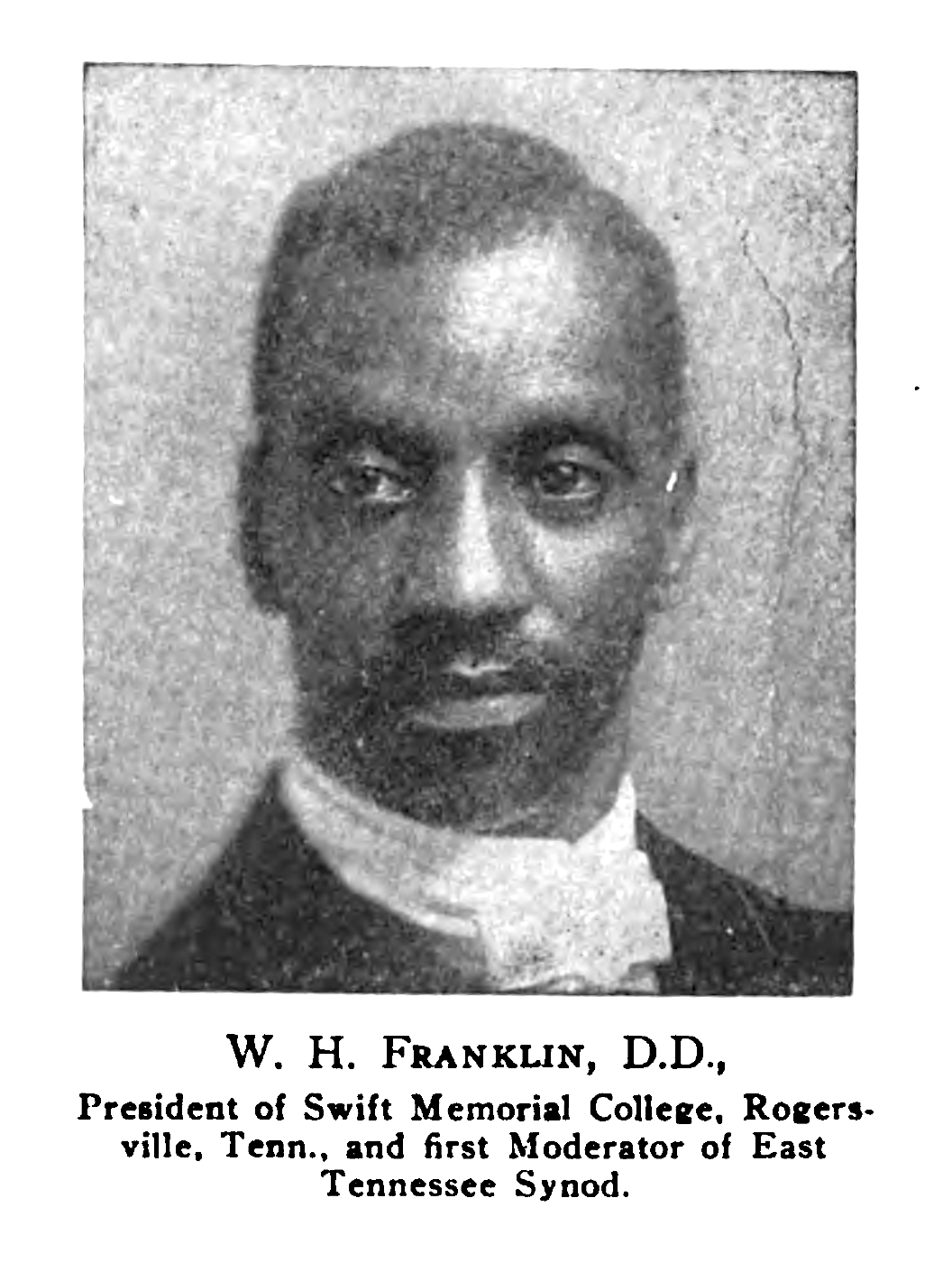

1st Principal of Swift Memorial College
- In office 1883 – May 1926

Personal details
- Born: April 14, 1852 Knoxville, Tennessee, United States
- Died: October 19, 1935 (aged 83) United States
- Spouse: Laura Crofton (m. 1894–1935; his death)
- Education: Maryville College (AM), Lane Theological Seminary (DD)
- Occupation: Educator, minister, journalist, school founder, academic administrator

Rev. William Henderson Franklin (1852–1935) was an American educator, minister, journalist, and school founder. Franklin dedicated his life to the education of Black children in rural Tennessee during the time of racial segregation. He founded Swift Memorial College in 1883, and served as the principal until 1926. He was the first minister the congregation at St. Marks Presbyterian Church in Rogersville, Tennessee. He was also known as W.H. Franklin.

== Early life and education ==
William Henderson Franklin was born on April 14, 1852, in Knoxville, Tennessee, to free Black parents Elizabeth (née Bates) and Henderson Franklin. He attended schools in Knoxville, before heading to Hudsonville, Mississippi to earn money teaching.

Franklin attended Maryville College in Maryville, Tennessee, and was the first African American to graduate with a A.M. degree in 1880. He continued his studies at Lane Theological Seminary in Walnut Hills, Ohio, and graduated with a D.D. degree in 1883.

== Career ==
Franklin was the minister of the congregation of St. Marks Presbyterian Church in Rogersville, Tennessee, where he served from 1883 until his retirement in 1926.

Franklin was ordained by the Union Presbytery Synod of Tennessee shortly after graduating from Lane. In 1883, Franklin founded the Swift Memorial Institute (later known as Swift Memorial College) in Rogersville, Tennessee, with financial help from Maryville College. He acted as the principal from the time of the school's opening until 1926.

He was also a journalist, and regularly wrote for The Tennessee Star, The Herald Presbytery, and The Critic. Additionally he acted as a correspondent for The New York Age, and the Negro World.

== Death and legacy ==
Franklin died on October 19, 1935. He is buried at Saint Mark's Presbyterian Cemetery in Rogersville.

A profile of him is included in the books The Afro-American Press and Its Editors (1891), and An Encyclopedia: Experiences of Black People in Knoxville, Tennessee, 1844–1974 (2017) by Robert J. Booker. The Tennessee Independent Colleges and Universities Association (TICUA) placed Franklin in the Hall of Fame in 2020. The town of Rogersville has a historical marker in his honor on West Kyle Street.
