= Gulf Coast Athletic Association =

College sports conference of historically Black colleges and universities

The Gulf Coast Athletic Association (GCAA), also called the Gulf Coast Intercollegiate Athletic Association and the Gulf Coast Intercollegiate Athletic Conference, was an intercollegiate athletic conference of historically black colleges and universities (HBCUs) that was founded in 1926. The conference's members were located in the Gulf Coast of the United States in the states of Louisiana and Mississippi.

The conference's constitution was drafted in 1926. Representatives of the conference met on November 30, 1927, at New Orleans University in New Orleans. The GCAA's membership at the time consisted of six schools: Alcorn Agricultural and Mechanical College (now known as Alcorn State University) of Lorman, Mississippi, Leland College of New Orleans, New Orleans University, Southern University of Baton Rouge, Louisiana, Straight College of New Orleans, and Xavier University of Louisiana, also located in New Orleans.

== Football champions ==
- 1927: New Orleans
- 1928: Alcorn A&M
- 1929: no champion
- 1931: Southern

== See also ==
- List of defunct college football conferences
