= St. Marks Presbyterian Church (Rogersville, Tennessee) =

Historic church in Tennessee, United States

- U.S. National Register of Historic Places
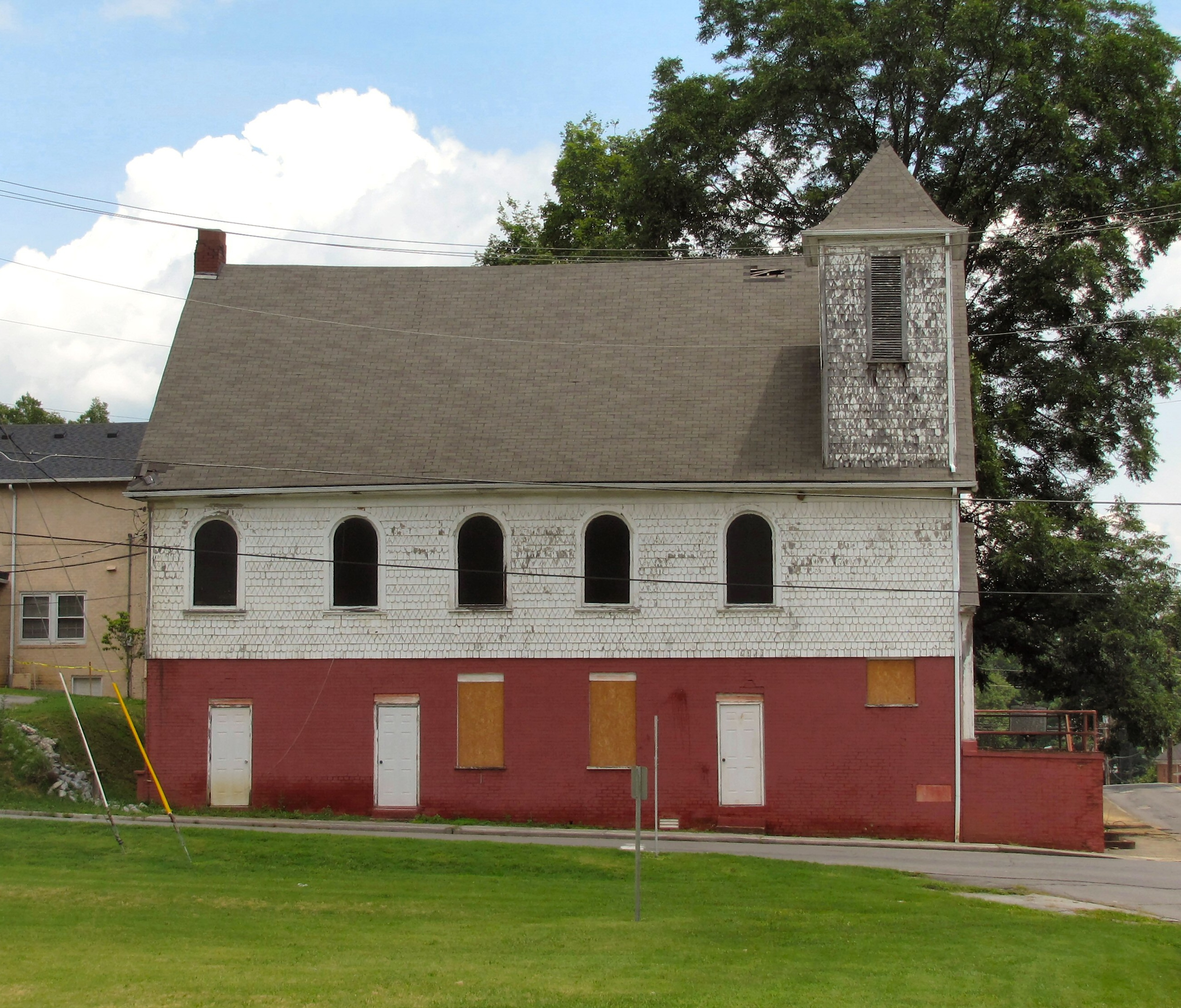

- Location within Tennessee Location within the United States
- Location: Jct. of N. Hassen and W. Kyle Sts., Rogersville, Tennessee, U.S.
- Coordinates: 36°24′34″N 83°0′29″W
- Area: less than one acre
- Built: 1912
- Architectural style: Shingle Style
- MPS: Rural African-American Churches in Tennessee MPS
- NRHP reference No.: 06000132
- Added to NRHP: March 10, 2006

St. Marks Presbyterian Church is a historic African-American Presbyterian church in Rogersville, Tennessee. Its building was added to the list of National Register of Historic Places in March 10, 2006.

== History ==
The congregation was established in about 1875. Rev. William Henderson Franklin was its first minister, serving from 1883 until 1926. Franklin was also the founding president of Swift Memorial Junior College in Rogersville, with which the church was closely associated. Swift students and faculty were required to attend worship at St. Marks twice each week.

The church building is located at the junction of N. Hassen and W. Kyle Streets in Rogersville. The site was purchased some time after 1885 for the campus of Swift Memorial Junior College. The church was built in 1912. It is a wood-frame building on a brick foundation with decorative patterned wood shingles, a characteristic of Shingle Style architecture. It has a high peaked roof with a tower on one side of the roof peak. Stained-glass windows are a prominent feature of the sanctuary. There are two front entrances to the building; the western door was originally for women and the eastern door was for men. Men and women formerly sat separately during services.

Swift Memorial College closed in 1955 due to financial problems. St. Marks Church and other properties associated with college were sold to Hawkins County the following year, but the St. Marks congregation was permitted to continue using the church building. A day care center operated in the church basement between 1973 and 1979.

With dwindling membership, the St. Marks congregation stopped holding regular worship services in 2000 and dissolved in 2002. Its building was added to the National Register of Historic Places in 2006 for its importance to the local African-American community and as a "fine example of 20th-century Shingle Style architecture". The Rogersville Historic District, which the church property abuts, does not include any buildings in the Shingle Style; this architectural style is uncommon in East Tennessee.

== See also ==
- Price Public Elementary School
