= Price Public Elementary School =

- U.S. National Register of Historic Places
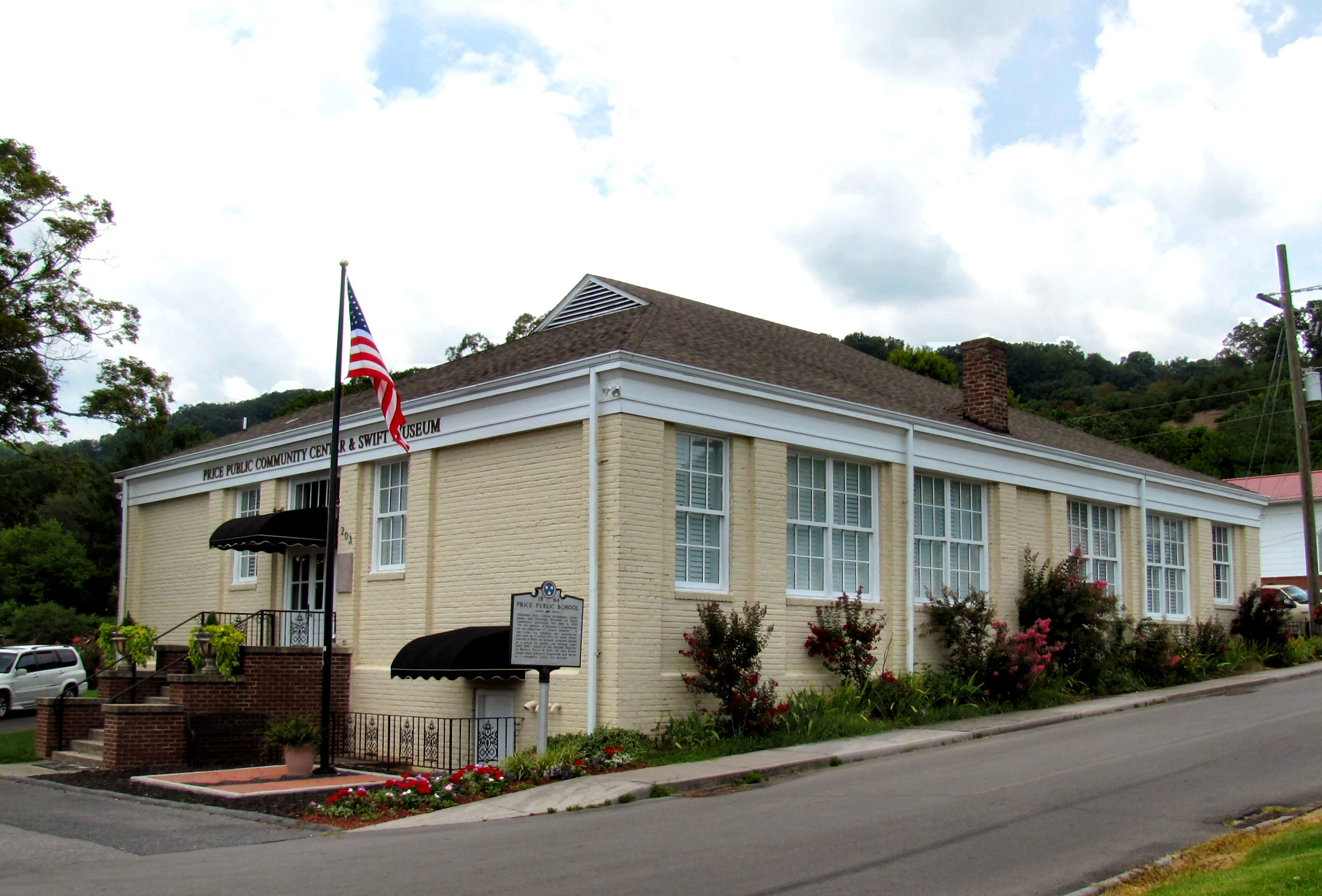

- Location within Tennessee Location within the United States
- Location: Hasson and Spring Sts., Rogersville, Tennessee
- Coordinates: 36°24′34″N 83°0′32″W
- Area: less than one acre
- Built: 1923
- NRHP reference No.: 88002538
- Added to NRHP: November 10, 1988

Price Public Elementary School, now known as Price Public Community Center and Swift Museum, is a former African-American school in Rogersville, Tennessee. It currently serves as a community center and home of the Swift Museum. The school was listed on the National Register of Historic Places in 1988.

== History ==
The site of the school was dedicated to African-American education in 1868, when Alexander Fain, Jordan Netherland, Albert Jones and Nathaniel Mitchell bought the land "for the purpose of building a schoolhouse for the education of colored children." A schoolhouse was built and used until the early 1900s. The current building replaced it in 1922. Price Public Elementary School was considered a feeder school to Swift Memorial College (1883–1952), a private HBCU in Rogersville.

Price School operated until 1958, when it closed and its students were transferred to Swift High School, which was converted from a high school to a grade K-12 school. When integration took place in Rogersville, during the 1960s, the city's African-American elementary school students were transferred to Rogersville City School, also a K-8 institution. The Price School building was subsequently used as a cannery, a community center, and a storage building, then was abandoned and became run-down.

The building underwent a restoration beginning in the mid-1990s as a result of cooperative efforts between the town, the local African-American community, the local American Legion Auxiliary, the Chamber of Commerce, the Rogersville Heritage Association, and other civic organizations. The project was aided by a rural development grant from the U.S. Department of Agriculture. Following restoration, in 2003 the Price Public Community Center opened in the building.

The Swift Museum in the center opened to the public in 2008. The community center and museum offer resources for learning and teaching about African-American history and culture.

== See also ==
- St. Marks Presbyterian Church (Rogersville, Tennessee)
