= Merl R. Eppse =

American historian (1893–1967)

Merl Raymond Eppse
- Born: 1893; Greenville, Ohio, U.S.
- Died: December 27, 1967 (aged 73–74); Los Angeles, California, U.S.
- Education: Drake University (BA); Teachers College, Columbia University (MA)
- Occupation: Historian
- Employer: Tennessee State University
- Spouse: Ruth D. Clemmons

Merl Raymond Eppse (1893 – December 27, 1967) was an American historian, and a pioneer of Black studies. He was a history professor at Tennessee State University for three decades, and the author of several books.

== Early life ==
Merl Raymond Eppse was born in 1893 in Greenville, Ohio. He was Black, and the son of Henrietta and Hiram R. Eppse. Eppse attended public schools in Greenville, Ohio and graduated from the Palestine High School in Palestine, Ohio.

He graduated from Drake University in 1927, where he earned a Bachelor of Arts degree in history. Eppse earned a master's degree from the Teachers College, Columbia University in 1935.

== Career ==
Eppse was the dean of Swift Memorial College in Rogersville, Tennessee from 1927 to 1928. In 1928, he became a professor of history and geography at Tennessee State University. He later became the department chair. Eppse was the president of the Tennessee Negro Education Association from 1948 to 1949, and he was awarded an honorary doctorate of laws from Wilberforce University in 1953. He retired from TSU in 1960.

Eppse founded the National Publication Company in Nashville, Tennessee, to publish his books. He was one of the first educators to write an American history textbook that included the history of African Americans.

== Personal life, death and legacy ==
Eppse married Ruth D. Clemmons. He moved to Los Angeles for his retirement in 1962.

Eppse died on December 27, 1967, in Los Angeles, California. Penn State professor Murry R. Nelson presented a paper on Eppse in 1988. The Tennessee State Library and Archives has a collection of his papers.

== Selected works ==
- Eppse, Merl R. (1937). A Guide to the Study of the Negro in American History. Nashville, Tennessee: National education publishing co. OCLC 31562998.
- Eppse, Merl R. (1938). The Negro, Too, in American History. Chicago: National Educational Pub. Co. OCLC 17020487.
- Eppse, Merl R. (1953). An Elementary History of America: Including the Contributions of the Negro Race. Nashville, Tennessee: National Publication Co. OCLC 7588467.
