= Murry R. Nelson =

American historian

Murry R. Nelson (born May 12, 1947) is an emeritus professor of education and American studies at Penn State University and an author. He has written about the history of American sports, basketball in particular, as well as books on America's school curriculums. He has written biographies of several basketball players.

He graduated from Grinnell College with an A.B., Northwestern University with a master's in Teaching, Stanford University with a master's in Anthropology and a Ph.D.

Murry was awarded several Fulbright Scholarships. He wrote about the Big Ten Conference. A review of his book Children and Social Studies applauded it for promoting "ethnic literacy".

== Bibliography ==
- The Rolling Stones: A Musical Biography, ABC-CLIO, 2010.
- Encyclopedia of Sports in America: A History from Foot Races to Extreme Sports. Vol. 1, Colonial Years to 1939, Greenwood Press, Westport, Connecticut, 2009.
- Encyclopedia of Sports in America: A History from Foot Races to Extreme Sports. Vol. 2, 1940 to Present, Greenwood, 2009.
- Children and Social Studies: Creative Teaching in the Elementary Classroom, Harcourt Brace College Publishers, Fort Worth, Texas, 2000.
- American Sports: A History of Icons, Idols, and Ideas, Greenwood, 2013.
- The National Basketball League: A History, 1935-1949, McFarland & Co., Jefferson, North Carolina, 2009.
- "Merl R. Eppse and studies of blacks in American history textbooks", American Educational Research Association, Annual Meeting, conference publication, 1988.
- Law in the Curriculum, Phi Delta Kappa Educational Foundation, Bloomington, Indiana, 1978.
- Big Ten Basketball, 1943/1972, McFarland & Company, Inc. Publishers, Jefferson, North Carolina, 2017.
- Shaquille O'Neal: A Biography, Greenwood, 2007.
- Bill Russell: A Biography, Greenwood, 2005.
- Abe Saperstein and the American Basketball League, 1960-1963: The Upstarts Who Shot for Three and Lost to the NBA, McFarland & Company, Inc., 2013.
- Multiculturalism and the School Curriculum: Historical Case Studies, Garland, New York; London, 2001.
- Papers of the Society for the Study of Curriculum History: 1980 and 1982, Society for the Study of Curriculum History, University Park, Pennsylvania, 1983.
- AIDS, The Search for Answers, Pennsylvania State University, College of Education, WPSX-TV video, 1987.
- The Originals: The New York Celtics Invent Modern Basketball, Bowling Green State University Popular Press, 1999.
- Children and Social Studies: Creative Teaching in the Elementary Classroom, Harcourt Brace Jovanovich College Publishers, 1992.
- Exploring America: How the U.S. is Depicted in Norway, ERIC Clearinghouse, Washington, D.C., 1991.
- Murry R. Nelson Writings, 1978-1991.
- "Insular America: The NBA Began in Akron? the Midwest Conference in the 1930s", International Journal of the History of Sport, pages 990–1010, August 8, 2006.
