= North Atlantic Conference (1946) =

Intercollegiate athletic conference in the United States

The North Atlantic Conference was a short-lived intercollegiate athletic conference of HBCUs that existed only during the 1946 season. The league had members in the state of Pennsylvania.

== Football champions ==
- 1946 – Cheyney State

== See also ==
- List of defunct college football conferences
