= Green Mountain Conference =

Vermont football conference

The Green Mountain Conference was a short-lived intercollegiate athletic football conference that existed only during the 1963 season. The league had members, as its name suggests, in the state of Vermont.

== Champions ==
- 1963 – Vermont

== See also ==
- List of defunct college football conferences
