= Vermont State Conference =

College sports conference, 1948–1950

The Vermont State Conference was a short-lived intercollegiate athletic conference that existed from 1948 to 1950. The league had members, as its name suggests, in the state of Vermont.

== Football champions ==
- 1948 – Middlebury and Saint Michael's (VT)
- 1949 – Middlebury
- 1950 – Saint Michael's (VT)

== See also ==
- List of defunct college football conferences
