= Twin River Collegiate Conference =

Athletic conference

The Twin River Collegiate Conference was a short-lived intercollegiate athletic conference that existed from 1976 to 1978. The league had members in the state of Minnesota.

== Football champions ==
- 1976 – Concordia–St. Paul
- 1977 – Concordia–St. Paul and Martin Luther (MN)
- 1978 – Concordia–St. Paul and Northwestern (MN)

== See also ==
- List of defunct college football conferences
