= Swift Memorial College =

College in Tennessee, US (1883–1952)

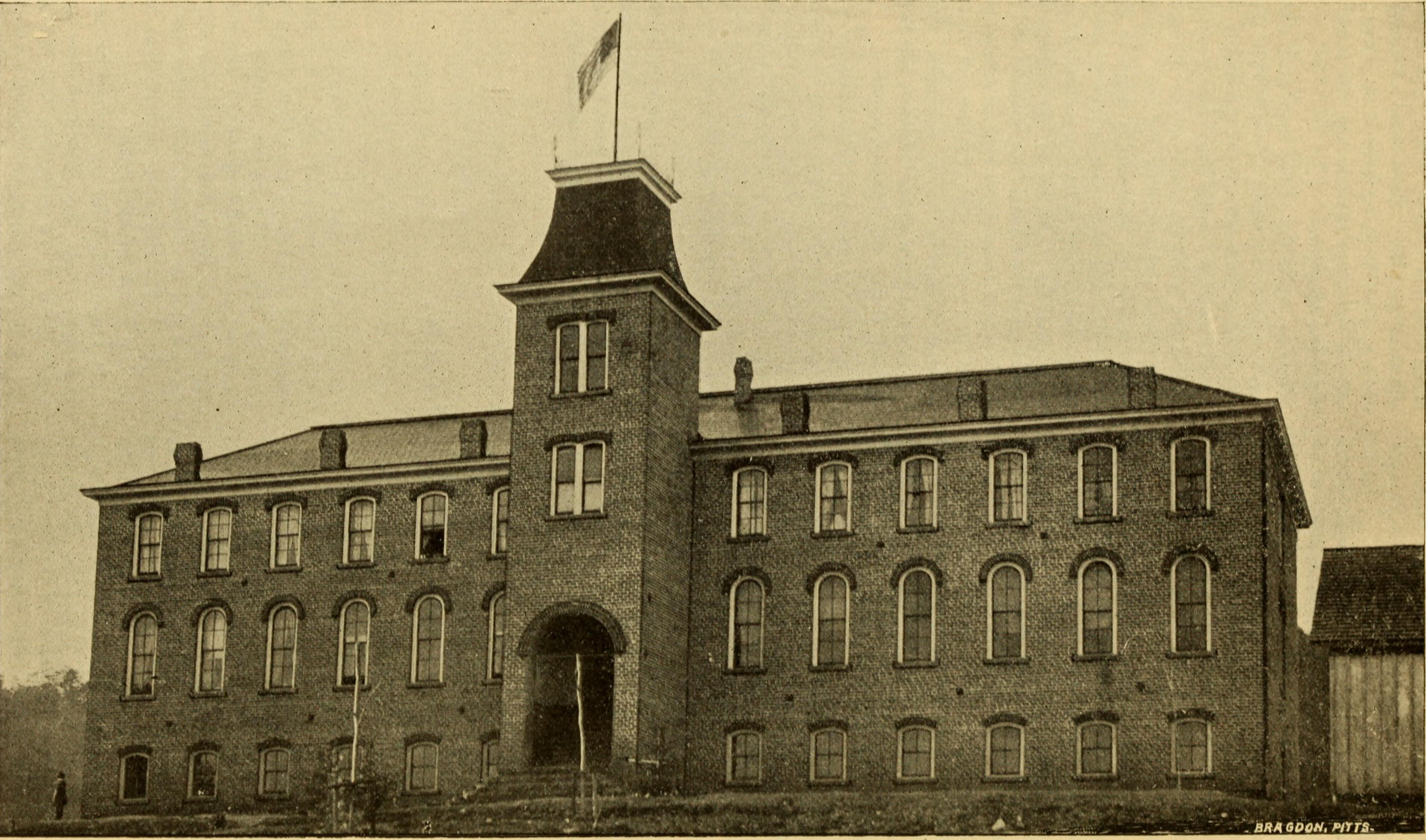
- Former names: Swift Memorial Institute, Swift Memorial Junior College
- Type: Private
- Active: 1883–1952
- Founders: Rev. William Henderson Franklin
- Affiliations: Maryville College
- Religious affiliation: Presbyterian Church in the United States of America, Presbyterian Board of Missions for Freedmen
- Location: Rogersville, Tennessee, United States; 36.407873°N 83.008150°W

Swift Memorial College was a private historically Black college established by the Presbyterian church that operated from 1883 to 1952, in Rogersville, Tennessee, United States. It was established after a state law ended access for African Americans to Maryville College. Like many other early HBCU's, the school curricula in the early years was focused on high school and normal school; later it operated as a junior college. It also served as a boarding school. It was later closed after desegregation.

== History ==
The state of Tennessee passed an extension of law in 1901 to their version of the 1870 Jim Crow law, which forced private schools such as Maryville College to expel their African American students. That same year in 1901, Maryville College trustees transferred US$25,000 to Swift Memorial College, a quarter of the school's endowment.

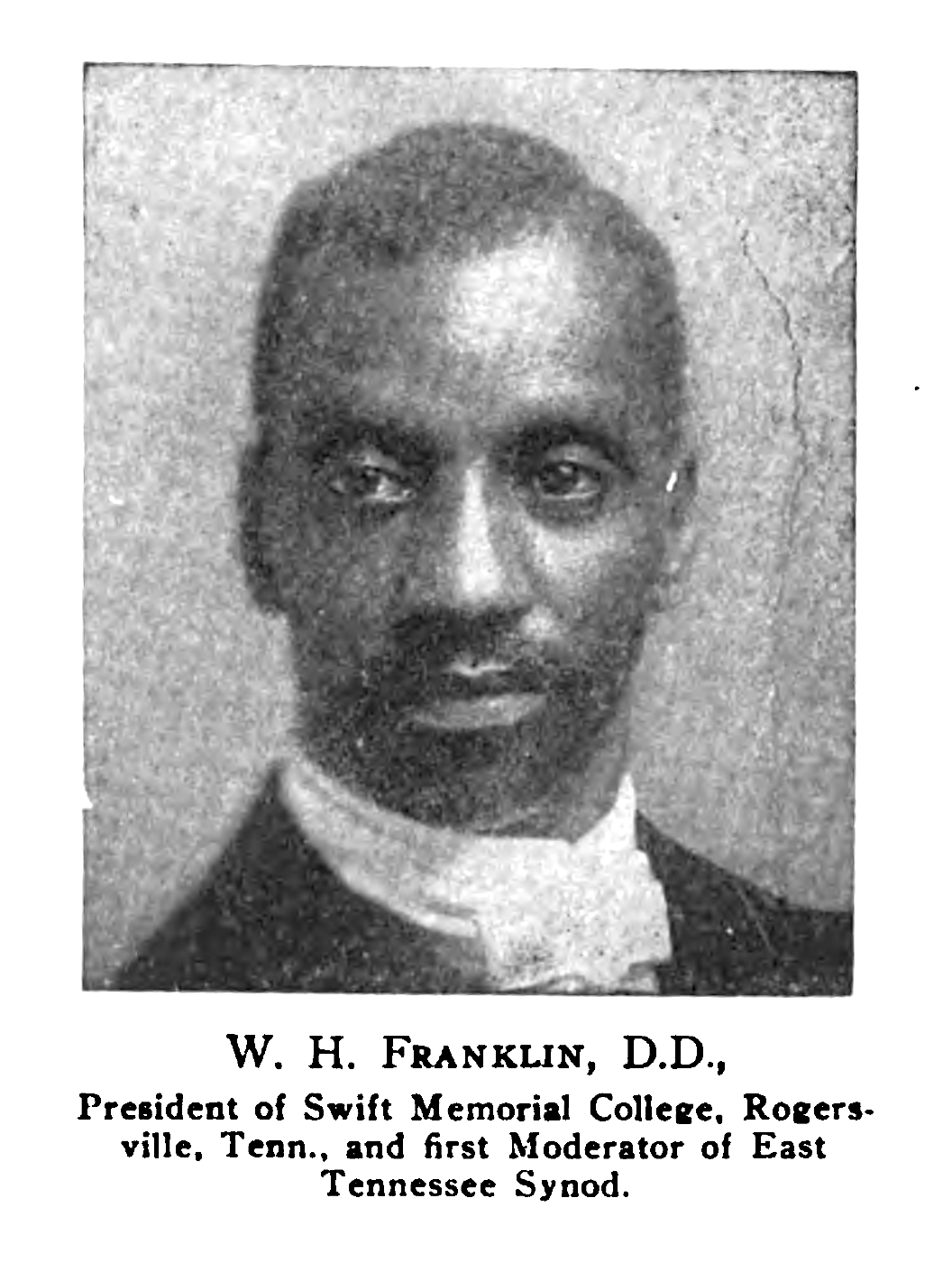
Founding principal, Rev. William Henderson Franklin (c. 1908)

The school was founded by Rev. William Henderson Franklin (1852–1935), who was the first African American to graduate from Maryville College (1880) in Maryville, Tennessee. It was named after Rev. E.E. Swift from Allegheny City, Pennsylvania, after his widow donated US$1000.

Swift Memorial College was supported by the Presbyterian Board of Missions for Freedmen and Maryville College, and it expanded the campus in 1903 to include dormitories, and the following year in 1904 they began a four-year college curriculum. Franklin served as the school principal from the opening in 1883 until his retirement in 1926.

In 1932, the Hawkins County School District and Swift Memorial entered an agreement to use Swift Memorial to teach Black public high school students. During this time period of segregation, the only public high school for Black students in the city was Price Public Elementary School (which now houses the Swift Museum) which acted as a feeder school for Swift Memorial.

== Closure and legacy ==
Notable people associated with the school include Merl R. Eppse, who worked as a former dean; and William A. Scott Jr., the founder of the Scott Newspaper Syndicate who attended as a student.

By 1955, the former campus buildings for Swift Memorial College were converted to community use and a school. In 1964, the building was demolished. The town of Rogersville has a historical marker in honor of the former school, erected by Tennessee Historical Commission.

== See also ==
- St. Marks Presbyterian Church (Rogersville, Tennessee)
