= List of defunct college football conferences =

This is a list of defunct college football conferences in the United States and a defunct university football conference in Canada. Not all of the conferences listed here are truly defunct. Some simply stopped sponsoring football and continue under their current names, where others changed their names after changes in membership.

== United States ==
- Conferences whose charter no longer functions, listed by year of dissolution.
  - ██ indicates a former Division I FBS/I–A or University Division conference
  - ██ indicates a former Division I FCS/I–AA conference
  - ██ indicates a former Division II/College Division conference
  - ██ indicates a former Division III conference
  - ██ indicates a former NAIA conference
  - † indicates a former conference, of any level, that technically still exists but under a different name
  - ‡ indicates a conference that still exists but has ended its sponsorship of football
- Successor conferences in **bold** are still in existence:

Conference	First season	Final season	Geographic areas	Predecessor(s)	Successor(s)
Eastern Collegiate Football Conference	2009	2024	Northeast	–	
North Star Athletic Association	2013	2024	The Dakotas	DAC	**Frontier**
Commonwealth Coast Football	2017	2022	New England	NEFC	**CCC**
Great Northwest Athletic Conference ‡ (Note: The GNAC entered into a football scheduling agreement with the Lone Star Conference in 2019. The two leagues had planned to continue said agreement through at least 2023, but this arrangement was scrapped after the 2021 season, with the three remaining GNAC football members becoming LSC football-only members starting in 2022. One of these three schools, Simon Fraser, dropped football after the 2022 season.)	2001	2021	Western States	–	
Central States Football League (Note: The CSFL did not compete in the 2012 season. In 2017, the Sooner Athletic Conference, which served as the primary conference for the majority of the CSFL's membership decided to sponsor football beginning in 2018. As a result, most of the league's remaining members shifted to that conference.)	2000	2017	Arizona, Midwest, South Central States	–	**Sooner**
Southern Collegiate Athletic Conference ‡ College Athletic Conference (1962–1991)	1962	2016	South	–	**SAA**
New England Football Conference †	1965	2016	New England	–	**CCC Football** (Note: After the 2016 football season, conference realignment left the NEFC with only five teams, all members of the all-sports Commonwealth Coast Conference (CCC). If the CCC had brought the NEFC fully under its umbrella, the CCC football schools would have lost their opportunity for automatic qualification to the Division III tournament. Accordingly, the CCC instead maintained the NEFC as a technically separate league but took over its administration, rebranding the NEFC as Commonwealth Coast Football (CCC Football). CCC Football later restored its membership to the level then required to maintain NCAA tournament qualification. CCC Football was fully merged into the all-sports CCC in 2022, following changes in Division III rules regarding automatic qualification for the D-III tournament.)
West Virginia Intercollegiate Athletic Conference	1924	2013	Pennsylvania, West Virginia	–	**Mountain East** (Note: Although the MEC was formed under a separate charter, there is considerable continuity between the MEC and WVIAC. Of the 12 original all-sports MEC members, eight had played WVIAC football in that conference's final season. (One of these inaugural MEC football members has since left the league.) As of the 2021 season, eight of the 12 current football members of the MEC had played in the final WVIAC football season, and a ninth was a non-football WVIAC member that later added the sport.)
Great West Conference; Great West Football Conference (2004–2008)	2004	2013	California, Interior West, Upper Midwest	–	**Big Sky**; **MVFC**
Western Athletic Conference (Note: Dropped football as a conference sport after the 2012 season, following a near-complete membership turnover from 2011 to 2013. All but two of the WAC's football schools left the conference in that period. Both remaining football schools, Idaho and New Mexico State, played as independents in the 2013 season before returning to football-only membership in the Sun Belt Conference in 2014. The WAC reinstated football in 2021 at the FCS level, and after the 2022 season merged its football league with that of the ASUN Conference, creating the United Athletic Conference.) ‡	1962	2012 *	Western States	–	**Mountain West**
Big East Conference †	1993	2012	Eastern States	–	**American** (Note: The American Athletic Conference operates under the same charter as the 1979–2013 version of the Big East Conference. After the 2013 split of the Big East, the schools that did not sponsor FBS football reorganized under a new charter as the current Big East Conference, having purchased that name from the remaining members. The remaining FBS members reorganized as the American Athletic Conference. However, The American does not recognize any of the football history of the Big East.)
Dakota Athletic Conference	2000	2012	The Dakotas	NDCAC; SDIC	North Star
Pacific-10 Conference †; Pacific-8 Conference (1964–1978); Big Six Conference (1962–1964); Big Five Conference (1959–1962); Athletic Association of Western Universities (1959–1968)	1959	2011	Arizona, California, Oregon, Washington	–	**Pac-12**
Great Lakes Football Conference	2006	2011	Midwest	–	**GLVC**
Atlantic Central Football Conference	1997	2010	Mid-Atlantic	–	Empire 8 NJAC; USA South
Gateway Football Conference (Note: Before 1985, the Gateway Collegiate Athletic Conference was a women's athletic conference whose membership featured several schools now in the Missouri Valley Conference (MVC). When the MVC stopped sponsoring its hybrid Division I-A (now FBS) and Division I-AA (now FCS) football league in 1985, the Gateway Conference took on football as its only men's sport. The initial football membership included the two I-AA football programs then in the MVC, plus the four final members of the AMCU football league. When the women's portion of the Gateway Conference merged with the MVC in 1992, the football conference maintained the Gateway charter, with a name change to Gateway Football Conference. In 2008, the Gateway Conference, by now featuring five current MVC members, changed its name to the Missouri Valley Football Conference to better align itself with the MVC. The two conferences, however, remain legally separate, although they operate out of the same offices in St. Louis.); Gateway Collegiate Athletic Conference (1985–1992) ‡	1985	2008	Plains States, Midwest States	–	**MVFC**
Illini-Badger Football Conference; Illini-Badger-Hawkeye Football Conference (1989–1990)	1976	2007	Illinois, Iowa, Wisconsin	–	**NACC**
North Central Conference; North Central Intercollegiate Athletic Conference (1922–1929)	1922	2008	Upper Midwest	–	
Metro Atlantic Athletic Conference (Note: Initially formed as a non-football conference, began sponsoring football in 1993. Dropped football after the 2007 season, after most of its member schools discontinued their football programs.) ‡	1993	2007	Mid-Atlantic States	–	–
Dixie Conference (1963–2003) †	1963	2003	Southern United States	–	**USA South**
Atlantic 10 Conference (Note: In 2007, the Colonial Athletic Association began sponsorship of football. However, the football conference that now operates under CAA administration as the technically separate entity of CAA Football has been in existence since 1938, under different charters: the New England Conference (1938–1945), the Yankee Conference (1947–1996), and the Atlantic 10 Conference (1997–2006). In 1997, the Atlantic 10 Conference, initially formed as a non-football conference, absorbed the Yankee Conference football programs and began football sponsorship in 1997. After several membership changes in the CAA in the early 2000s, the CAA had six schools with FCS football teams, and eventually, it was agreed that the CAA would take over management of the A-10 football conference. The changeover occurred in 2007. Further illustrating the continuity between conferences, the Yankee's automatic berth in the FCS playoffs passed in succession to the A-10 and CAA.) ‡	1997	2006	Mid-Atlantic States	Yankee	**CAA Football**
Upstate Collegiate Athletic Conference†	1995	2004	New York	–	**Liberty League**
Freedom Football Conference	1992	2003	New England, New York	–	**Empire Eight**; **NEFC**; **NJAC**; **Liberty League**
Nebraska-Iowa Athletic Conference †; Nebraska Intercollegiate Athletic Conference (1969–1992)	1969	2000	Iowa, Nebraska	–	**GPAC**
Big West Conference (Note: The Big West Conference, originally the Pacific Coast Athletic Association, adopted its current name in 1988 as it admitted more schools located in the interior West. Dropped football as a conference sport after the 2000 season.) ‡ Pacific Coast Athletic Association (1969–1988)	1969	2000	Western States	–	WAC
Columbia Football Association	1987	2000	Oregon, Washington	CFL	**GNAC**
Eastern Football Conference	1997	2000	Northeast	–	**Northeast-10**
North Dakota College Athletic Conference; North Dakota Intercollegiate Conference	1931	1999	North Dakota	–	Dakota AC
Indiana Collegiate Athletic Conference †	1987	1998	Ohio Valley	–	**HCAC**
Midwest Intercollegiate Football Conference; Midwest Intercollegiate Conference (1990)	1990	1999	Midwest	**Heartland**; **GLIAC**	**GLIAC**
South Dakota-Iowa Athletic Conference	1995	1999	Iowa, South Dakota	SDIC	DAC
Mid-Ohio Conference†; Mid-Ohio League (1949–1961)	1949	1998	Ohio	–	**American Mideast**
Northern California Athletic Conference; Far Western Conference (1925 –1982)	1925	1998	California, Nevada, Oregon	California Coast	–
Wisconsin State University Conference; Wisconsin State Normal Conference	1913	1997	Wisconsin	–	**WIAC**
Oklahoma Intercollegiate Conference	1974	1997	Oklahoma	OCC	**Lone Star**
Texas Intercollegiate Athletic Association	1976	1995	Texas	–	**ASC**
Eastern Collegiate Football Conference	1990	1997	New England	–	**CCC Football**
Southwest Conference	1914	1996	Arkansas, Texas	–	**Big 12**; **Conference USA**
Big Eight Conference; Big Seven Conference (1947–1958); Big Six Conference (1907–1946)	1907	1996	Interior West, Plains States	MVIAA	**Big 12**
Yankee	1947	1996	Mid-Atlantic States, New England	New England	Atlantic 10
American West Conference	1993	1996	California, Utah	Western	**Big Sky**; Big West
South Dakota Intercollegiate Conference	1917	1995	South Dakota	–	SDIAC
Arkansas Intercollegiate Conference	1928	1995	Arkansas	–	**Gulf South**; **Lone Star**; **SCAC**; **Sooner Athletic**; TransSouth Athletic
Association of Mideast Colleges	1991	1995	Kentucky, Ohio	–	–
Northern Intercollegiate Conference†; State Teacher's College Conference of Minnesota (1942 –1961); Northern Teachers Athletic Conference (1932–1941 )	1932	1993	Upper Midwest	–	**Northern Sun**
Western Football Conference	1982	1993	California, Utah	–	**Big Sky**; Great West
Missouri Intercollegiate Athletic Association †	1912	1992	Missouri	–	**MIAA**
Liberty Football Conference	1985	1992	New York	Met-Intercollegiate	**MAAC**
College Athletic Conference†	1962	1991	Southern United States	–	**SCAC**
Independent College Athletic Conference	1964	1991	New Jersey, New York	–	**Empire 8**
Atlantic Collegiate Football Conference	1988	1991	Mid-Atlantic	–	–
Heartland Collegiate Conference; Indiana Collegiate Conference (1951–1977)	1951	1989	Indiana, Ohio	–	MIFC
Tri-State Athletic Conference	1988	1989	Iowa, Nebraska, South Dakota	–	–
Colby-Bates-Bowdoin Conference	1965	1988	Maine	Maine IAA	**NESCAC**
Columbia Football League	1987	1988	Oregon, Washington	Evergreen	CFA
Intercollegiate Conference of Faculty Representatives †; Big Ten Conference (1917-1946, 1949–1987); Big Nine Conference (1899–1906, 1912–1917, 1946–1948); Western Conference	1896	1987	Midwestern United States	IAAN	**Big Ten**
Gulf Star Conference	1984	1987	Louisiana, Texas	–	**Southland**
Central States Intercollegiate Conference	1976	1986	Kansas, Missouri, Nebraska	Great Plains	**MIAA**
Missouri Valley Conference (Note: Dropped football as a conference sport after the 1985 season. As noted above, the Missouri Valley Football Conference is a separate entity from the MVC, although the football conference (which, as of the 2023 season, has six members in common with the MVC) has a licensing agreement with the MVC allowing it to use an adapted version of the MVC logo.) ‡	1907	1985	Illinois, Indiana, Oklahoma	–	**Mountain West**
Hoosier-Buckeye Conference; Hoosier Conference (1948–1970)	1948	1985	Indiana, Ohio	–	**HCAC**
Pacific Northwest Conference	1926	1984	Idaho, Oregon, Washington	–	Northwest
Evergreen Conference	1948	1984	Oregon, Washington	Washington Intercollegiate Conference	Columbia FL
Washington Intercollegiate Conference	1938	1947	Washington	Tri-Normal Conference	Evergreen
Met-Intercollegiate Conference	1979	1984	New York	Metropolitan IC	Liberty FC
Mid-Continent Athletic Association (Note: Founded in 1982, it absorbed the former Mid-Continent Athletic Association and sponsored Division I-AA football through the 1984 season. Of the four schools that participated in AMCU football in the 1982–84 period, three now compete at the Division I FCS level in the football-only Missouri Valley Football Conference, and the other is an all-sports member of the FCS Ohio Valley Conference. After dropping football, the AMCU (informally known as the "Mid-Continent") became the Mid-Continent Conference in 1989, and adopted its current name of The Summit League in 2007. Currently, six Summit League members sponsor football; five are MVFC members and the other plays in the Pioneer Football League.) ‡ Summit League	1978	1981	Midwestern States	–	**Gateway/MVFC**; **Ohio Valley**
Tri-State Conference	1960	1980	Iowa, Minnesota, Nebraska, South Dakota	–	**GPAC**
Twin River Collegiate Conference	1976	1978	Minnesota	–	–
Metropolitan Intercollegiate Conference	1972	1977	New York	–	Met-Intercollegiate
Nebraska College Athletic Conference; Nebraska Intercollegiate Conference (1916–1926)	1916	1976	Nebraska	–	**NIAC/GPAC**
Great Plains Athletic Conference	1972	1976	Colorado, Plains States	RMAC	**CSIC**; **North Central**; **RMAC**
Middle Three Conference	1929	1975	New Jersey, Pennsylvania	–	Big Ten; MAC; **Patriot**
Virginia Collegiate Athletic Association	1972	1975	Virginia	Virginia Little Eight	**ODAC**
Mason-Dixon Conference	1936	1974	Mid-Atlantic States	Chesapeake	**ODAC**
Gateway Conference	1962	1974	Illinois, Wisconsin	–	–
Eastern Football Conference	1965	1974	Northeast	–	–
Maine Intercollegiate Athletic Association	1893	1973	Maine	–	Yankee; **NESCAC**
Oklahoma Collegiate Conference	1929	1973	Oklahoma	Oklahoma IC (I)	Oklahoma IC (II)
Mid-South Athletic Conference†	1971	1972	Mid-South	–	**Gulf South**
Missouri College Athletic Union	1924	1970	Missouri	MIAA	**Heart of America**
Gulf States Conference	1948	1970	Alabama, Louisiana, Mississippi	Louisiana IC	–
Alabama Collegiate Conference	1960	1969	Alabama	Alabama Intercollegiate	**Gulf South**
Central Intercollegiate Athletic Conference	1928	1968	Kansas, Missouri	–	**KCAC**; Great Plains
Prairie College Conference	1953	1988	Illinois, Indiana	–	–
Western Pennsylvania Conference	1958	1967	Pennsylvania	–	–
Midwestern Conference; Midwest Conference (1962–1963); Midwest Athletic Association (1926–1961)	1926	1966	Central States	–	–
Oregon Collegiate Conference	1950	1965	Oregon	–	Evergreen
South Carolina Little Three; South Carolina Little Four (1946–1951)	1946	1964	South Carolina	–	–
Great Plains College Association	1963	1964	Nebraska	–	–
Mountain States Conference	1938	1963	Interior West	RMAC; Border	Big 8 WAC
Green Mountain Conference	1963	1963	Vermont	–	–
Border Intercollegiate Athletic Association	1931	1962	Arizona, New Mexico, Texas	–	WAC
Frontier Conference; New Mexico Intercollegiate Conference (1940–1954)	1940	1962	Arizona, Colorado New Mexico, Oklahoma, Texas	–	–
Volunteer State Athletic Conference	1949	1962	Tennessee	Smoky Mountain	–
South Atlantic Athletic Conference	1910s	1950s	Georgia, North Carolina, South Carolina, Tennessee	–	SEAC
Southeastern Athletic Conference	1940	1960s	Florida, Georgia, South Carolina	SAAC	–
South Central Athletic Conference	1942	1961	Southern United States	–	**SWAC**
Badger-Gopher Conference; Badger-Illini Conference (1948–1956 college football season ) Badger State Intercollegiate Conference (1940–1947); Tri-State Conference (1932–1939 )	1932	1961	Minnesota, Wisconsin	–	–
Gulf Coast Athletic Conference	1958	1961	Louisiana, Texas	–	–
Pacific Coast Conference	1915	1959	Pacific States, Interior West	–	**Pac-12**
Alabama Intercollegiate Conference	1938	1959	Alabama	–	Alabama Collegiate
Eastern Intercollegiate Athletic Conference	1940	?	South Atlantic States	–	**CIAA**
Western New York Little Three Conference	1946	1958	Western New York	–	–
Virginia Little Eight Conference; Virginia Little Seven Conference (1954–1955); Virginia Little Six Conference (1949–1953 )	1949	1958	Virginia	–	Mason-Dixon; VCAA
Smoky Mountain Conference	1927	1957	Tennessee, Virginia	–	Volunteer State
Big Seven Conference	1947	1957	Colorado, Plains States	Big Six; Skyline	Big 8
Gulf Coast Conference	1949	1957	Texas	**Lone Star**	SIAC
Central Church College Conference	1951	1957	Missouri, Nebraska	–	–
Texas Collegiate Athletic Conference	1926	1956	New Mexico, Texas	TIAA	Southwest; **Lone Star**
New Mexico Intercollegiate Conference	1940	1954	New Mexico	–	–
Dixie Conference (1948–1954)	1948	1954	Southeastern United States	–	–
Midlands Conference	1947	1952	Illinois, Iowa, Wisconsin	–	–
Interstate Intercollegiate Athletic Conference; Illinois Intercollegiate Athletic Conference (1908–1950)	1908	1970	Illinois, Michigan	–	**MAC**
Indiana Intercollegiate Conference	1922	1950	Indiana	–	Indiana CC
Vermont State Conference	1948	1950	Vermont	–	–
Upper Peninsula Conference	1949	1949	Michigan	–	–
Pioneer Conference	1947	1949	Illinois	–	–
Nebraska Intercollegiate Athletic Association	1928	1948	Nebraska	–	–
Dakota-Iowa Athletic Conference	1946	1948	Iowa, South Dakota	–	–
Louisiana Intercollegiate Conference	1939	1947	Louisiana	–	Gulf States
New England Conference	1923	1946	New England	–	Yankee
North Atlantic Conference	1946	1946	Mid-Atlantic States	–	–
Southern Intercollegiate Athletic Association	1894	1942	Southern United States	–	**Southern**; SAIAA; Dixie; Louisiana
Illinois Intercollege Conference	1938	1942	Illinois	–	–
Dixie Conference (1930–1941)	1930	1941	Southeastern United States	–	–
Michigan-Ontario Collegiate Conference	1930	1941	Michigan, Ontario	–	–
South Dakota College Conference	1933	1940	South Dakota	–	–
Alamo Conference	1936	1940	Texas	–	–
Eastern Pennsylvania Collegiate Conference	1926		Pennsylvania	–	–
Buckeye Athletic Association	1926	1939	Ohio	Ohio Athletic	**Mid-American**
Tri-Normal Conference	1922	1937	Washington	–	WINCO
Chesapeake Conference	1933	1937	Virginia	Virginia	Mason-Dixon; Virginia Little Eight
Virginia Conference	1928	1935	Virginia	–	Chesapeake; **Southern**
New York State Conference	1925	1934	New York	–	–
Mississippi Valley Conference	1928	1934	Mid-South	–	–
Tri-State Conference (1923–1934)	1923	1934	Ohio, Pennsylvania, West Virginia	–	–
Middle Atlantic Athletic Association	1934	1936	Mid-Atlantic	–	–
Texas Intercollegiate Athletic Association	1909	1932	Texas	–	–
Northwest Ohio League; Little Ohio Conference	1921	1932	Ohio	–	–
Big Four Conference of Wisconsin	1923	1932	Wisconsin	–	–
Michigan Collegiate Conference	1926	1932	Michigan	–	–
Big Four Conference	1929	1932	Oklahoma	Oklahoma Intercollegiate	–
Metropolitan Conference	1923	1931	New York	–	–
Arkansas Association	1927	1929	Arkansas	–	Arkansas Intercollegiate
Metropolitan Collegiate Conference	1928	1929	New York	–	–
Kansas Collegiate Athletic Association; Kansas College Athletic Conference (1902–1920); Kansas Intercollegiate Athletic Association (1890–1901)	1890	1928	Kansas	–	KCAC (II)
Oklahoma Intercollegiate Conference	1914	1928	Oklahoma	–	OCC; Big Four Conference
Missouri Valley Intercollegiate Athletic Association	1907	1927	Iowa, Kansas, Missouri, Nebraska, Oklahoma	–	Big Six; Missouri Valley
Western Interstate Conference	1923	1927	Illinois, Iowa	–	–
Louisiana Intercollegiate Athletic Association	1912	1925	Louisiana	SIAA	SIAA; Louisiana IC
California Coast Conference	1922	1924	California	–	Far Western
Middle Atlantic States Collegiate Athletics Association†	1913	1922	Mid-Atlantic States	–	**MAC**
South Atlantic Intercollegiate Athletic Association	1911	1921	East Coast	–	**Southern**
Little Five Conference	1912	1917	Illinois	–	Illinois IAC
Hawkeye College Conference	1914	1917	Iowa	–	**Iowa IAC**; Western IC
Indiana College Athletic League	1916	1917	Indiana	–	–
Kentucky Intercollegiate Athletic Association	1914	1916	Kentucky	–	**KIAC**
Colorado Football Association	1890	1908	Colorado	–	**RMAC**
Triangular Football League; Northeast Intercollegiate League (1891–1892); Eastern Intercollegiate Football Association (1887–1890); Northern Intercollegiate Football Association (1885–1886)	1885	1901	Massachusetts, New Hampshire	–	–
Maryland Intercollegiate Football Association	1894	1899	Maryland	–	SAIAA
Western Interstate University Football Association	1892	1897	Iowa, Kansas, Missouri, Nebraska	–	MVIAA
Illinois Intercollegiate Football League	1891	1895	Illinois	–	–
Indiana Intercollegiate Athletic Association	1890	1894	Indiana	–	–
Middle States Intercollegiate Football League	1893	1894	New Jersey, Pennsylvania	–	–
Intercollegiate Athletic Association of the Northwest	1892	1893	Illinois, Michigan, Minnesota, Wisconsin	–	**ICFR**
Pennsylvania Intercollegiate Football Association	1891	1891	Pennsylvania	–	–

== Canada ==
- Ontario-Québec Intercollegiate Football Conference (1975–2000) – This conference existed with varying membership with many Ontario teams leaving for the current Ontario University Athletics in 1980. The remaining Ontario teams departed after the 2000 season and the remaining Quebec teams ultimately became the Quebec University Football League in 2004.

== See also ==
- List of defunct college football teams
