= Washburn, Tennessee =

- Unincorporated community
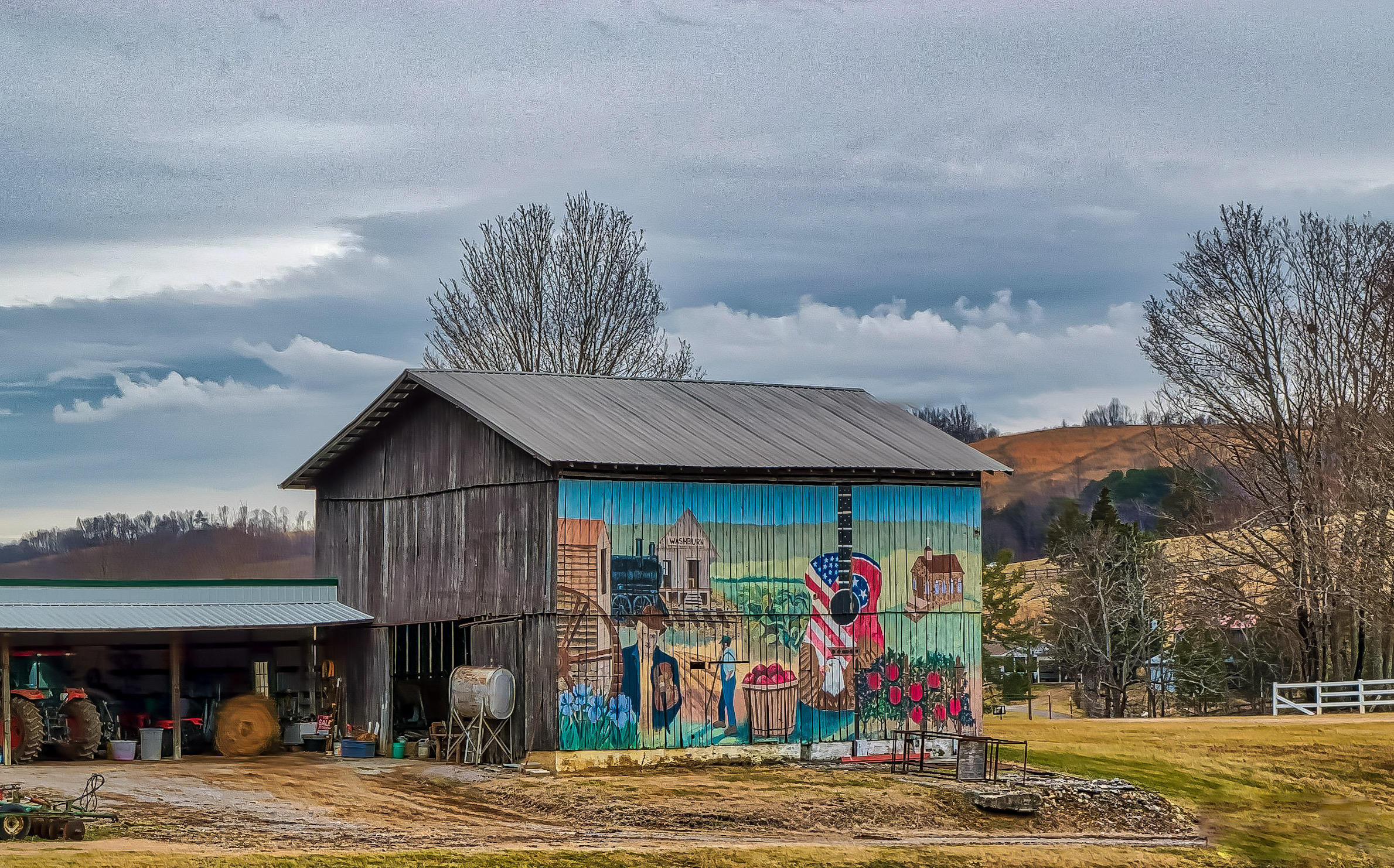
- Painted barn in Washburn near SR 131

- Location within Tennessee Location within the United States
- Coordinates: 36°17′24″N 83°35′28″W
- Country: United States
- State: Tennessee
- County: Grainger
- Elevation: 1,447 ft (441 m)

Population (2000)
  - Total: 2,408
- Time zone: UTC-5 (Eastern (EST))
  - Summer (DST): UTC-4 (EDT)
- ZIP code: 37888
- Area code: 865
- FIPS code: 47-47057
- GNIS feature ID: 1304392

Washburn is an unincorporated community in rural northern Grainger County, Tennessee, United States. It is part of both the Knoxville metropolitan area and the Morristown metropolitan area. As of the 2020 United States census, the total population of Washburn was 3,289.

== History ==
Forty-one days prior to the naming of the town on June 2, 1898, Knoxville-born Rear Admiral Washburn Maynard, son of local politician and Postmaster General Horace Maynard, fired the first shot of the Spanish–American War from the gunboat USS Nashville off the coast of Cienfuegos, Cuba. Rear Admiral Washburn Maynard and the USS Nashville were instrumental in the capture of the Spanish steamer Buena Ventura and several other vessels. The crew of the USS Nashville also participated in the May 11, 1898, heroic mission of cutting underwater Spanish telegraph cables. It is proposed that partially in honor of former U.S. Postmaster General Horace Maynard, the post office and the town alike were named in honor of the then-recent war hero Washburn Maynard.

The town continued to grow well into the early twentieth century. In the 1950s, it was decided that northern Grainger County needed a secondary school of its own. Before this, any student who wished to go to school beyond the 8th grade had to find a way to get to Rutledge High School, across Clinch Mountain in the county seat of Rutledge. Washburn School was established to meet this need. Subsequently, as the idea of centralized schooling became popular, the smaller elementary schools, such as Thorn Hill Elementary, Liberty Hill School, and Powder Springs Elementary were closed and combined into the new Washburn Elementary School.

At the time, buildings of both Rutledge and Washburn High Schools were built in a similar design. This design similarity is still evident in both schools to this day.

In early 2004, the Grainger County Board of Education decided that a new comprehensive high school was needed in the county, residents of Washburn and surrounding areas became concerned that the county might decide to close Washburn High School and instead bus their children across Clinch Mountain every day. Rutledge High School was severely over capacity with more than 800 students, while Washburn High School had only some 200 students in grades 9 through 12. As of 2006, this situation was still unresolved. Construction on the new Grainger High School, with a planned capacity of 1600 students, began in 2006 and was scheduled for completion in 2008. About 1,000 students currently attend Grainger High School.

In July 2015, Washburn and Grainger County received international attention and social media backlash after a (now closed) hardware store owner in the community placed a ‘No gays allowed’ sign on the door of his business after the ruling of Obergefell v. Hodges by the Supreme Court of the United States.

== Geography ==
While many smaller communities exist in the area, such as Joppa, Powder Springs, Tater Valley, Liberty Hill, and Thorn Hill, Washburn is considered to be the central town of northern Grainger County, due to its access to most county services.

== Economy ==
Commercial and public services include a bank, post office, storage center, school, library, and a medical clinic, as well as several private businesses.

== Education ==
Washburn is home to the only operating public school in northern Grainger County. The Washburn School complex is a pre-kindergarten through 12th grade school.
