= Tennessee House of Representatives 35th district =

State legislative district in Tennessee

Tennessee's 35th State House of Representatives district
- Map of Tennessee House districts with the 35th District shaded in red
Representative
William Slater; R–Gallatin
since 2023
- Demographics: 70.3% White; 13.4% Black; 9.9% Hispanic; 1.5% Asian; 4.1% Multiracial
- Population (2024): 73,024

The Tennessee House of Representatives 35th district is one of the 99 legislative districts in the lower house of the Tennessee General Assembly. The district is located in Middle Tennessee and covers Trousdale and part of Sumner counties. The district includes much of Gallatin and surrounding unincorporated areas. It also includes Hartsville, which is a consolidated city-county contiguous with Trousdale County. Much of the southern border of the district is formed by Old Hickory Lake and the Cumberland River. William Slater has represented the district since 2023.

== Demographics ==
The Tennessee Comptroller estimates the population as of 2024 at 73,024.

- 70.3% of the district is White
- 13.4% of the district is Black
- 9.9% of the district is Hispanic
- 1.5% of the district is Asian
- 4.1% of the district is Two or more races

Detailed demographic information is also available through Census Reporter.

== History ==
The 88th Tennessee General Assembly was the first in which all districts were numbered. At that time, the 35th district was part of Claiborne, Grainger, and Hancock counties. At the 93rd GAs, it was part of Claiborne, Grainger, and Hancock, Jefferson, and Sevier counties. From the 94th-97th GAs, it was composed of Grainger and Jefferson counties. At the 98th GA, it was composed of Marshall, Rutherford, and Wilson counties. From the 99th-102nd GAs, it was again composed of Grainger and Jefferson counties. From the 103rd-107th GAs, it was composed of Claiborne, Grainger and part of Jefferson counties. From the 108th-112th GAs, it was composed of Claiborne, Grainger and part of Union counties. Since the 113th General Assembly, it has been part of Trousdale and part of Sumner counties.

== List of Representatives ==
Representative	Party	Years of Service	General Assembly	Hometown
William Slater	Republican	2023–present	113th-114th	Gallatin
Jerry Sexton	Republican	2015–2022	109th-112th	Bean Station
Dennis Roach	Republican	1995–2014	99th-108th	Rutledge
Motley Mires	Democratic	1993–1994	98th	Mt. Juliet
Frank Nicely	Republican	1989–1992	96th-97th	Strawberry Plains
Lynn Lawson	Republican	1985–1988	94th-95th	Talbott
Bill Atchley	Republican	1983–1984	93rd	Sevierville
Mike Robertson	Republican	1977–1982	90th-92nd	Cumberland Gap
Olen Marshall	Republican	1973–1976	88th-89th	Bean Station
