= Thorn Hill, Tennessee =

- Unincorporated town
- Thorn Hill
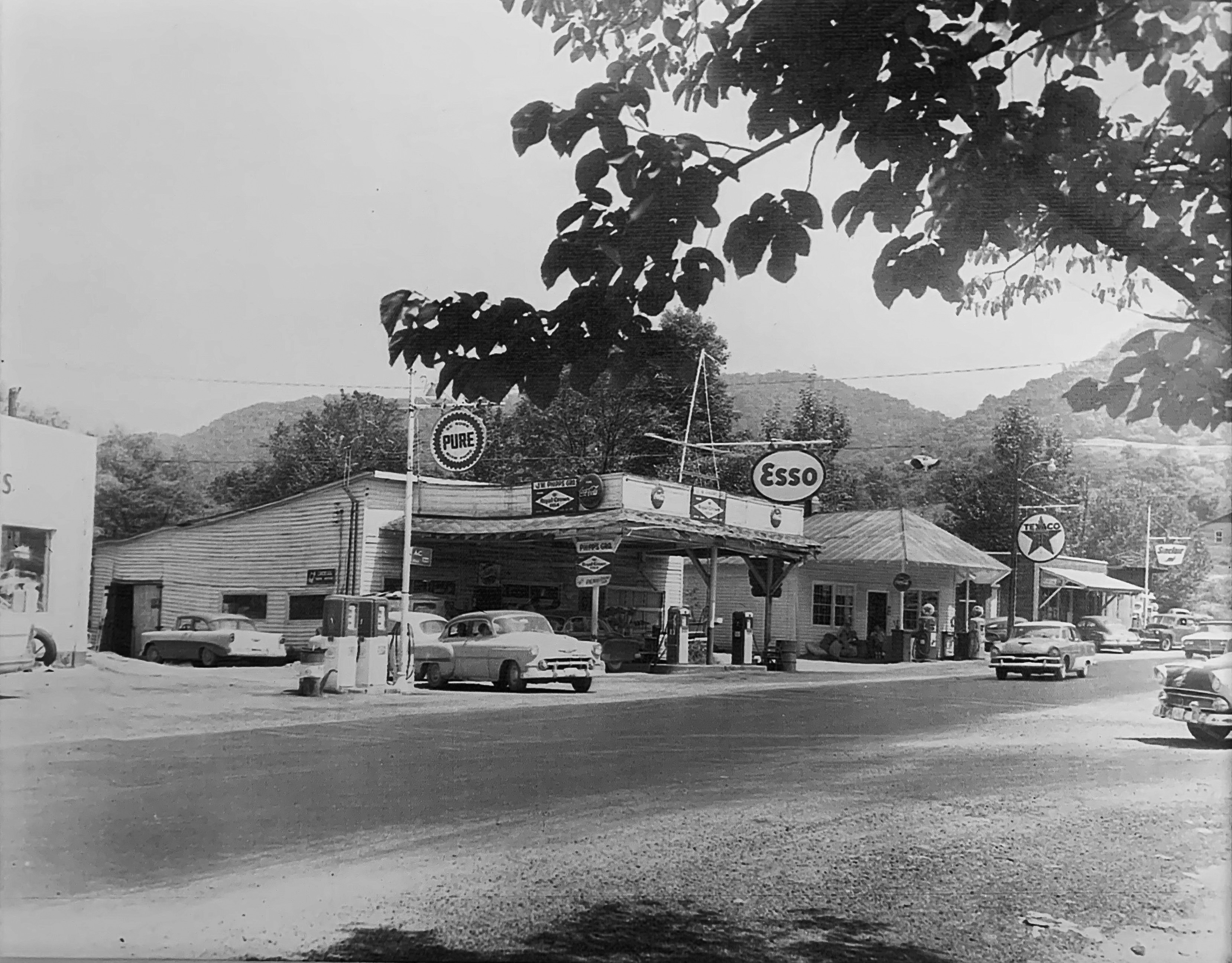
- Downtown Thorn Hill alongside old U.S. Route 25E, circa 1940s

- Location within Tennessee Location within the United States
- Coordinates: 36°21′30″N 083°25′03″W
- Country: United States
- State: Tennessee
- County: Grainger
- Elevation: 1,381 ft (421 m)
- Time zone: UTC-5 (Eastern (EST))
  - Summer (DST): UTC-4 (EDT)
- ZIP code: 37881
- Area code: 865
- FIPS code: 47-47057
- GNIS feature ID: 1314397

Thorn Hill is an unincorporated community in rural northeastern Grainger County, Tennessee. It is part of the Morristown Metropolitan Statistical Area which consists of Grainger, Hamblen, and Jefferson counties.

== History ==
In 1901 in Thorn Hill, a four year conflict between two families, known locally as "The Battle of Thorn Hill," began following the murder of a prominent resident. The feud fueled acts of violence such as assassinations of prominent citizens and racially motivated murders against African Americans in public places and businesses.

In 1976, construction on the widening of US 25E into a four-lane limited-access highway from Thorn Hill across Clinch Mountain to Bean Station would begin, and it would complete construction in 1980. During the project, Tennessee Department of Transportation officials faced multiple landslides impeding the project's process.

== Geography ==
Thorn Hill is located in the central northeastern corner of Grainger County. It is situated adjacent to the intersection of U.S. Route 25E, and Tennessee State Route 131. Clinch Mountain and adjacent ridges in the Clinch River Valley rise prominently to the south and north of Thorn Hill respectively.

== Economy ==
From the early 1940s to the late 2000s, Thorn Hill was the location of the Imperial Black Marble Quarry, which mined Tennessee marble. The black marble extracted from the mine was used in the Tennessee State Capitol, Knox County Courthouse, National Archives Building, and the Washington Monument. In 2007, the mine was purchased by the Tennessee Marble Company, with no immediate plans to reopen the facility.

Thorn Hill is the also the site of the Clinch Valley Zinc Deposit, which is part of the larger Copper Ridge Zinc Mining District. The zinc deposit was first reported to be discovered around 1950 and mining operations began in 1977.

== Education ==
Thorn Hill does not have a school located in the community. Students must attend school at either Washburn School (K-12), Bean Station Elementary School (K-6), Rutledge Middle School (7–8), or Grainger High School (9–12), all of which are a part of the Grainger County Schools district serviced by the Grainger County Board of Education.
