= Jerry Sexton =

Jerry Sexton may refer to:

- Jerry Sexton (rugby union)
- Jerry Sexton (politician)
