= Annex Creek =

Annex Creek may refer to:

- Annex Creek (Alaska), near Juneau, Alaska
- Annex Creek (Tennessee), in Grainger County, Tennessee
