= Joppa, Tennessee =

- Unincorporated community
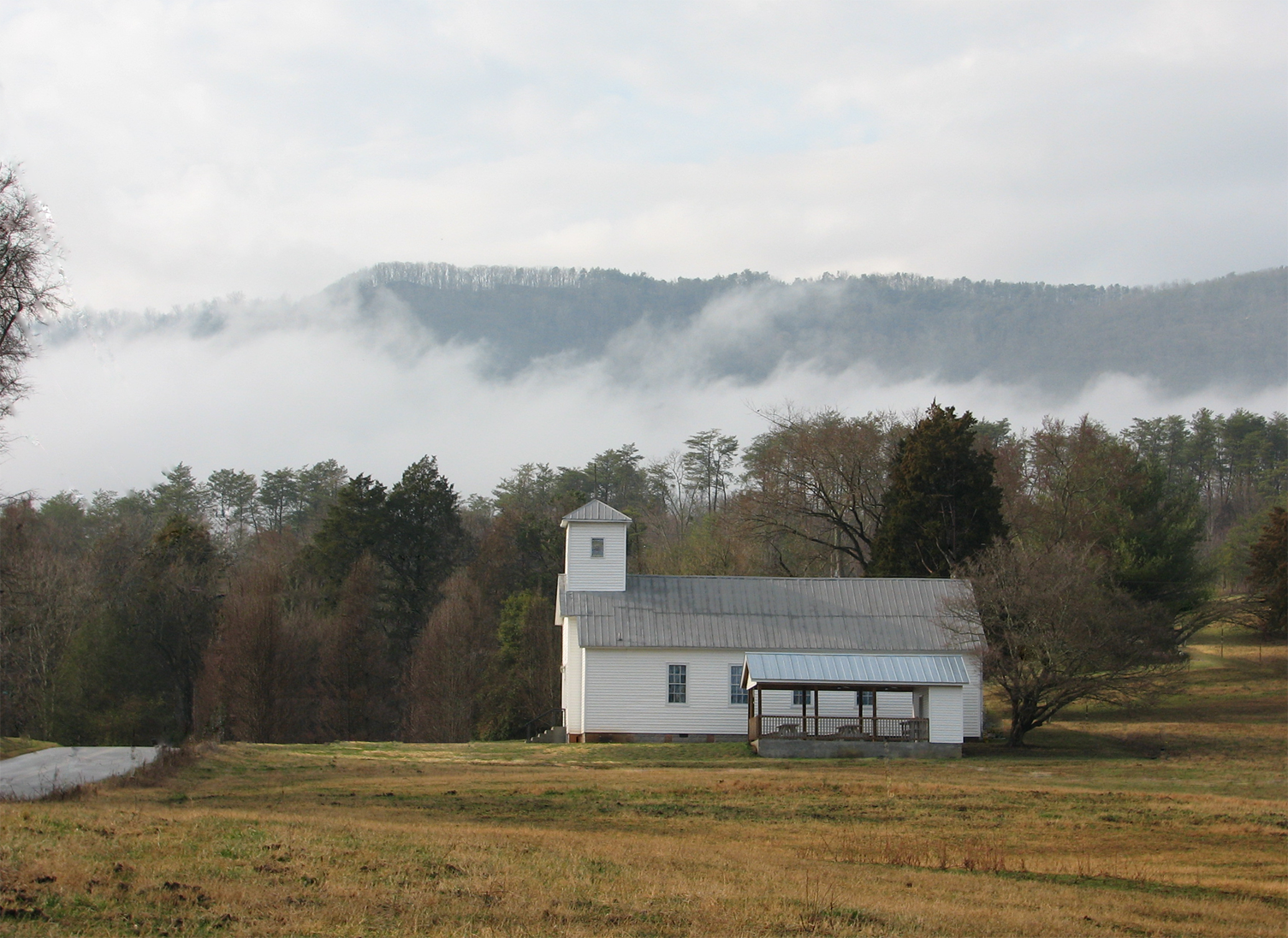
- Joppa United Methodist Church shadowed by Joppa (Clinch) Mountain

- Location within Tennessee Location within the United States
- Coordinates: 36°14′17″N 083°36′56″W
- Country: United States
- State: Tennessee
- County: Grainger
- Elevation: 965 ft (294 m)
- Time zone: UTC-5 (Eastern (EST))
  - Summer (DST): UTC-4 (EDT)
- ZIP code: 37861
- Area code: 865
- FIPS code: 47-38680
- GNIS feature ID: 1289831

Joppa is an unincorporated community in rural central-western Grainger County, Tennessee, United States. It rests below Joppa Mountain, a subrange located near the southern terminus of the 150 mile (240 km) long Clinch Mountain ridge complex, offering views of five U.S. States and the Great Smoky Mountains. Joppa is part of the Morristown, Tennessee Metropolitan Statistical Area, and also a component of the Knoxville-Morristown-Sevierville Combined Statistical Area.

== History ==
Joppa is situated along the Federal Road (U.S. Route 11W - Rutledge Pike), formerly known as the Old Lee Highway, which connected New Orleans and Washington, D.C. The road intersected the Old Kentucky Road (now U.S. Route 25E - Dixie Highway) at Bean Station, 18 miles (29 km) northeast of Joppa.

Jeremiah Jarnagin

One of the first deeds registered in Grainger County was from Capt. Thomas Jarnagin to Major and Lavinia Jarnagin Lea, on August 6, 1796, for 375 acres.

Jeremiah Jarnagin was the son of Capt. Thomas Jarnagin, friend of John Sevier, and fought in the Indian and Revolutionary Wars. Capt. Jarnagin purchased a land grant covering the area from present-day Joppa School to Blaine along Highway 11W, most of which he gave to his children. Capt. Jarnagin came and helped his son-in-law, Major Lea, build the Lea-Fox House in the early 1790s, and may have helped his son Noah build the Hickle House near Joppa School in 1794. Noah's wife, Mary Russell Jarnagin, was the niece of Lydia Russell Bean, wife of William Bean, the first white settler in Tennessee. Noah lived here until his death in 1849. The Hickle House was also used as a tavern at one time.

Jeremiah Jarnagin established his household in Grainger County in 1802. He acquired adjoining land to the extent that his boundary contained more than 1,600 acres. Jeremiah operated the Red House Tavern. This tavern got its name simply because it was painted red, probably the only painted structure for many miles. Andrew Jackson, seventh president of the United States, spent time at this tavern.

Jeremiah was a man of much strength. In the closing days of the Civil War, when a soldier seeking to enter his cellar and carry away his provisions, although bearing the weight of 80 years upon his shoulders, with his strong right arm he quickly felled the soldier to the floor. So impressed was the commanding officer that he ordered his soldiers to ride away.

American Civil War

Early during the American Civil War, Confederate cannons were mounted at the Powder Spring Gap on Clinch Mountain facing the Clinch Valley in order to prevent Union forces crossing from the northwest side of the ridge to the Federal Road and the Richland Valley to the southeast. As the war progressed, Confederate soldiers engaged in guerrilla warfare tactics from numerous vantage points along Clinch Mountain, including the rocks and caves around Joppa Mountain's summit at Buzzard Rock where they extracted saltpeter, one of the ingredients of gunpowder, from the droppings of buzzards.

This guerrilla warfare largely paralyzed Grainger County during the war. Confederate General James Longstreet, who had earlier failed to wrest Knoxville from Union forces, on December 14, 1863, in what became known as the Battle of Bean's Station, attacked a Union detachment that had been pursuing him. The Confederates failed to exploit the element of surprise, and the Union forces were able to hold out until reinforcements arrived. While Longstreet was victorious, Union forces were able to retreat through Joppa en route to fortifications at Blaine, and Longstreet subsequently abandoned the assault and continued his retreat from Knoxville eastward to winter quarters at Russellville. He rejoined the Army of Northern Virginia the following spring.

Sulphur Springs Academy

Rev. William Kindsland deeded one acre of land to trustees J.N. Mitchell, J.H. Weaver and George Lyons to be used as a school site, May 30, 1874. School at that time was being taught in a small log church, known as Sulphur Springs Baptist Church. A one-room building was constructed, and it is believed that the late J.T. Justus was the first teacher. Later, a second room was added to the school.

Academies were first heard of about 1806, but did not do much until 1816 when the State of Tennessee received a grant from the [Federal] government sufficient for one academy in each county. Those academies took the place of high schools. The state paid for land, building and boarding houses.

The Grainger County Academy was in Rutledge, and was called Madison Academy (named after President James Madison). C.C. Justus was appointed to look after the school. Around 1868, after a second room was added at Sulphur Springs School, they added advanced subjects such as Latin and Algebra. This was about the time Sulphur Springs Academy at Joppa came into existence. The school was small, but enrollment was large. Mr. J.M. Justus built houses to be used as dormitories where the pupils went to study between classes.

People who attended the Sulphur Springs Academy came for a purpose, to learn. Many teachers, doctors, lawyers, postal workers, bankers, judges and musicians were educated at the Sulphur Springs Academy in Spring House (now Joppa), Tennessee.

The Old Joppa School (known today as Joppa Elementary School) was built circa 1878 and burned in approximately 1899. In 1900, a second building was constructed through personal donations to accommodate grades 1-8, which by this time the Peavine train was running and many people rode the train to school. The Old Joppa School was demolished in 1966 to make way for a third building that was built the following year.

In 1881, Sunday school service was started in the Old Joppa School. On December 26, 1921, John and Mary Morgan deeded 1/4 acre of land, and in 1922 a church (known today as Joppa United Methodist Church) was organized. On May 4, 1924, the current church building was dedicated.

Spring House, Tennessee

Spring House Post Office was a small building over a spring in front of the Seymour home. In the same community, located behind where Joppa School is located today, was a church called Spring House Baptist Church. An African-American minister came and preached a series of sermons in the church and it is said by those who attended that each sermon was centered around the city of Joppa, and he made the statement that "Joppa was a sabbath day's journey from Jerusalem." There was a young man, Marshall Lowe, noted for his humor, who heard these sermons and began to have a saying, "Let's all go over to Joppa."

In 1894, Professor P.E. Aston and C.C. Justus, both of whom taught at the former Sulphur Springs Academy, approached the Tennessee State Legislature and was subsequently successful in having the name of "Spring House Post Office" (1845–1893) changed to Joppa. The post office was then moved from a location near Ellis Farm on Blaines Chapel Road to the J.H. Hammer Store near the intersection of U.S. Route 11W and Joppa Mountain Road, where it was then changed to the name of "Joppa Post" (1933–1950) until its closure. In April 2012, the Grainger County Board of Education authorized negotiations to purchase the old Joppa Post store for possible future use as a drip field for the sewer system at Joppa Elementary School. On June 18, 2012, the Grainger County BOE completed the purchase of the old Joppa Post store for $28,500, and soon after the structure was razed.

Cherokee Lake, created by the Tennessee Valley Authority in 1941 with the completion of Cherokee Dam, is located just southeast of Joppa.

Hang Gliding

Hang gliding from Joppa (Clinch) Mountain is the goal of many hang gliding enthusiasts around the world, according to the president of one of the largest hang gliding associations in the United States. Hang gliding on Joppa Mountain started in the mid-1970s and enjoyed considerable notoriety until the late 1980s. The 1979 USHPA regional competition was held on Joppa Mountain, which is also the site of the Tennessee Flex Wing Free Flight Record of 68.3 miles (109.9 km) by Ellis Newkirk. Area residents describe the weekends around the Joppa and Powder Springs communities as being full of activities, with spectators lined along U.S. Route 11W (Rutledge Pike) and TN State Route 131 as hang gliders would launch from Buzzard Rock, on the Joppa Mountain summit, and glide over the Poor, Richland, and Clinch Valleys, landing at various local landing zones or destinations as far away as Virginia, Kentucky, and Chattanooga, Tennessee.

== Geography ==
Joppa is located in western Grainger County at 36°14′16.76″N 83°36′55.71″W (36.279991, -83.518008). The community is within the Richland Valley, and extends north into the parallel, smaller Poor Valley. Richland Valley stretches for some 35 miles (56 km) along the southern base of Clinch Mountain Ridge between Blaine and Rutledge. Originating in the hills behind Grainger County High School, Richland Creek traverses most of the valley en route to its confluence along the Holston River, approximately 14 miles (23 km) southwest of Joppa.

The area considered to be Joppa runs roughly from the top of Clinch Mountain Ridge just southwest of where Joppa Mountain Road crosses at Powder Spring Gap, then about 4.5 miles (7.2 km) northeasterly along the ridge to just above where the intersection of Corbin Lake and Poor Valley Roads meet between the Poor Valley Knobs, then turns south and runs roughly 2.5 miles (4.0 km) across U.S. Route 11W to the top of the Richland Knobs near Owl Hole Gap Road. From there, it runs another 4.5 miles (7.2 km) southwesterly along the top of the Richland Knobs.

Joppa is centered around Joppa Elementary School located at the junction of the Federal Road/U.S. Route 11W/Rutledge Pike, which connects the community to Kingsport to the east and Knoxville to the west, and Joppa Mountain Road, which crosses Clinch Mountain Ridge via the Powder Spring Gap to the community of Powder Springs to the northwest. Starting from the Clinch Mountain's southern terminus at Signal Point peak near Blaine, Joppa Mountain Road is the first of only twelve transportation crossings from southwest to northeast along its entire 150-mile (240 km) length.

From the Joppa Mountain summit at Buzzard Rock, elevation 2,530 feet (770 m), the U.S. states of Georgia, Kentucky, North Carolina, Virginia, and the entire breadth of eastern Tennessee can be seen, including the Great Smoky Mountains and Cumberland Gap.

== Natural history ==
=== Geology ===
Even by a geologist's standards, the Appalachians are very old mountains: The bedrock was formed 1 billion years ago and the mountains are 500 million years old, 10 times older and once taller than the Rockies, Sierras, Andes, and Himalayas. They have been created, worn down, and created again as a result of tectonic and weathering forces. Continental drift, a phenomenon that continues on earth's surface today, has played a major role.

The legacy of tectonic events in East Tennessee created the mountainous physiographic province known as the Valley and Ridge (commonly known as the Great Valley of East Tennessee), within which Joppa, TN is situated.

The Valley and Ridge takes its name from its long ridges and valleys oriented in a northeast-southwest direction. This topography was shaped by folding and faulting that occurred during the middle Ordovician period of the Paleozoic Era by the collision of plates. Great force from the east, possibly from northern Africa colliding into eastern North America, rippled the landscape like a rug pushed against a wall from one side. The collision which caused the uplift of the mountains began around 440 to 480 million years ago and ended around 230 million years ago. Then erosion set in, shaping more resistant rock into ridges and cutting valleys into weaker ones. The area is dominated by dolomite and highly erodible limestone, making caves numerous. The region has great habitat diversity and supports an especially diverse fish fauna, including the Upper Clinch River, which holds one of the most diverse fish faunas in North America.

=== Chestnut Flat ===
A small playa (flat) area below and just to the southwest of the Joppa Mountain summit named Chestnut Flat was once home to a large population of American chestnut trees, some of which may have reached heights of up to 200 feet (61 m). The pathogenic fungus is the causal agent of chestnut blight, a devastating disease of the American chestnut tree that caused a mass extinction of this once plentiful tree by 1920 in Grainger County, and by 1940 from its historic range in the eastern United States.
