= Eidson, Tennessee =

Eidson
- Unincorporated community
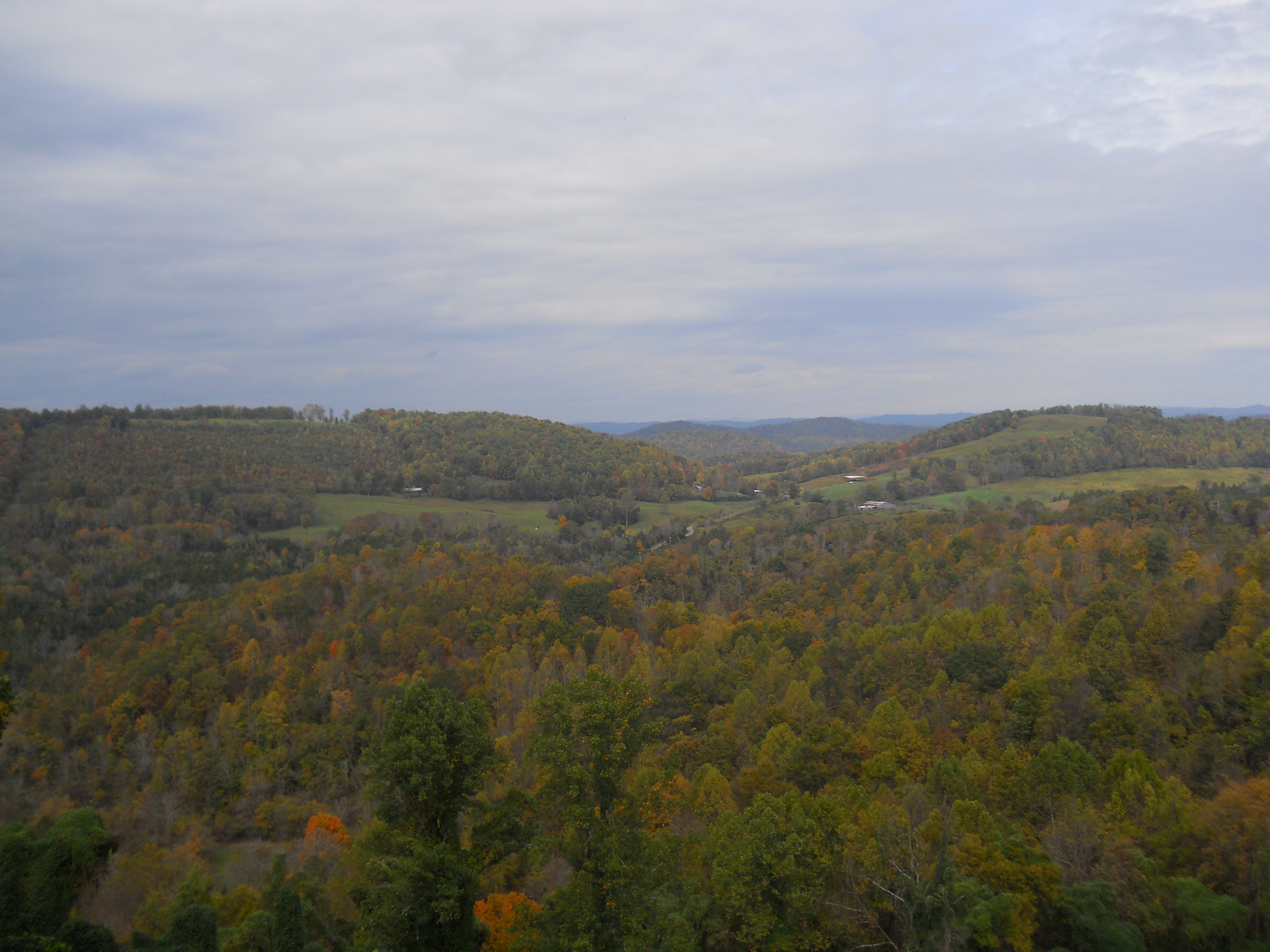
- Eidson as seen from Clinch Mountain

- Location within Tennessee Location within the United States
- Coordinates: 36°30′40″N 83°01′43″W
- Country: United States
- State: Tennessee
- County: Hawkins
- Settled: 1790s
- Named for: Samuel Eidson Sr.
- Elevation: 1,523 ft (464 m)
- Time zone: UTC-5 (Eastern (EST))
  - Summer (DST): UTC-4 (EDT)
- Zip Code: 37731
- Area code: 423
- GNIS feature ID: 1315008

Eidson is an unincorporated community located on the north side of Clinch Mountain in Hawkins County, Tennessee. It is part of the Kingsport-Bristol-Bristol, TN-VA Metropolitan Statistical Area, which is a component of the Johnson City-Kingsport-Bristol, TN-VA Combined Statistical Area – commonly known as the "Tri-Cities" region.

== History ==
Prior to any frontier settlements, a few Cherokee hunted along Clinch Mountain. Longhunters began exploring the area during the 1770s. They named some of the places found in the region. The Trail of the Lonesome Pine runs through Highway 70 just a few miles off the old Wilderness Trail in Virginia. The first settlements of the area took place during the 1790s. Families from the Carter Valley settlement crossed Clinch Mountain, and families from Virginia took the Lonesome Pine trail and crossed the Clinch River. It was during that time when a group of Chickamauga Indians raided the settlers along War Creek. Some of these battles took place at Big War Gap in Lee Valley and Little War Gap in Eidson. From that time on, the area north of Clinch Mountain was called War Gap in Hawkins County, Tennessee. During the mid 19th Century, Eidson was called Stringtown, and was later renamed after Samuel Eidson Sr., a local rancher of the area, and Andrew Jackson Eidson, a patriarch of the branch of Eidsons found throughout East Tennessee. Many Eidson are concentrated around upper Hawkins County. Hallelujah Acres was once located in Eidson, before moving to Shelby, North Carolina.

== Education ==
The community of Shiloh, near Eidson, is the site of Clinch School, a K-12 public school operated by Hawkins County. Clinch School is the smallest K-12 school in the state, with a 2019-2020 enrollment of 136 students. The main school building was constructed in 1938 as a Works Progress Administration project to provide a high school for the Eidson community. Before the high school was built, Clinch School ended at grade 10, and students wishing to continue their education past that level attended Rogersville High School, Grainger County High School, or Hancock County High School. A new Clinch School was under construction as of autumn 2009. Several churches of the area had schools. The community of Eidson once had its own school, but was later rezoned to Clinch. Lonesome Pine School was located near Frog Level. It was established in 1941 and ran until the 1960s. The building was later used by the Clinch Valley Fire Department.

== Postal service ==
Eidson is also the site of a post office, assigned the zip code 37731. In July 2011 the U.S. Postal Service identified the Eidson post office as one of 3,653 U.S. retail post offices proposed for closure.
