= William Slater (Tennessee politician) =

American politician (born 1961)

Member of the Tennessee House of Representatives from the 35th district
- Incumbent
- Assumed office January 10, 2023
- Preceded by: Jerry Sexton

Personal details
- Born: October 13, 1961 (age 65)
- Party: Republican
- Spouse: Danielle
- Children: 4
- Education: Hyles-Anderson College (BS); University of South Florida (M.Ed.); Nashville School of Law (JD)

William Slater (born October 13, 1961) is an American politician who has represented the 35th district in the Tennessee House of Representatives since 2023.

Slater's first campaign for the State House was in 2022, when he won the general election unopposed. He received the endorsement of former Governor of Arkansas Mike Huckabee.
