= New Corinth, Tennessee =

- Unincorporated community
- Location within Tennessee Location within the United States
- Coordinates: 36°12′06″N 83°36′55″W
- Country: United States
- State: Tennessee
- County: Grainger
- Elevation: 1,322 ft (403 m)
- Time zone: UTC-5 (Eastern (EST))
  - Summer (DST): UTC-4 (EDT)
- Area code: 865
- GNIS feature ID: 1315584

New Corinth is an unincorporated community in Grainger County, Tennessee, United States. New Corinth is 6 miles (9.7 km) east-northeast of Blaine.
