= Beech Grove, Grainger County, Tennessee =

Unincorporated community in Tennessee, US

Coordinates: 36°22′01″N 83°28′11″W

Beech Grove is an unincorporated community in Grainger County, Tennessee, in the United States.

== History ==
The community was named from the presence of beech trees near the town site.
