= Washburn School =

Location
- 7925 Highway 131; Washburn, Tennessee 37888; United States; 36.2935°N 83.5897°W

Information
- Type: Public
- School district: Grainger County School District
- Principal: Ginny McElhaney
- Faculty: 38.83 (FTE)
- Grades: K-12
- Enrollment: 496 (2022–23)
- Student to teacher ratio: 12.77
- Colors: Red, White and Black
- Athletics conference: TSSAA
- Mascot: Pirate
- Team name: Pirates/Lady Pirates
- ACT average: 16.6
- Website: https://washburn.grainger.k12.tn.us/

Washburn School is a public school located in Washburn, Tennessee, USA in the east division of the state. Currently there are over 600 students enrolled at the secondary school, with approximately 56 staff members, including principal Ginny McElhaney, and vice principal Aaron Clay.

Students at the school have the option to attend Grainger High School full-time or take classes not offered at Washburn.

Washburn School has basketball, baseball, softball, cross country, and cheer leading. Clubs include: Beta Club, FCCLA (Family, Career, & Community Leaders of America), Skills USA, FBLA (Future Business Leaders of America), Prom Committee, Jr. High Beta Club, Link Leaders, Yearbook Staff, Bass Club, Health Council, 4-H, Concession Club Workers, Middle School Math Club, FCA (Fellowship of Christian Athletes), and Youth Leadership. The campus has three gymnasiums, with one having a stage. There is one playground at the side of the school and a further one behind the elementary building. The baseball field is located in front of the school. A second baseball field is currently under construction behind the school.

The school has a library and a cafeteria. They also have art, library, computer lab, and physical education classes.

More than 60% of the students are below the poverty rate and the 2004 Agriculture spending bill instructed the Rural Development Agency to extend water lines to the school to provide drinkable water.
