= Jerry Sexton (politician) =

American politician (born 1957)

Member of the Tennessee House of Representatives from the 35th district
- In office January 2015 – January 2023
- Preceded by: Dennis Roach
- Succeeded by: William Slater

Personal details
- Born: March 9, 1957 (age 69) Claiborne County, Tennessee, U.S.
- Party: Republican
- Spouse: Marsha Sexton
- Education: Walters State Community College
- Profession: Furniture manufacturing owner; trucking firm owner; Southern Baptist preacher
- Website: www.capitol.tn.gov/house/members/h35.html

Jerry Sexton (born March 9, 1957) is a retired American politician who served as a Republican member of the Tennessee House of Representatives. Sexton represented Tennessee House District 35, an area in East Tennessee consisting of Grainger, Claiborne, and part of Union counties from 2015 until his retirement following redistricting in 2023. Sexton would be succeeded by several representatives, including Rick Eldridge, Gary Hicks, and Dennis Powers, for Grainger, Claiborne, and Union counties respectively following the dissolution of District 35.

== Early life ==
Jerry Sexton was born in 1957 and spent the first six years of his life in Claiborne County, Tennessee as one of ten children raised by a coal miner/furniture maker and his wife. His parents purchased their first, and only house in Grainger County when he was six years old.

Sexton entered elementary school at Bean Station, Tennessee and high school in Rutledge. Sexton would later attend Walters State Community College in Morristown, Tennessee.

== Tennessee General Assembly ==
Sexton has generated nationwide news media coverage due to the controversial nature of his proposed legislation within the Tennessee General Assembly that has been influenced by Christian nationalism and social conservatism, such as his sponsoring of state legislation opposing LGBT rights, access to women's health care and legal abortion services, and the separation of church and state.

== Sexton's legislative initiatives ==
=== 2016 ===
Sexton introduced HB0615 (sponsored by Steve Southerland in the senate) that, if enacted during 2016, would have designated the "Holy Bible", as the official state book of Tennessee and have this book itself featured as state trivia within the Tennessee Blue Book. The bill, referred as "the Bible bill," immediately received controversy from both Democratic and Republican state politicians. Sexton's HB0615 was criticized by Republican Tennessee Attorney General Herbert Slatery, who stated in 2016 that the bill would violate the separation of church and state in the Establishment Clause of the Constitution of the United States and the Tennessee Constitution, thus making Sexton's bill unconstitutional. Following its narrow passage in both chambers of the Tennessee General Assembly, HB0615 would be vetoed by then Republican Tennessee Governor Bill Haslam, who saw the bill as a trivialization of the Bible.

=== 2017 ===
Sexton heatedly opposed a proposed 2017 increase on diesel and gasoline state fuel taxes that redirected over $200 million of tax revenue towards transportation infrastructure projects in Tennessee.

=== 2018 ===
Sexton introduced legislation for the creation of the Tennessee Monument to Unborn Children, with Southerland sponsoring it in the Senate.

=== 2019 ===
Sexton and Tennessee State Senator Mark Pody of Lebanon, introduced the "Tennessee Natural Marriage Defense Act" in their respective legislative chambers during February 2019. The anti-LGBT bill would have barred the permitting of same-sex marriage in Tennessee. The bill aimed to "defend natural marriage," and recognize the ruling of pro-LGBT legislature and legal decisions, including the United States Supreme Court's ruling in favor of Obergefell v. Hodges, as "void, and of no effect," in an attempt to override them.

=== 2020 ===
Sexton resurrected his "Bible bill" in February 2020 as HB2778 but the bill again failed within the Tennessee House of Representatives.

During the beginning of the COVID-19 pandemic, Sexton was able to secure a no-bid $165,000 state government contract in April 2020 that was let out by the Office of Tennessee Governor Bill Lee to purchase hospital gowns manufactured by Sexton Furniture LLC, his main business. Fellow legislators saw complications with the contract, citing the Sexton Furniture price per gown was almost double to similar products available from other vendors, along with the apparent conflict of interest on buying COVID-19 personal protection materials from a current elected member serving within the Tennessee General Assembly.

==== Nathan Bedford Forrest bust controversy ====
Sexton voted as a member of the House Naming, Designating, & Private Acts Committee on June 9, 2020, against the relocation of a prominently displayed bust displayed at the second floor of the Tennessee General Assembly building honoring the Confederate Army Lt. General and inaugural Ku Klux Klan Grand Wizard Nathan Bedford Forrest, into the nearby Tennessee State Museum for public display.

During the discussion of the bill regarding the removal of the bust, Sexton received heavy criticism from fellow state representatives and social media for an allegedly racist statement he had made attempting to excuse the violent and racist actions of Forrest, stating:

It was not against the law to own slaves back then. Who knows, maybe some of us will be slaves one of these days. Laws change.

— Jerry Sexton

=== 2021 and 2022 ===
Along with 29 other Republican members of the Tennessee General Assembly. Sexton signed a January 5, 2021 letter to the United States Congress supporting Donald Trump's attempts to overturn the 2020 United States presidential election. After losing to challenger Joe Biden, Trump falsely claimed election fraud and maneuvered to remain in power.

Sexton introduced legislation that would bar abortion by permitting "a man to seek an injunction that would legally prohibit a woman from terminating her pregnancy."

In March 2021, Sexton said of diversity and inclusion initiatives "goes against our people, and our culture."

In March 2021, Sexton filed his third legislative attempt to designate "the Bible" as "the official State book" and to list it in the official Tennessee Blue Book alongside other state symbols. The Tennessean noted that Sexton's repeated efforts to designate the Bible as the official state book "have elicited groans and eye rolls from his fellow Republicans, as well as impassioned arguments by Democrats against designating any official religious book for the state." Tennessee Lt. Governor Randy McNally, who is the president of the state senate, signed on as a sponsor of Sexton's "Bible bill" in 2021, although he opposed Sexton's previous "Bible bills" and took no action to move the bill through the Senate. It was suggested that McNally's sponsorship was a way kill the bill by not allowing it to through Senate committees.

In 2022, Sexton castigated school librarians and sponsored legislation that would require schools to provide a list of all school library materials to a politically appointed Tennessee textbook commission. Sexton's bill would empower the commission to order the removal of books from library shelves. Amid the debate, Sexton suggested that books banned by a state commission should be burnt.

== Personal life ==
Jerry Sexton is married to Marsha Sexton and they have two adult children, Terri and Matthew and many grandchildren.

Sexton is a member of Noeton Missionary Baptist Church in Bean Station, Tennessee where he formerly served as a pastor for twenty-five years.

Sexton is the owner of Sexton Furniture Manufacturing, LLC 1988, Bushline, Inc. (since 2017) and, Grainger Roadway Logistics, LLC. Sexton Furniture makes furniture for the retail trade, the OEM (original equipment manufacturer) market, the home-healthcare industry (e.g. power-lift chairs), the hospitality trade, the medical trade, and the college trade (i.e.: outfitting dorm rooms and lobbies), while Bushline manufactures furniture primarily for both the retail and the rent-to-own markets. Grainger Roadway Logistics is a trucking firm.
