= Clinch Mountain =

Mountain ridge in Tennessee and Virginia, United States

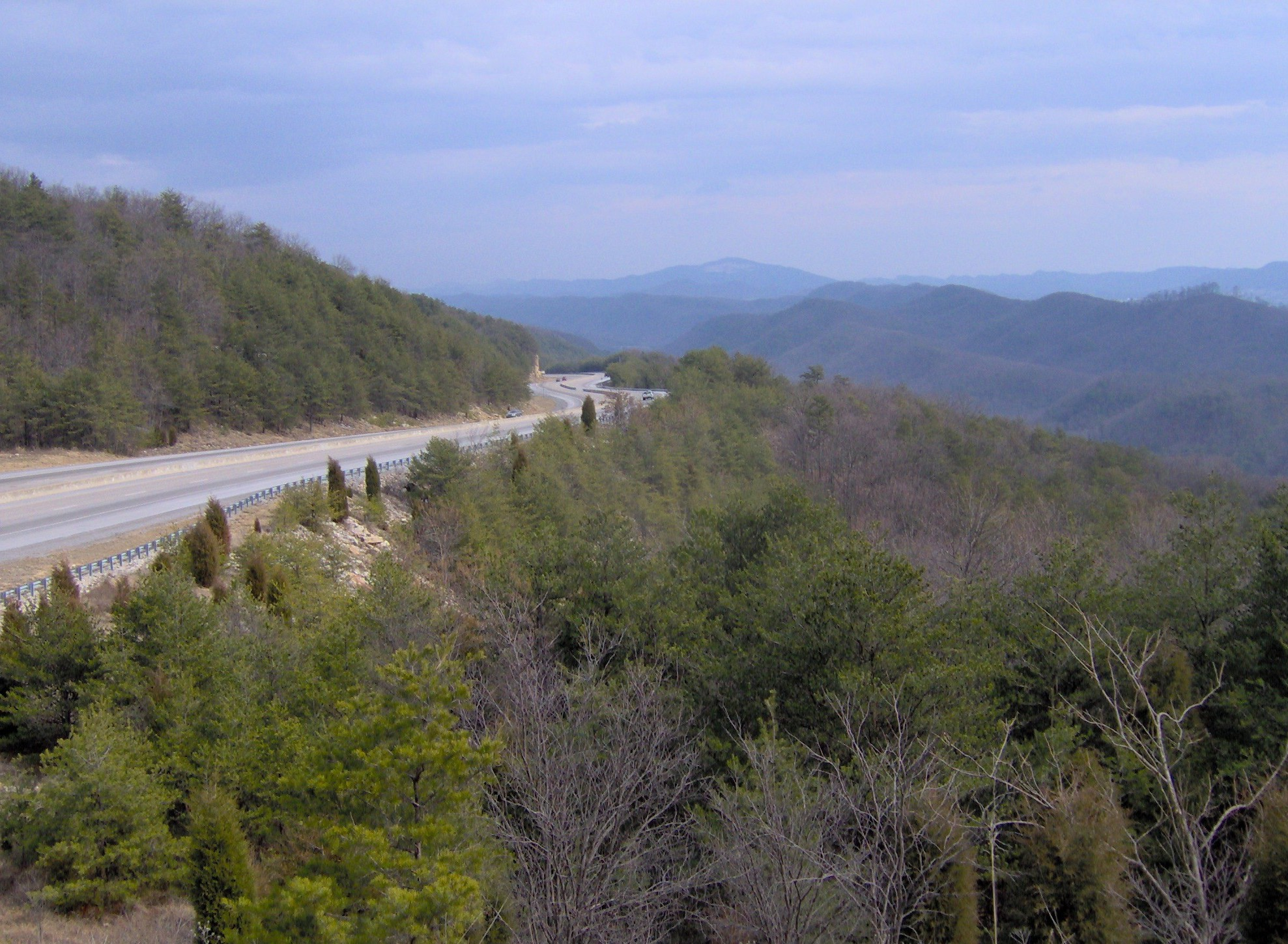
- U.S. Route 25 on Clinch Mountain, c. 2008

Highest point
- Elevation: 4,689 ft (1,429 m)(Beartown Mountain summit)
- Coordinates: 36°26′N 82°58′W

Geography
- Location within the United States Location within Tennessee
- Location: Tennessee and Virginia, U.S.
- Parent range: Appalachian Mountains, Ridge-and-valley Appalachians

Climbing
- First ascent: 1775 by Daniel Boone and William Bean
- Easiest route: US 25E/SR 32 in Grainger County, Tennessee

Clinch Mountain is a mountain ridge in the U.S. states of Tennessee and Virginia, located within the ridge-and-valley section of the Appalachian Mountains. The ridge runs generally east-northeasterly from its southern terminus at Kitts Point (at the intersection of Knox, Union, and Grainger counties near Blaine, Tennessee) to Garden Mountain near Burke's Garden, Virginia. It separates the Clinch River basin to the north and the Holston River basin to the south.

== Geography ==
Clinch Mountain is a long ridge, approximately 150 miles (240 km) in length, and is sometimes referred to as a mountain range or complex due to its size. It runs generally southwest to northeast, with many curves. Its north–south extent is 97 miles (156 km), and its east–west extent is 172 miles (277 km). The ridge includes the sub-range of Knob Mountain, as well as four summits above 4,000 feet (Beartown Mountain, Flattop Mountain, Morris Knob, and Chimney Rock Peak).

Clinch Mountain has only one true gap along its entire length, where the ridge is completely bisected, with Clinch Mountain continuing on either side. This gap, named Moccasin Gap, lies between Weber City and Gate City. The Norfolk Southern Railway and U.S. Highways 23-58-421 pass through this gap due to the lack of significant elevation change within it.

When U.S. Highway 25E was realigned into a four-lane highway northwest of Bean Station in the 1980s a new gap had to be cut into the top of Clinch Mountain, lowering the original gap elevation by 200 feet. This realignment, along with the lowering of Interstate 26-U.S. Highway 23 at Sam's Gap on the Tennessee-North Carolina border, are the only instances of a highway gap in Tennessee actually lowering an original gap where a state or federal highway was built through. (Sam's Gap was lowered by 150 feet to accommodate Interstate 26).

== History ==
Clinch Mountain is named after the Clinch River, which in turn was named after an 18th-century explorer. The earliest known reference to the name appears in the 18th-century journal of Thomas Walker: "Clinch's River, from one Clinch a hunter." The Wilderness Road to the Cumberland Gap crossed Clinch Mountain at Moccasin Gap.

Signal Point peak, near Kitts Point, the southern terminus of Clinch Mountain, was used to signal troops during the Civil War. The mountains along the Clinch Mountain ridge played an important role in the Battle of Bean's Station.

In the late 19th century, the mountains in Grainger County, Tennessee became known for their mineral springs, which attracted visitors from around the world. Tate Springs, the name of the town and resort, featured a hotel, golf course, and mineral baths. The seasonal resort even had its own spur on the railroad, allowing easy access for visitors from across the country. Notable guests included the Fords, Studebakers, Mellons, Firestones, and Rockefellers. Due to a fire and the Great Depression, only a few buildings remain today.

In the 1970s and 1980s, plans were proposed for a 75-mile-long hiking trail system called the Trail of the Lonesome Pine, which would run along the ridgeline of Clinch Mountain from the Tennessee-Virginia state line in Hancock County to its terminus in Grainger County. These plans were met with extreme opposition from unwilling property owners, particularly from Grainger County, as the project was nearing completion in the Hawkins and Hancock portions of the trail system. Due to the unwillingness of Grainger County property owners, the trail system was abandoned altogether in 1981, despite construction being completed outside of Grainger County.

== In popular culture ==
"Way Up on Clinch Mountain," a folk song based on a 17th-century Scottish ballad, was recorded by Woody Guthrie as "Rye Whiskey" and is included in Carl Sandburg's The American Songbag. Sandburg credited the song with inspiring the many "Bang Bang Lulu" variants. The Carter Family immortalized the American mountain in their 1928 song "My Clinch Mountain Home." A fiddle tune called "Clinch Mountain Backstep" (attributed to Ralph Stanley) is part of the Appalachian folk repertoire.

Liberty University in Lynchburg, Virginia, produced an original work in 2018 based on individuals and families from the area. Bloodroot: The Ballad of Clinch Mountain, created by the Women's Writing Project at Liberty, is based on actual events ranging from the 18th to the 20th century. Characters include Mary Draper Ingles, Orelena Hawks Puckett, the Carter family, and others.

== Crossings ==
The following crossings of Clinch Mountain can be made, from southwest to northeast:

Tennessee

- Joppa Mountain Road connects Joppa and Powder Springs via Powder Spring Gap.
- U.S. Route 25E (State Route 32) connects Tazewell and Bean Station via Bean Gap.
- State Route 31 connects Spruce Pine and Treadway via Flat Gap.
- State Route 66 connects Rogersville and Sneedville via Big War Gap.
- State Route 70 connects Alumwell and Eidson via Little War Gap.

Virginia

- The CSX Kingsport Subdivision connects Kermit and Speers Ferry via the Clinch Mountain Tunnel.
- U.S. Route 23/U.S. Route 58/U.S. Route 421 and the Norfolk Southern Railway Appalachia Division connect Weber City and Gate City via Moccasin Gap.
- State Route 612 connects Mendota and Collinwood via Fugate Gap.
- U.S. Route 19/U.S. Route 58 Alternate connects Holston and Hansonville via Little Moccasin Gap.
- State Route 80 connects the settlement of Hayters Gap and Rockdell via Hayters Gap.
- State Route 91 connects Tannersville and Maiden Spring via two-way mountain crossing in Tazewell County, Virginia.
- State Route 16 connects Asberrys and Benbow via Back of the Dragon Clinch Mountain Crossing in Tazewell County, Virginia.

== See also ==
- Clinch Mountain Boys
- Clinch Mountain Wildlife Management Area
- List of subranges of the Appalachian Mountains
