= Liberty Hill, Grainger County, Tennessee =

Liberty Hill, Tennessee
- Unincorporated community
- Location within Tennessee Location within the United States
- Coordinates: 36°19′03″N 83°36′52″W
- Country: United States
- State: Tennessee
- County: Grainger
- Elevation: 1,253 ft (382 m)
- Time zone: UTC-5 (Eastern (EST))
  - Summer (DST): UTC-4 (EDT)
- Area code: 865
- GNIS feature ID: 1291155

Liberty Hill is an unincorporated community in Grainger County, Tennessee, United States. Liberty Hill is 6.1 miles (9.8 km) west-northwest of Rutledge.
