= Dennis Roach =

American politician

Member of the Tennessee House of Representatives from the 35th district
- In office January 1995 – January 2015
- Succeeded by: Jerry Sexton

Personal details
- Party: Republican

Dennis Edward Roach is an American politician and a former Republican member of the Tennessee House of Representatives representing District 35 from 1995 to 2015.

== Elections ==
- 2014 Roach was defeated in the August 7, 2014, Republican Primary by Grainger County businessman Jerry Sexton. Sexton won 4,570 votes, or 55 percent, compared to 3,687 votes for Rep. Roach, or 45 percent.
- 2012 Roach was unopposed for both the August 2, 2012 Republican Primary, winning with 3,921 votes, and the November 6, 2012 General election, winning with 14,864 votes.
- 1990s Roach was initially elected in the 1994 Republican Primary and the November 8, 1994 General election and re-elected in the November 5, 1996 General election.
- 1998 Roach was unopposed for both the August 6, 1998 Republican Primary, winning with 4,828 votes, and won the November 3, 1998 General election, winning with 6,026 votes.
- 2000 Roach was unopposed for both the August 3, 2000 Republican Primary, winning with 1,228 votes, and the November 7, 2000 General election, winning with 14,736 votes.
- 2002 Roach was unopposed for the August 1, 2002 Republican Primary, winning with 4,452 votes, and won the three-way November 5, 2002 General election, winning with 20,961 votes (57.5%) against Democratic nominee Daniel Dykes and Independent candidate Sue Renfro Kurtz.
- 2004 Roach was challenged in the three-way August 5, 2004 Republican Primary, winning with 2,816 votes (69.7%), and won the November 2, 2004 General election with 12,046 votes (63.8%) against Democratic nominee Bill Howerton.
- 2006 Roach was challenged in the three-way August 3, 2006 Republican Primary, winning with 3,909 votes (59.0%), and won the November 7, 2006 General election with 9,867 votes (69.0%) against Independent candidate Ed Baldwin.
- 2008 Roach was unopposed for the August 7, 2008 Republican Primary, winning with 2,145 votes. Returning 2006 challenger Ed Baldwin ran as an Independent, setting up a rematch; Roach won the November 4, 2008 General election with 13,630 votes (71.7%) against Baldwin.
- 2010 Roach was unopposed for both the August 5, 2010 Republican Primary, winning with 6,607 votes, and the November 2, 2010 General election, winning with 9,981 votes.
