= Tennessee Blue Book =

Government manual for Tennessee

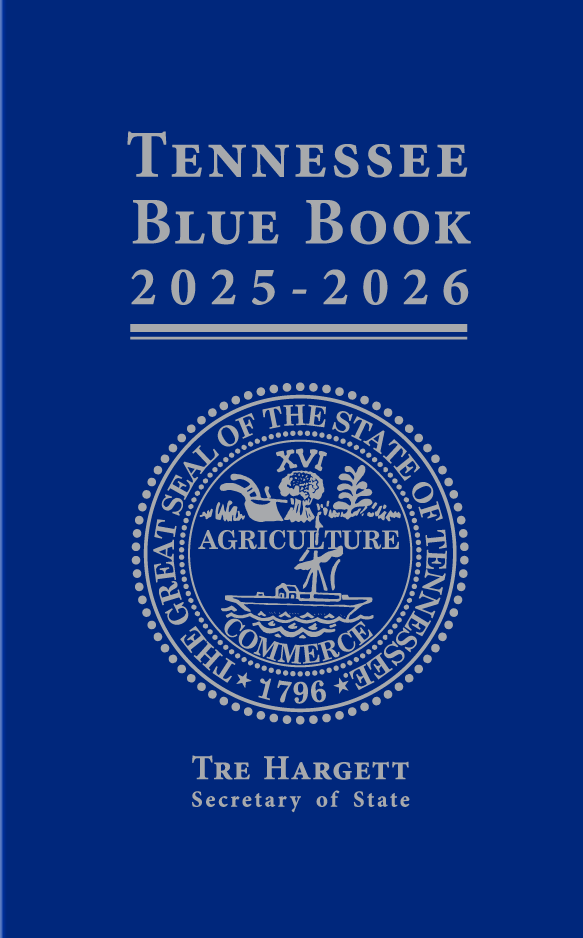
The cover of the 2025-26 Tennessee Blue Book

The Tennessee Blue Book is an official government manual for the U.S. state of Tennessee, published by the Secretary of State of Tennessee.

The Blue Book is typically published on a biennial basis. Its contents include details on the organization of the government of Tennessee, maps of Congressional districts, state Senate districts, state House districts, and listings of other facts, such as which counties are joined together in judicial districts, and the composition of certain governmental boards and how their members are appointed.

Additionally, thumbnail biographies of most senior state officials and all past governors are included, as well as a brief history of the state, and the text of the Tennessee State Constitution and the United States Constitution. The Blue Book is a fairly reliable source of information about Tennessee governmental officials.
