= Grainger High School =

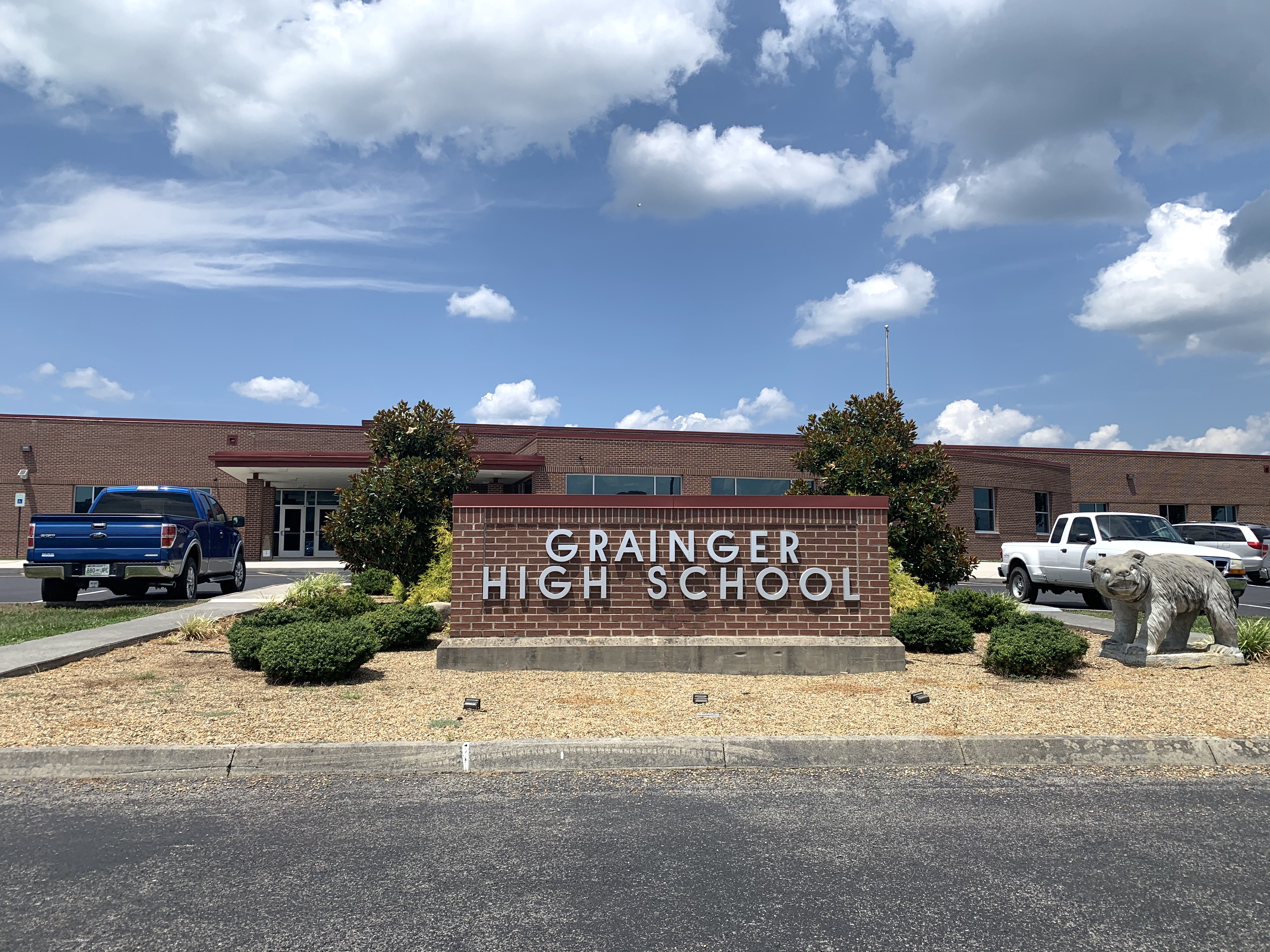

Location
- 2201 Highway 11W South; Rutledge, Tennessee 37861; United States
- 36.308071°N 83.445153°W

Information
- Other name: GHS
- Type: Public high school
- Established: 2008
- School district: Grainger County Schools
- NCES School ID: 470144000437
- Principal: Mark Briscoe
- Teaching staff: 53.00 (on an FTE basis)
- Grades: 9–12
- Enrollment: 797 (2023–2024)
- Student to teacher ratio: 15.04
- Colors: Orange, navy, white
- Nickname: Grizzlies
- Website: graingerhigh.grainger.k12.tn.us

Grainger High School (GHS) is a public high school in Rutledge, Tennessee, United States. It was established in 2008 and is part of the Grainger County Schools district. The school serves the communities of Rutledge, Bean Station, Blaine, and Washburn, and is the largest school in Grainger County.

== History ==
Grainger High School was built in 2008, replacing the old Rutledge High School, which was then repurposed as a middle school. The architect was the Lewis Group of Knoxville, and the contractor was Merit Company of Knoxville, with HVAC geothermal heating and cooling system provided by Griffith Engineering of Jefferson City.

The 175,000 square foot facility also has additional space in a field house, and was built to accommodate 1,200 students in grades 9 though 12. The project was financed by $3 million from the school fund and $24 million in bonds. A 12-cent increase in property taxes passed to support operating expenses.

ProPublica reported the racial composition of the school is 93% white, 5% hispanic, and 1% black.

== Curriculum ==
Graduation requirements include coursework in mathematics, science, English, physical education, personal finance, foreign language, fine arts, and electives. Approximately 1% of students enroll in Advanced Placement coursework.

In February 2020, the Grainger County Board of Education partnered with the school's agriculture department, allocating $250,000 to purchase 50 acres on the east side of the school to support the agriculture program. Instructor Daryl Morgan said, "The courses we offer in small animal science, livestock management, we would have the opportunity to possibly offer equine science... We also have the opportunity to offer small animal and veterinary science. We do not have any way to have animals. That will be our primary focus with this property. However, that property does have some woods that enable us to have forestry, have a wildlife curriculum to expand for students of our school."

== Athletics ==
The Tennessee Secondary Schools Athletic Association reports Grainger High School has sports teams for baseball, softball, football, boys' and girls' basketball, boys' and girls' cross country, boys' and girls' golf, boys' and girls' track and field, and boys' and girls' soccer.

The school's AJROTC program participates in Air Rifle competitions.
