= Morristown metropolitan area =

Metropolitan area based in Morristown, Tennessee, United States

The Lakeway Area
- Metropolitan area
- Morristown, TN MSA
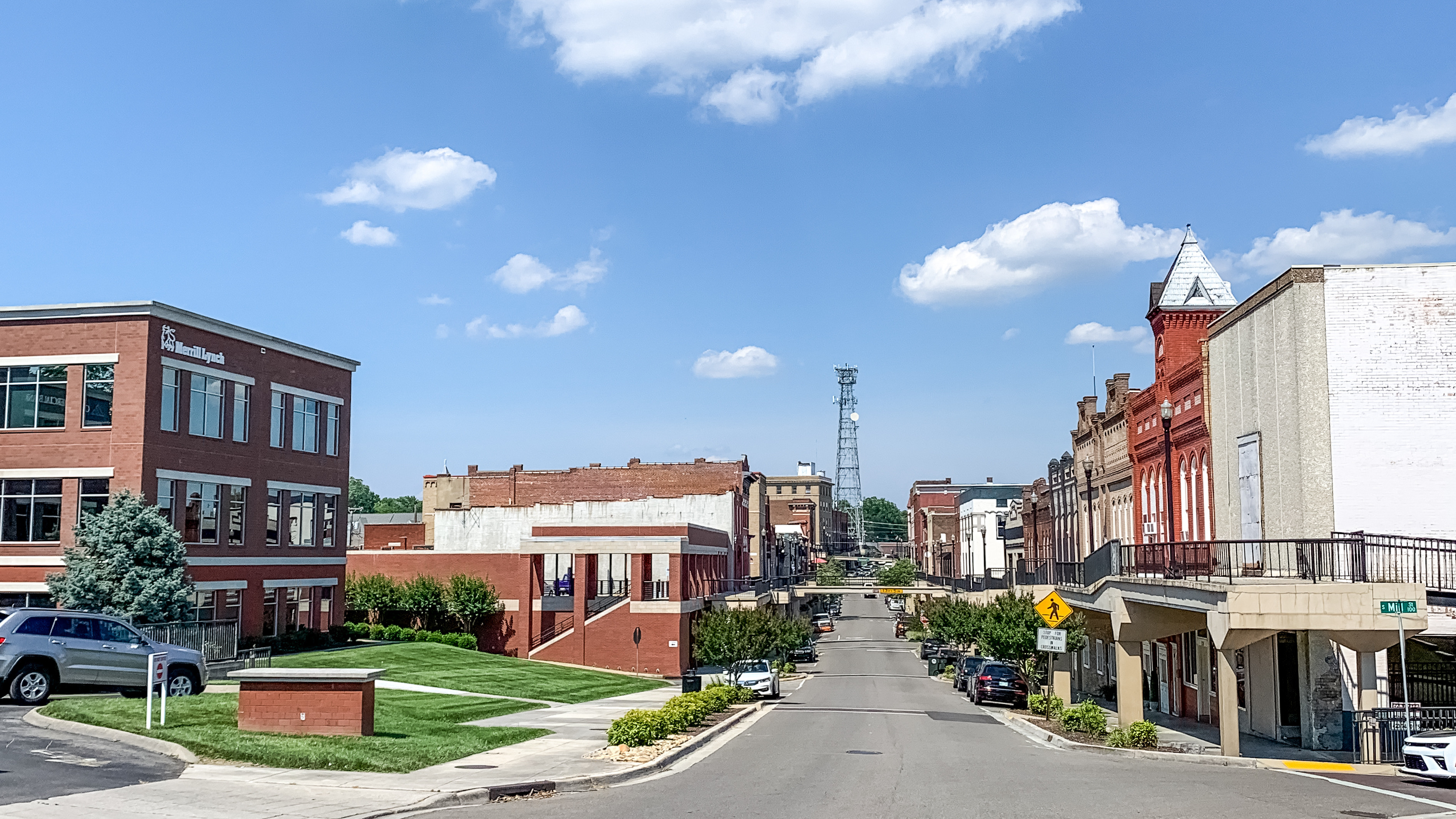
- Downtown Morristown skyline

- Logo

- Morristown Metropolitan Statistical Area
- Country: United States
- State: Tennessee
- Principal city: Morristown
- Other cities: Jefferson City

Population (2020)
  - Total: 142,709 (292nd)
- Time zone: UTC−5 (Eastern Time Zone (EST))
  - Summer (DST): UTC−4 (EDT)
- Area codes: 423, 865

The Morristown Metropolitan Statistical Area, commonly known as the Lakeway Area, as defined by the United States Census Bureau, is an area consisting of two counties - Hamblen, and Jefferson - in eastern Tennessee, anchored by the city of Morristown. Grainger County was formerly part of both the Knoxville and Morristown Metropolitans until 2023. Including Grainger County, the 2020 census showed that the MSA had a population of 142,709.

The MSA is also a component of the Knoxville-Morristown-Sevierville Combined Statistical Area.

The metropolitan area formerly included Grainger County until it was removed in 2023 and added to the Knoxville MSA.

== Counties ==
- Hamblen
- Jefferson

== Communities ==
- Baneberry
- Chestnut Hill (unincorporated)
- Dandridge
- Jefferson City
- Morristown (Principal city)
- New Market
- Russellville (unincorporated)
- Strawberry Plains (unincorporated; partial)
- Talbott (unincorporated)
- White Pine
- Whitesburg (unincorporated)

== Demographics ==
As of the census of 2000, there were 123,081 people, 48,636 households, and 35,364 families residing within the MSA. The racial makeup of the MSA was 93.79% White, 2.84% African American, 0.24% Native American, 0.38% Asian, 0.05% Pacific Islander, 1.86% from other races, and 0.85% from two or more races. Hispanic or Latino of any race were 3.34% of the population.

The median income for a household in the MSA was $31,057, and the median income for a family was $37,007. Males had a median income of $28,304 versus $20,329 for females. The per capita income for the MSA was $16,353. As of April 2009, the Morristown metropolitan area had the highest unemployment rate of any metropolitan area in Tennessee, with an unemployment rate of 12.3% (the state unemployment rate was 9.7%).

== See also ==
- Tennessee census statistical areas
- List of cities and towns in Tennessee
