= Powder Springs, Tennessee =

- Unincorporated community
- Powder Springs
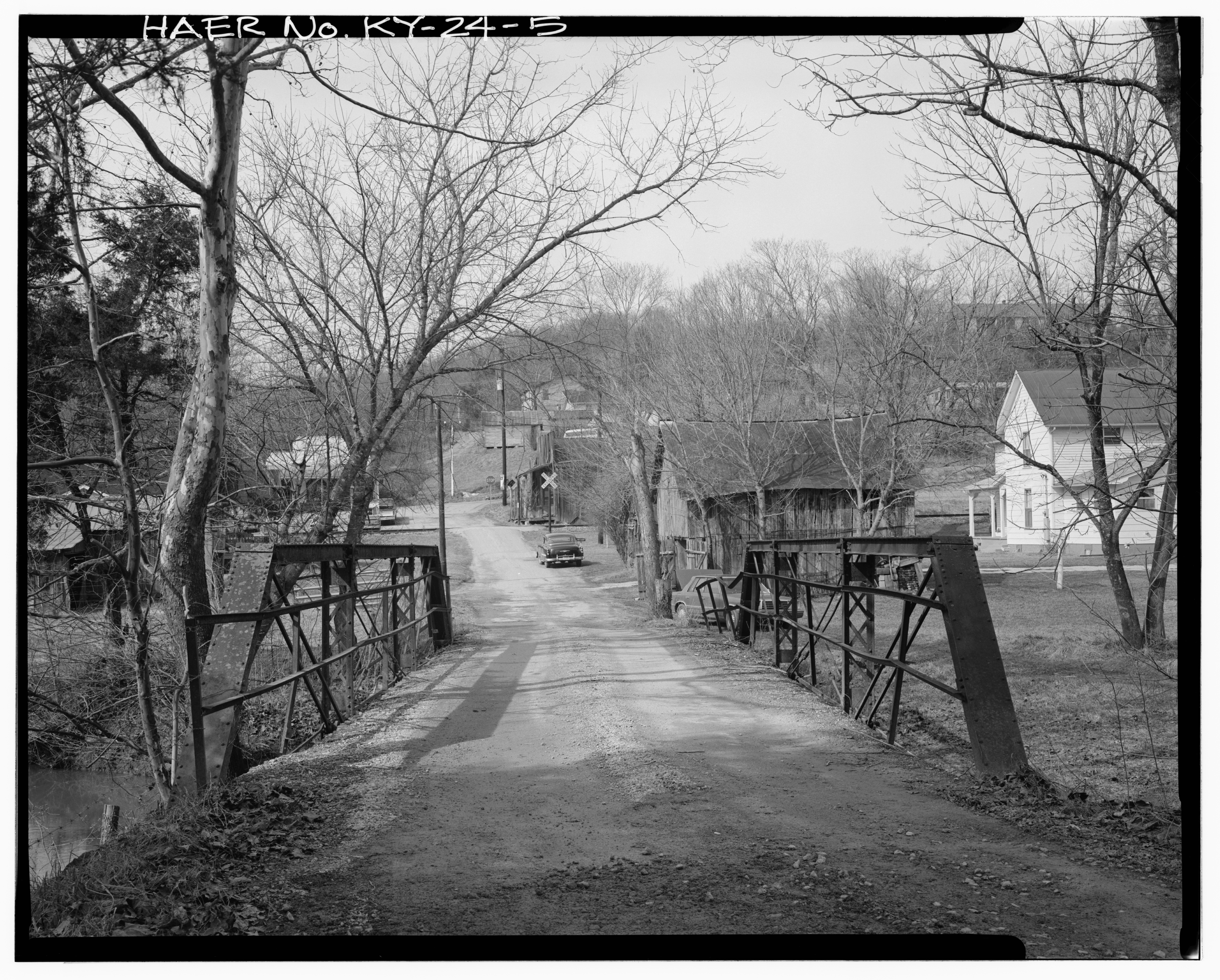
- Powder Springs, circa 1986

- Location within Tennessee Location within the United States
- Coordinates: 36°15′13″N 83°40′11″W
- Country: United States
- State: Tennessee
- County: Grainger
- Elevation: 1,217 ft (371 m)
- Time zone: UTC-5 (Eastern (EST))
  - Summer (DST): UTC-4 (EDT)
- ZIP code: 37848, 37888
- Area code: 865
- GNIS feature ID: 1298387

Powder Springs is an unincorporated community in Grainger County, Tennessee, United States. The earliest documentation of the area comes from a post office named Powder Springs Gap Powder Springs is the location of Carmeuse Luttrell Operation, and the site of several creeks and ponds. Average temperature range from 85° F in summer to 48° F in winter
