= Grainger County, Tennessee =

County in Tennessee, United States

- County
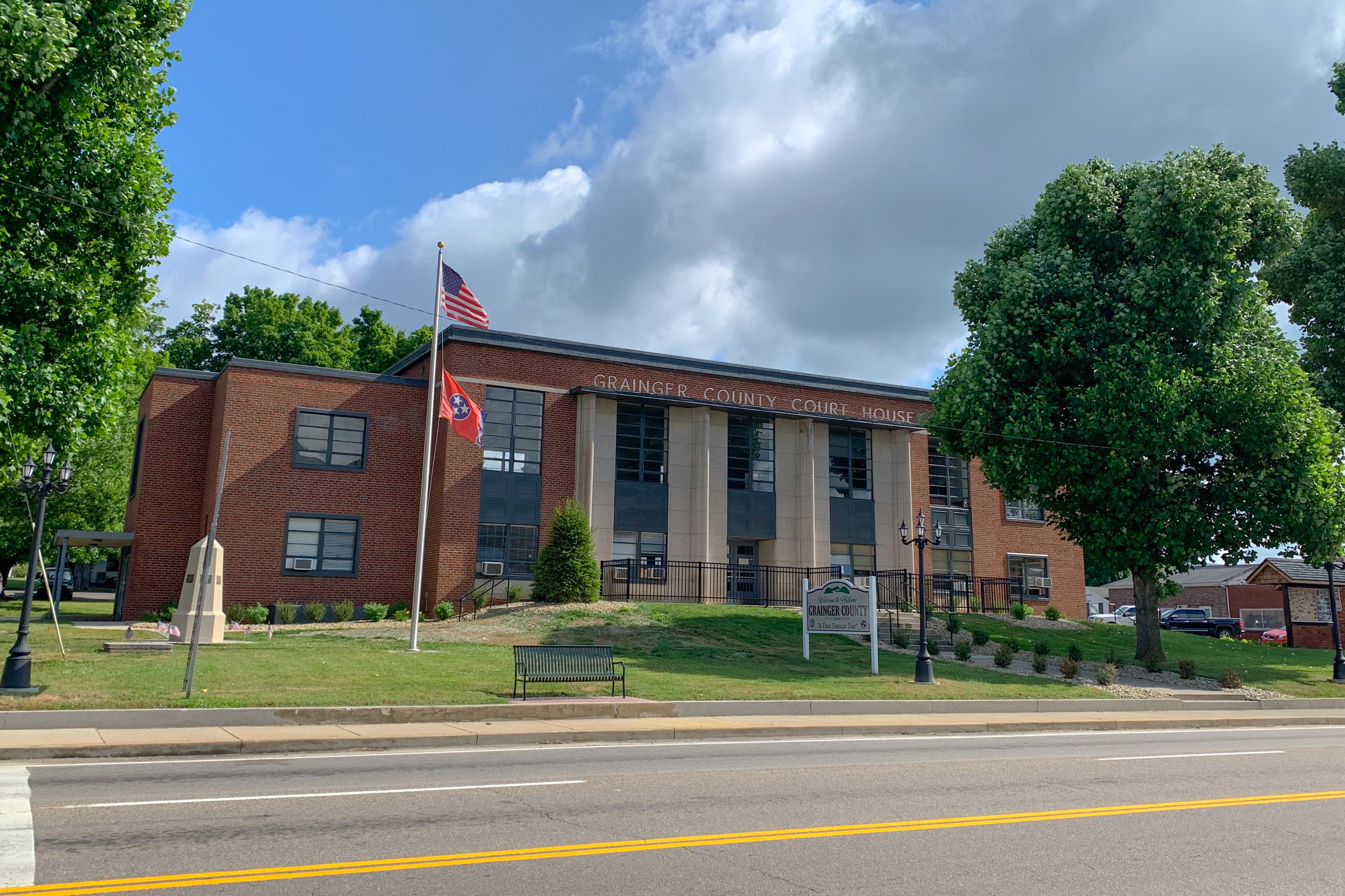
- Grainger County Courthouse in Rutledge

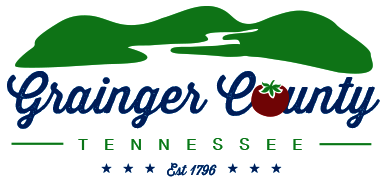
- Seal Logo
- Motto(s): Commerce, Agriculture, Recreation
- Location within the U.S. state of Tennessee
- Coordinates: 36°17′N 83°31′W
- Country: United States
- State: Tennessee
- Founded: 1796
- Named for: Mary Grainger Blount
- Seat: Rutledge
- Largest town: Bean Station

Government
  - Mayor: Mike Byrd (R)

Area
  - Total: 302 sq mi (780 km^{2})
  - Land: 281 sq mi (730 km^{2})
  - Water: 22 sq mi (57 km^{2}) 7.2%

Population (2020)
  - Total: 23,527
  - Estimate (2025): 25,739 ▲
  - Density: 81/sq mi (31/km^{2})
- Demonym: Grainger Countian
- Time zone: UTC−5 (Eastern)
  - Summer (DST): UTC−4 (EDT)
- ZIP Codes: 37708, 37709, 37848, 37861, 37881, 37888
- Area code: 865
- Congressional district: 2nd
- Website: www.graingercountytn.com

Grainger County is a county located in the U.S. state of Tennessee. As of the 2020 census, the population was 23,527. Its county seat is Rutledge. Grainger County is a part of the Knoxville metropolitan area and formerly the Morristown metropolitan area until 2023.

== History ==
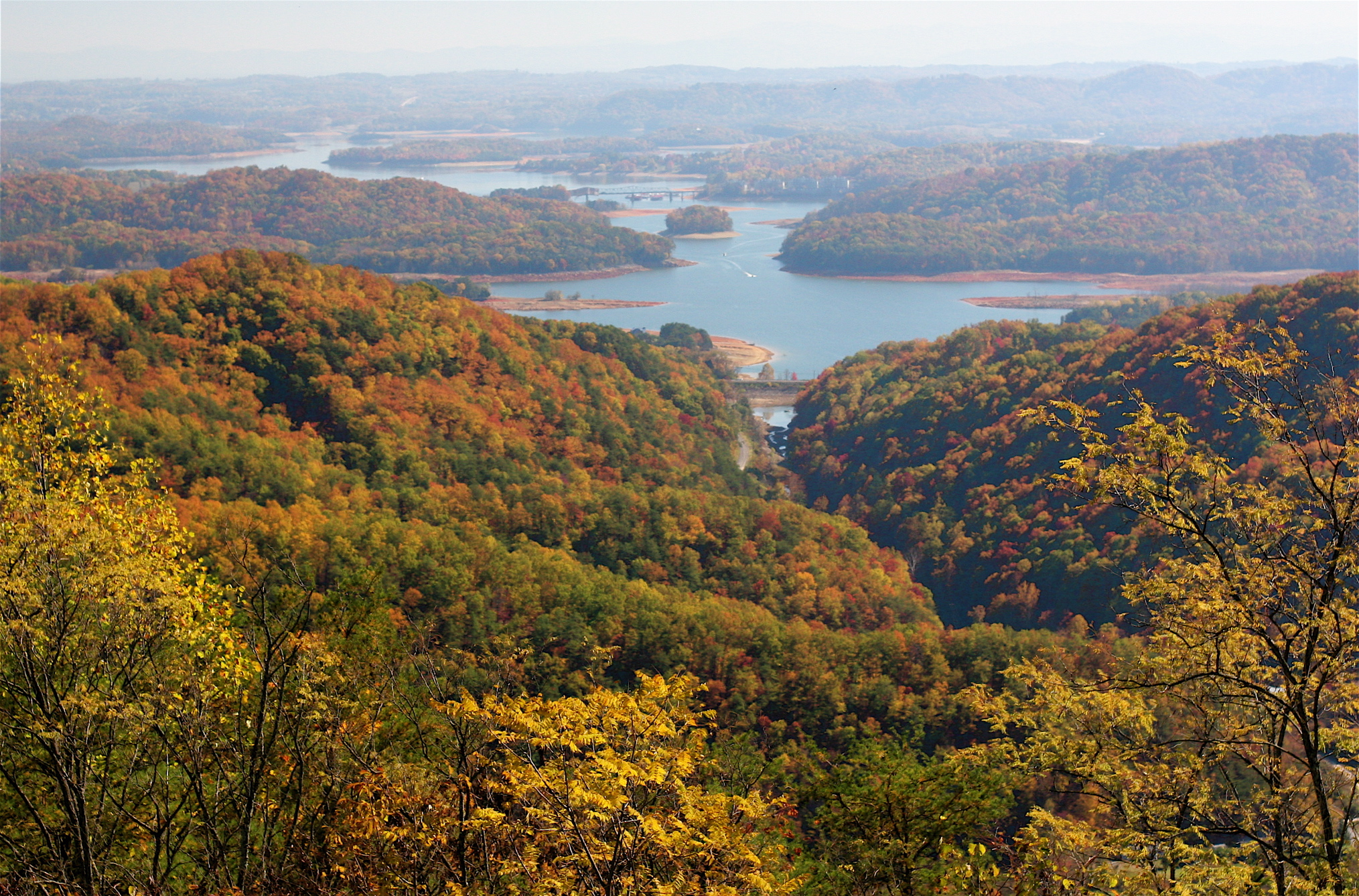
View of Cherokee Lake from Bean's Gap atop Clinch Mountain, the site of which longhunters would cross along the Wilderness Road into present-day Grainger County.

=== Early years ===
In 1775, pioneers Daniel Boone and William Bean had first observed the Holston River valley in Grainger County after crossing the gap at Clinch Mountain during a long hunting excursion. After fighting in the American Revolutionary War one year later, Bean was awarded 3,000 acres (12 km^{2}) in the area he previously surveyed for settlement during his excursion with Boone. Bean would later construct a four-room cabin at this site, which served as his family's home, and as an inn for prospective settlers, fur traders, and longhunters.

Grainger County would be established into a county from Knox and Hawkins counties by the North Carolina state legislature on April 22, 1796, the year Tennessee became the sixteenth state of the United States. It is named for Mary Grainger Blount, the wife of William Blount, making it the only county in Tennessee named for a woman. In 1801, Rutledge was selected as the county seat. Anderson, Claiborne, Campbell, Hamblen, Hancock, Scott and Union counties were formed from portions of the original Grainger County following its reduction in land size between 1801 and 1870.

=== Civil War ===
Like its surrounding East Tennessee counties, Grainger County was generally opposed to secession from the Union. In Tennessee's Ordinance of Secession referendum on June 8, 1861, sparsely populated Grainger County voters rejected secession by 1,756 to 495.

During the American Civil War, a state of near-guerrilla warfare brought economic, political, and social chaos to Grainger County, notably during the Knoxville campaign. Two arguments occurred within the county during the Civil War, with the first as a skirmish in Blaine around Christmas of 1862. In the year ahead, the Battle of Bean's Station pitted the forces of Confederate General James Longstreet against a Union forces under General James Shackelford in a planned surprise attack that failed for Confederate forces through the critically poor decision-making of Longstreet's staff. While the Battle of Bean's Station proved victorious for Longstreet in the end, he later failed to capture Knoxville westward through Blaine, and went into hiding in Russellville in nearby Hamblen County.

=== 1900s to present day ===
In the post-Civil War era, a businessman named Samuel Tate constructed a large Victorian-style luxury hotel just west of Bean Station that became the main focus of a resort known as Tate Springs. Around the late 1870s, the hotel was purchased by Captain Thomas Tomlinson, who would transform the property into a vast resort that advertised the supposed healing powers of its mineral spring’s water. During its heyday, the resort complex included over three-dozen buildings, a 100-acre (40 ha) park, and an 18-hole golf course. The resort had attracted some of the wealthiest people in America during this time. The resort declined during the Great Depression, and the hotel and most of its outbuildings have since been demolished after a major fire damaged the main hotel structure. The Tate Springs Springhouse still stands just off U.S. Route 11W near Bean Station Elementary School.

In 1901, in the northern area of the county near Thorn Hill, a four-year conflict between two families, known locally as "The Battle of Thorn Hill," began following the murder of a prominent resident. The feud fueled acts of violence such as assassinations of prominent citizens and racially motivated murders against African Americans in public places and businesses.

During the early and mid 20th century, moonshining became popular and spread throughout many communities in the county.

After the creation of the Tennessee Valley Authority in the 1930s, many Grainger County residents had to be relocated for the construction of both Cherokee and Norris Dam in the southern and northern parts of the county. Bean Station experienced most of this loss, as the original site the town now resides in the Cherokee Lake basin. Of the 875 families relocated for the Cherokee Project, 434 or 49.6% were from Grainger County.

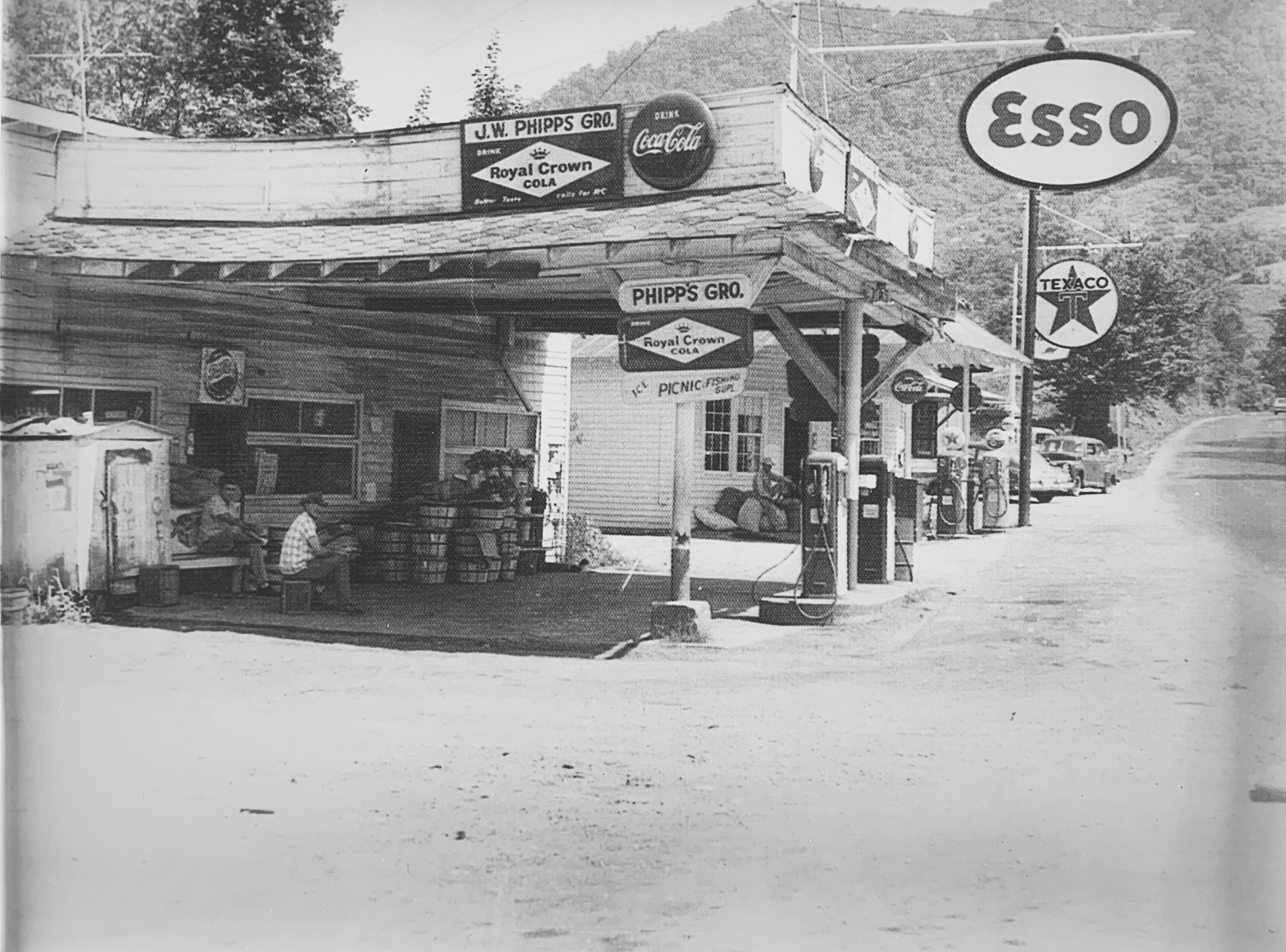
General store in Thorn Hill circa 1940s

In 1946, Grainger County suffered the loss of its third courthouse in Rutledge to a massive fire. However, most records, including those dating back to the county's establishment in 1796 were safe inside steel fireproof safes.

In the 1970s through the 1980s, plans for a 75-mile-long hiking trail system known as the Trail of the Lonesome Pine were proposed to run along the ridgeline of Clinch Mountain from the Tennessee-Virginia state line in Hancock County to its terminus in the city of Blaine in Grainger County. The plans were met with extreme opposition from unwilling property owners, particularly those from Grainger County, as the project would be nearly complete in the Hawkins and Hancock portions of the trail system. With the unwillingness from Grainger County property owners, the trail system would be abandoned all-together in 1981 despite the completion of construction outside of Grainger County.

On May 13, 1972, 14 people were killed in a head-on collision between a Greyhound double-decker bus and a tractor-trailer hauling carpet on U.S. Route 11W in the Bean Station area of the county, making it the deadliest automobile accident of its time in Tennessee. This infamous crash, along with several other fatal crashes along the narrow two-lane stretch of U.S. Route 11W in Grainger County, gave it the nickname "Bloody Highway 11W."

On July 4, 2012, Grainger County received national attention when 10-year-old Noah Winstead and his friend, 11-year old Nate Lynam, were electrocuted due to frayed wiring being in contact with the water the boys were swimming near a Cherokee Lake marina in the German Creek area of the county. In the aftermath of the tragedy, Tennessee legislators passed the Noah and Nate Act, which required marinas to be routinely inspected safety hazards such as faulty wiring and dangerous equipment operations.

On April 5, 2018, Southeastern Provisions, a cattle slaughterhouse in the county, was raided by U.S. Immigration and Customs Enforcement (ICE); 11 workers were arrested and 86 more were detained, all of whom were suspected of residing in the United States unlawfully. At the time, the raid was reportedly the largest workplace raid in United States history. In September 2018, the owner of the meatpacking facility was found guilty of multiple state and federal crimes, including tax evasion, wire fraud, contamination of local water supply, employing undocumented immigrants not authorized to work in the US, and other numerous workplace violations.

== Geography ==
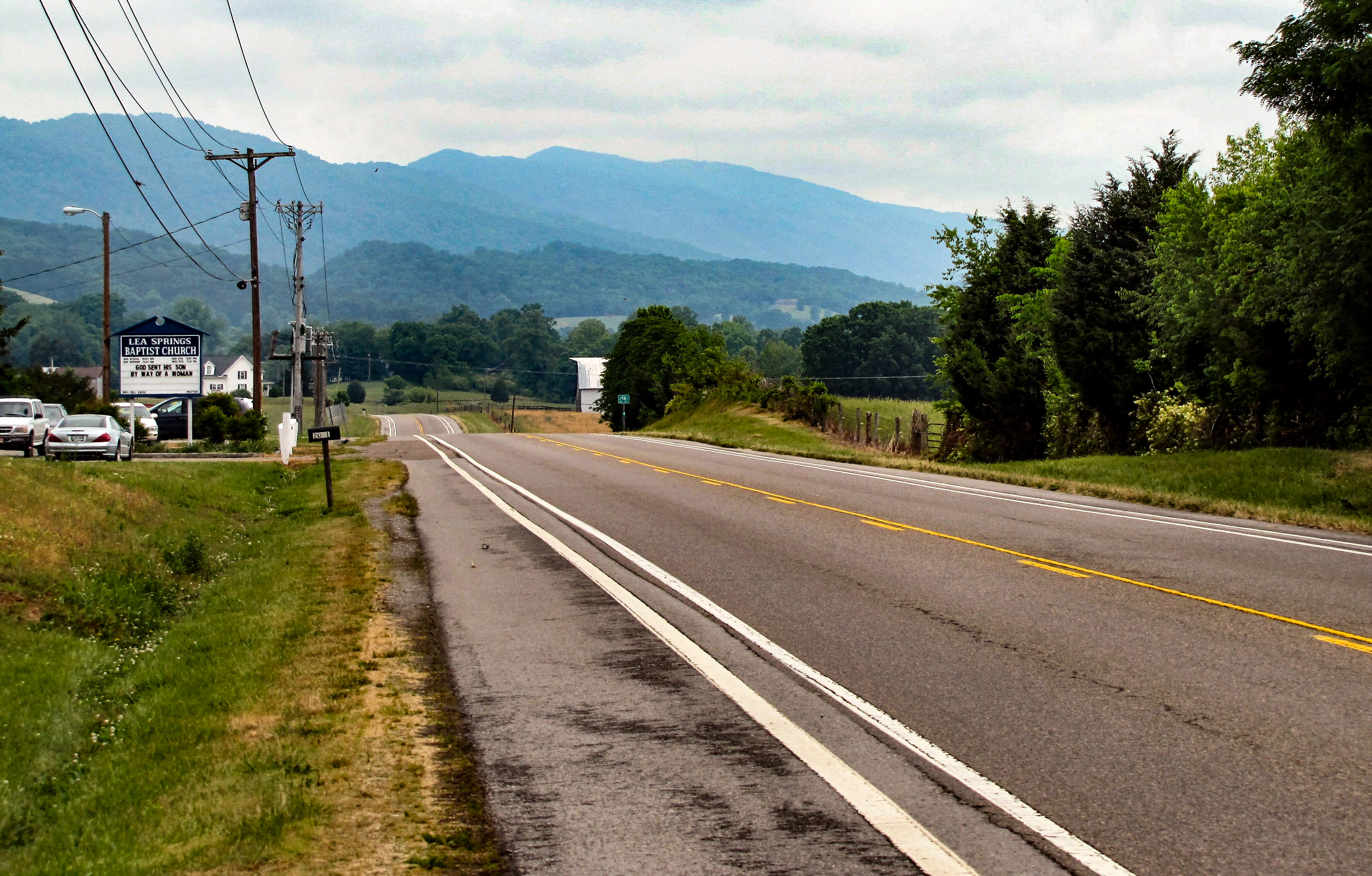
US-11W near Blaine, with the Clinch Mountain range rising in the distance

According to the U.S. Census Bureau, the county has a total area of 302 square miles (780 km^{2}), of which 281 square miles (730 km^{2}) is land and 22 square miles (57 km^{2}) (7.2%) is water. Grainger County is bounded on the northwest by the Clinch River (impounded by Norris Dam to form Norris Lake) and on the southeast by the Holston River and Cherokee Lake.

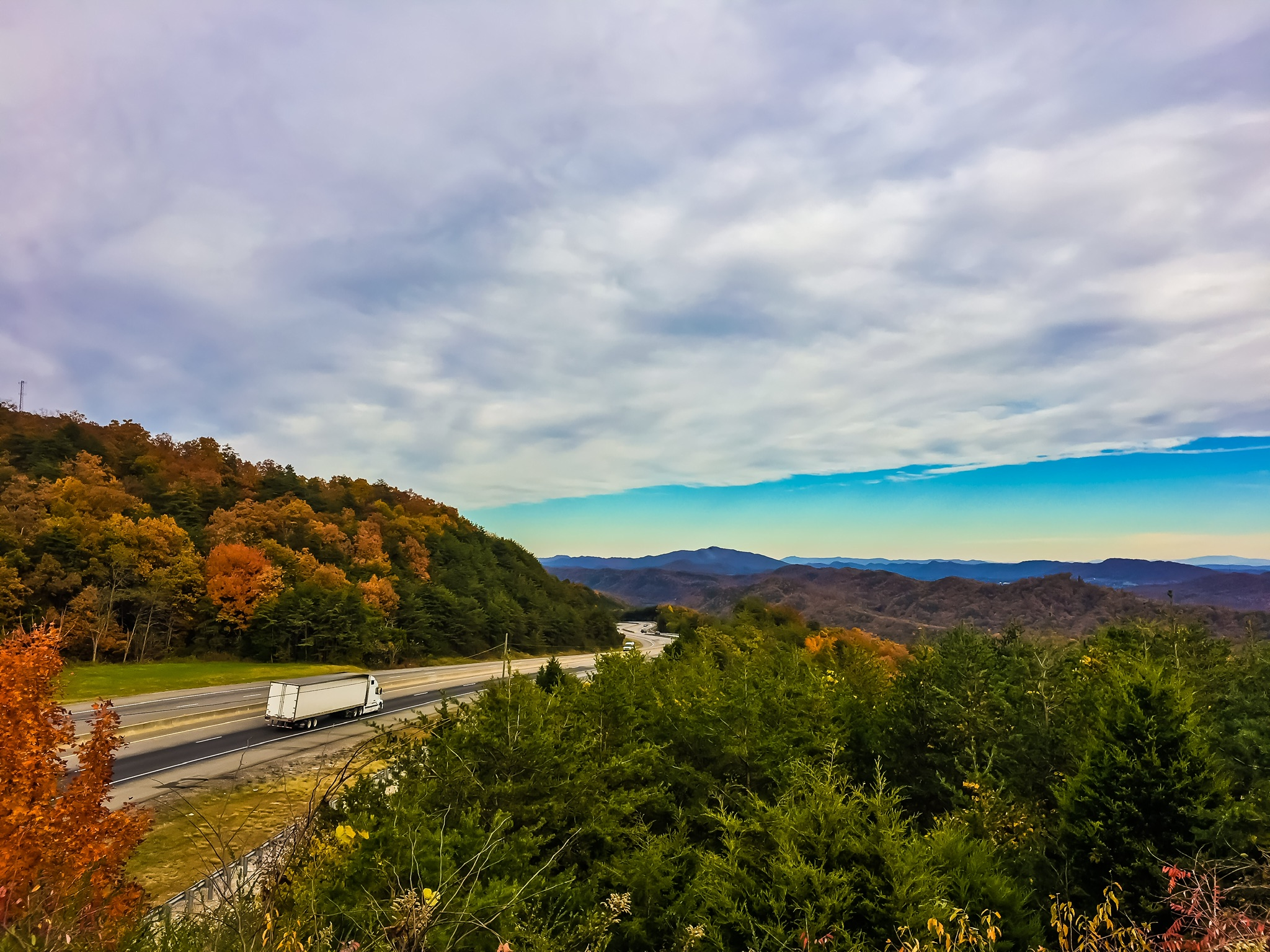
U.S. Route 25E descending the south slope of Clinch Mountain towards Bean Station

Clinch Mountain is a major geographic feature that effectively separates the county into a southern section (including Bean Station, Blaine, Joppa, and Rutledge) and a northern section (including the communities of Washburn, Powder Springs, and Thorn Hill).

=== Indian Cave ===
Indian Cave is a historic site located on the Holston River near present-day Blaine. The cave was used for centuries before Europeans entered the area, as indigenous peoples settled in the area in roughly 1000 AD. Remains of cane torches and other artifacts located in the cave indicate use by prehistoric indigenous peoples. The Iroquoian-speaking Cherokee migrated into the area from the northeast, making the eastern Ohio River valley and Appalachians down into South Carolina their historic territory.

In the 1700s, a Cherokee village was located just west of the main cave entrance, before the people were pushed out by encroaching Anglo-American settlers. The Donelson Party passed the Indian Cave entrance on their way down the Holston River in 1779 to settle present-day Nashville, Tennessee. In the years after the American Revolutionary War, the number of settlers continued to increase. Under the Indian Removal Act of 1830, Congress authorized the president to remove the Indians from the Southeast to territory west of the Mississippi River.

Robert Hoke, a former Confederate general from North Carolina, purchased the cave on July 21, 1869, as one of his business enterprises after the American Civil War. He had it mined for bat guano, a valuable natural fertilizer.

Area businessmen formed the Indian Cave Park Association on January 4, 1916, to develop the cave as a commercial attraction, as was being done for other caves throughout the Great Smoky Mountains. The Association did not open the cave officially to the public until May 30, 1924.

On November 18, 2000, over 800 people from all over the United States attended an all-night dance party known as the "Rave in a Cave" in Indian Cave. The party lured many of its attendees via Internet advertisements. 22 arrests on drug charges were made and one party-goer died of a drug overdose. On the day of the party, nearby residents attempted to block access into the cave, leading to physical action by the attendees with baseball bats. Officials from the Grainger County sheriff's department had set up a road block to prevent further confrontations between county residents and the party attendees. Over 150 traffic citations were also filed as well.

The cave is not open to visitors and is closed to the public as of 2005.

=== Joppa Mountain ===
Summit of Joppa Mountain

Joppa Mountain is located along the Clinch Mountain ridge in central Grainger County in the unincorporated community of Joppa. Buzzard Rock is the summit of the mountain at an elevation of 2,530 feet (770 m) above sea level, making it one of the highest points in Grainger County. At this summit, the neighboring U.S. states of Georgia, Kentucky, North Carolina, and Virginia can be seen, along with the Cumberland Gap and the Great Smoky Mountains range, on a clear day.

Hang gliding from Joppa Mountain was a pastime of many hang gliding enthusiasts around the United States and the world. Hang gliding on Joppa Mountain gained momentum in the mid-1970s and enjoyed considerable popularity until the late 1980s.

As of the present day, Buzzard Rock is inaccessible to hang gliders and hikers alike due to the property being closed to the public since the 1990s.

=== Waterways ===
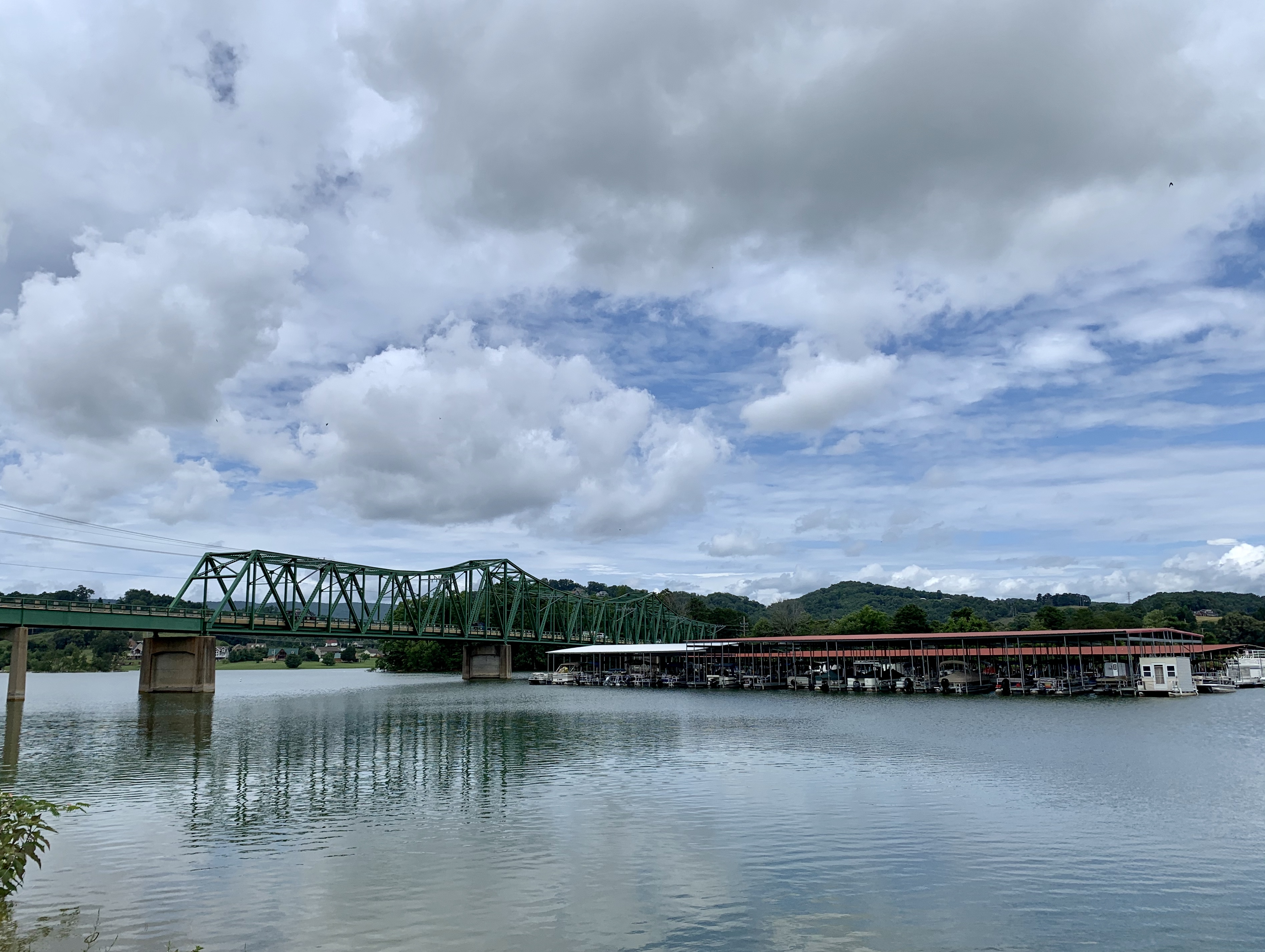
Marina adjacent to German Creek Bridge on Cherokee Lake

The main source of water in Grainger County is man-made Cherokee Lake. Cherokee Lake was created during the 1940s as part of the Tennessee Valley Authority’s hydroelectric revitalization project. The lake is fed by multiple sources, including a series of natural creeks and runoff waters. The lake begins with its first source at Poor Valley Creek in Hawkins County, extends through Grainger County and neighboring Hamblen and Jefferson counties. Cherokee Lake ends at Cherokee Dam where the water is drained into the Holston River along the Grainger/Jefferson border. In total, Cherokee Lake has 28,780 acres of surface area and extends for 400 miles of shoreline.

The Holston River below Cherokee Dam continues southwestward along the Grainger/Jefferson border passing the communities of New Corinth, Richland, and Blaine, then crossing into Knox County, with the confluence with the French Broad River in Knoxville, forming the Tennessee River.

In the northern part of the county, the Clinch River passes through Thorn Hill near the tri-border of Claiborne, Hancock and Grainger counties. The river then traverses northwestward along the Grainger/Claiborne border, flowing into the basin of Norris Lake north of Washburn and Liberty Hill. In total, Norris Lake has 33,840 acres of surface area and extends for 809 miles of shoreline that Grainger shares with Union, Claiborne, Campbell, and Anderson counties.

=== Adjacent counties ===
- Claiborne County (north)
- Hancock County (northeast)
- Hawkins County (northeast)
- Hamblen County (east)
- Jefferson County (south)
- Knox County (southwest)
- Union County (west)

=== State protected areas ===
- Buffalo Springs Wildlife Management Area
- Johnson Ridge Small Wildlife Area
- TVA Noeton Resource Management Area

== Demographics ==
Historical population
Census	Pop.	Note	%±
1800	7,367		—
1810	6,397		−13.2%
1820	7,651		19.6%
1830	10,066		31.6%
1840	10,572		5.0%
1850	12,370		17.0%
1860	10,962		−11.4%
1870	12,421		13.3%
1880	12,384		−0.3%
1890	13,196		6.6%
1900	15,512		17.6%
1910	13,888		−10.5%
1920	13,369		−3.7%
1930	12,737		−4.7%
1940	14,356		12.7%
1950	13,086		−8.8%
1960	12,506		−4.4%
1970	13,948		11.5%
1980	16,751		20.1%
1990	17,095		2.1%
2000	20,659		20.8%
2010	22,657		9.7%
2020	23,527		3.8%
2025 (est.)	25,739	▲	9.4%
U.S. Decennial Census; 1790-1960 1900-1990; 1990-2000 2010-2014

=== Racial and ethnic composition ===
Grainger County, Tennessee – Racial and ethnic composition Note: the US Census treats Hispanic/Latino as an ethnic category. This table excludes Latinos from the racial categories and assigns them to a separate category. Hispanics/Latinos may be of any race.
Race / ethnicity (NH = Non-Hispanic)	Pop 1980	Pop 1990	Pop 2000	Pop 2010	Pop 2020	% 1980	% 1990	% 2000	% 2010	% 2020
White alone (NH)	16,483	16,902	20,189	21,753	21,748	98.40%	98.87%	97.72%	96.01%	92.44%
Black or African American alone (NH)	136	102	67	101	118	0.81%	0.60%	0.32%	0.45%	0.50%
Native American or Alaska Native alone (NH)	8	42	32	36	42	0.05%	0.25%	0.15%	0.16%	0.18%
Asian alone (NH)	2	8	18	24	53	0.01%	0.05%	0.09%	0.11%	0.23%
Native Hawaiian or Pacific Islander alone (NH)	x	x	5	3	2	x	x	0.02%	0.01%	0.01%
Other race alone (NH)	0	0	5	7	33	0.00%	0.00%	0.02%	0.03%	0.14%
Mixed race or Multiracial (NH)	x	x	117	203	758	x	x	0.57%	0.90%	3.22%
Hispanic or Latino (any race)	122	41	226	530	773	0.73%	0.24%	1.09%	2.34%	3.29%
Total	16,751	17,095	20,659	22,657	23,527	100.00%	100.00%	100.00%	100.00%	100.00%

=== 2020 census ===
As of the 2020 census, there were 23,527 people, 9,663 households, and 6,510 families residing in the county. The median age was 45.6 years, 20.5% of residents were under the age of 18, and 21.1% of residents were 65 years of age or older. For every 100 females there were 100.2 males, and for every 100 females age 18 and over there were 98.6 males age 18 and over.

The racial makeup of the county was 93.2% White, 0.5% Black or African American, 0.3% American Indian and Alaska Native, 0.2% Asian, <0.1% Native Hawaiian and Pacific Islander, 1.7% from some other race, and 4.0% from two or more races. Hispanic or Latino residents of any race comprised 3.3% of the population.

15.6% of residents lived in urban areas, while 84.4% lived in rural areas.

There were 9,663 households in the county, of which 27.1% had children under the age of 18 living in them. Of all households, 53.0% were married-couple households, 18.3% were households with a male householder and no spouse or partner present, and 22.6% were households with a female householder and no spouse or partner present. About 26.5% of all households were made up of individuals and 13.2% had someone living alone who was 65 years of age or older.

There were 11,644 housing units, of which 17.0% were vacant. Among occupied housing units, 79.6% were owner-occupied and 20.4% were renter-occupied. The homeowner vacancy rate was 1.2% and the rental vacancy rate was 6.5%.

=== 2000 census ===
As of the census of 2000, there were 20,659 people, 8,270 households, and 6,161 families residing in the county. The population density was 74 people per square mile (29 people/km^{2}). There were 9,732 housing units at an average density of 35 per square mile (14/km^{2}). The racial makeup of the county was 98.41% White, 0.32% Black or African American, 0.15% Native American, 0.09% Asian, 0.02% Pacific Islander, 0.40% from other races, and 0.61% from two or more races. 1.09% of the population were Hispanic or Latino of any race.

There were 8,270 households, out of which 31.40% had children under the age of 18 living with them, 61.90% were married couples living together, 8.80% had a female householder with no husband present, and 25.50% were non-families. 22.50% of all households were made up of individuals, and 9.10% had someone living alone who was 65 years of age or older. The average household size was 2.48 and the average family size was 2.89.

In the county, the population was spread out, with 22.90% under the age of 18, 8.20% from 18 to 24, 30.50% from 25 to 44, 25.80% from 45 to 64, and 12.50% who were 65 years of age or older. The median age was 38 years. For every 100 females, there were 99.00 males. For every 100 females age 18 and over, there were 96.50 males.

The median age of a resident in Grainger County is 44.2.

The median income for a household in the county was $27,997, and the median income for a family was $33,347. Males had a median income of $25,781 versus $19,410 for females. The per capita income for the county was $14,505. About 15.10% of families and 18.70% of the population were below the poverty line, including 22.40% of those under age 18 and 26.00% of those age 65 or over.

== Economy ==
=== Top employers ===
According to a data profile produced by the Tennessee Department of Economic and Community Development in 2018, the top employers in the county are:

#	Employer	# of Employees
1	Grainger County School District	500
2	Clayton Homes (Bean Station)	350
3	Grainger County	200
4	Clayton Homes (Rutledge)	200
5	Sexton Furniture Manufacturing LLC	150

=== Agriculture ===
Grainger County is acknowledged as a predominately rural and exurban county of the Greater Knoxville region. Agriculture has accounted for a large portion of the county economy throughout history due to the county's soil containing a mass amount of rich nutrients beneficial to select crops of choice. The tomato has been the major crop, though cattle raising continues to important gains. Grainger County tomatoes have in recent decades become nationally and internationally renowned.

In 2018, Grainger County was reported to have over 650 greenhouses, 923 farms producing 500 acres of field vegetables, and nearly 90,000 acres of farmland.

The county celebrates the tomato in an annual festival since 1992. Around thirty-thousand festival-goers across the state of Tennessee and the United States gather to witness events about the county's heritage and its significant agricultural impact across the state of Tennessee, enjoy live music performances, purchase local produce and handmade gifts, and take part in arts and crafts events. The Grainger County Tomato Festival takes place during the second to last weekend in July.

=== Real estate ===
Residential construction has been increasing in the county, with most occurring near the Cherokee Lake shoreline, the Bean Station area and the Blaine area. With a cost of living around $2,600, and an average housing cost of $420 monthly, it is one of the least expensive counties in Tennessee. In 2017, the median value of property in the county was $110,600, compared to $229,700 nationally.

=== Tourism and leisure ===
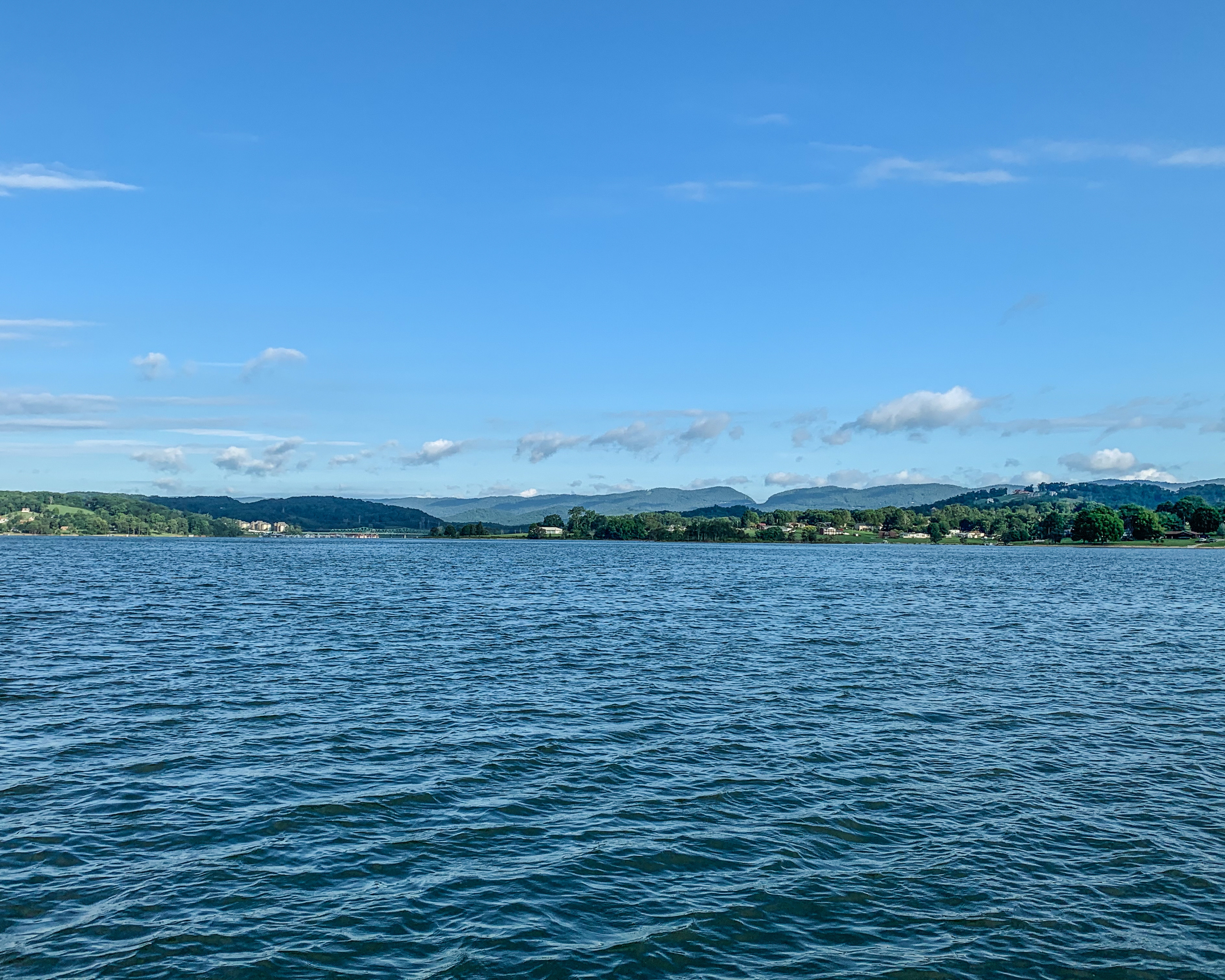
Cherokee Lake near Bean Station

By the late 19th century, a tourism industry had flourished around the mineral springs flowing from the Clinch Mountain range. The Tate Springs Resort complex located in the Bean Station region of the county, provided accommodations for tourists and business travelers alike until the Great Depression. It included mineral baths and waters, an enormous resort hotel, a swimming pool and bathhouse, a springhouse constructed as a gazebo, private cabins, and a golf course. After the Great Depression, the resort had closed and the property was given to local authorities. A children's home and school occupied the space of the hotel and cabins, until a major fire destroyed the entire hotel in the 1960s. Today, the Tate Springs Springhouse, the bathhouse, and several cabins are what remains of the complex.

Since the 1940s, the county's tourism and recreational industry nonetheless sparked once again after the Tennessee Valley Authority's creation of Cherokee and Norris Lake in the southern and northern parts of the county respectively. Fishing, hiking, hunting, camping, golf, boating, water sports, and development of lakefront property seek to continue contributing to the county's economy.

=== Industry and commerce ===
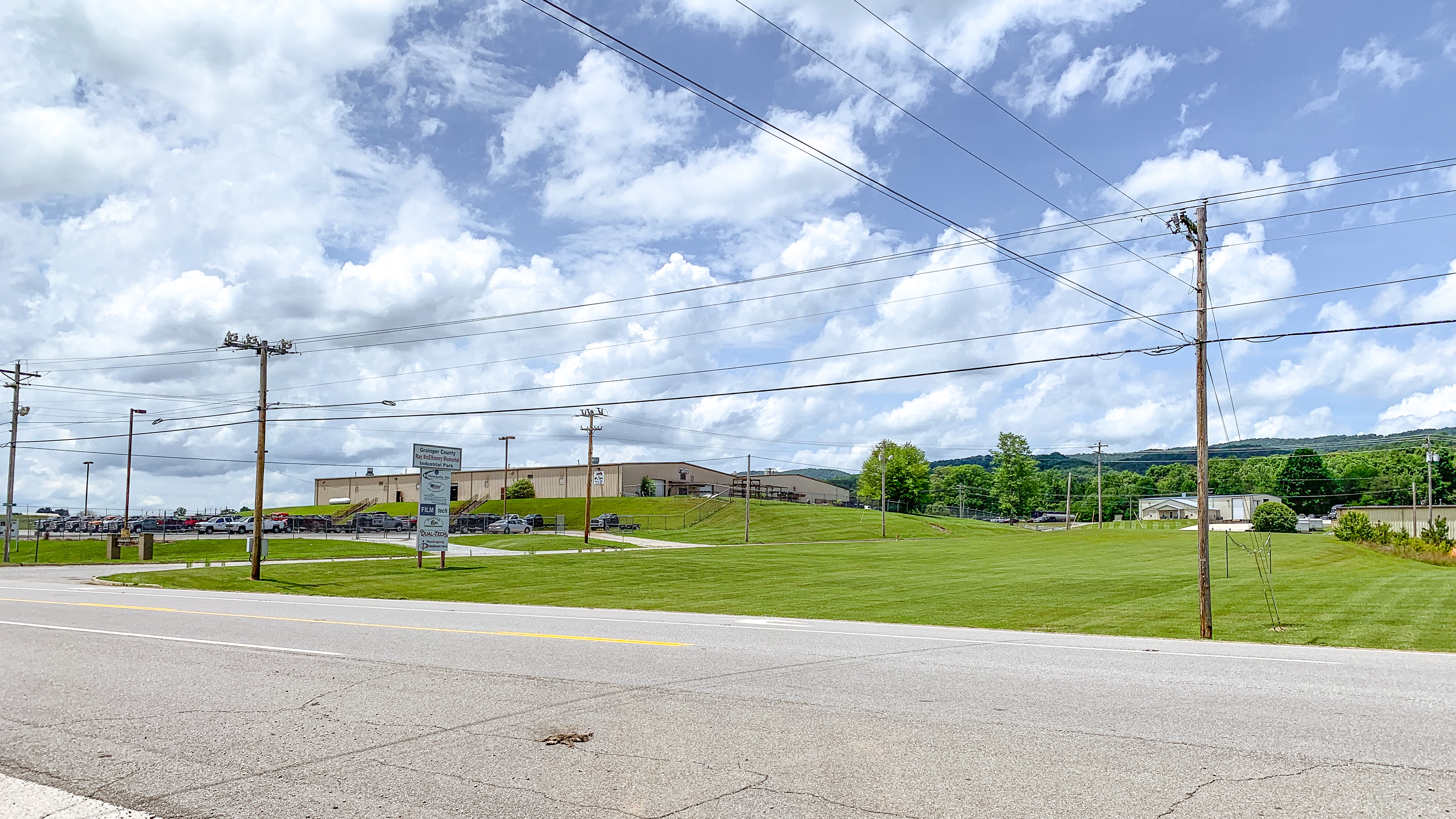
Grainger County Industrial Park, located between Rutledge and Bean Station

In the county's early years, small businesses represented the secondary source of economic development. Gristmills, hatters, saddle makers, tailors, lawyers, and dry goods merchants supplied the many necessities for the county's isolated and spread-out agricultural communities.

The Shields family operated Holston Paper Mill, one of the earliest industries in the county. The Knoxville and Bristol Railroad, also known as the Peavine Railroad, ran through the Richland Creek Valley from Bean Station to Blaine. The tracks would later succumb to flooding after the damming of the Richland Valley by the TVA in the 1940s.

Clinchdale Lumber Company, a locally owned business, logged a significant portion of the county's timber in the early part of the 20th century. Afterwards, this timbering movement gave way to knitting mills and zinc mining in the Clinch River Valley in the northern part of the county. Around the late 20th century, Tennessee marble was quarried in the Thorn Hill region of Grainger County.

=== Economic hardship ===
Unlike neighboring counties such as Jefferson, Hamblen, and Knox, Grainger County does not have county-wide zoning ordinances, which has led to the uncontrolled and controversial development of RV campgrounds in predominately residential areas.

In 2010, it was reported that nearly two-thirds of Grainger County residents commute to cities in surrounding counties such as Morristown and Knoxville for work. With this, Grainger County was reported as one of five counties in the East Tennessee Development District region experiencing significant out-migration of young college-educated adults leaving Grainger County for urban economic hubs such as Knoxville and Morristown, due to the lack of employment opportunities in the county.

In the fiscal year 2020, Grainger County was recognized as one of twenty-four counties in the state of Tennessee at risk of becoming economically distressed.

== Government and politics ==
=== Government ===
==== Executive branch ====
Office	Name	Party
County Mayor	Mike Byrd	Republican
Court Clerk	Sherry Clifton	Republican
County Clerk	Angie Lamb	Republican
Sheriff	James Harville	Republican
Assessor	Donna Shelton	Republican
Register of Deeds	Rick Diamond	Republican
Road Superintendent	Charlie McAnally	Republican
Trustee	Rena Greer	Republican

==== Legislative branch ====
Grainger County has 15 county commissioners, with voters electing three individuals to serve from each of its five electoral districts.

- District 1: Avondale & Rutledge
  - Wendy Noe (Rutledge)
  - Darell Stratton (Rutledge)
  - Scott Wynn (Rutledge)
- District 2: Bean Station & Rutledge
  - Johnny Baker (Rutledge)
  - Rodney Overbay (Bean Station)
  - Luke Stratton (Rutledge)
- District 3: Blaine, Joppa and Rutledge
  - Andy Cameron (Rutledge)
  - Leon Spoone (Rutledge)
  - Darrell Williams (Blaine)
- District 4: Powder Springs, Thorn Hill, & Washburn
  - James Acuff (Washburn)
  - Justin Epperson (Washburn)
  - Gary Dalton (Thorn Hill)
- District 5: Bean Station & Mary Chapel
  - Becky Johnson (Bean Station)
  - Larry Johnson (Bean Station)
  - Mike Holt (Bean Station)

==== School board ====
The county has ten school board members, with voters electing two individuals to serve from each of its five electoral districts.

== Communities ==
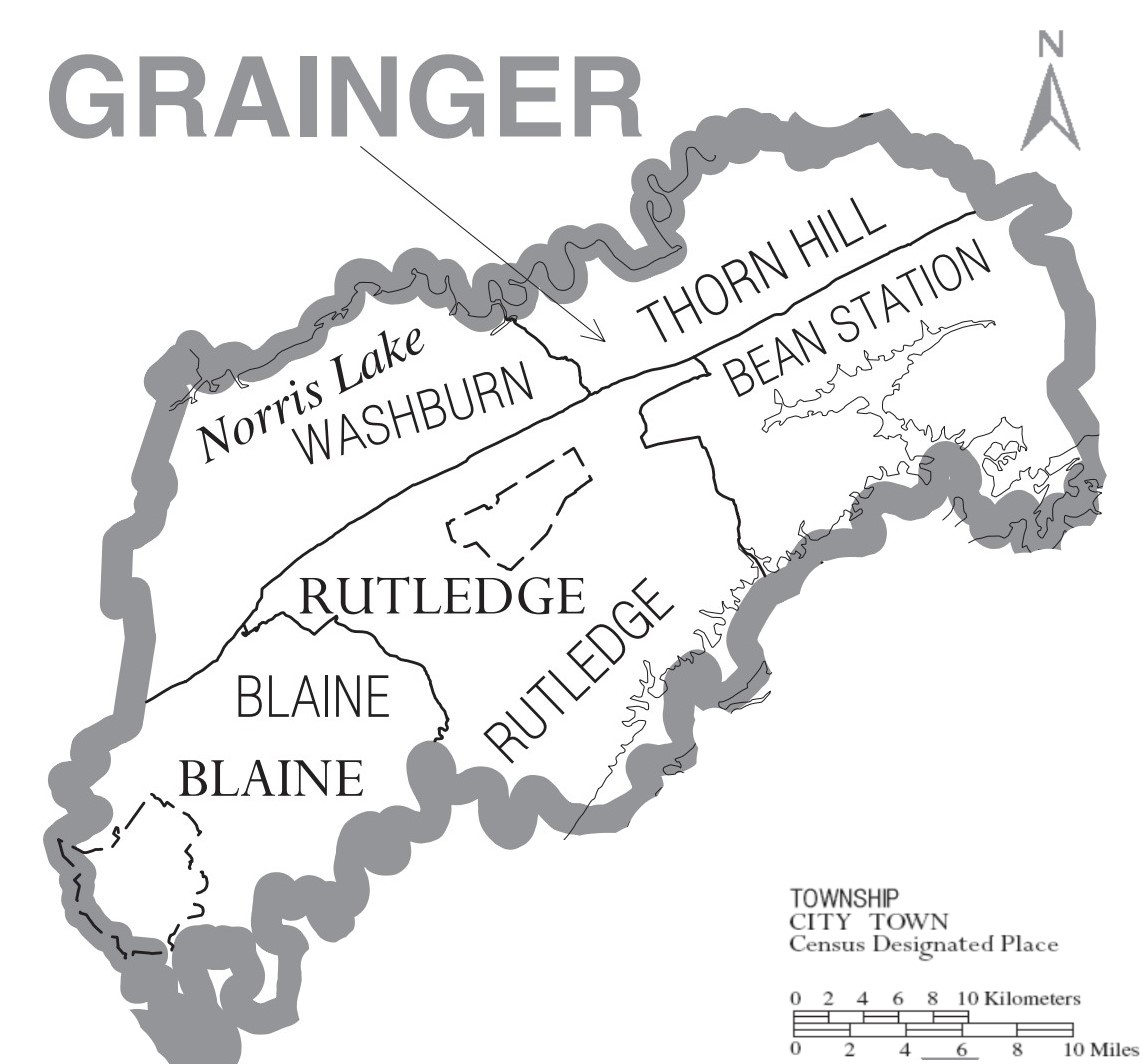
Map of Grainger County with municipal and county subdivision labels

=== Cities ===
- Blaine
- Rutledge (county seat)

=== Town ===
- Bean Station (small portion in Hawkins)

=== Unincorporated communities ===
- Beech Grove
- Cherokee
- Joppa
- Lea Springs
- Liberty Hill
- New Corinth
- Powder Springs
- Richland
- Tate Springs
- Thorn Hill
- Washburn

== Education ==
The Grainger County School district has one high school, one middle school, four elementary/intermediate schools, one primary school, one K-12 school, and one alternative-placement school. The Grainger County School district has 3,637 students enrolled.

=== Primary school ===
- Rutledge Primary School

=== Elementary schools ===
- Bean Station Elementary School
- Joppa Elementary School
- Rutledge Elementary School
- Washburn School

=== Middle school ===
- Rutledge Middle School

=== High schools ===
- Grainger High School
- Washburn School

=== Alternative school ===
- Grainger Academy

== Infrastructure ==
A report conducted by the Tennessee Advisory Commission on Intergovernmental Relations in 2018 found the top three infrastructure needs in Grainger County, with transportation at US$108 million, water and wastewater at US$11.4 million, and recreation US$1.7 million.

=== Transportation ===
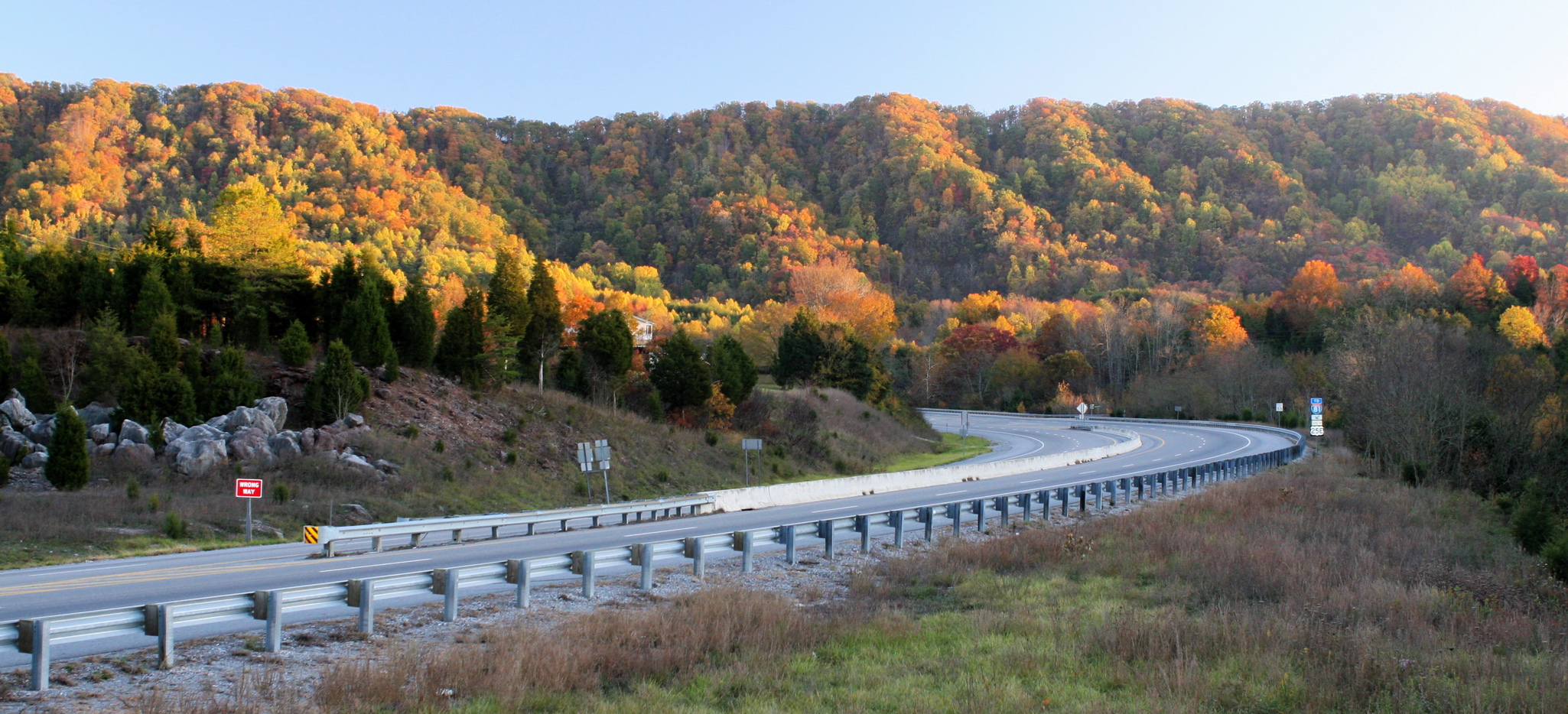
U.S. Route 25E in northern Grainger County near Thorn Hill

U.S. Routes 11W and 25E are the major arterial roadways in the county. US 25E, established as the East Tennessee Crossing Byway and Appalachian Development Corridor S, provides four-lane expressway north-south access to Hamblen and Claiborne counties. US 11W, established as Rutledge Pike and Memphis-to-Bristol Highway, provides four-lane expressway access in the municipalities of Bean Station and Blaine. The highway outside of these areas is two-lane.

State Routes 92, 131, 375 are the secondary roadways in the county. SR 92 provides two-lane access from Rutledge to the Jefferson County line near Cherokee Dam. SR 131 provides two-lane access to Union and Hancock counties, and the unincorporated communities of Washburn and Thorn Hill. SR 375, established as Lakeshore Drive, provides two-lane access along the northern shore of Cherokee Lake to SR 92 and US 25E.

=== Utilities ===
Cherokee Dam, a hydroelectric dam constructed by the Tennessee Valley Authority in the early 1940s, is located at the Grainger-Jefferson county line and provides electricity for the surrounding region. The billing and operation of the electrical system is provided by Appalachian Electric Cooperative (AEC), a municipal power company that serves southern Grainger County excluding Blaine. AEC also provides the option for fiber broadband access for the service area.

Bean Station Utility District, (BSUD), provides municipal water access for southeastern Grainger County including the municipalities of Rutledge and Bean Station.

Knoxville Utilities Board provides electricity to southwestern Grainger County including the city of Blaine and the community of Powder Springs. Luttrell-Blaine-Corryton Utility District (LBCUD) provides municipal water services to this same region. The municipalities of Rutledge, Blaine, and the county's industrial park have access to municipal sewage treatment systems. The eastern portion of the county, which is the most populated region, does not have access to a sewage treatment system.

== Politics ==
United States presidential election results for Grainger County, Tennessee
Year	Republican		Democratic		Third party(ies)	
Year	No.	%	No.	%	No.	%
1912	741	29.85%	841	33.88%	900	36.26%
1916	1,529	64.38%	843	35.49%	3	0.13%
1920	2,158	70.66%	895	29.31%	1	0.03%
1924	1,464	68.80%	651	30.59%	13	0.61%
1928	1,457	75.30%	466	24.08%	12	0.62%
1932	1,325	56.31%	995	42.29%	33	1.40%
1936	1,754	60.15%	1,153	39.54%	9	0.31%
1940	1,688	66.01%	842	32.93%	27	1.06%
1944	1,938	76.00%	605	23.73%	7	0.27%
1948	1,824	71.75%	644	25.33%	74	2.91%
1952	3,030	76.28%	937	23.59%	5	0.13%
1956	2,497	72.40%	913	26.47%	39	1.13%
1960	3,017	75.86%	939	23.61%	21	0.53%
1964	2,634	66.80%	1,309	33.20%	0	0.00%
1968	2,788	67.26%	761	18.36%	596	14.38%
1972	2,842	76.54%	828	22.30%	43	1.16%
1976	2,805	57.68%	2,018	41.50%	40	0.82%
1980	3,254	67.12%	1,495	30.84%	99	2.04%
1984	3,212	66.72%	1,565	32.51%	37	0.77%
1988	2,734	65.50%	1,423	34.09%	17	0.41%
1992	2,772	49.92%	2,242	40.37%	539	9.71%
1996	2,875	52.72%	2,162	39.65%	416	7.63%
2000	3,746	60.48%	2,361	38.12%	87	1.40%
2004	4,907	65.19%	2,569	34.13%	51	0.68%
2008	5,297	70.60%	2,066	27.54%	140	1.87%
2012	5,470	75.43%	1,668	23.00%	114	1.57%
2016	6,626	82.74%	1,154	14.41%	228	2.85%
2020	8,565	84.52%	1,467	14.48%	102	1.01%
2024	9,630	86.52%	1,432	12.87%	68	0.61%

Like all of East Tennessee, Grainger County has long been overwhelmingly Republican, due to its powerful Unionist sentiment during the Civil War. The last Democratic presidential candidate to ever carry Grainger County was Andrew Jackson in 1832. The Whig Party carried the county consistently between 1836 and 1852, and since the Republican Party first contested Tennessee in 1868, it has won Grainger County in every election except in 1912 when the GOP was mortally divided and Progressive Theodore Roosevelt carried the county over conservative incumbent William Howard Taft.

The county is very Republican even by East Tennessee standards, rejecting Democrats even in national Democratic landslides. It is one of the few counties where Franklin Delano Roosevelt was shut out in all four of his successful campaigns, and Lyndon Johnson lost the county by a nearly 2-to-1 margin in 1964. Bill Clinton is the only Democrat to come remotely close to carrying the county since 1912, losing by 9.6 percent in 1992 with native son Al Gore as his running mate. FDR, Jimmy Carter and Clinton were the only Democrats in the 20th century to manage even 40 percent of the county's vote.

The American Communities Project (ACP) characterized Grainger County as an 'evangelical hub,' due to the high number of religious residents tied to evangelical churches, particularly the Southern Baptist Convention, and the county is in one of the most politically conservative types of the ACP's characteristic placements.

In recent elections, the county has shown little competitiveness for Democratic candidates in local, state, and federal elections.

== See also ==
- National Register of Historic Places listings in Grainger County, Tennessee
