= National Register of Historic Places listings in Jefferson County, Tennessee =

Location of Jefferson County in Tennessee

This is a list of the National Register of Historic Places listings in Jefferson County, Tennessee.

This is intended to be a complete list of the properties and districts on the National Register of Historic Places in Jefferson County, Tennessee, United States. Latitude and longitude coordinates are provided for many National Register properties and districts; these locations may be seen together in a map.

There are 14 properties and districts listed on the National Register in the county.

See also National Register of Historic Places listings in Hamblen County, Tennessee for additional properties in White Pine, a city that spans the county line.

Contents: Counties in Tennessee
Anderson – Bedford – Benton – Bledsoe – Blount – Bradley – Campbell – Cannon – Carroll – Carter – Cheatham – Chester – Claiborne – Clay – Cocke – Coffee – Crockett – Cumberland – Davidson – Decatur – DeKalb – Dickson – Dyer – Fayette – Fentress – Franklin – Gibson – Giles – Grainger – Greene – Grundy – Hamblen – Hamilton – Hancock – Hardeman – Hardin – Hawkins – Haywood – Henderson – Henry – Hickman – Houston – Humphreys – Jackson – Jefferson – Johnson – Knox – Lake – Lauderdale – Lawrence – Lewis – Lincoln – Loudon – Macon – Madison – Marion – Marshall – Maury – McMinn – McNairy – Meigs – Monroe – Montgomery – Moore – Morgan – Obion – Overton – Perry – Pickett – Polk – Putnam – Rhea – Roane – Robertson – Rutherford – Scott – Sequatchie – Sevier – Shelby – Smith – Stewart – Sullivan – Sumner – Tipton – Trousdale – Unicoi – Union – Van Buren – Warren – Washington – Wayne – Weakley – White – Williamson – Wilson

This National Park Service list is complete through NPS recent listings posted March 21, 2025.

== Current listings ==
	Name on the Register	Image	Date listed	Location	City or town	Description
1	Branner-Hicks House	Branner-Hicks House	July 9, 1974 (#74001919)	East of Jefferson City on Chucky Rd. 36°07′36″N 83°28′33″W	Jefferson City	
2	Cherokee Hydroelectric Project	Cherokee Hydroelectric Project	August 11, 2017 (#100001468)	450 Powerhouse Rd. 36°09′58″N 83°29′54″W	Rutledge	
3	Christ Temple AME Zion Church	Christ Temple AME Zion Church	November 9, 2005 (#05001221)	235 E. Meeting St. 36°01′13″N 83°24′32″W	Dandridge	
4	Cox's Mill	Cox's Mill	January 27, 1983 (#83003041)	North of Jefferson City on Fielden's Store Rd. 36°09′24″N 83°31′34″W	Jefferson City	
5	Dandridge Historic District	Dandridge Historic District	January 22, 1973 (#73001792)	Town center around Main, Meeting, and Gay Sts. 36°01′00″N 83°24′53″W	Dandridge	
6	Fairfax	Fairfax	April 13, 1973 (#73001795)	Southeast of White Pine off U.S. Route 25E; 36°04′04″N 83°15′09″W	White Pine	Built by Lawson Franklin for his son, Isaac, in 1840
7	Fairvue	Fairvue	April 12, 1982 (#82003978)	Andrew Johnson Highway; 36°08′27″N 83°27′50″W	Jefferson City	
8	Lawson D. Franklin House	Lawson D. Franklin House	April 13, 1973 (#73001796)	Southeast of White Pine off U.S. Route 25E; 36°05′18″N 83°15′35″W	White Pine	Built in the 1830s by planter and entrepreneur Lawson D. Franklin; Franklin also built nearby Fairfax for his son, Isaac, and the Bleak House in Knoxville for his daughter, Louisa.
9	Glenmore	Glenmore	April 13, 1973 (#73001794)	Off U.S. Route 11E; 36°07′40″N 83°28′59″W	Jefferson City	
10	Hill-Hance House		August 26, 1982 (#82003977)	East of Chestnut Hill off U.S. Route 411; 35°56′28″N 83°18′30″W	Chestnut Hill	
11	Mossy Creek Presbyterian Church		November 6, 2024 (#100010996)	721 Church Street; 36°07′30″N 83°29′26″W	Jefferson City	
12	New Market Presbyterian Church	New Market Presbyterian Church	July 1, 1998 (#98000823)	1000 W. Old Andrew Johnson Highway; 36°06′00″N 83°33′07″W	New Market	
13	Squirewood Hall	Squirewood Hall	July 16, 1973 (#73001793)	Cherokee Dr. 36°00′55″N 83°25′20″W	Dandridge	Built in 1858 by Judge James P. Swann
14	Strawberry Plains Fortification		February 5, 1999 (#99000105)	Address Restricted	Strawberry Plains	

== Former listings ==
One other property was once listed, but has since been removed.

	Name on the Register	Image	Date listed	Date removed	Location	City or town	Description
1	Samuel Isaac Newman House		July 17, 1980 (#80003838)	November 19, 2008	Bible Road	Jefferson City	

== See also ==
- List of National Historic Landmarks in Tennessee
- National Register of Historic Places listings in Tennessee
