= Tom Beck (American football, born 1974) =

American football player (born 1974)

Profile
- Position: Quarterback

Personal information
- Born: May 5, 1974 (age 52); Castro Valley, California, U.S.
- Listed height: 6 ft 1 in (1.85 m)
- Listed weight: 215 lb (98 kg)

Career information
- High school: Grand Junction (Grand Junction, Colorado)
- College: Northern Colorado
- NFL draft: 1997: undrafted

Career history
- Denver Broncos (1997)*; Scottish Claymores (1998); Chicago Bears (1998)*; Buffalo Destroyers (1999)*; Portland Forest Dragons (1999)
- * Offseason or practice squad member only

Awards and highlights
- NCAA Division II national champion (1996); Second-team All-NCC (1995)
- Stats at ArenaFan.com

Thomas D. Beck (born May 5, 1974) is an American former football player. A quarterback, he played college football for the Northern Colorado Bears and led them to a victory in the 1996 NCAA Division II national championship game. He signed with the Denver Broncos after going unselected in the 1997 NFL draft, and competed for a backup quarterback spot on the team. After being released by the Broncos, Beck had a brief stint with the Scottish Claymores of NFL Europe in 1998. He was later a member of the Chicago Bears' practice squad during the 1998 NFL season. He ended his pro football career by starting one game for the Portland Forest Dragons of the Arena Football League (AFL) in 1999. Beck was inducted into Northern Colorado's athletics hall of fame in 2004.

== Early life ==
Thomas D. Beck was born on May 5, 1974, in Castro Valley, California. He played four years of high school football at Grand Junction High School in Grand Junction, Colorado. He became the starting quarterback as a sophomore. As a senior in 1991, Beck threw for 1,963 yards, 22 touchdowns, and eight interceptions. He was named second-team all-state by the Rocky Mountain News and honorable mention all-state by The Denver Post. He also played basketball and baseball in high school. Northern Colorado Bears football coach Kay Dalton had shown interest in Beck since his sophomore year in high school. A few NCAA Division I schools, including San Diego State and Washington State, offered Beck a chance to walk-on. Beck narrowed his choices down to Northern Colorado and his hometown Mesa State.

== College career ==
In January 1992, Beck committed to play college football at the University of Northern Colorado in Greeley, Colorado. He redshirted the 1992 season. He saw limited playing time from 1993 to 1994 as the backup to John Roberts. Beck became the starter in 1995 after Roberts graduated. During the 1995 regular season, Beck threw for 2,239 yards, 18 touchdowns, and 12 interceptions. He helped Northern Colorado finish with a regular season record of 9–2, advancing to the first round of the NCAA Division II playoffs where they lost to Pittsburg State by a score of 36–17. Beck garnered second-team All-North Central Conference (NCC) recognition for his performance during the 1995 season.

As a senior in 1996, Beck completed 184 of 354 passes (52.0%) for 2,303 yards and 19 touchdowns while also rushing for eight touchdowns. In the 1996 postseason, he directed game-winning drives in the first-round, quarterfinal, and semifinal playoff games. In the 1996 NCAA Division II national championship game, he led the Bears to a 23–14 victory over Carson–Newman. Beck earned honorable mentions All-NCC honors for the 1996 season. He finished his college career with totals of 5,121 passing yards, 43 touchdown passes, 407 rushing yards, and ten rushing touchdowns. He graduated from Northern Colorado in 1997, and was inducted into the school's athletics hall of fame in 2004.

== Professional career ==
Prior to the 1997 NFL draft, Beck worked out for over a dozen NFL teams at Northern Colorado's campus. After the sixth round of the draft, Denver Broncos offensive coordinator Gary Kubiak called Beck and told him that the Broncos would sign him if he went unselected. Beck signed with the Broncos on April 21, 1997. The Oakland Raiders also showed interest in signing him. Beck lived just three houses away from the Broncos' practice facility in Greeley. He competed with Jeff Lewis, Bubby Brister, and fellow Grand Junction High alum Bill Musgrave for a backup quarterback spot on the team. Beck was released on August 18, 1997.

On February 18, 1998, Beck was selected by the Scottish Claymores of NFL Europe with the 130th overall pick in the 1998 NFL Europe draft. He practiced at quarterback, kickoff coverage, tight end, wide receiver, tailback, and fullback while with the Claymores. He was a member of the Claymores for the first three games of the 1998 NFL Europe season but did not record any statistics. Beck was waived on April 24, 1998.

Beck later signed with the Buffalo Destroyers of the Arena Football League (AFL) for the 1999 season. However, on December 16, 1998, he was signed to the Chicago Bears' practice squad after Moses Moreno suffered an ankle injury. At the time the Bears called Beck, he had been working as a residential loan officer in Greeley. Mike Horan, a Bears teammate, had also been working as a loan officer in Colorado earlier in the year. Beck became a free agent after the NFL season ended and re-joined the Destroyers. He competed with Tony Kimbrough, Jay McDonagh, and Paul Kaiser for a spot on the team. Beck played in two preseason games for Buffalo, completing three of eight passes for 19 yards. He was released on April 19, 1999, before the start of the regular season.

After Portland Forest Dragons backup quarterback Chris Dittoe left the team in May 1999, Portland signed Beck to be James Guidry's new backup. Guidry suffered a career-ending spinal injury on May 8, making Beck the starter for the team's next game on May 17, 1999, against the New Jersey Gladiators. Against New Jersey, Beck completed nine of 22 passes for 86 yards while also rushing twice for 33 yards and one touchdown. He was replaced by Harry Leons in the fourth quarter. Beck then left the team.

== Personal life ==
Beck's great-great-great grandfather, William Allen Montgomery, was the president of Carson and Newman College from 1888 to 1892. Beck grew up a fan of John Elway and the Denver Broncos. Upon later signing with the Broncos, Beck told Elway, "I've watched almost every game you've played." As a teenager in Greeley, he was a babysitter for former Chicago Bears player Len Walterscheid. After his playing career, Beck spent time as an assistant football coach and head girl's soccer coach at Northridge High School in Greeley. He also started his own mortgage and financial planning business.
