= Fairvue =

Fairvue may refer to:

- Isaac Franklin Plantation, also known as Fairvue, a former National Historic Landmark that remains listed on the NRHP in Gallatin, Sumner County, Tennessee
- Fairvue (Jefferson City, Tennessee), listed on the National Register of Historic Places in Jefferson County, Tennessee
