= Squirewood Hall =

Historic house in Tennessee, United States

- U.S. National Register of Historic Places
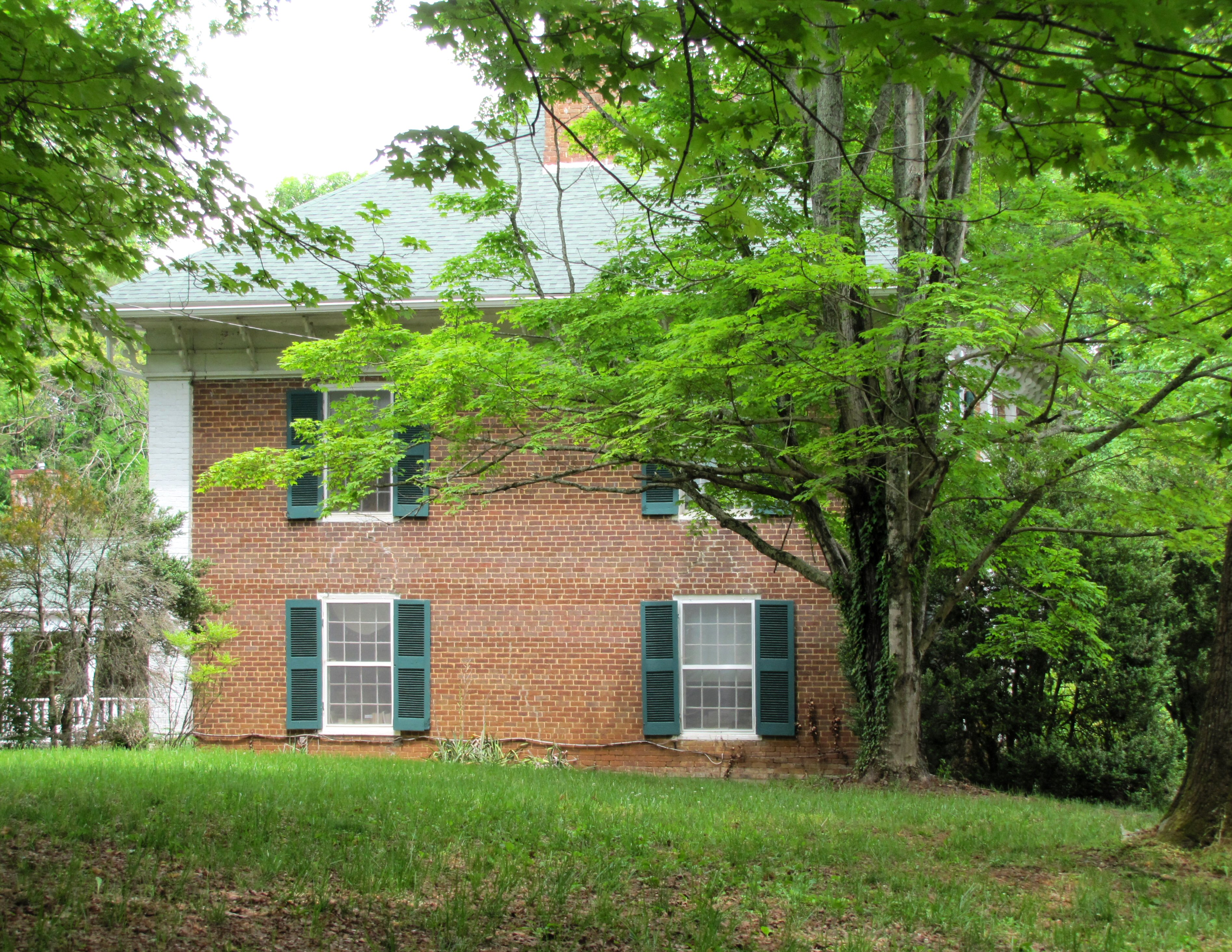
- Spirewood Hall (side view) in 2015

- Location within Tennessee Location within the United States
- Location: Cherokee Dr., Dandridge, Tennessee, U.S.
- Coordinates: 36°0′55″N 83°25′20″W
- Area: 6 acres (2.4 ha)
- Built: 1858
- NRHP reference No.: 73001793
- Added to NRHP: July 16, 1973

Squirewood Hall, later known as Hampton House, is a historic house in Dandridge, Tennessee, US.

== History ==
The two-story house was completed in 1858. It was built with red bricks for Judge James Preston Swann (1819–1884). A Southern Unionist, Swann represented Jefferson County at the pro-Union East Tennessee Convention following the outbreak of the Civil War in 1861. He served as a state circuit court judge in the years following the war.

== Architectural significance ==
It has been listed on the National Register of Historic Places since July 16, 1973.
