= Fairfax (White Pine, Tennessee) =

Historic house in Tennessee, United States

- U.S. National Register of Historic Places
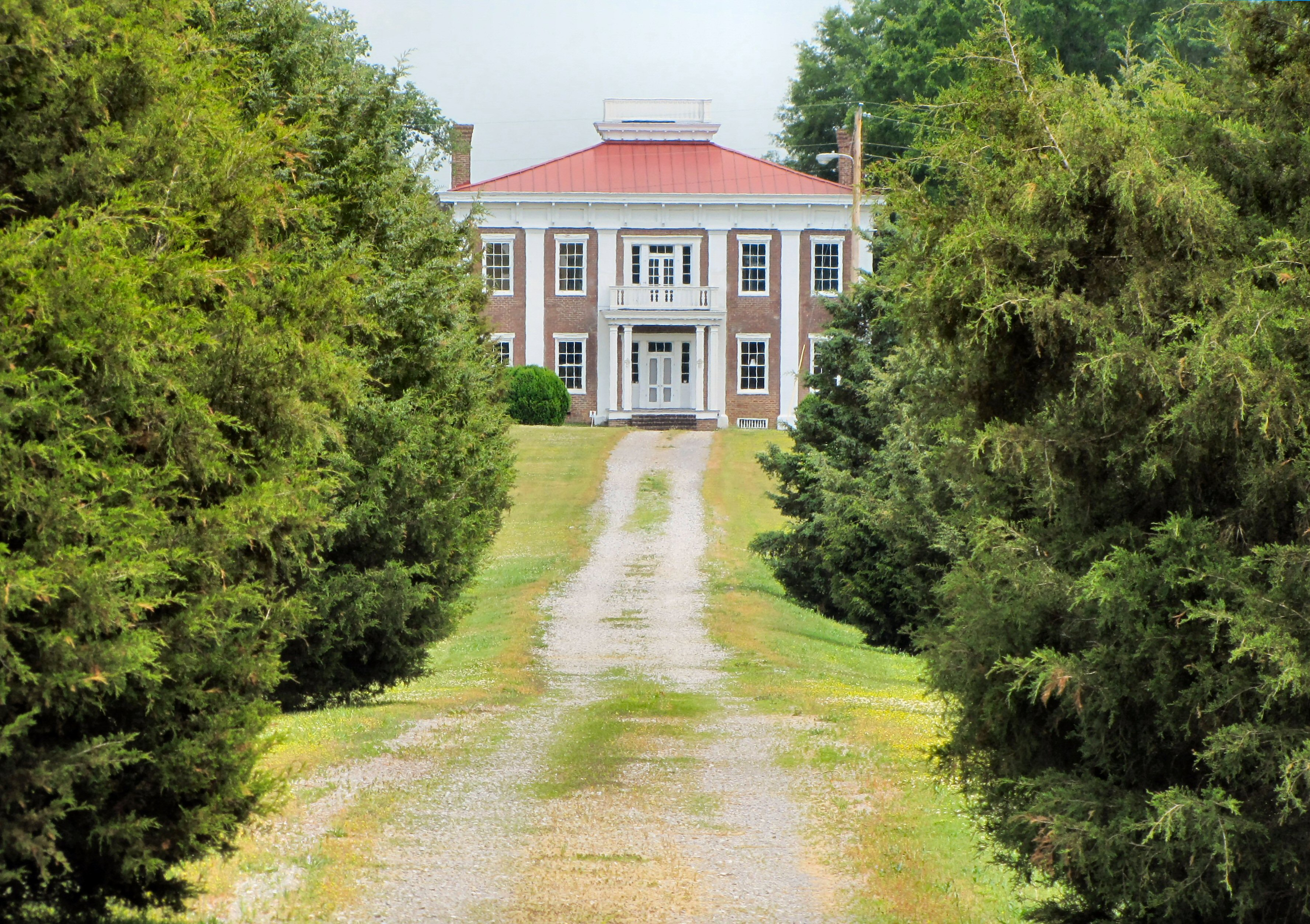
- Fairfax in 2015

- Location within Tennessee Location within the United States
- Location: White Pine, Tennessee, U.S.
- Coordinates: 36°4′4″N 83°15′9″W
- Area: 7 acres (2.8 ha)
- Built: 1840
- Architectural style: Greek Revival
- NRHP reference No.: 73001795
- Added to NRHP: April 13, 1973

Fairfax is a historic mansion in White Pine, Jefferson County, Tennessee, USA.

== History ==
The mansion was completed in 1840. It was built by Lawson D. Franklin (1801–1861), Tennessee's first millionaire, for his son, Isaac White Rodgers Franklin, Sr. (1827–1866). It was designed in the Greek Revival architectural style.

Senator Herbert S. Walters grew up in this house. By 1953, it was acquired by Thomas H. Berry and his wife, Ellen McClung. They restored it a year later, in 1954. They hired Irish painter James Reynolds to do the murals in the living-room.

== Architectural significance ==
It has been listed on the National Register of Historic Places since April 13, 1973. The house was surveyed and photographed for the Historic American Buildings Survey, where it is called the Isaac Franklin House.
