= Hill–Hance House =

Historic house in Tennessee, United States

- U.S. National Register of Historic Places
- Location within Tennessee Location within the United States
- Location: Chestnut Hill, Tennessee, U.S.
- Coordinates: 35.9412°N 83.3083°W
- Area: 3 acres (1.2 ha)
- Built: c. 1800
- Architectural style: Saddlebag House
- NRHP reference No.: 82003977
- Added to NRHP: August 26, 1982

The Hill–Hance House is a historic house in Chestnut Hill, Tennessee, United States.

== History ==
The house was built circa 1800. It was acquired by Joseph Hill by 1827. By 1982, it belonged to his great-granddaughter, Ira Hill Hance.

== Architectural significance ==
It has been listed on the National Register of Historic Places since August 26, 1982.
