= Harry Leons =

American football player (born 1974)

Profile
- Position: Quarterback

Personal information
- Born: December 20, 1974 (age 51)
- Listed height: 6 ft 2 in (1.88 m)
- Listed weight: 211 lb (96 kg)

Career information
- High school: Olympia (Olympia, Washington)
- College: Eastern Washington (1993–1997)
- NFL draft: 1998: undrafted

Career history
- Portland Forest Dragons (1999); Los Angeles Avengers (2000–2001)

Awards and highlights
- First-team All-American (1997); Big Sky Offensive Player of the Year (1997)
- Stats at ArenaFan.com

Harry Leons (born December 20, 1974) is an American former professional football player who was a quarterback in the Arena Football League (AFL) with the Portland Forest Dragons and Los Angeles Avengers. He played college football and basketball for the Eastern Washington Eagles. He joined the Eagles football team as a walk-on sixth-string quarterback but eventually became the team's starter. Leons led the Eagles to the 1997 NCAA Division I-AA Semifinal, earning Big Sky Conference Offensive Player of the Year and Burger King Division I-AA first-team All-American honors. After his college career, Leons played three seasons in the AFL. Primarily a backup during his AFL career, he started one game for the Los Angeles Avengers in 2001.

== Early life ==
Harry Leons was born on December 20, 1974. He played high school football, basketball, and baseball at Olympia High School in Olympia, Washington. He started his first football game at quarterback as a sophomore. He took over as the full-time starter his junior year but suffered a season-ending knee injury after a 3–0 start. As a senior, Leons broke his thumb in late October, missing the rest of the season. He graduated from Olympia High in 1993.

== College career ==
Leons walked on to the Eastern Washington Eagles football program in 1993. At the time he joined the team, he had lost 30 pounds (14 kg) due to mononucleosis. Head coach Mike Kramer said, "The first time I saw him in person, I wondered what had befallen the coach that had recruited him to think he could even walk on to our program. Here was this scrawny little guy, who only weighed 154 pounds, and I'm wondering what the heck happened to his arm." Leons temporarily left the football team during fall 1993 to walk on to the basketball team, where he played guard. He took a redshirt in both football and basketball for the 1993 season. He returned to the football team full-time in spring 1994. Through his first two seasons, he practiced at wide receiver on the scout team and played kickoff coverage on the junior varsity team. Leons also had tendinitis in his arm. Kramer later said, "He was so far down the depth chart he never really even got a look. In fact, we used to laugh about him because even though he wasn't getting any playing time, he'd show up on the injury list with a sore arm." Leons later said that he was the sixth-string quarterback at one point, with Kramer stating, "There was no chance, I mean NO chance, that he would ever be our quarterback. His drill work was so bad" and "He'd always get to play at the end of scrimmages, and I mean at the very end of scrimmages – when it was kind of an afterthought. He'd be out there with the most rag-tag assortment of players you've ever seen and they'd just be going up and down the field."

In 1995, Leons beat out Scott Bond for the second-string quarterback job behind starter Brian Sherick. After Sherick was suspended for disciplinary reasons, Leons made his first career start but threw five interceptions. After Sherick suffered a season-ending injury a few weeks later, Leons threw for 227 yards and one touchdown in a 28–10 victory over Montana State. Leons remained the starter for the remainder of the year. He returned as starter in 1996, helping the Eagles win four out of their first five games before suffering a season-ending torn ACL. On October 18, 1997, Leons threw for 423 yards (the third-highest total in school history at the time) and three touchdowns in a 40–35 win over the Montana Grizzlies, snapping Montana's 30-game home winning streak. Overall in 1997, he completed 159 of 257 passes (61.9%) for 2,588 yards, 21 touchdowns and five interceptions, earning Big Sky Conference Offensive Player of the Year and Burger King Division I-AA first-team All-American honors. Leons' 169.5 passer rating also set the school's single-season record. The 1997 Eastern Washington Eagles finished the season with a 12–2 record, and lost to Youngstown State in the NCAA Division I-AA Semifinal. The 1997 team was inducted into the Eastern Washington Hall of Fame in 2012. Leons finished his college career with totals of 4,964 passing yards and 36 passing touchdowns while also setting Eastern Washington's career passer rating record (140.8).

== Professional career ==
Leons went unselected in the 1998 NFL draft. The Toronto Argonauts of the Canadian Football League offered him a contract but he declined it due to the team already having three other quarterbacks.

Leons signed with the Portland Forest Dragons of the Arena Football League (AFL) on April 5, 1999. After starter James Guidry suffered a season-ending injury, Leons replaced new starter Tom Beck in the fourth quarter of the May 17 game against the New Jersey Gladiators. Leons completed eight of 13 passes for 101 yards and one touchdown while also rushing for a touchdown as Portland lost 38–24. His rushing touchdown was the first of his football career at any level. Beck then left the team, and the Forest Dragons signed Ron Lopez. Leons served as Lopez's backup. Leons was also the team's holder. On June 19 against the Grand Rapids Rampage, Lopez suffered a mild concussion and was benched for poor play. Leons entered the game for the last offensive series and threw a touchdown with 38 seconds left to give Portland a 46–36 lead. The Forest Dragons hung on to win 46–43. He played in 12 games overall during the 1999 season, completing 10 of 16 passes (62.5%) for 146 yards and two touchdowns while also rushing two times for two yards and one touchdown. Leons reportedly earned $1,000 per week during his time with the Forest Dragons.

In March 2000, Leons was selected by the Los Angeles Avengers in the 12th round, with the 25th overall pick, of the 2000 AFL expansion draft. He beat out Justin Vedder for the team's third-string quarterback job behind starter Scott Semptimphelter and backup Todd Marinovich. Leons did not end up appearing in any games during the 2000 AFL season. He re-signed with the Avengers on January 12, 2001. He was placed on recallable waivers on June 5 and signed to the team's practice squad on June 18. Leons was promoted back to the active roster on July 12 after Tony Graziani and Marinovich both suffered injuries. Leons started the July 13 game against the Carolina Cobras but separated his shoulder in the first quarter. He was placed on injured reserve on July 18, 2001. He played in two games overall for Los Angeles during the 2001 season, completing four of seven passes for 46 yards. Leons re-signed with the Avengers again on February 19, 2002. However, he separated his right throwing shoulder in a preseason game and was then waived/injured by the Avengers on April 15, 2002, before the start of the 2002 AFL season.

== Personal life ==
Leons graduated from Eastern Washington with a radio/television degree in spring 1998. After his football career, he worked as a sales representative for an industrial supplies company in Chicago. He later started a small business in Chicago.
