= William Allen Montgomery =

American journalist

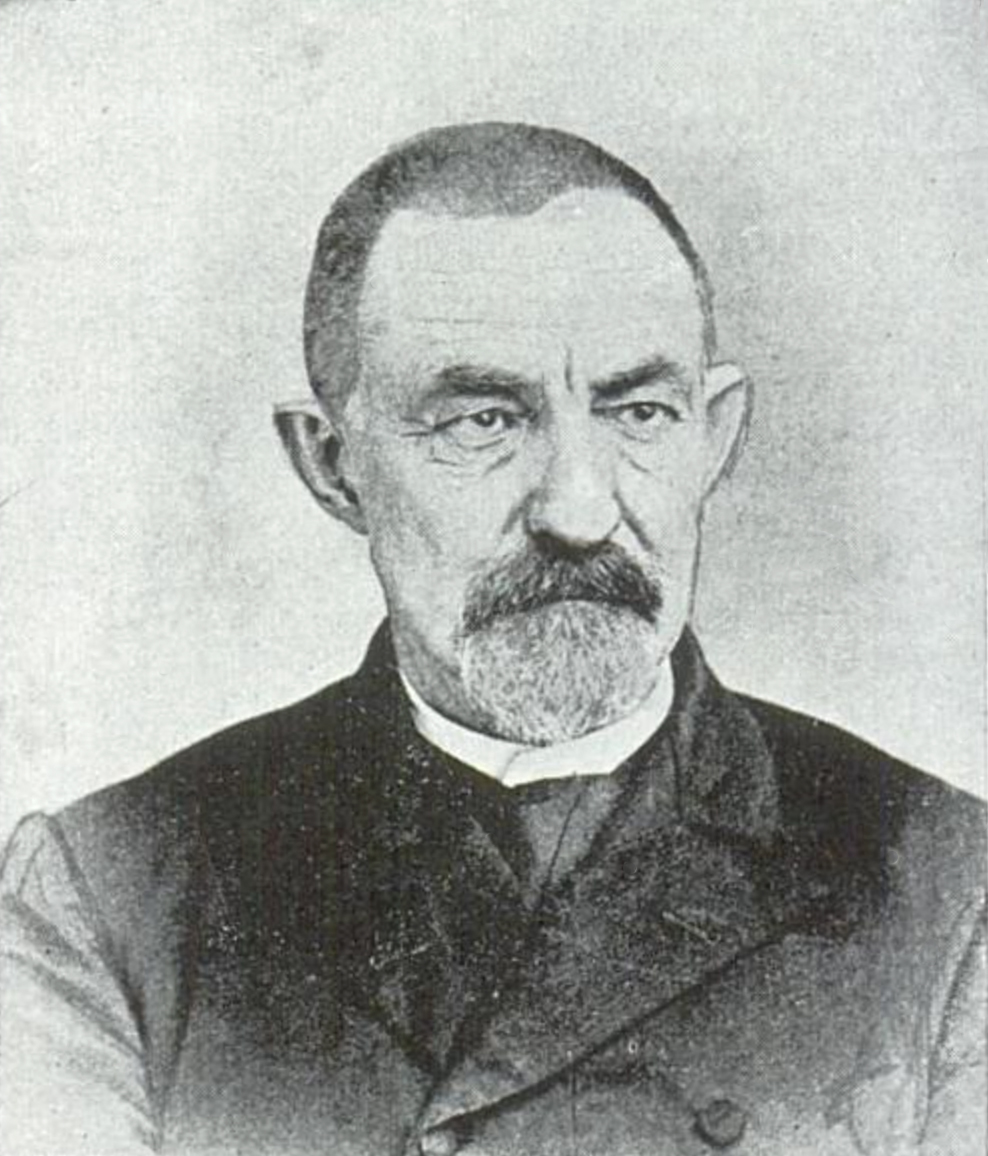
- Born: November 16, 1829; Jefferson County, Tennessee, U.S.
- Died: December 5, 1905 (aged 76)
- Education: University of Tennessee
- Occupations: Lawyer, planter, Baptist minister
- Spouse: Catherine Smith Franklin
- Children: 7
- Parent(s): William H. Montgomery; Sarah Jarnagin
- Relatives: Lawson D. Franklin (father-in-law)
- Military career
- Allegiance: Confederate States of America (1861–1865)
- Branch: Confederate States Army
- Service years: 1862–1865
- Rank: Chaplain

William Allen Montgomery (November 16, 1829 – December 5, 1905) was an American lawyer, planter and Baptist minister. Trained as a lawyer in Tennessee, he was a cotton planter in Texas in the 1850s and served as a Confederate chaplain in the American Civil War. He served as the President of Carson–Newman University from 1888 to 1892.

== Early life ==
William Allen Montgomery was born on November 16, 1829, in Jefferson County, Tennessee. His father was William H. Montgomery and his mother, Sarah Jarnagin. His paternal grandfather, William Montgomery, was of English descent while his paternal grandmother was of Irish descent. His maternal grandfather, Chesley Jarnagin, was of Welsh descent while his maternal grandmother, the daughter of Baptist minister Isaac Barton, was of Huguenot and Dutch descent.

Montgomery was baptized in 1843. He went to the University of Tennessee in 1845, graduating in 1850. After serving as a legal aide to E. Alexander, a judge on the Knoxville Circuit Court, Montgomery was admitted to the bar in 1851. Later, Montgomery received a Doctor in Divinity from Carson–Newman University in 1870, and a Legum Doctor from the University of Tennessee in 1876.

== Career ==
Montgomery became a cotton planter in Texas in 1855. In 1861, at the outset of the American Civil War, Montgomery voted in favor of secession, representing Washington County, Texas. By 1962, he became a Baptist chaplain in the Confederate States Army. At the end of the war, he had lost his wealth, but he was able to return to his life as a planter by working on his father-in-law's plantations in Tennessee.

Montgomery was ordained as a Baptist minister in 1868. He was a Baptist minister in Leadvale and Dandridge from 1868 to 1872. He then served as minister in Lynchburg, Virginia, from 1872 to 1878. Subsequently, he was a minister in Memphis, Tennessee, Chattanooga, Tennessee, Greensboro, Georgia, Thomaston, Georgia, Rogersville, Tennessee, Hot Springs, North Carolina, and Jefferson City, Tennessee. At the same time, Montgomery was an evangelist in West Tennessee and Mississippi. Over the course of his service, at least 1,000 people were baptized in the Baptist Church.

Montgomery served as corresponding secretary of the board of missions of the Tennessee Baptist Convention from 1877 to 1880. He subsequently served as the President of the Tennessee Baptist Convention in 1881.

Montgomery served as the President of Carson–Newman University from 1888 to 1892. During his tenure, he oversaw the unification of Carson College, an all-male college, with Newman College, a women's college, in 1889. Meanwhile, the Administration Building, where classes were taught, was completed in 1892. (The building burnt down in the 1910s.) At the same time, Montgomery was also Professor of Metaphysics and Theology.

Montgomery served as the pastor of the First Baptist Church in Decatur, Georgia, from 1897 to 1903. At the same time, he served as the President of the Pastors' Conference in Atlanta, Georgia, from 1897 to 1903.

Montgomery was associate editor of the Tennessee Baptist with Dr. J. R. Graves. He was subsequently associate editor of the Religious Herald with Drs Jeter and Dickinson. He was also a correspondent for the Baptist and Reflector, another Baptist publication.

== Personal life ==
Montgomery married Catherine Smith Franklin, the daughter of Lawson D. Franklin, a large planter who became Tennessee's first millionaire. The wedding took place on May 9, 1854. They had four sons and three daughters.

Montgomery's great-great-great grandson, Tom Beck, was a professional football player.

== Death ==
Montgomery died on December 16, 1905.
