= Belmont, Jefferson County, Tennessee =

Unincorporated community in Tennessee, US

Coordinates: 36°00′37″N 83°19′03″W

Belmont is an unincorporated community in Jefferson County, in the U.S. state of Tennessee.

Belmont is derived from French, meaning "beautiful mountain".
