= Shady Grove, Jefferson County, Tennessee =

Shady Grove
- Unincorporated community
- Location within Tennessee Location within the United States
- Coordinates: 35°58′42″N 83°29′03″W
- Country: United States
- State: Tennessee
- County: Jefferson
- Elevation: 1,014 ft (309 m)
- Time zone: UTC-5 (Eastern (EST))
  - Summer (DST): UTC-4 (EDT)
- ZIP Code: 37725
- Area code: 865
- GNIS feature ID: U.S. Geological Survey Geographic Names Information System: Shady Grove, Jefferson County, Tennessee

Shady Grove is an unincorporated community in Jefferson County, Tennessee, United States.

== History ==
Before the arrival of European settlers, the Pre-Cherokee Native Americans constructed a metropolis in the area known as Chiaha. The chief village was located on a large island in the French Broad River, which the Tennessee settlers would later name Zimmerman's Island. The area of Shady Grove was part of the Coosa chiefdom at the time of the arrival of the Spanish in the 16th century. Both Hernando De Soto and Juan Pardo passed through the area with their conquistadors.

== Geography ==
Shady Grove is located along the impoundment of the French Broad River by Douglas Lake, and Tennessee State Route 139 (SR 139) 4.6 miles (7.4 km) southwest of Dandridge, the county seat of Jefferson County. The community is serviced by Dandridge's ZIP code, 37725.

== Economy ==
The community is home to several boat docks, marinas, and a lakefront resort hotel complex.

== Infrastructure ==
Since 1963, the community, along with portions of Jefferson and Sevier counties, is served by the Shady Grove Utility District (SGUD). SGUD provides municipal water to its service area, and is headquartered in Shady Grove on SR 139 since 2001.
