= Dandridge Historic District =

Historic district in Tennessee, United States

- U.S. National Register of Historic Places
- U.S. Historic district
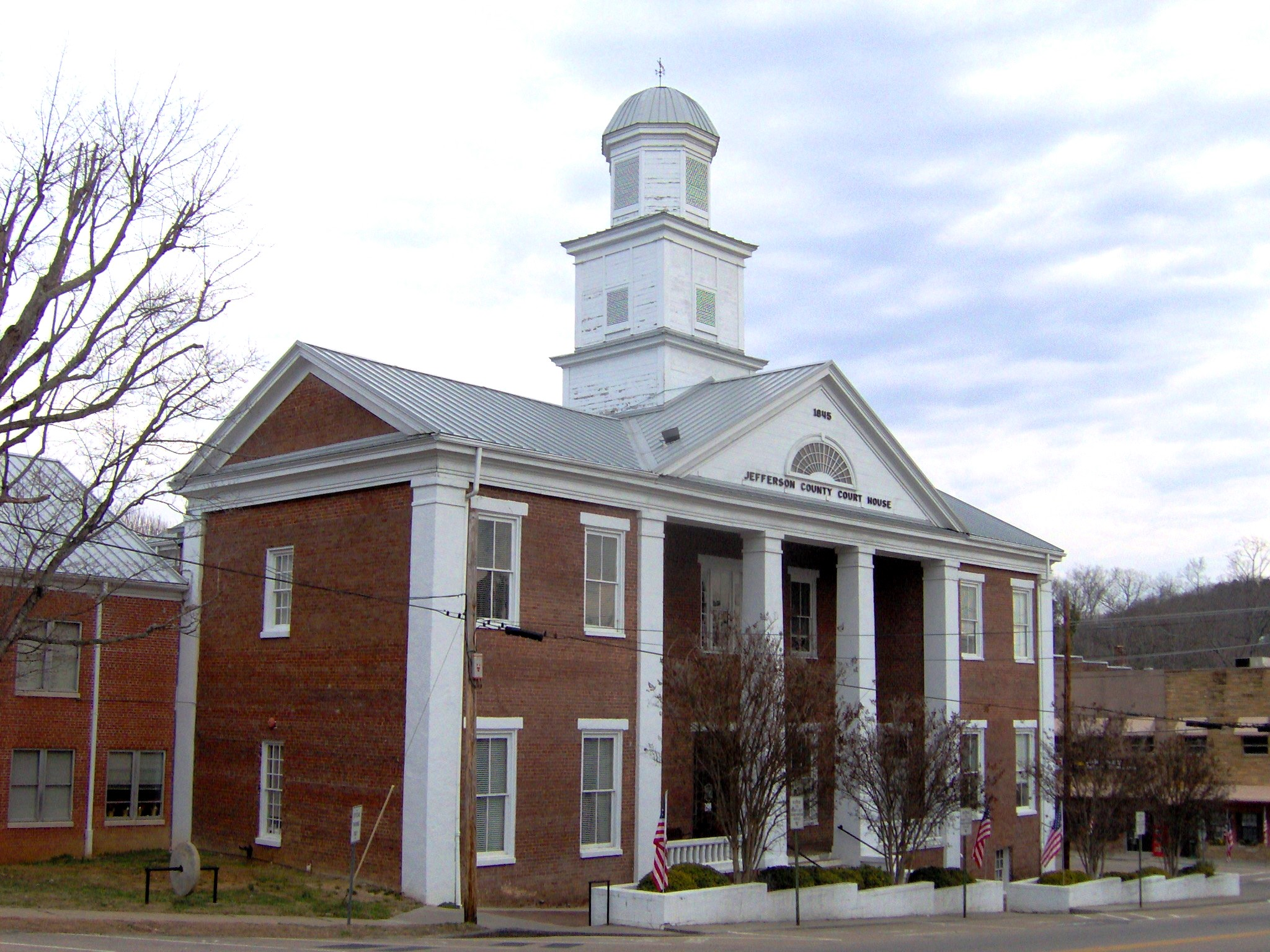
- Jefferson County Courthouse

- Location within Tennessee Location within the United States
- Location: Town center around Main, Meeting, and Gay Sts., Dandridge, Tennessee
- Coordinates: 36.01593°N 83.41533°W
- Area: 100 acres (40 ha)
- NRHP reference No.: 73001792
- Added to NRHP: January 22, 1973

The Dandridge Historic District in Dandridge, Tennessee, is a historic district that is listed on the National Register of Historic Places.

The historic district comprises Dandridge's downtown area. Significant properties in the district include the second Jefferson County courthouse, a Greek Revival building completed in 1845, as well as four of the town's original taverns, Roper Tavern, Hickman Tavern, Shepherd's Inn, and Thomas Tavern. Federal and Greek Revival architectural styles are predominant among the early buildings.

The historic district is separated from Douglas Lake by a dike constructed in 1942 to protect the downtown from inundation after the Tennessee Valley Authority built Douglas Dam.
