= John Paci =

American football player

Profile
- Position: Quarterback

Career information
- High school: Huntington (Huntington, New York)
- College: Indiana (1990–1994)
- NFL draft: 1995: undrafted

Career history
- Barcelona Dragons (1995); Frankfurt Galaxy (1996)*; New York Jets (1996); Washington Redskins (1999)*
- * Offseason or practice squad member only

John P. Paci III is an American former football quarterback. He played college football for the Indiana Hoosiers from 1991 to 1994. He began his college career as the backup to Trent Green and became the full-time starter after Green graduated. Paci was benched for Chris Dittoe his senior year. Paci spent part of the 1996 season as the third-string quarterback for the New York Jets of the National Football League (NFL). He received the Jets' 1996 Lyons Award for community service.

== Early life ==
Paci played high school football at Huntington High School in Huntington, New York. He won the Hansen Award as the best football player in Suffolk County, New York. In February 1990, he committed to play college football for the Indiana Hoosiers over Maryland, Wisconsin, and Florida State.

== College career ==
Paci redshirted the 1990 season. He served as the third-string quarterback in 1991, only attempting one pass all season. Paci was the backup to Trent Green in 1992. Due to an injury to Green, Paci made his first career start on October 31, 1992, against the Minnesota Golden Gophers. He completed 19 of 33 passes for 204 yards and one touchdown in the 24–17 victory. After Green graduated, Paci became the full-time starter in 1993. He finished the year completing 123 of 236 passes (52.1%) for 1,625 yards, seven touchdowns, and six interceptions while also rushing for 200 yards and three touchdowns. He missed one game due to injury. As a senior in 1994, Paci split time in games with Chris Dittoe. Paci started the first nine games of the season before being benched. After Dittoe suffered an injury, Paci returned as starter for the season finale. Paci finished his senior year with totals of 96 completions on 176 attempts (54.5%) for 996 yards, six touchdowns, five interceptions, 160 rushing yards, and eight rushing touchdowns. He ended his college career with 252 completions on 473 attempts (53.3%) for 2,948 yards, 14 touchdowns, 14 interceptions, 383 rushing yards, and 12 rushing touchdowns.

== Professional career ==
=== World League of American Football ===
After going undrafted in the 1995 NFL draft, Paci signed with the Barcelona Dragons of the World League of American Football (WLAF). He was a backup for the Dragons in 1995, and did not play in any games. He signed with the Frankfurt Galaxy for the 1996 WLAF season, but was released before the start of the season.

=== New York Jets ===
Paci signed with the New York Jets on March 29, 1996. Going into the preseason, he was listed as the No. 4 quarterback on the depth chart. He was "very impressive" during the Jets' preseason opener against the Houston Oilers on August 3, completing 15 of 26 passes for 137 yards in nearly two quarters of playing time. He also scrambled for 17 yards and led the Jets to their only touchdown, as they lost 31–13.

Paci was waived on August 19, 1996, signed to the practice squad on August 27, released on September 3, and signed to the practice squad again on September 17. He was promoted to the active roster on October 11 to serve as the third-string quarterback behind backup Glenn Foley and starter Frank Reich. Paci was waived again on October 29, signed to the practice squad on November 1, promoted to the active roster again on November 8, waived again on November 11, signed to the practice squad for the fourth time on November 13, promoted to the active roster for the third time on November 15, released for the fifth time on November 25, signed to the practice squad for the fifth time on November 27, and promoted to the active roster for the fourth time on December 3, 1996. Paci received the team's 1996 Lyons Award for community service.

Paci re-signed with the Jets on March 17, 1997. He was later waived for the final time on August 11 after the second game of the 1997 preseason.

=== Washington Redskins ===
After a year unsigned, Paci signed with the Washington Redskins on April 13, 1999. He competed with Rodney Peete and Casey Weldon for a backup job on the team behind starter Brad Johnson. Paci was waived on August 30, 1999.

== Personal life and legacy ==
Paci's father, John Paci Jr., played college football at Hofstra and won several awards for service during the Vietnam War. Paci III's brother, James, played defensive back and wide receiver at Yale. His uncle Mike D'Amato played for the Jets.

Paci later became a managing director at Morgan Stanley. His son, John Paci IV, played quarterback at Huntington High School and Lafayette College.

Paci was inducted into the National Football Foundation’s Long Island Football Hall of Fame in 2008, and the Suffolk Sports Hall Of Fame in 2021.
