= Lawson D. Franklin =

American slave owner and businessman (1804-1861)

- Born: January 19, 1804
- Died: April 8, 1861 (aged 57)
- Occupation: Planter
- Spouses: Elizabeth Rogers; Catherine Smith
- Children: 3 sons, 3 daughters
- Parent(s): Owen Franklin; Elizabeth Roper
- Relatives: William Allen Montgomery (son-in-law)

Lawson D. Franklin (January 19, 1804 – April 8, 1861) was an American planter, slave trader and businessman in the antebellum South. He was the first millionaire in Tennessee.

== Early life ==
Lawson D. Franklin was born on January 19, 1804, the son of Owen Franklin and Elizabeth "Betsy" Franklin (née Roper). On his paternal side, he was a descendant of one of Benjamin Franklin's brothers.

== Career ==
Franklin was a large landowner and businessman. He traded animals and black slaves. He funded the Bank of East Tennessee, a bank based in Rogersville, Tennessee.

Franklin became the first millionaire in Tennessee.

== Personal life ==
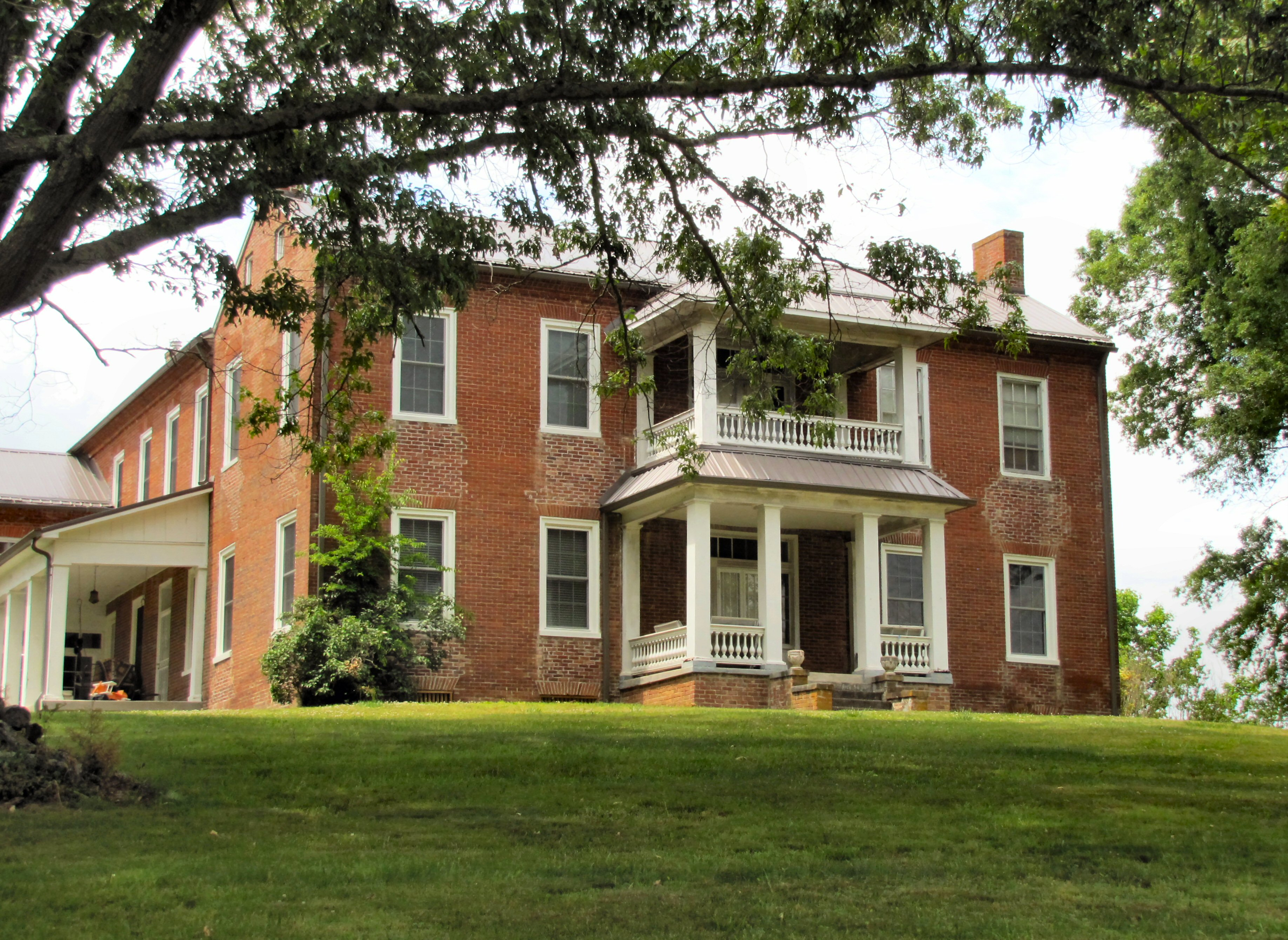
The Lawson D. Franklin House.

Franklin married Elizabeth Rogers (1809–1846). They had three sons, Isaac W. Rodgers (1827–1866), Robert O. Franklin and Lawson D. Franklin (1841–1847), and three daughters, Elizabeth Caroline (1831–1909), Jane June and Louisa. He married a second time to Catherine Smith.

Franklin resided at the Lawson D. Franklin House in White Pine, Tennessee. He built Fairfax in White Pine for his son Isaac, and Bleak House in Knoxville, Tennessee for his daughter Louisa.

== Death ==
Franklin died on April 8, 1861.
