= Christ Temple AME Zion Church =

Historic church in Tennessee, United States

- U.S. National Register of Historic Places
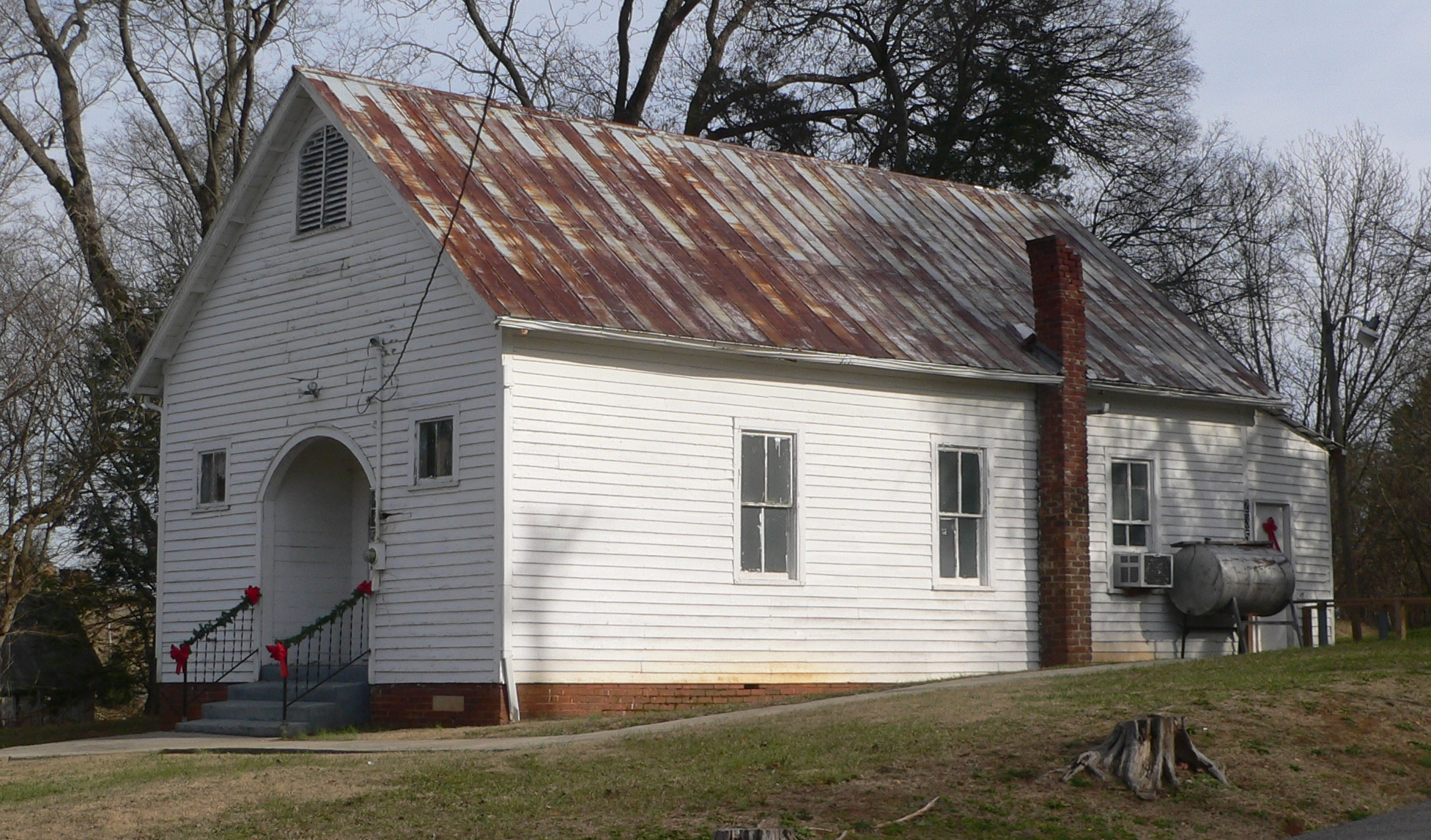
- View from the west. The church faces northwest.

- Location within Tennessee Location within the United States
- Location: 235 E. Meeting St., Dandridge, Tennessee
- Coordinates: 36°1′12.76″N 83°24′32.33″W
- Architectural style: Gable-front
- MPS: Rural African-American Churches in Tennessee MPS
- NRHP reference No.: 05001221
- Added to NRHP: November 09, 2005

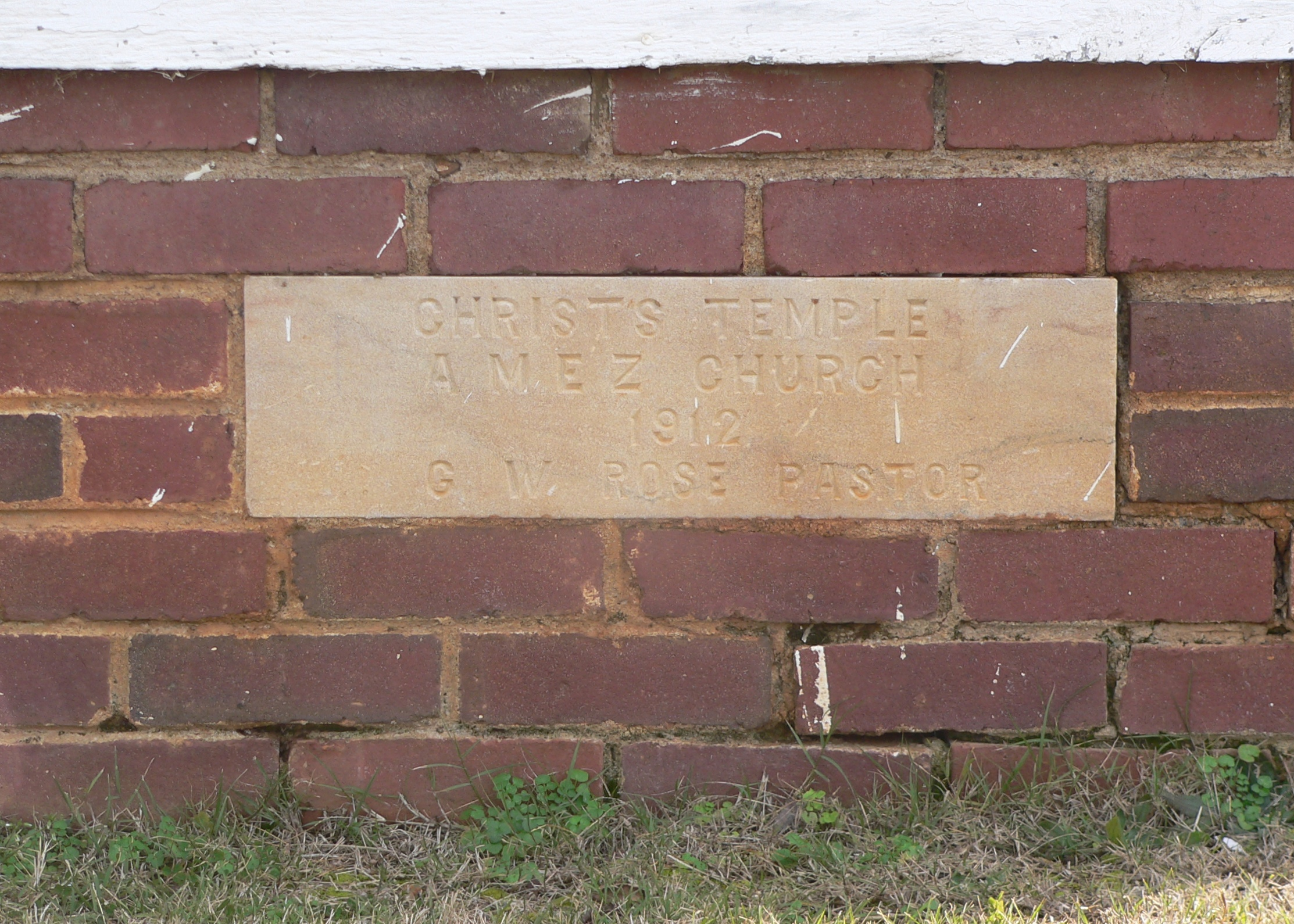
Dedication stone installed in 1912

Christ Temple AME Zion Church, also known as Belmont Annex Fellowship Hall, is a historic African-American church at 235 E. Meeting Street in Dandridge, Tennessee.

The church's building was originally located in southwestern Dandridge, immediately behind the Bethel Presbyterian Church. It was built circa 1888. In 1912 the congregation was rededicated as Christ Temple AME Zion, and the name and date were recorded on a rectangular marble stone installed in the foundation.

In 1935 the church was relocated when its site was acquired by the Jefferson County Board of Education to make room for construction of a new white-only segregated school that was to be built through a New Deal program. The school board bought the site at East Meeting Street and Lake Drive from an African-American Missionary Baptist congregation, and traded that property to the Christ Temple AME Zion congregation in exchange for the AME Zion church's site, so the new school could be built on the former AME Zion church property. The church's building was moved to the new site and rebuilt; the rebuilt building included parts of the 1888 building, but likely contained some new materials and elements. It is a single-story gable-front church building on a brick foundation, with weatherboard siding and a metal-covered roof. It has an arched recessed entranced with two-pane square windows on either side. There is a wood ventilation grille above the entrance at the gable point of the facade.

The church ended regular operations in 2002, when only five active members remained in the congregation. Its building became an annex of Belmont AME Zion Church, which is located on Swannsylvania Road in Jefferson County.

The church building was added to the National Register of Historic Places in 2005. At the time of the listing, there were plans to remove carpet, fake pine paneling, and a dropped ceiling that had been installed in the church interior around 1970.
