= Jefferson County Public Schools (Tennessee) =

School district in Tennessee, United States

Jefferson County Schools

Address
- 1221 Gay Street Dandridge, Tennessee, 37725; United States
- Coordinates: 36.015525°N 83.415812°W

District information
- Type: Public
- Motto: "An Advancing Tennessee School District"
- Grades: Pre-K-12
- Director of Schools: Dr. Tommy Arnold
- School board: Jefferson County Board of Education
- Schools: 13
- Budget: $99,557,000 (2017)
- NCES District ID: 4702100

Students and staff
- Students: 7,225 (2016-2017)
- Faculty: 1,034.10 (FTE)
- Teachers: 459.80 (FTE)
- Staff: 574.30 (FTE)
- Student–teacher ratio: 15.71

Other information
- Website: www.jc-tn.net

Jefferson County Schools is a public school district within Jefferson County, Tennessee, United States. It is governed by the Jefferson County Board of Education.

The district has one high school, Jefferson County High School (Tennessee). There are two K–8 schools in the district, Rush Strong School and White Pine School. The district also has six K–5 schools (Dandridge Elementary, Jefferson Elementary, Mount Horeb Elementary, New Market Elementary, Piedmont Elementary, and Talbott Elementary) and two middle schools (Jefferson Middle and Maury Middle School).

Jefferson County High School opened in August 1975 as a result of the reorganization of all elementary schools and the consolidation of the existing high schools. Students from White Pine, Rush Strong, Maury, and Jefferson High Schools combined to form a student body of nearly 2300+ in grades 9–12. In its first year of operation, the high school was recognized by the Tennessee School Board Association as the "School of the Year" in Tennessee. The academic, athletic, and activity programs have continued to excel since its opening. Jefferson County High School is accredited by the Southern Association of Colleges and Schools. The Jefferson County School District has also received District SACS accreditation.

The high school is located in the geographic center of Jefferson County. The location is approximately fifteen miles from the most distant commuting student in the county. The campus consists of 60 acres (240,000 m^{2}) including a stadium, gymnasium, playing fields, tennis courts, and the academic complex. The enrollment is approximately 1800 students.

In 2007, Jefferson County Schools embarked on a $78 million building program intended to provide additional classroom space in the elementary schools and renovations to the high school.

Part of the main campus of the high school was repaired after rain in 2013 caused roofing to collapse. Prior to these repairs none had taken place since the building of the school in 1974. Repairs were completed in December 2015, including refurbished classrooms, a new fine arts wing, and an auditorium with a capacity of around 600.

The Patriot Academy, a division of the school catering to freshmen, located down the road from the high school, was opened in 2013. Students from the 2013-2014 school year have reported leaks during the first year of that building's use. Some students expressed fear that their school was as dangerous as the main campus. Since then maintenance crews have stopped further leaking and fixed the problems with the roof.
