= Branner-Hicks House =

Historic house in Tennessee, United States

- U.S. National Register of Historic Places
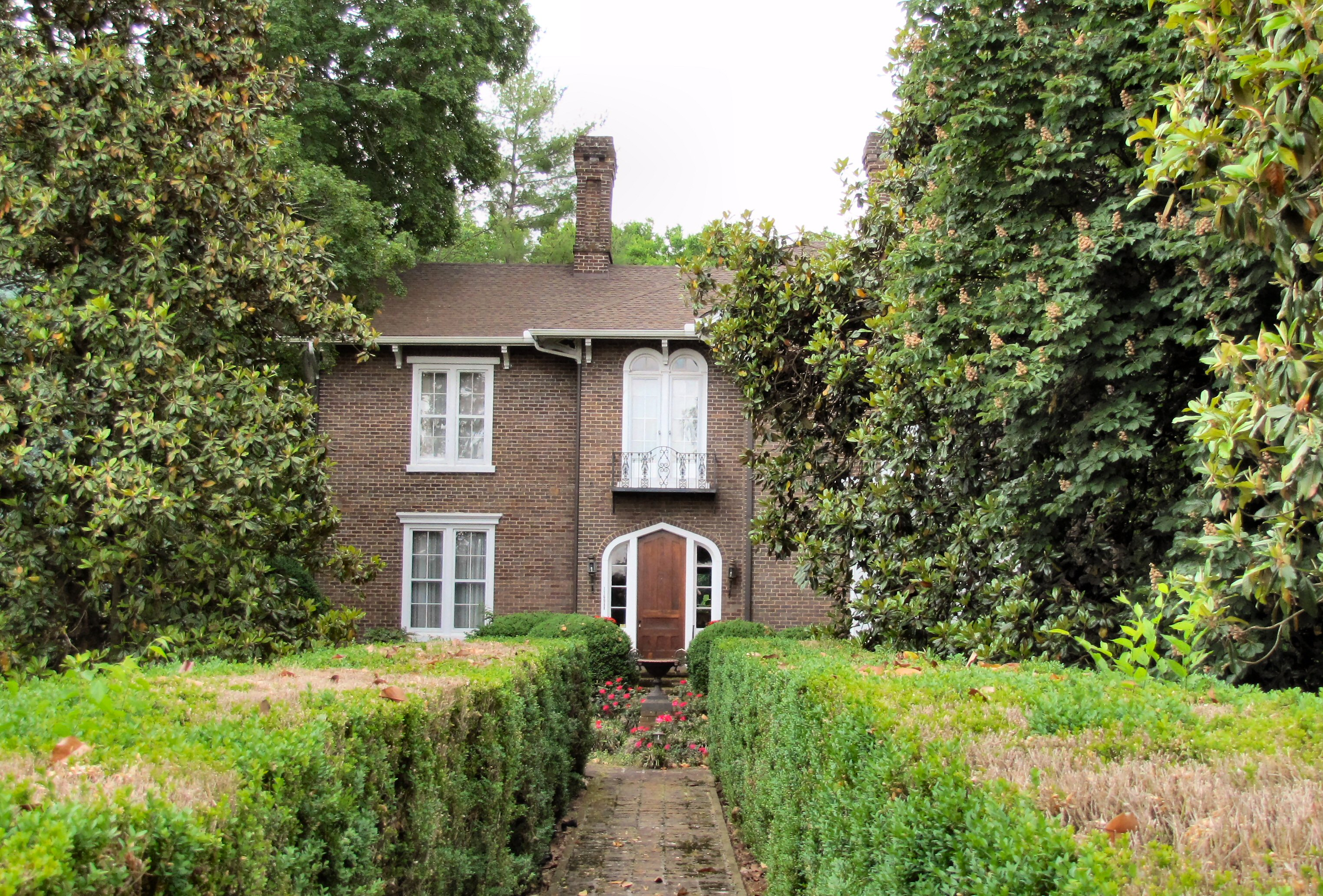
- The Branner-Hicks House in 2015

- Location within Tennessee Location within the United States
- Location: Jefferson City, Tennessee, U.S.
- Coordinates: 36.1267°N 83.4757°W
- Area: 5 acres (2.0 ha)
- Built: 1855
- Architectural style: Gothic Revival, Romanesque Revival
- NRHP reference No.: 74001919
- Added to NRHP: July 9, 1974

The Branner-Hicks House is a historic house in Jefferson City, Tennessee, United States.

== History ==
The house was completed in the mid-1850s. It was built on land acquired by George Branner in the 1830s for his son, Benjamin Manassah Branner (1805–1879), who went on to serve as Lieutenant-Colonel in the Confederate States Army during the American Civil War of 1861–1865.

== Architectural significance ==
The house was designed as a combination of the Gothic Revival architectural style and the Romanesque Revival architectural style. It has been listed on the National Register of Historic Places since July 9, 1974.
