= Chris Dittoe =

American football player (born 1973)

No. 13
- Position: Quarterback

Personal information
- Born: August 31, 1973 (age 53)
- Listed height: 6 ft 6 in (1.98 m)
- Listed weight: 230 lb (104 kg)

Career information
- High school: Bishop Dwenger (Fort Wayne, Indiana)
- College: Indiana (1992–1996)
- NFL draft: 1997: undrafted

Career history
- Detroit Lions (1997–1998); → Frankfurt Galaxy (1998); → Rhein Fire (1999)*; Portland Forest Dragons (1999); Berlin Thunder (1999)
- * Offseason or practice squad member only
- Stats at ArenaFan.com

Chris Dittoe (born August 31, 1973) is an American former football player. A quarterback, he played high school football at Bishop Dwenger High School in Fort Wayne, Indiana, leading the team to back-to-back state title victories. He played college football for the Indiana Hoosiers, and signed with the Detroit Lions of the National Football League (NFL) as an undrafted free agent in 1997. Dittoe was the Lions' third-string quarterback for the final game of the 1998 NFL season. He also played in NFL Europe for the Frankfurt Galaxy and Berlin Thunder, and in the Arena Football League (AFL) for the Portland Forest Dragons. He started for the Galaxy in World Bowl '98. Dittoe was inducted into the Indiana Football Hall of Fame in 2024.

== Early life ==
Chris Dittoe was born August 31, 1973. He attended Bishop Dwenger High School in Fort Wayne, Indiana, where he played baseball, basketball, and football. He was a two-year starting quarterback, helping Bishop Dwenger win back-to-back Class 3A State titles from 1990 to 1991. Dittoe threw for 3,398 yards and 37 touchdowns in his high school football career.

== College career ==
Dittoe played college football for the Indiana Hoosiers of Indiana University Bloomington. He redshirted the 1992 season then was a four-year letterman from 1993 to 1996. After John Paci suffered an injury, Dittoe made his first career start on November 13, 1993, against No. 5 Ohio State. Dittoe completed 16 of 30 passes for 207 yards as Indiana lost 23–17. He played in eight games, including one start after Paci was benched, during the 1994 season, completing 58 of 107 passes (54.2%) for 631 yards, six touchdowns, and one interception while also scoring two rushing touchdowns. Dittoe became the first-string quarterback in 1995 after Paci graduated. However, Dittoe ended up splitting time with Adam Greenlee due to injuries and inconsistency. Dittoe finished the year with totals of 102 completions on 196 passing attempts (52.0%) for 1,214 yards, three touchdowns, six interceptions, and four rushing touchdowns. He split time with redshirt freshman Jay Rodgers in 1996. The Iowa City Press-Citizen stated in October 1996 that, "Chris Dittoe and Jay Rodgers share the position mostly because neither is good enough to win the job outright." Overall in 1996, Dittoe completed 83 of 159 passes (52.2%) for 1,035 yards, three touchdowns, and six interceptions while also rushing for three touchdowns.

== Professional career ==
After going unselected in the 1997 NFL draft, Dittoe signed with the Detroit Lions on June 18, 1997. He was waived on August 24, 1997. He signed with the Lions again on February 3, 1998. Dittoe was allocated to NFL Europe, where he was the backup quarterback for the Frankfurt Galaxy during the 1998 NFL Europe season. After starting quarterback Damon Huard separated his shoulder in the regular season finale against the Rhein Fire, Dittoe played the second half of the game. The Galaxy won 20–17 and clinched a spot in World Bowl '98. With Huard still injured, Dittoe started for Frankfurt in the World Bowl on June 14, 1998, against the Fire. He completed 15 of 27 passes for 111 yards and two interceptions as the Galaxy lost 34–10. Dittoe re-signed with the Lions on June 24, 1998. He played the fourth quarter of the preseason game against the Cincinnati Bengals on August 22, and was waived on August 24. Dittoe was re-signed by the Lions again on December 19. He served as the third-string quarterback for the final game of the regular season. In February 1999, he was allocated to NFL Europe to play for the Rhein Fire. He left the Fire during the preseason.

Dittoe then joined the Portland Forest Dragons of the Arena Football League (AFL). He made his AFL debut on May 1, 1999. He entered the game at quarterback with a minute left after starter James Guidry had to move to receiver to replace the injured Brian Greene. Dittoe completed three of six passes for 18 yards as the Forest Dragons lost to the Nashville Kats by a score of 37–31. Dittoe then decided to leave the team.

After injuries to Andre Ware and Chuck Clements, Dittoe signed with the Berlin Thunder of NFL Europe on May 19, 1999. He completed 64 of 132 passes (48.5%) for 693 yards, four touchdowns, and six interceptions during the 1999 season.

== Personal life and legacy ==
In 1999, Dittoe founded Dittoe PR, a public relations company in Indianapolis. He was inducted into the Bishop Dwenger Hall of Fame in 2014. He was elected to the Indiana Football Hall of Fame in 2024 for his high school career.
