= Glenmore (Jefferson City, Tennessee) =

Historic house in Tennessee, United States

- U.S. National Register of Historic Places
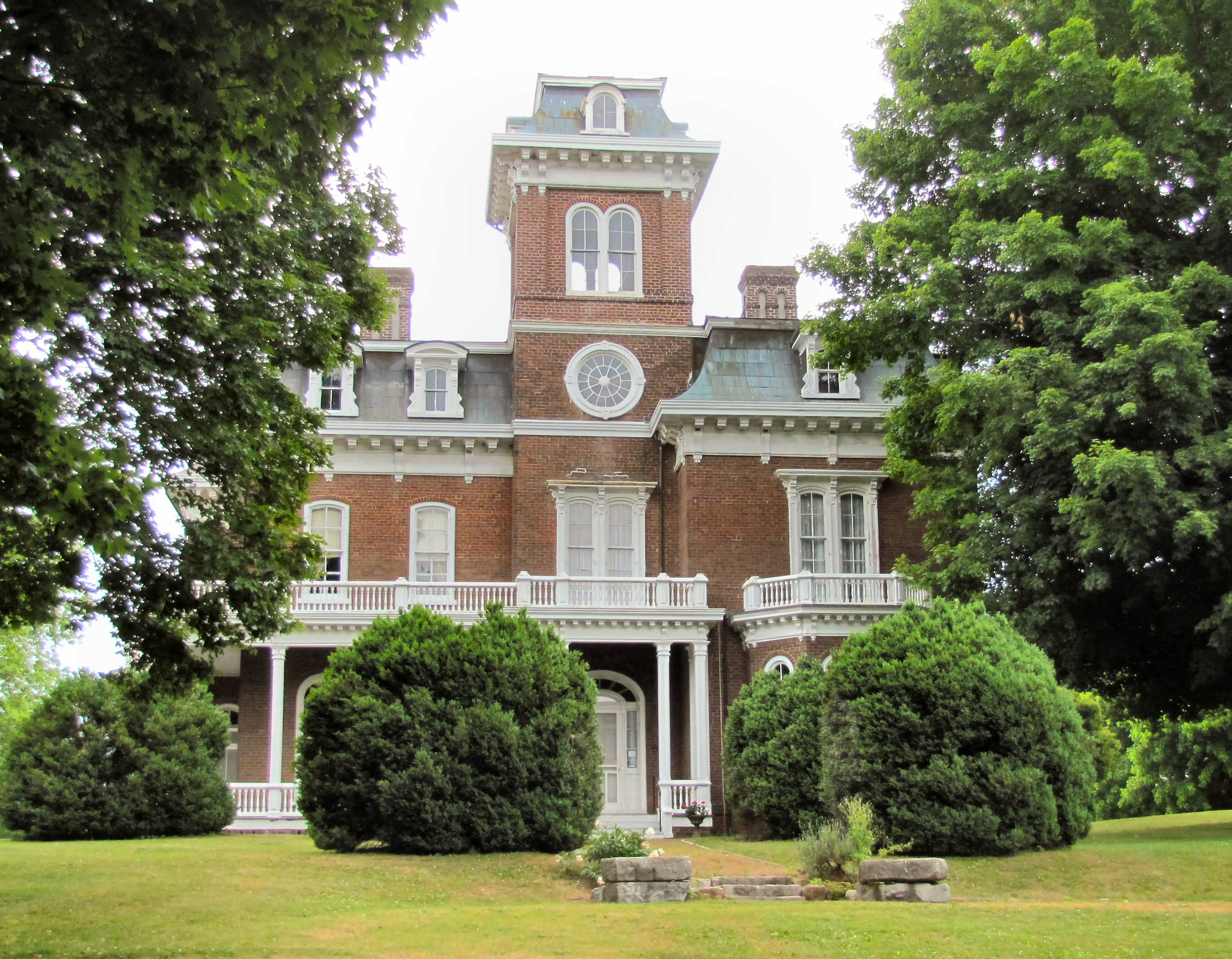
- Glenmore in 2015

- Location within Tennessee Location within the United States
- Location: Jefferson City, Tennessee, U.S.
- Coordinates: 36°7′40″N 83°28′59″W
- Area: 6 acres (2.4 ha)
- Built: 1868-1869
- Architectural style: Second Empire
- NRHP reference No.: 73001794
- Added to NRHP: April 13, 1973

Glenmore is a historic house in Jefferson City, Tennessee, United States.

== History ==
The three-story house was built in 1868-1869 for John Roper Branner, the President of the East Tennessee, Virginia and Georgia Railway. From 1868 to 1879, it was the location of the Branner Institute for Young Women, run by his brother.

The house was acquired by Milton Preston Jarnagin in 1882. It was Jarnagin who named it Glenmore. When he died, the house was inherited by his son, Frank Watkins Jarnagin, who raised Percheron horses on the property.

It was deeded to the Preservation of Tennessee Antiquities in 1969–1970.

== Architectural significance ==
The house was designed in the Second Empire architectural style. It has been listed on the National Register of Historic Places since April 13, 1973.
