= Lawson D. Franklin House =

Historic house in Tennessee, United States

- U.S. National Register of Historic Places
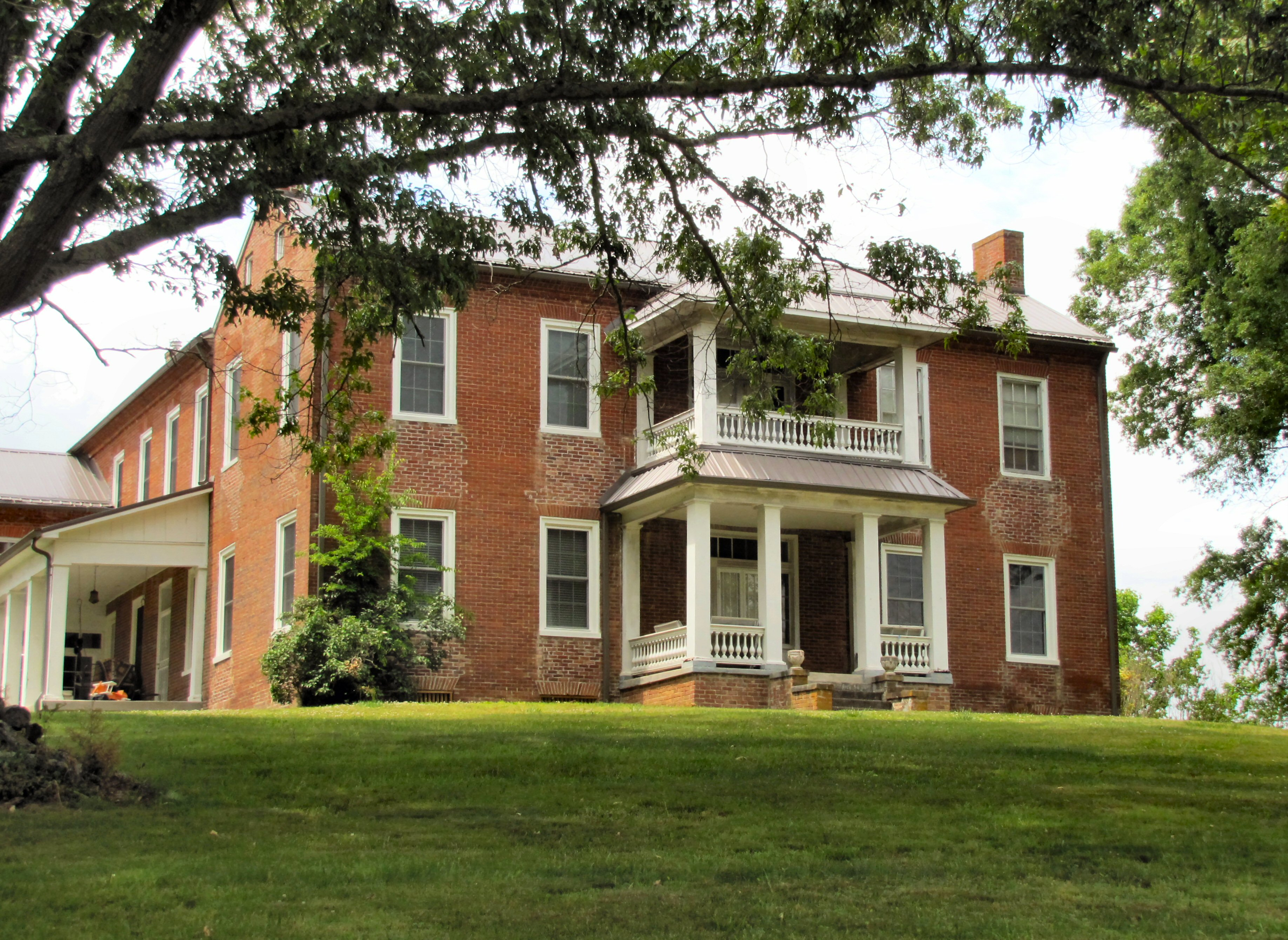
- The Lawson D. Franklin House in 2015

- Location within Tennessee Location within the United States
- Location: White Pine, Tennessee, U.S.
- Coordinates: 36°5′18″N 83°15′35″W
- Area: 9 acres (3.6 ha)
- Built: 1835-1840
- NRHP reference No.: 73001796
- Added to NRHP: April 13, 1973

The Lawson D. Franklin House is a historic mansion in White Pine, Tennessee, United States.

== History ==
The mansion was built in 1835–1840 for Lawson D. Franklin, Tennessee's first millionaire.

== Architectural significance ==
It has been listed on the National Register of Historic Places since April 13, 1973.
