= Mike D'Amato =

American football player (1941–2023)

No. 47
- Position: Defensive back

Personal information
- Born: March 3, 1941; Brooklyn, New York, U.S.
- Died: November 22, 2023 (aged 82); Florida, U.S.
- Listed height: 6 ft 2 in (1.88 m)
- Listed weight: 205 lb (93 kg)

Career information
- High school: Brooklyn Tech
- College: Hofstra
- NFL draft: 1968: 10th round, 264th overall pick

Career history
- New York Jets (1968)

Awards and highlights
- Super Bowl champion (III); AFL champion (1968)

Career AFL statistics
- Fumble recoveries: 1
- Stats at Pro Football Reference

Michael Anthony D'Amato (March 3, 1941 – November 22, 2023) was an American professional football defensive back. A safety, he played college football at Hofstra University, and played in the American Football League (AFL) for the New York Jets in the 1968 season. That season, the Jets defeated the Oakland Raiders in the AFL Championship game, and went on to humble the heavily favored NFL champion Baltimore Colts in the third AFL-NFL World Championship game (retroactively known as Super Bowl III). He followed Jets center John Schmitt as the second Hofstra alumnus to play for the team. D'Amato was also Hofstra's Special Assistant to the President for Alumni Affairs.

Hofstra University honored D'Amato in 2009 when it named the Football and Lacrosse Traditions Project in honor of D'Amato and Lou DiBlassi. The project was a gift from Hofstra benefactor James Metzger. According to Metzger, a former lacrosse All-American himself, D'Amato is "the only person to have been both a lacrosse All-American and a member of a Super Bowl winning team" and "bleeds Hofstra blue and gold". D'Amato was a football and lacrosse all-conference selection at Hofstra and is one of only four Hofstra alumni to ever earn a Super Bowl ring. In 2004 Hofstra honored D'Amato with the Joseph M. Margiotta Distinguished Service Award.

D'Amato died on November 22, 2023, at the age of 82. His nephew, John Paci, also spent time with the Jets.

== See also ==
- Other American Football League players
