= Bush Brothers and Company =

American food processing corporation

Bush Brothers & Company
- Type: Private
- Industry: Food processing
- Founded: 1908; 118 years ago, in Chestnut Hill, Tennessee, U.S.
- Founder: Andrew Jackson Bush
- Headquarters: Knoxville, Tennessee, U.S.
- Key people: Al Williams (chairman and CEO)
- Website: bushbeans.com

Bush Brothers and Company is a US family-owned corporation best known for its Bush's Best brand canned baked beans. The company produces approximately 80 percent of the canned baked beans consumed in the United States, representing estimated annual sales in excess of $400 million and the processing of more than 55 million pounds of beans per year. The company also sells other canned beans (black, garbanzo, pinto, and refried), peas, hominy, and cut green beans. Based in Knoxville, Tennessee, Bush Brothers operates plants in Augusta, Wisconsin, and Chestnut Hill, Tennessee. Its canned goods are sold through retail food outlets and food service operators throughout the United States and Canada.

== History ==
In 1904, A.J. (Andrew Jackson) Bush entered a partnership with the Stokely family to open a tomato cannery in Chestnut Hill, Tennessee. His cannery proved so profitable that, by 1908, he was able to buy out the Stokely family interest and establish his own independent business. He entered into partnership with his two oldest sons, Fred and Claude, and established Bush Brothers & Company.

=== Incorporation and expansion (1922–1935) ===
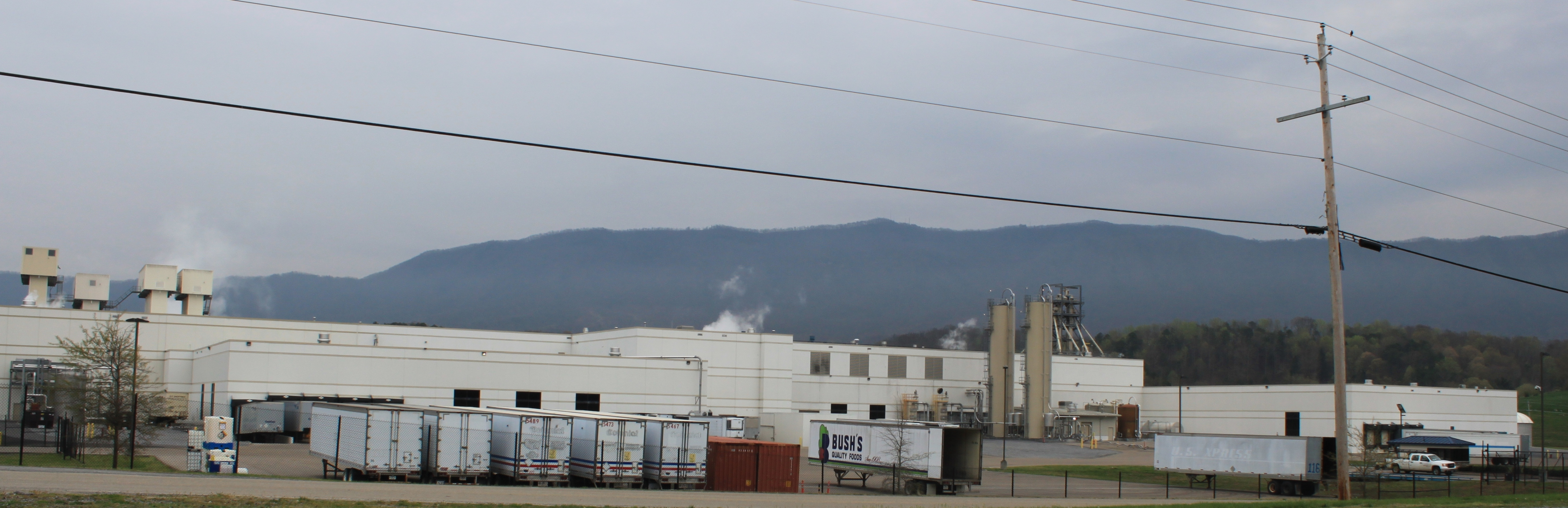
Bush cannery, Chestnut Hill, Tennessee

In 1922, A.J. Bush took out a US$945 loan on his life insurance policy and used his bank line of credit to incorporate his business. Bush Brothers & Company was incorporated in June 1922, and Fred Bush, A.J.'s oldest son, was named president. Fred was also a director of the National Canners Association, the primary industry trade group for canning companies.

The company's canning operations originally began with laborious, manual processes, then expanded with steam-powered engines, eventually using electric-powered factory machinery.

During the 1920s, Bush Brothers & Company began expanding its operations to include products other than tomatoes. The company constructed a small canning factory in Clinton, Tennessee, in 1923, and began canning both tomatoes and peaches in 1924. In 1928 the company expanded into corn and hominy, and leased the Smith Brothers & Company's Oak Grove corn processing plant just outside Dandridge, Tennessee. In 1930, Bush Brothers opened a new plant in LaFollette, Tennessee, where it processed blueberries in addition to tomatoes.

As the company continued to grow, the original cannery in Chestnut Hill became insufficient to meet its needs. Bush Brothers constructed a new building nearby in 1929, which became the company's main canning facilities for many years.

In 1933, Bush Brothers began offering pork and beans, canned under its Chestnut Hill label. The success of their product led to a contract with Armour and Company and to a wide array of canned meats. The company also started up a canning line for Tony Dog and Cat Food, which it continued to sell until the 1980s.

By 1935, Bush Brothers were seeing significant expansion and were highlighted in newspaper articles for producing ten million cans of vegetables a year, operating 2,000 acres of company-owned farmland, and contracting with 500 farmers to supply vegetables.

=== Properties lost to Tennessee Valley Authority (1942–1948) ===
In 1942, the Tennessee Valley Authority (TVA) announced the closing of the Douglas Dam floodgates within the year. The end result would be the flooding of the French Broad River bottom, where Bush Brothers had a number of farms. After several months of negotiation, Bush Brothers & Company agreed to sell seven prime tracts of their farmland to the TVA, as well as the Oak Grove Canning Plant.

In October 1944, Bush Brothers attempted to offset some of their farmland loss by purchasing the Blytheville Canning Company in Arkansas. However, the plant was in bad shape and struggled during its first four years of Bush ownership. Claude Bush moved to Arkansas in 1948 to oversee the facilities, and eventually managed to make it profitable.

=== Expansion and change (1946–1965) ===
Following A.J. Bush's death in 1946, Bush Brothers & Company made the move from private label to branded presence. They began offering their goods under the newly developed Bush's Best logo and label. With the advents of supermarkets and television advertising, the 1950s proved very profitable for the company. During this time, they continued to offer a variety of canned vegetables, particularly green beans. They also began offering the dry bean products for which they would eventually become known. In 1952, the company introduced their Great Northern Beans with Plain Sauce. This was followed in 1953 by Mexican Style Beans in Chili Gravy.

Claude Bush became president of the company in 1959, following the death of his older brother Fred. Bush Brothers & Company had amassed a substantial amount of cash and accounts receivable under Fred, and Claude felt the money would best be put to use expanding the company's business into new areas. The 1960s saw the purchase of several canning plants, including Shiocton Kraut Company (Shiocton, Wisconsin), Hyde Park Canning Company (Muskogee, Oklahoma), an unused canning plant in Augusta, Wisconsin, and Valley Canning Sweet Potato plants in Ville Platte and Cecilia, Louisiana. Bush Brothers & Company also created its own truck line, Tennessee Truck Lines, in 1962.

In 1965, Claude became chairman of the board, and brother-in-law C.J. Ethier succeeded him as President.

=== Bush's Best Baked Beans (1969–1978) ===
The year 1969 proved to be difficult for the canning industry due to overproduction and low prices. As the family stockholders considered their options and discussed strategies for riding out the tough times ahead, Claude's son Condon Bush decided to offer a new product to keep his Augusta plant busy during the off-season. Following the company's earlier success with pork and beans, Condon developed a baked bean product based on his mother Kathleen's recipe.

The experiment proved far more successful than expected. Sales of Bush's Best Baked Beans went from 10,000 cases in 1969 to 100,000 in 1970, eventually hitting close to a million cases in 1971. Baked beans became very popular during the United States Bicentennial, and Bush Brothers decided to devote all of their resources to Bush's Best Baked Beans sales. Their campaign was a success, with sales increasing by 173% in 1976, and a further 34% in 1977.

In 1978, Claude stepped down as chairman of the board, and C.J. Ethier replaced him. Condon was elected as the new president of Bush Brothers & Company.

=== Acquisition of Dubon (1979–1993) ===
In 1979, Bush Brothers acquired the Dubon brand of canned foods after Dubon became bankrupt. Canned vegetables such as carrots, peas, and beets are sold primarily in the Louisiana and New Orleans areas as a regional brand.

Throughout the 1980s, Bush Brothers continued to make its transition to a branded producer of table-ready products. However, the shift was slow and fraught with tension as the family had trouble agreeing on the best course of action. After the death of C.J. Ethier in 1989 and Claude Bush in 1990, Jim Ethier (C.J.'s son) convinced Condon (president and CEO) and Allen Bush (vice president of sales) to consult with Leon Danco of the Center for Family Business. Under Danco's guidance, Bush Brothers & Company reorganized its board of directors to include members from outside the family and the company. The restructured Board included Jay Carr (The Hershey Company), Bob Johnston (Gerber Products Company), Bill Trubeck (White & Case), and Clay Mathile (The Iams Company).

With the new board in place, the company turned to the task of hiring professional sales managers. Office space in Chestnut Hill was filled to capacity, and the prospect of recruiting young, urban managers to such a rural location seemed unlikely. In 1991, Bush Brothers & Company moved its company headquarters to Knoxville, Tennessee.

In 1992, Jim Ethier was elected president and COO of Bush Brothers & Company. Condon Bush moved to the position of CEO and chairman of the board.

=== Jay Bush (and Duke) (1993–present) ===
In 1993, Bush Brothers & Company hired a small advertising company in Atlanta, Georgia, called Cole, Henderson, Drake (CHD) to develop a new advertising campaign for their line of baked beans. The new ad focused on the "secret family recipe", and introduced Jay Bush (Condon's son) as the company's spokesperson. The ad performed well in test markets in 1993, and was released nationally in May 1994.

In the summer 1995, a new ad paired Jay up with a mischievous, talking golden retriever named Duke. Modeled after Bush's real-life pet golden retriever of the same name at the time (the dog itself experienced stage fright and was not properly camera-trained), the campaign was created by CHD copywriter David Garzotto and was a huge hit for Bush Brothers, who saw a dramatic spike in baked bean sales. The popularity of the company's baked beans can be directly attributed to the success of the Jay Bush and Duke commercials; as well as its catchphrase "Roll that beautiful bean footage!" to market their products, which are made according to the secret family recipe with specially cured bacon, brown sugar, and a secret blend of spices. All the while, Jay is able to keep Duke from selling the secret family recipe, another running gag in the ads. As a result of the ad campaign, the duo became celebrities, and sales of the company's beans increased from a 48% national market share to 80%. The popularity of the commercial inspired the company to publish a children's book, Duke Finds a Home, published in 2006.

In 2012, comedian Julie Klausner tweeted a suggestion that Bush Brothers offer a poetry contest, allowing the winner to pet Duke, who she had seen in a television commercial. The request was reiterated by numerous individuals on various social media sites and inspired an informal online petition to the company.

On June 27, 2018, Sam, one of the dogs who played Duke on screen, was put to sleep after being diagnosed with cancer. The role had already been recast several years before his death.

== Recent years ==
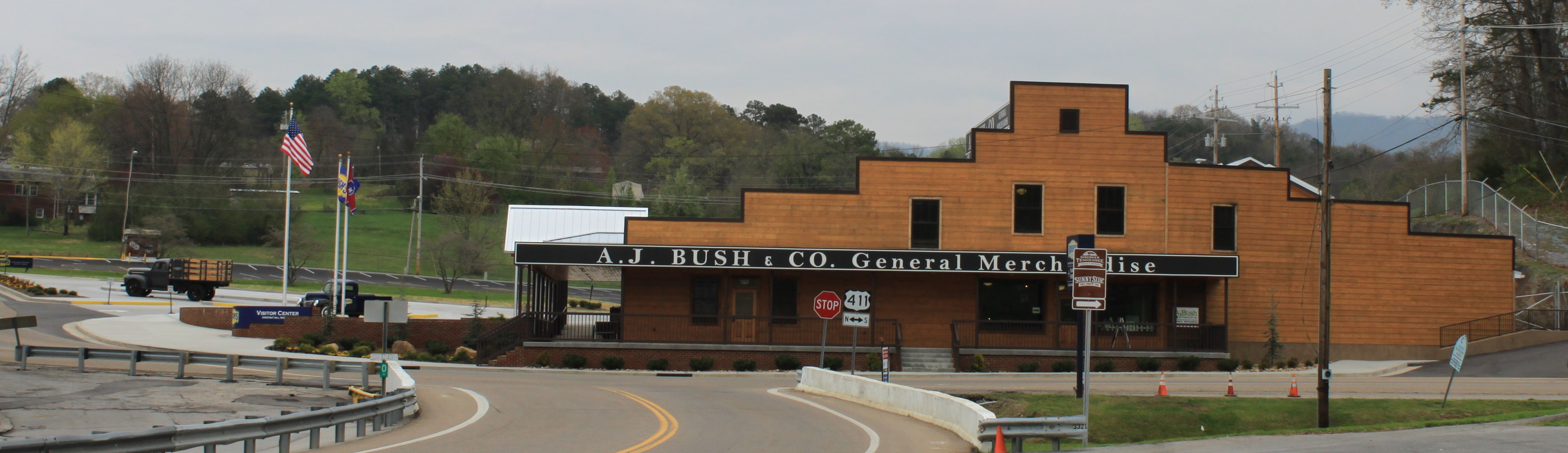
Bush Visitor Center, Chestnut Hill, Tennessee

The new Bush Visitor Center is an expansion from founder A.J. Bush's original General Store in Chestnut Hill, Tennessee, and includes a museum, retail shop and café. It also houses the guarded display of the "Bush's Secret Family Recipe" book.

Bush's Racing sponsor the Monster Energy NASCAR Cup Series #47 Chevy Camaro of JTG Daugherty Racing team, formerly driven by Bobby Labonte, and now driven by Ricky Stenhouse Jr.

Bush Brothers and Company also sponsors the annual Bean and Bacon Days festival in Augusta, Wisconsin, where the company acquired the old Augusta canning factory in 1961.

On Oprah, in 2009, Kristian Bush, great-grandson of A.J. Bush and half of the band Sugarland, mentioned that he no longer liked beans because he grew up on them.

=== Legal Issues ===
==== Employee Workplace Deaths ====
- 2018- An employee was killed when a machine cycled while the employee was cleaning inside and crushed them inside the lifting mechanism.
- 2020 - Employee Mary Falk was killed when a 2,000 pound super sack container was damaged and fell onto the employee. Lawsuits were brought by Falk's children against Bush Brothers and the company's insurer Sentry Casualty Co.. OSHA issued fines of $10,931 for violation of material handling requirements.

==== Food Quality Recalls ====
- 2017 - Multiple flavors of product in the 28oz can size were recalled for defective can seams allowing potential harmful bacteria to grow inside the cans. The defect was caused by the supplier of the cans, however, in a warning letter issued by the FDA to then plant director Joseph Breid, multiple process failures were noted, including failure to report the distribution of known defective food products, failure to perform correct actions after identifying the issue, and failure to stop production when employees reported finding hazardous defects.

==== Tax Evasion ====
- 1982 - Company president C.J. Ethier initiated a scheme to pay shareholder dividends in open contracts for dry beans with multiple bean suppliers the company regularly transacted with. Immediately after the contracts were issued to the Bush family shareholders, they were sold back to the bean suppliers at a higher price, shielding the company from paying taxes on the new higher income. The beans were never moved during this process, and the same types of beans were purchased again shortly after the sales, leading the courts to rule that the entire process was simply a tax avoidance device and not conducted as a practical business operation.

== Brands ==
- Bush's
- Bush's Best
- Bush's Showboat Pork and Beans
- Blue Lake Cut Green Beans
- Ithaca Hummus
- Tony Dog Food
- Tony Dog and Cat Food
- Dubon Premier
- Valley Gem

== See also ==
- List of food companies
- Baked beans
- Beans
- Canning
- Diarrhea Planet; drummer Ian Bush is a member of the Bush family
- List of American advertising characters
- List of mascots
- National Canners Association
