= Fairvue (Jefferson City, Tennessee) =

Historic house in Tennessee, United States

- U.S. National Register of Historic Places
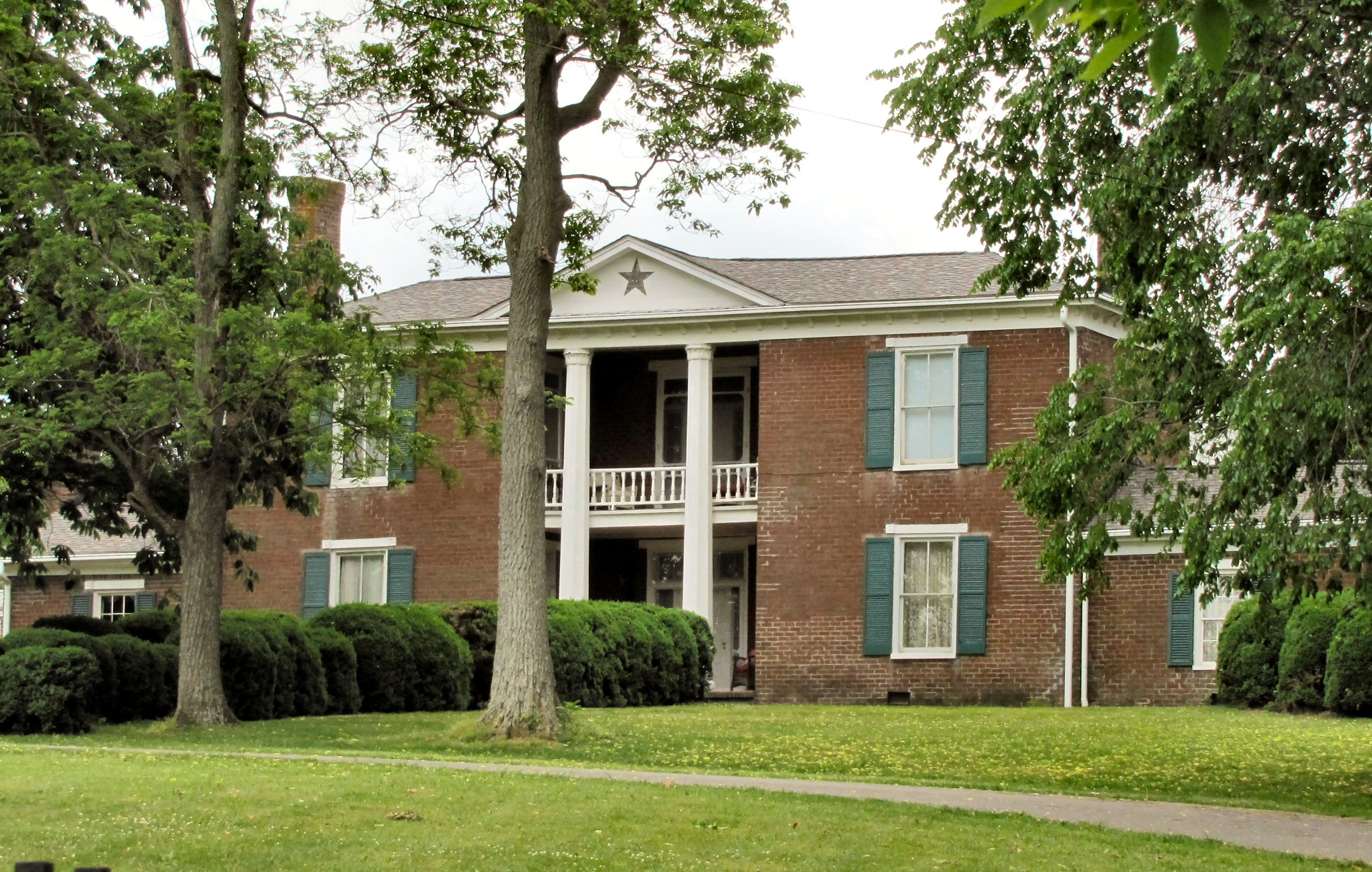

- Location within Tennessee Location within the United States
- Nearest city: Jefferson City, Tennessee
- Coordinates: 36°8′27″N 83°27′50″W
- Area: 2.9 acres (1.2 ha)
- Built: 1850
- Built by: Stokeley Donelson Williams
- Architectural style: Roman Classicism
- NRHP reference No.: 82003978
- Added to NRHP: April 12, 1982

Fairvue or Fairview is a historic farmhouse and farm property in Jefferson County, Tennessee, near Jefferson City.

The house was built in 1850 in a Roman Classical Revival style by its owner, Stokeley Donelson Williams. The name Fairvue was chosen to describe the property's setting, which provides an expansive view of farmland and mountains.

In 1894, the farm was sold to Carrie James. It has remained in the family ever since, and is designated a century farm. Agricultural activities on the 370-acre (150 ha) farm include production of beef cattle, hay, wheat, and corn. The house was listed on the National Register of Historic Places in 1982.
