= Chestnut Hill, Tennessee =

Chestnut Hill
- Unincorporated community
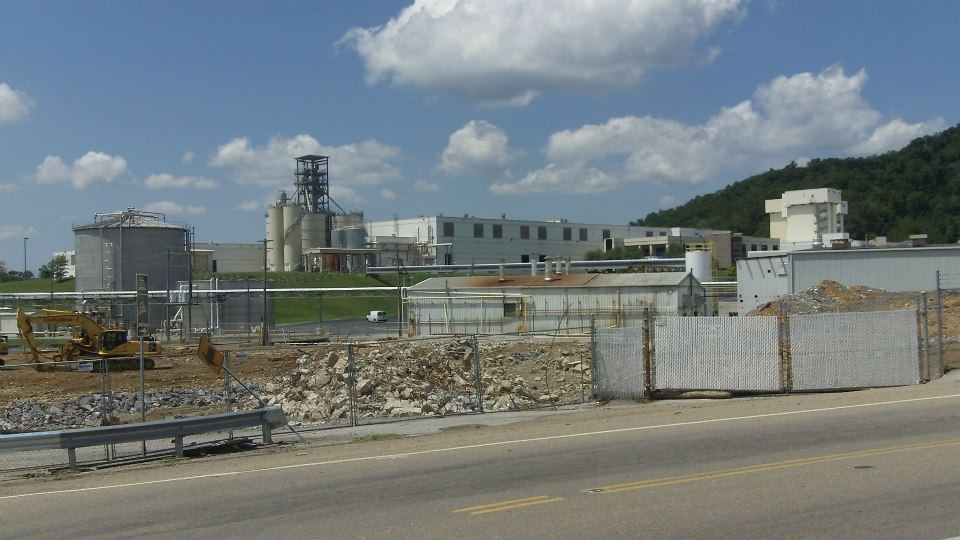
- Bush Brothers cannery facility in Chestnut Hill

- Location within Tennessee Location within the United States
- Coordinates: 35°58′8″N 83°18′54″W
- Country: United States
- State: Tennessee
- County: Jefferson
- Elevation: 1,079 ft (329 m)
- Time zone: UTC-5 (Eastern (EST))
  - Summer (DST): UTC-4 (EDT)
- ZIP code: 37725
- Area code: 865
- GNIS feature ID: 1305891

Chestnut Hill is an unincorporated community located in central-southern Jefferson County, Tennessee.

== Economy ==
Chestnut Hill is the site of one of two canneries for the Bush Brothers and Company, which has a visitors' center in the community.
