= James Guidry =

American football player (born 1967)

Profile
- Position: Quarterback

Personal information
- Born: March 12, 1967 (age 59)
- Listed height: 6 ft 1 in (1.85 m)
- Listed weight: 195 lb (88 kg)

Career information
- College: Texas A&I

Career history
- Detroit Drive (1993); Dallas Texans (1993); Milwaukee Mustangs (1996); Florida Bobcats (1996); Anaheim Piranhas (1997); Portland Forest Dragons (1998–1999)

Awards and highlights
- AFL Most Inspirational Player of the Year (1999)

Career AFL statistics
- Comp. / Att.: 365 / 636
- Passing yards: 4,863
- TD–INT: 97–27
- Passer rating: 102.21
- Rushing TDs: 4
- Stats at ArenaFan.com

James Guidry (born March 12, 1967) is an American former professional football quarterback who played five seasons in the Arena Football League (AFL) with the Dallas Texans, Milwaukee Mustangs, Florida Bobcats, Anaheim Piranhas and Portland Forest Dragons. He played college football at Texas A&I University. He was also a member of the Detroit Drive.

== Early life and college ==
James Guidry was born on March 12, 1967. He was a three-year letterman for the Texas A&I Javelinas football of Texas A&I University from 1986 to 1988.

== Professional career ==
In August 1990, it was reported that Guidry had signed with a team in Barcelona, Spain.

Guidry was a member of the Detroit Drive during the 1993 Arena Football League season.

Guidry was traded to the Dallas Texans in June 1993.

After playing in Europe for several years, Guidry signed with the Milwaukee Mustangs in April 1996.

Guidry played for the Florida Bobcats in 1996.

Guidry was traded to the Anaheim Piranhas in March 1997. He was released by the Piranhas in April 1997.

Guidry played for the Portland Forest Dragons from 1998 to 1999. He recorded 87 touchdowns on 4,069 passing yards during his time with the Forest Dragons. His playing career ended when he was knocked unconscious after being blindsided in the end zone for a sack during a game on May 8, 1999. He spent six days in the hospital after the hit to his spinal cord and was partially paralyzed on his left side until undergoing surgery. Guidry was named the AFL's Most Inspirational Player of the Year in 1999.
