= Jefferson County, Tennessee =

County in Tennessee, United States

- County
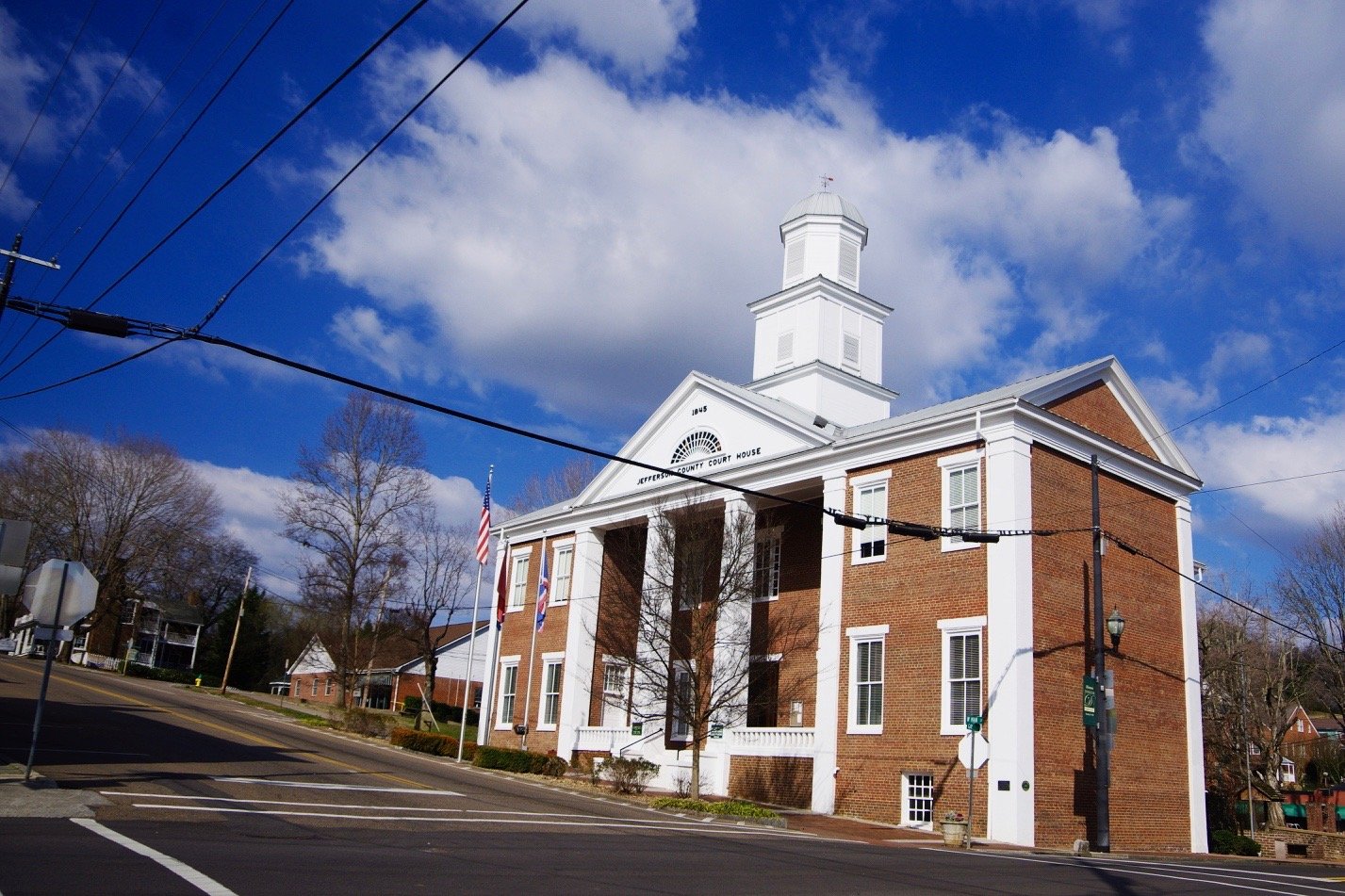
- Jefferson County Courthouse in Dandridge

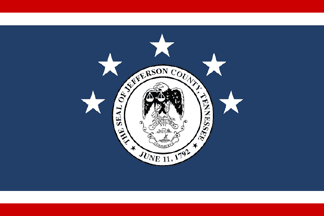
- Flag Seal

- Location within the U.S. state of Tennessee
- Coordinates: 36°03′N 83°27′W
- Country: United States
- State: Tennessee
- Founded: June 15, 1792
- Named for: Thomas Jefferson
- Seat: Dandridge
- Largest city: Jefferson City

Government
  - Mayor: Mark Potts (R)

Area
  - Total: 314 sq mi (810 km^{2})
  - Land: 274 sq mi (710 km^{2})
  - Water: 40 sq mi (100 km^{2}) 13%

Population (2020)
  - Total: 54,683
  - Estimate (2025): 60,024 ▲
  - Density: 200/sq mi (77.1/km^{2})
- Time zone: UTC−5 (Eastern)
  - Summer (DST): UTC−4 (EDT)
- ZIP Codes: 37725, 37760, 37820, 37871, 37877, 37890
- Area code: 865
- Congressional districts: 1st, 2nd
- Website: jeffersoncountytn.gov

Jefferson County is an exurban county located in the U.S. state of Tennessee. As of the 2020 census, the population was 54,683. Its county seat is Dandridge. Jefferson County is part of the Morristown Metropolitan Statistical Area with neighboring Grainger and Hamblen counties. The county, along with the Morristown MSA, is included in the Knoxville–Morristown–Sevierville Combined Statistical Area.

== History ==
Jefferson County was established on June 11, 1792, by William Blount, Governor of the Southwest Territory. It had been a part of Caswell County during the State of Franklin period (1784–1789). Its county seat, Dandridge, was settled in 1783.

On the eve of the Civil War, Jefferson County, like most other counties in mountainous East Tennessee, was opposed to secession. In Tennessee's Ordinance of Secession referendum on June 8, 1861, Jefferson County voters rejected secession by a margin of 1,987 to 603. A railroad bridge at Strawberry Plains was among those targeted by the East Tennessee bridge-burning conspiracy in November 1861. This led to internal conflict in the area throughout the war, with men from the county enlisting in both of the rival armies.

On October 2, 2013, on I-40 in Jefferson County near the I-40 and I-81 split, a multi-vehicle collision involving a church bus, a tractor-trailer, and a SUV occurred at mile marker 423. Tennessee Highway Patrol officials discovered that the church bus had blown a tire, leading it to merge into oncoming traffic, clipping the SUV and colliding with the semi-truck, causing it to burst into flames. The accident resulted in 8 fatalities and 14 injuries.

In 2013, Jefferson County officials explored developing an 1,800-acre megasite north of the I-81/I-40 junction outside of Dandridge to attract major manufacturers to locate to the county, following the successful efforts in Chattanooga with a Volkswagen assembly plant and in Smyrna with a Nissan assembly plant. The project was later cancelled following an organized opposition group by local farmers and the lack of financial support from federal and Tennessee state government agencies.

== Politics ==
United States presidential election results for Jefferson County, Tennessee
Year	Republican		Democratic		Third party(ies)	
Year	No.	%	No.	%	No.	%
1912	540	26.96%	514	25.66%	949	47.38%
1916	1,648	75.84%	520	23.93%	5	0.23%
1920	3,583	81.58%	741	16.87%	68	1.55%
1924	2,699	78.39%	712	20.68%	32	0.93%
1928	2,582	85.55%	436	14.45%	0	0.00%
1932	2,275	68.59%	975	29.39%	67	2.02%
1936	2,356	68.33%	1,079	31.29%	13	0.38%
1940	1,921	63.95%	1,062	35.35%	21	0.70%
1944	3,159	76.25%	966	23.32%	18	0.43%
1948	2,979	74.12%	900	22.39%	140	3.48%
1952	4,622	78.87%	1,228	20.96%	10	0.17%
1956	4,870	77.63%	1,338	21.33%	65	1.04%
1960	6,141	78.79%	1,620	20.79%	33	0.42%
1964	4,923	65.44%	2,600	34.56%	0	0.00%
1968	5,494	67.11%	1,494	18.25%	1,199	14.65%
1972	5,925	80.26%	1,357	18.38%	100	1.35%
1976	5,459	57.23%	3,995	41.89%	84	0.88%
1980	6,944	66.82%	3,180	30.60%	268	2.58%
1984	7,721	70.35%	3,185	29.02%	69	0.63%
1988	6,832	67.85%	3,168	31.46%	69	0.69%
1992	6,184	50.02%	4,740	38.34%	1,438	11.63%
1996	6,446	53.03%	4,688	38.57%	1,021	8.40%
2000	8,657	61.45%	5,226	37.10%	204	1.45%
2004	11,625	67.53%	5,469	31.77%	121	0.70%
2008	13,092	70.65%	5,178	27.94%	262	1.41%
2012	13,038	74.25%	4,232	24.10%	289	1.65%
2016	14,776	77.47%	3,494	18.32%	802	4.21%
2020	18,651	78.98%	4,654	19.71%	311	1.32%
2024	21,068	81.61%	4,503	17.44%	244	0.95%

== Geography ==
According to the U.S. Census Bureau, the county has a total area of 314 square miles (810 km^{2}), of which 274 square miles (710 km^{2}) is land and 40 square miles (100 km^{2}) (13%) is water. The county is affected by two artificial lakes: Douglas Lake, created by the damming of the French Broad River in the south, and Cherokee Lake, created by the damming of the Holston River in the north.

=== Adjacent counties ===
- Hamblen County (northeast)
- Cocke County (southeast)
- Sevier County (south)
- Knox County (west)
- Grainger County (north)

=== State protected areas ===
- Henderson Island Refuge

=== Transportation ===
==== Principal highways ====
- I-40
- I-81
- US 11E
- US 25E
- US 25W
- US 70
- US 411
- SR 9
- SR 32
- SR 34
- SR 35
- SR 66
- SR 92

==== Major surface routes ====
- SR 113
- SR 139
- SR 341
- SR 363

== Demographics ==
Historical population
Census	Pop.	Note	%±
1810	7,309		—
1820	8,953		22.5%
1830	11,801		31.8%
1840	12,076		2.3%
1850	13,204		9.3%
1860	16,043		21.5%
1870	19,476		21.4%
1880	15,846		−18.6%
1890	16,478		4.0%
1900	18,590		12.8%
1910	17,755		−4.5%
1920	17,677		−0.4%
1930	17,914		1.3%
1940	18,621		3.9%
1950	19,667		5.6%
1960	21,493		9.3%
1970	24,940		16.0%
1980	31,284		25.4%
1990	33,016		5.5%
2000	44,294		34.2%
2010	51,407		16.1%
2020	54,683		6.4%
2025 (est.)	60,024	▲	9.8%
U.S. Decennial Census; 1790-1960 1900-1990; 1990-2000 2010-2014

=== Racial and ethnic composition ===
Jefferson County, Tennessee – Racial and ethnic composition Note: the US Census treats Hispanic/Latino as an ethnic category. This table excludes Latinos from the racial categories and assigns them to a separate category. Hispanics/Latinos may be of any race.
Race / Ethnicity (NH = Non-Hispanic)	Pop 1980	Pop 1990	Pop 2000	Pop 2010	Pop 2020	% 1980	% 1990	% 2000	% 2010	% 2020
White alone (NH)	30,114	31,862	42,102	47,738	48,975	96.26%	96.50%	95.05%	92.86%	89.56%
Black or African American alone (NH)	920	926	1,016	1,031	787	2.94%	2.80%	2.29%	2.01%	1.44%
Native American or Alaska Native alone (NH)	46	75	119	152	159	0.15%	0.23%	0.27%	0.30%	0.29%
Asian alone (NH)	23	40	118	212	257	0.07%	0.12%	0.27%	0.41%	0.47%
Native Hawaiian or Pacific Islander alone (NH)	x	x	9	11	20	x	x	0.02%	0.02%	0.04%
Other race alone (NH)	19	13	28	55	157	0.06%	0.04%	0.06%	0.11%	0.29%
Mixed race or Multiracial (NH)	x	x	314	589	1,936	x	x	0.71%	1.15%	3.54%
Hispanic or Latino (any race)	162	100	588	1,619	2,392	0.52%	0.30%	1.33%	3.15%	4.37%
Total	31,284	33,016	44,294	51,407	54,683	100.00%	100.00%	100.00%	100.00%	100.00%

=== 2020 census ===
As of the 2020 census, there were 54,683 people, 21,461 households, and 13,998 families residing in the county. The median age was 44.7 years, 20.0% of residents were under the age of 18, and 21.2% were 65 years of age or older. For every 100 females there were 95.6 males, and for every 100 females age 18 and over there were 93.8 males age 18 and over.

There were 21,461 households in the county, of which 27.4% had children under the age of 18 living in them. Of all households, 53.3% were married-couple households, 16.9% were households with a male householder and no spouse or partner present, and 23.6% were households with a female householder and no spouse or partner present. About 24.5% of all households were made up of individuals and 11.7% had someone living alone who was 65 years of age or older.

There were 24,828 housing units, of which 13.6% were vacant. Among occupied housing units, 75.4% were owner-occupied and 24.6% were renter-occupied. The homeowner vacancy rate was 1.2% and the rental vacancy rate was 9.7%.

The racial makeup of the county (where Hispanics are allocated amongst the various racial groups) was 90.6% White, 1.5% Black or African American, 0.3% American Indian and Alaska Native, 0.5% Asian, <0.1% Native Hawaiian and Pacific Islander, 2.3% from some other race, and 4.8% from two or more races. Hispanic or Latino residents of any race comprised 4.4% of the population.

24.2% of residents lived in urban areas, while 75.8% lived in rural areas.

=== 2000 census ===
As of the census of 2000, there were 44,294 people, 17,155 households, and 12,608 families residing in the county. The population density was 162 people per square mile (63 people/km^{2}). There were 19,319 housing units at an average density of 71 units per square mile (27/km^{2}). The racial makeup of the county was 95.66% White, 2.32% Black or African American, 0.31% Native American, 0.27% Asian, 0.04% Pacific Islander, 0.63% from other races, and 0.77% from two or more races. 1.33% of the population were Hispanic or Latino of any race.

There were 17,155 households, out of which 31.00% had children under the age of 18 living with them, 59.90% were married couples living together, 9.80% had a female householder with no husband present, and 26.50% were non-families. 22.50% of all households were made up of individuals, and 8.20% had someone living alone who was 65 years of age or older. The average household size was 2.49 and the average family size was 2.89.

In the county, the population was spread out, with 22.90% under the age of 18, 10.60% from 18 to 24, 29.10% from 25 to 44, 24.50% from 45 to 64, and 12.90% who were 65 years of age or older. The median age was 36 years. For every 100 females, there were 97.50 males. For every 100 females age 18 and over, there were 94.00 males. However, the last statistic is somewhat misleading because of female longevity, and if adults 18-65 were considered, the numbers would be very close to equal.

The median income for a household in the county was $32,824, and the median income for a family was $38,537. Males had a median income of $29,123 versus $20,269 for females. The per capita income for the county was $16,841. About 9.60% of families and 13.40% of the population were below the poverty line, including 16.90% of those under age 18 and 12.60% of those age 65 or over.

== Economy ==
According to a data profile produced by the Tennessee Department of Economic and Community Development in 2023, the top employers in the county are:

#	Employer	# of Employees
1	Old Dominion Freight Line	1,100
2	Jefferson County Board of Education	1,100
3	Bush Brothers and Company	500
4	Nyrstar	450
5	Carson–Newman University	404
6	Oshkosh Corporation	325
7	Jefferson Memorial Hospital	305
8	Jefferson County Government	300
9	Walmart (Jefferson City)	300
10	Ball MetalPack	159

== Education ==
K-12 public education in the county is conducted by Jefferson County Public Schools.

== Communities ==
=== Cities ===
- Baneberry
- Jefferson City
- Morristown (partial, mostly in Hamblen)

=== Towns ===
- Dandridge (county seat)
- New Market
- White Pine (small portion in Hamblen)

=== Census-designated place ===
- Strawberry Plains (partial, portions in Knox and Sevier)

=== Unincorporated communities ===
- Belmont
- Chestnut Hill
- Shady Grove
- Talbott (partial)

== See also ==
- National Register of Historic Places listings in Jefferson County, Tennessee
