= Bean Station, Tennessee =

Town in Tennessee, US

Bean Station
- Town
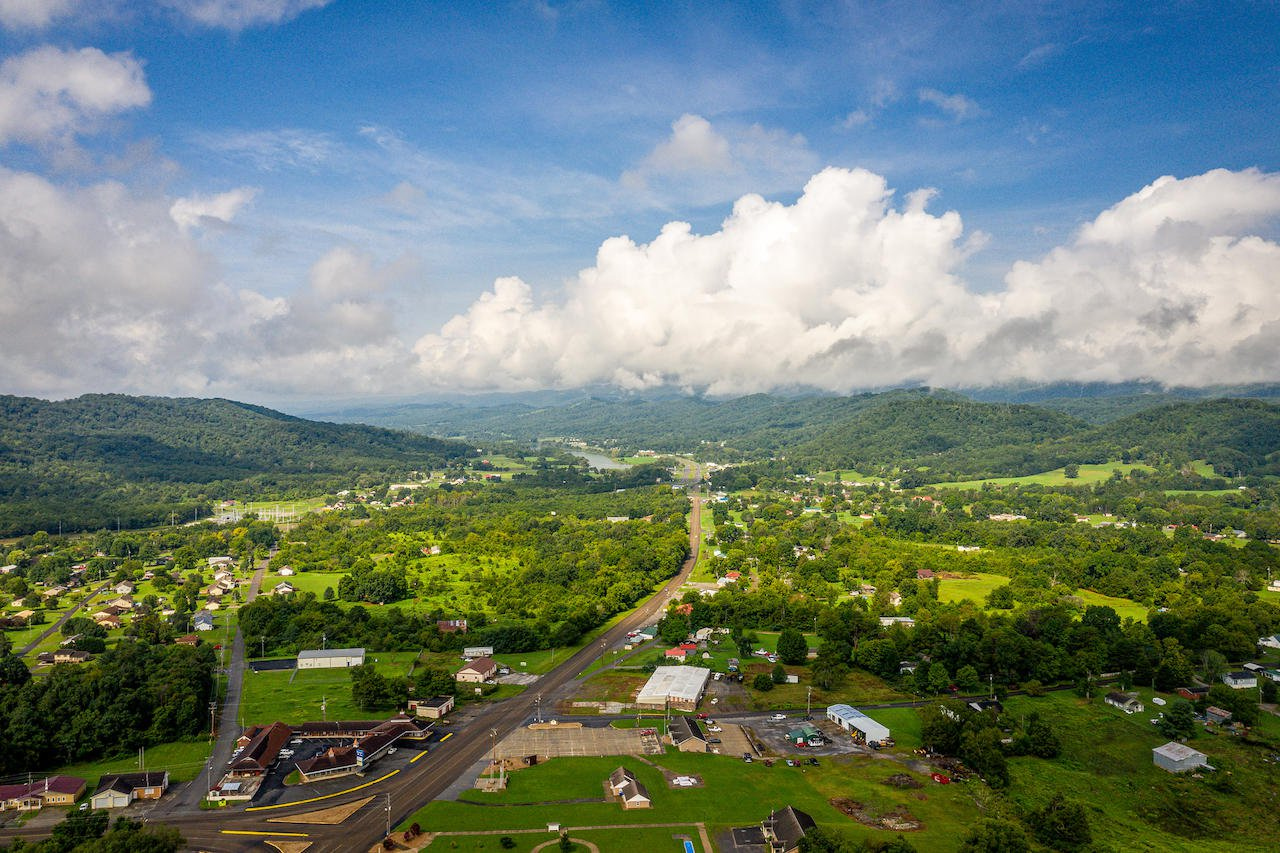
- Main Street (Old US 11W) in Bean Station

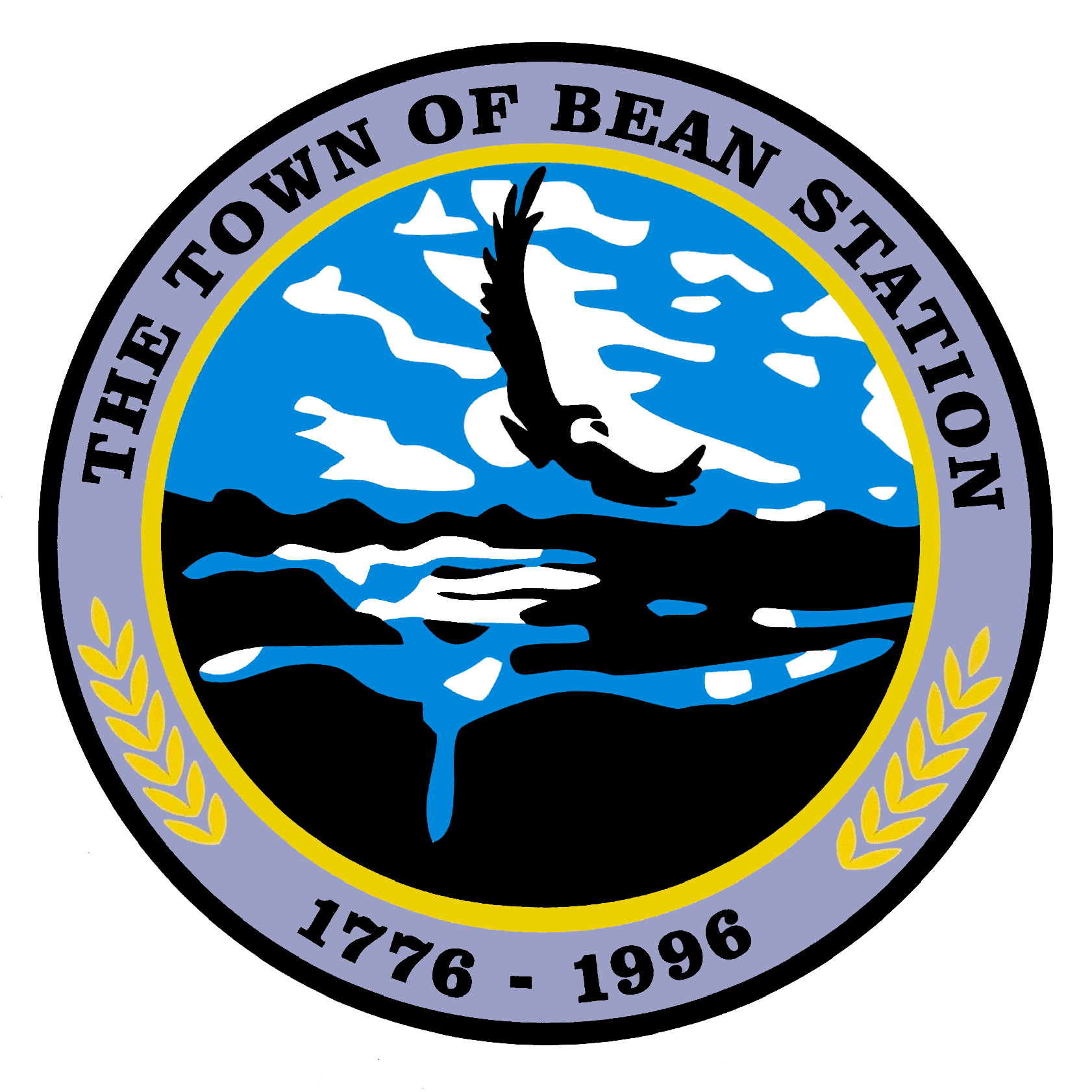
- Flag Seal
- Nicknames: The Crossroads, Firework Alley
- Motto: "A Historical Crossroad"
- Location of Bean Station in Grainger and Hawkins counties in Tennessee

- Location within Tennessee Location within the United States
- Coordinates: 36°20′37″N 83°17′03″W
- Country: United States
- State: Tennessee
- Counties: Grainger, Hawkins
- Founded: 1776
- Incorporated: 1996
- Founder: William Bean
- Named for: Bean family settlement

Government
  - Type: Mayor-council
  - Mayor: Bryan Baudouin
  - Vice Mayor: Jeff Atkins
  - Town Council: Aldermen: Mickey Ankrom; Eddie Douglas; Patsy Harrell; Jeff Atkins

Area
  - Total: 5.99 sq mi (15.52 km^{2})
  - Land: 5.99 sq mi (15.51 km^{2})
  - Water: 0.0039 sq mi (0.01 km^{2})
- Elevation: 1,112 ft (339 m)

Population (2020)
  - Total: 2,967
  - Density: 495.4/sq mi (191.27/km^{2})
- Time zone: UTC-5 (Eastern (EST))
  - Summer (DST): UTC-4 (EDT)
- ZIP code: 37708, 37811
- Area codes: 865, 423
- GNIS feature ID: 2403829
- FIPS code: 47-03760
- Website: https://www.beanstation.info/

Bean Station is a town located mostly in Grainger County, Tennessee, with a small portion in Hawkins County. As of the 2020 census, the population was 2,967. It is part of the Kingsport and Knoxville metropolitan statistical areas.

Pioneer William Bean established Bean Station in 1776 as a frontier outpost; it is considered one of the earliest permanently settled communities in Tennessee. During the 18th and 19th centuries, due to its strategic location at the crossroads of Daniel Boone's Wilderness Road and the Great Indian Warpath, the town grew to become an important stopover for early pioneers and settlers in the Appalachia region.

During the American Civil War, the town was the site of the final battle of the Knoxville campaign before Confederate forces surrendered to a Union blockade in nearby Blaine. In the early 20th century, Bean Station experienced renewed growth with the development of Tate Springs mineral springs resort, investment from U.S. Senator John K. Shields, and the construction of the Peavine Railroad which provided passenger rail services to Knoxville. In the 1940s, the Tennessee Valley Authority inundated the town as part of the construction of Cherokee Dam, and nearly all of the town's residents were removed via eminent domain and federal court orders. Following its inundation, the town was shifted to the new junction of U.S. Route 11W and U.S. Route 25E, becoming a popular lakeside community, and a commuter town for the city of Morristown in neighboring Hamblen County. Citing annexation attempts by Morristown, Bean Station was incorporated as a town in 1996.

== History ==
=== Early years ===
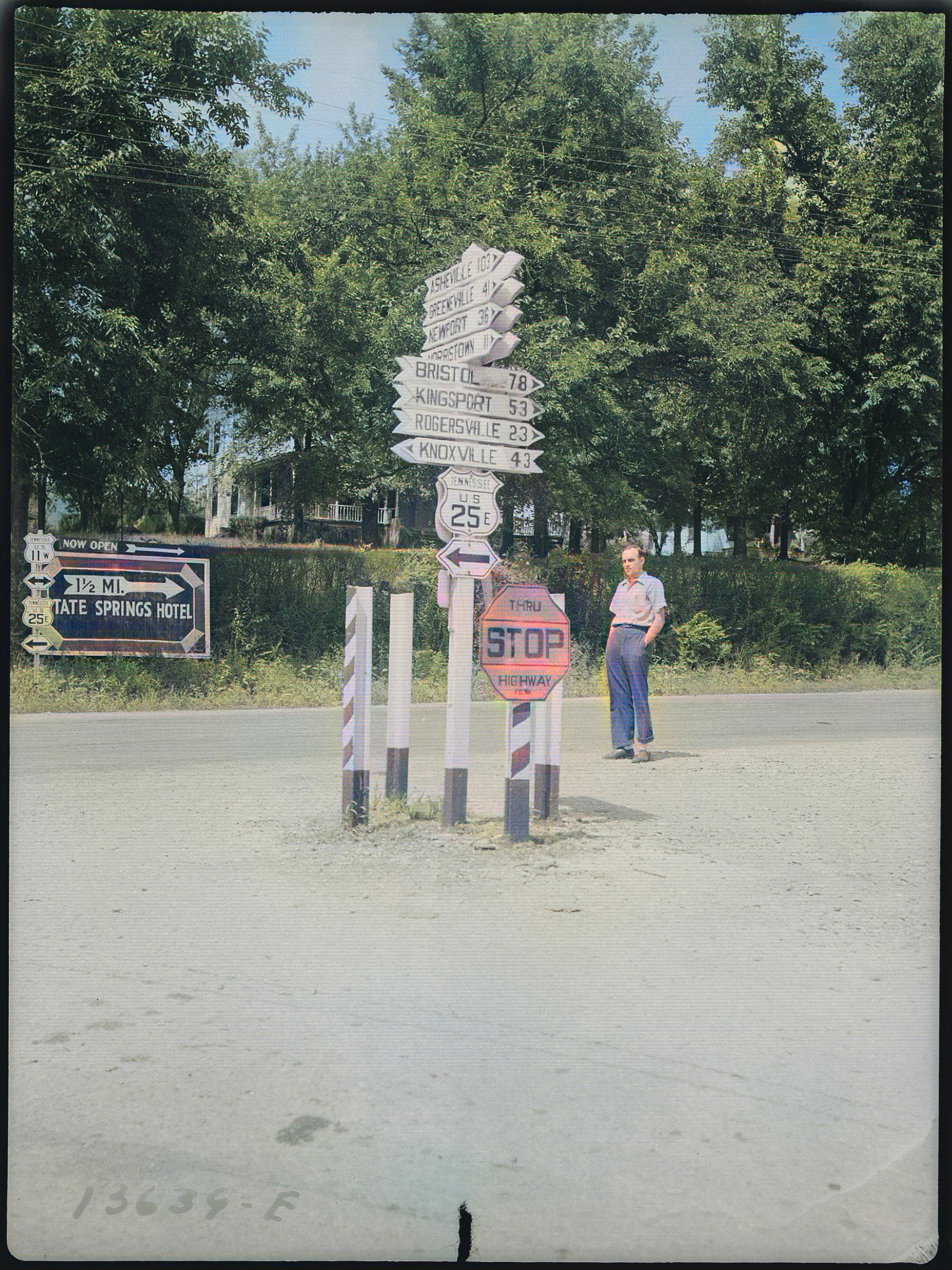
The crossroads of US 11W and US 25E in old Bean Station, circa 1942

In 1775, pioneers Daniel Boone and William Bean observed the future site of Bean Station from the top of Clinch Mountain while on a hunting-and-surveying excursion. During the American Revolutionary War, Bean served as a captain for the Virginia militia; in 1776, he was awarded over 3,000 acres (4.7 sq mi; 1,200 ha) in the German Creek valley, where he had earlier surveyed and camped with Boone. At this site, Bean later constructed a four-room cabin, which he used as both his family home and as an inn for prospective settlers, fur traders, and longhunters. The inn and its surrounding area were variously called Bean's Cabin, Bean's Crossroads, and Bean's Station. This area is believed to be the first permanently-settled European-American community in present-day Tennessee.

Following Bean's death in May 1782, his sons expanded the homestead into a frontier outpost that included the Bean family cabin, a tavern, and a blacksmith's shop they operated. The settlement was situated at the intersection of Wilderness Road, a north–south pathway constructed in the 1780s that roughly followed the present-day U.S. Route 25E; and the Great Indian Warpath, an east–west pathway that roughly followed what is now U.S. Route 11W. This heavily trafficked crossroads location made Bean Station an important stopover for early American travelers. Additional taverns and inns were operating at the station by the early 1800s. By 1821, the pathway of Wilderness Road from Cumberland Gap to Bean Station was established as the privately owned Bean Station Turnpike and received state funding due to its importance for early interstate travel in the Appalachia region.

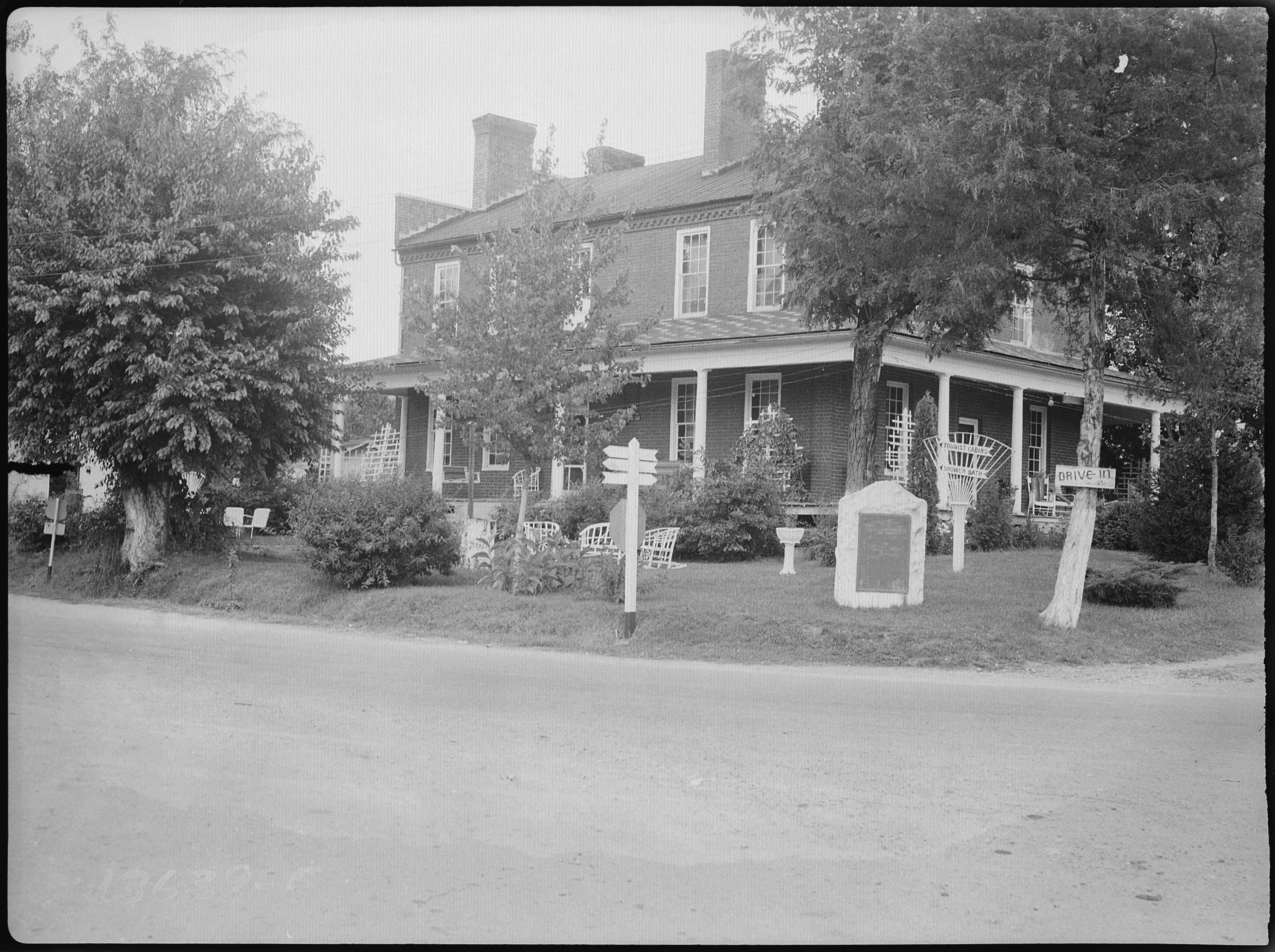
The remaining section of Bean Station Tavern before its dismantlement, circa 1942

Throughout the 1800s, Bean Station attracted the attention of merchants and businessmen. In 1825, Thomas Whiteside constructed Bean Station Tavern, a large tavern with a 40-room capacity, wine cellar, and ballroom. The tavern was one of the largest of its time between New Orleans and Washington, D.C.; the tavern housed several famous guests, including U.S. Presidents Andrew Jackson, Andrew Johnson, and James K. Polk. The main portion of the tavern was destroyed in a fire on the night of December 25, 1886.

=== Civil War and late 19th century ===
During the American Civil War, the Battle of Bean's Station took place in the westernmost area of the community on December 14, 1863. Confederate Army General James Longstreet attempted to capture Bean Station en route to Rogersville after failing to drive Union forces out of Knoxville. Bean Station was held by a contingent of Union Army soldiers under the command of General James M. Shackelford. After two days of fighting, Union forces were forced to retreat.

After the Civil War, businessman Samuel Tate constructed Tate Springs hotel west of Bean Station. In 1876, Captain Thomas Tomlinson, a Union army veteran who served in the Battle of Bean's Station, purchased the property and converted it into a resort complex, which included a large, Victorian-style luxury hotel and mineral spring that was purported to have healing properties. The resort attracted some of the wealthiest people in America but it declined during the Great Depression and closed in 1941. In 1943, the hotel site was redeveloped into a school and orphanage known as Kingswood. A fire destroyed the main hotel structure in 1963, and the only remnants of the complex were cabins, the pool bathhouse, and Tate Springs Springhouse, the last of which was listed on the National Register of Historic Places in 1973. As of 2024, the Kingswood orphanage at the site of Tate Springs remains operational.

=== Late 19th and early 20th centuries ===
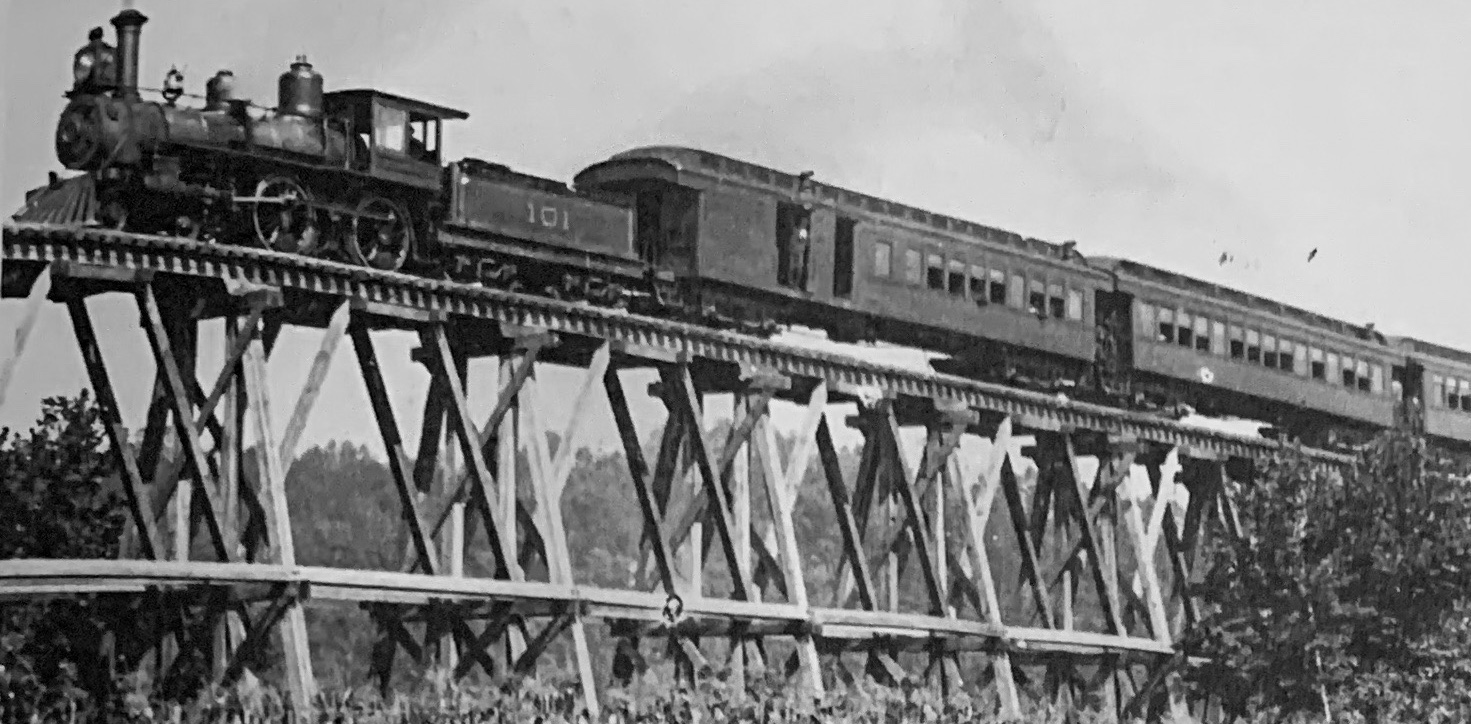
Peavine Railroad crossing the Holston River into Morristown

During the late 19th and early 20th centuries, Bean Station was a stop along the Knoxville and Bristol Railroad, which was commonly known by residents as the Peavine Railroad. The railroad was a branch line of the Southern Railway that ran from Morristown to Corryton, a bedroom community outside Knoxville. Construction of the railroad, which first operated between Morristown and Bean Station, was completed in 1893. The completion of the railroad influenced the formation of the Bean Station Improvement Company (BSIC), which was led by resident and former U.S. Senator John K. Shields with the intent of revitalizing the community. The BSIC laid the groundworks of a town street grid system, sold property for development, and promoted the community in widely distributed advertisements and brochures that highlighted the past, present, and future plans for the community. The company helped fund and propose plans to develop the town as an important multimodal distribution rail-and-road center, such as an extension of the Peavine Railroad across Clinch Mountain to Cumberland Gap, and northeast to Bristol. Both extension plans never came to fruition but rail access was extended west through Grainger County to Knoxville. The popularity of Tate Springs resort located in eastern Bean Station peaked between the 1890s and 1920s when the railroad provided passenger rail connections to the site. The railroad ended service in 1928 and the lines were either demolished or washed out following the inundation of the Holston River by the Tennessee Valley Authority in 1942.

==== TVA and community displacement ====
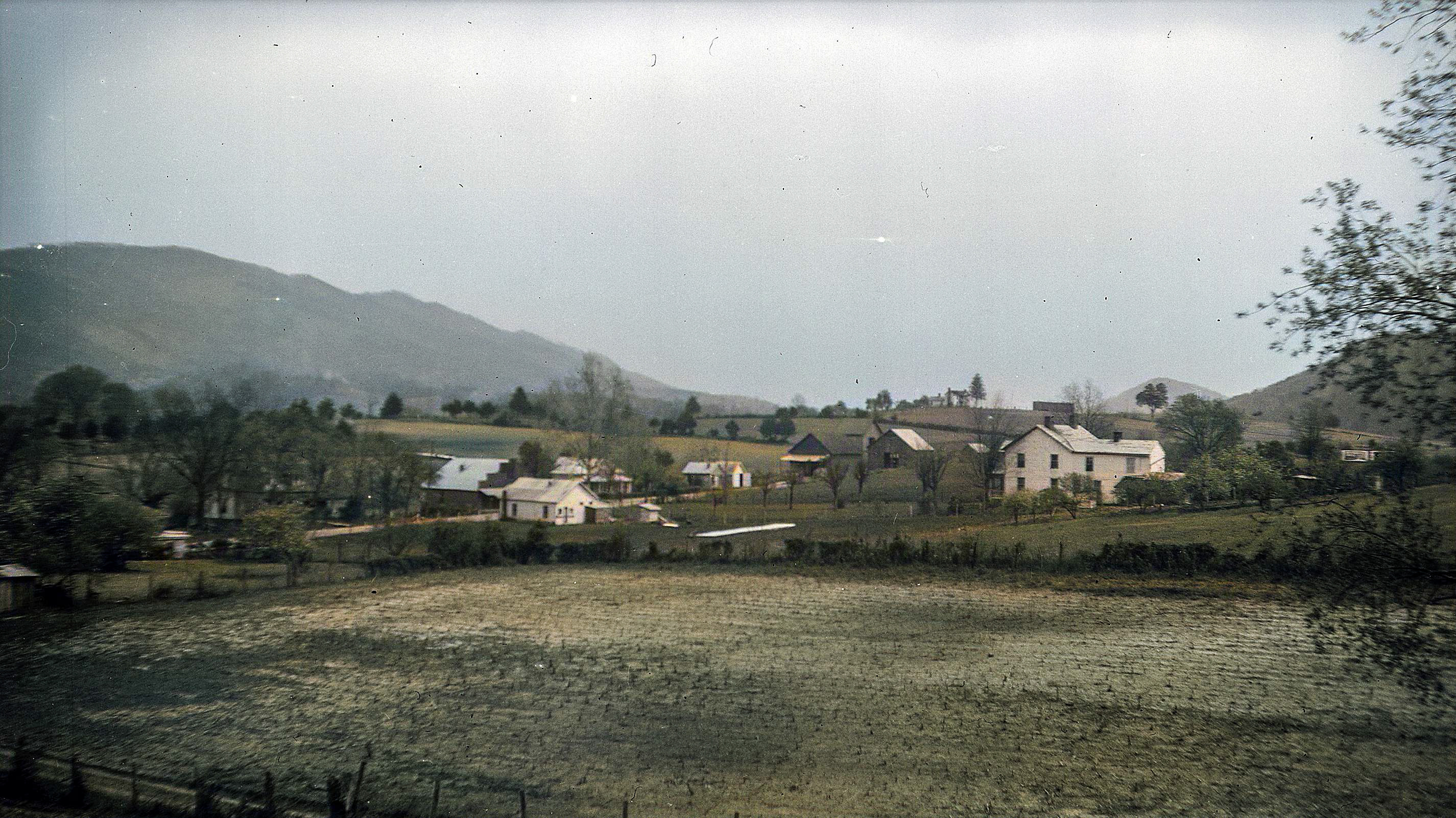
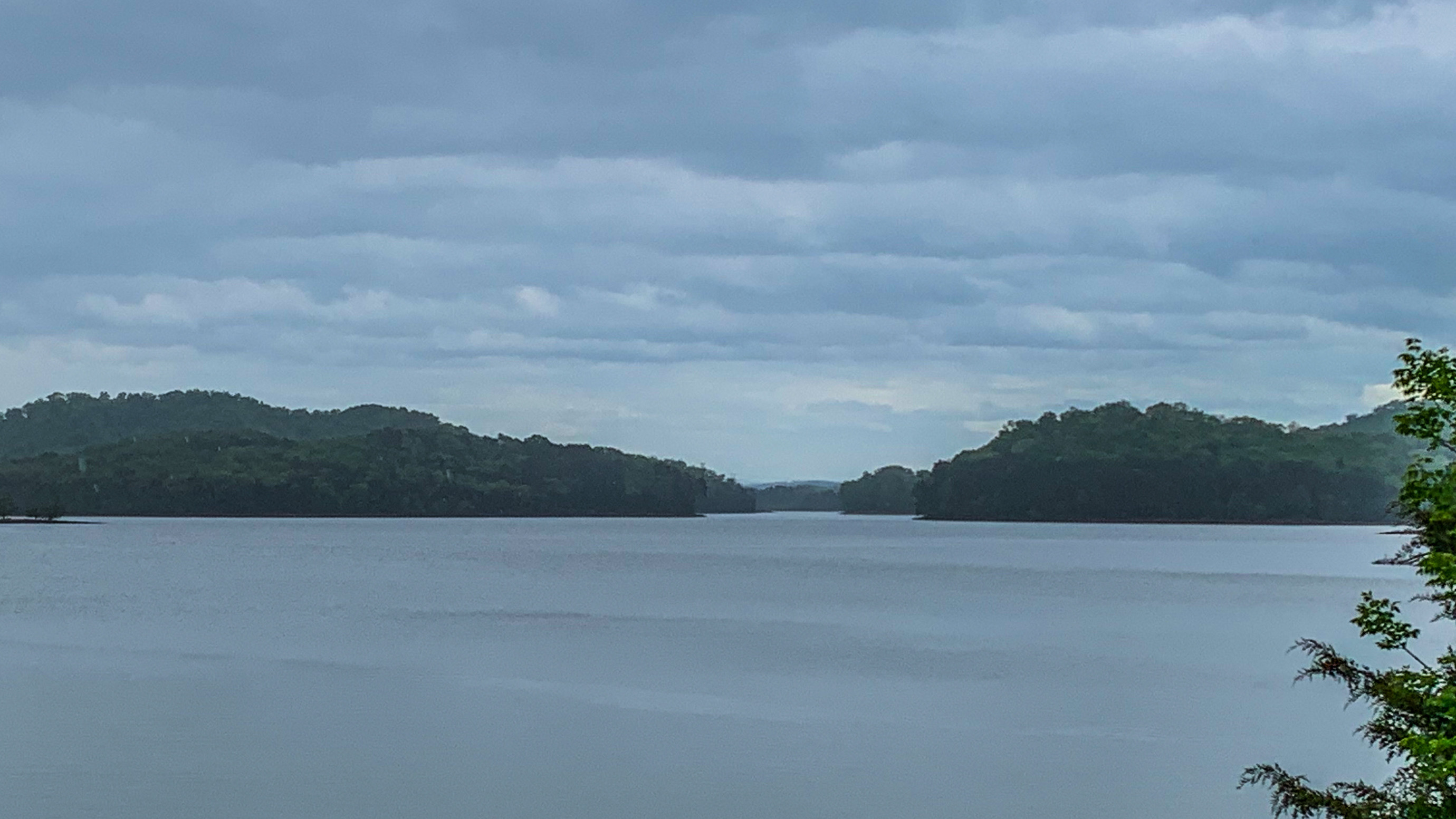
The original site of Bean Station was home to roughly 200 families, with an extra 200 in its surrounding area. Most of the 434 families forced out by TVA in Grainger County were from this region. More than 50 homes, businesses, and historical sites were lost following the impoundment of the town by TVA.

Initial plans for the construction of Cherokee Dam by the Tennessee Valley Authority (TVA) several miles downstream along the Holston River included the impounding of the site of Bean Station. In 1941, because of its historical significance, size, and potential relocation problems, officials from the TVA, the Government of Tennessee, historians, and concerned community members gathered in public forums to discuss the town's future and relocation efforts before the valley was flooded the following year.

In early 1941, a commission consisting of state planning and TVA personnel hosted town-hall meetings in Bean Station to develop plans for the town to relocate as a planned village, which was similar to the 1930s planning process for Norris for the TVA's earlier Norris Project. Controversy arose following failed negotiations with unwilling property owners for the relocation sites and reluctance from most residents to relocate; the community relocation project was abandoned and most citizens relocated on their own terms. Following the Cherokee Project's completion, the TVA's project report cited opposition from Bean Station residents as the project's biggest difficulty.

Of the estimated 200 families who lived at the original site of Bean Station, nearly 150 (87.5%) were mandated to move via eminent domain. Many houses, 20 businesses, and Clinchdale, the estate of Senator John K. Shields, were demolished or moved, and at least one historical structure had to be relocated. Bean Station Tavern was deconstructed but after the relocation project was canceled, the parts remained in long-term storage.

=== Mid-to-late 20th and early 21st centuries ===
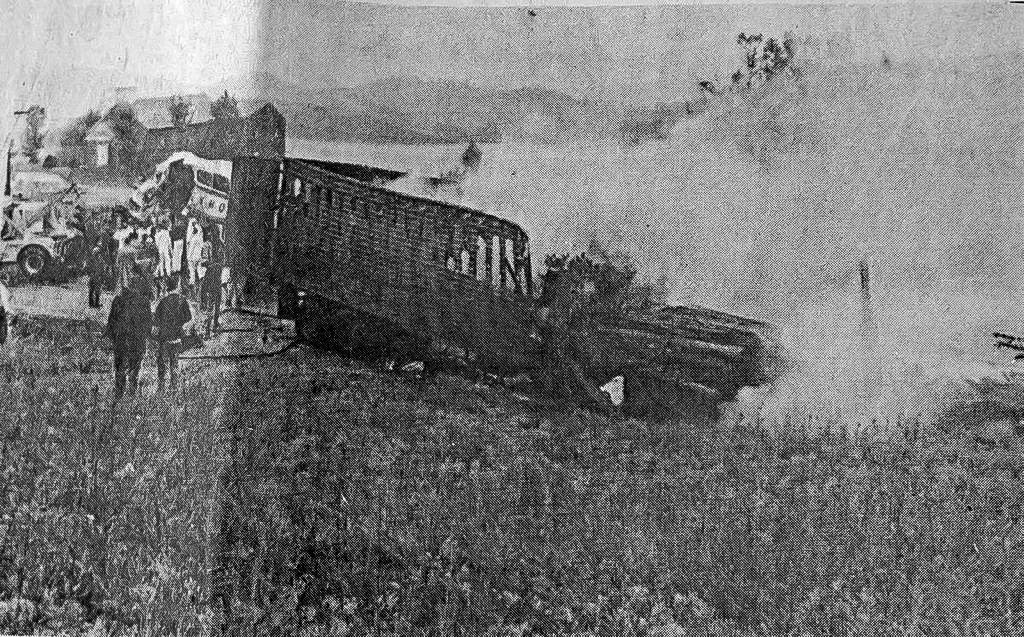
Aftermath of the 1972 Bean Station bus–truck collision on US 11W, the deadliest automobile accident in Tennessee history

Following the 1942 inundation of the original site of Bean Station and the failed relocation plans, Bean Station unofficially shifted to the relocated intersection of US 25E and US 11W near the Grainger-Hawkins County border. During the mid-20th century, Bean Station saw a renewed growth in population and economic progress. The community's access to the road network via US 11W and US 25E facilitated the nationwide trucking industry, and new truck stops and motels serving truckers were built. During early planning for the nationwide freeway network that became the Interstate Highway System, the corridor that became Interstate 81 (I-81) was planned to follow US 11W between Knoxville and Bristol through Bean Station. By the 1940s, plans for the route had its alignment shifted south of Morristown. Farmers in the town and surrounding area opposed the route through Bean Station, and roadway planners and engineers were also reportedly swooned by officials in Greene and Hamblen counties.

In 1961, following efforts led by a Morristown historical group, the TVA proposed a 50-acre (20 ha) historical park near the western interchange between US 11W and US 25E, and plans to rebuild the Bean Station Tavern on-site. These plans were scrapped when it was discovered the lengthy storage period had caused the original tavern materials to deteriorate beyond repair, and the TVA-owned land reserved for the park was used for a public baseball park on behalf of Grainger County officials. As the region's economy began to diversify, manufacturing overtook agriculture as the area's main source of income. By the mid 20th century, development along Highways 25E and 11W, and the construction of manufacturing facilities increased, and in 1964, the community attempted to incorporate into a city. Residents rejected incorporartion in a referendum by a margin of 153 votes to 94. In 1967, residents organized and chartered the Bean Station Volunteer Fire Department, and in 1975, the Bean Station Volunteer Rescue Squad was established.

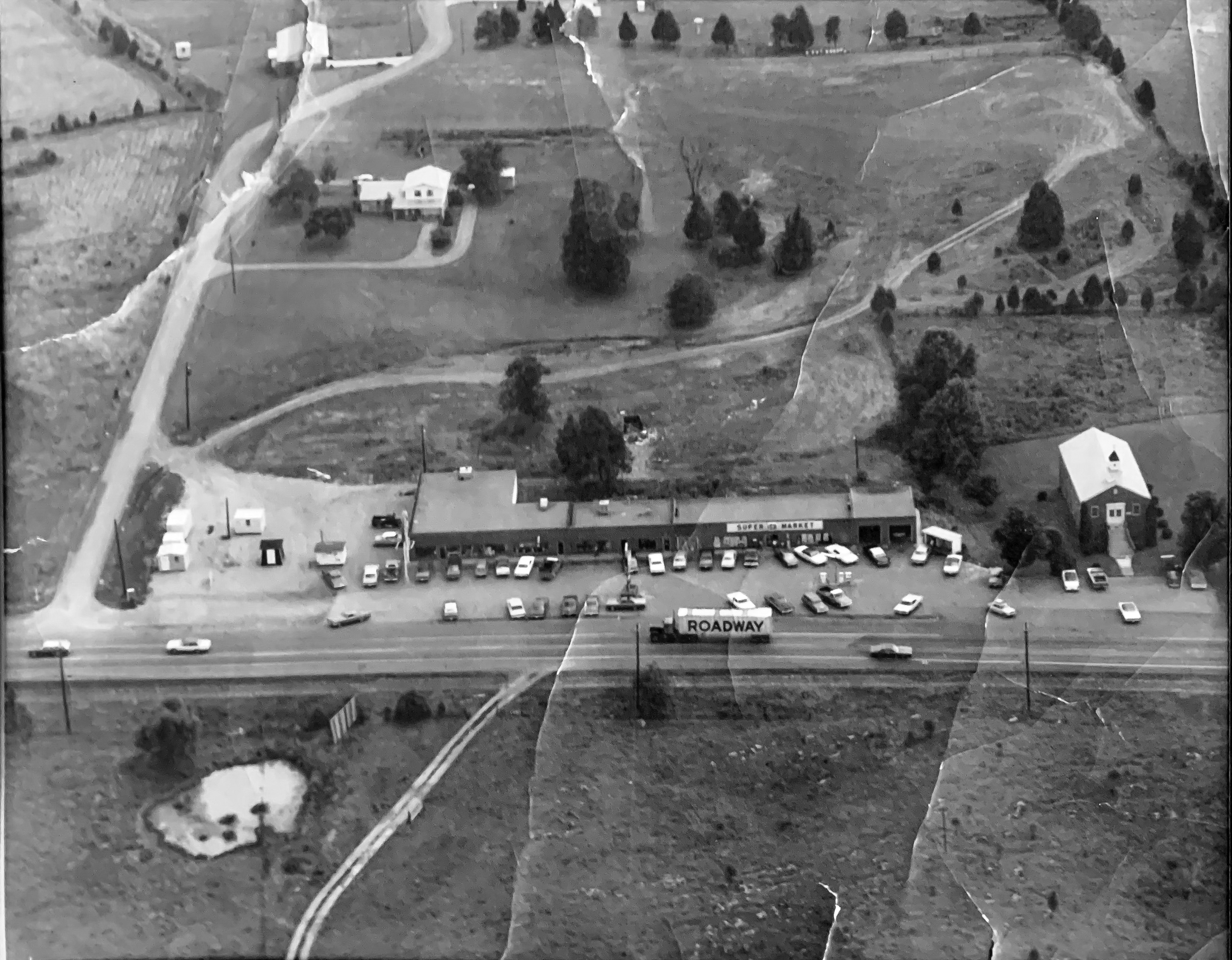
US 11W in downtown Bean Station in 1978; featuring an IGA supermarket, the town's largest business at the time.

In 1977, residents of Bean Station again petitioned to incorporate into a city, whose new boundaries would include portions of the neighboring community Mooresburg across the Hawkins County line. The proposal was rejected in a 291-to-160 vote. In the mid-1990s, rumors portions of southern Bean Station may be annexed into Morristown spread throughout the community, leading residents to petition a third incorporation election in 1994. In 1996, the town's residents voted to incorporate Bean Station into a city with a population of 2,171. The vote was carried with 627 in favor of incorporation and 142 against.

==== Notable incidents ====
On May 13, 1972, 14 people were killed and 15 were injured in a head-on collision between a double-decker Greyhound bus and a tractor-trailer on U.S. Route 11W in Bean Station. The collision led to protests and calls for traffic safety and infrastructure improvements, including the widening of 11W and other state highways, and the completion of I-81 in Tennessee to alleviate congestion on 11W. The accident remains the deadliest traffic collision in the history of Tennessee.

On May 23, 2013, an armed robbery and hostage-taking occurred at a pharmacy located in downtown Bean Station. The act was committed by an ex-police officer for the town who killed two people in an execution-style shooting and injured two others after robbing the pharmacy for opioids. The following day, a vigil for the four victims was held at Bean Station town hall with an estimated 300 people in attendance.

== Geography ==
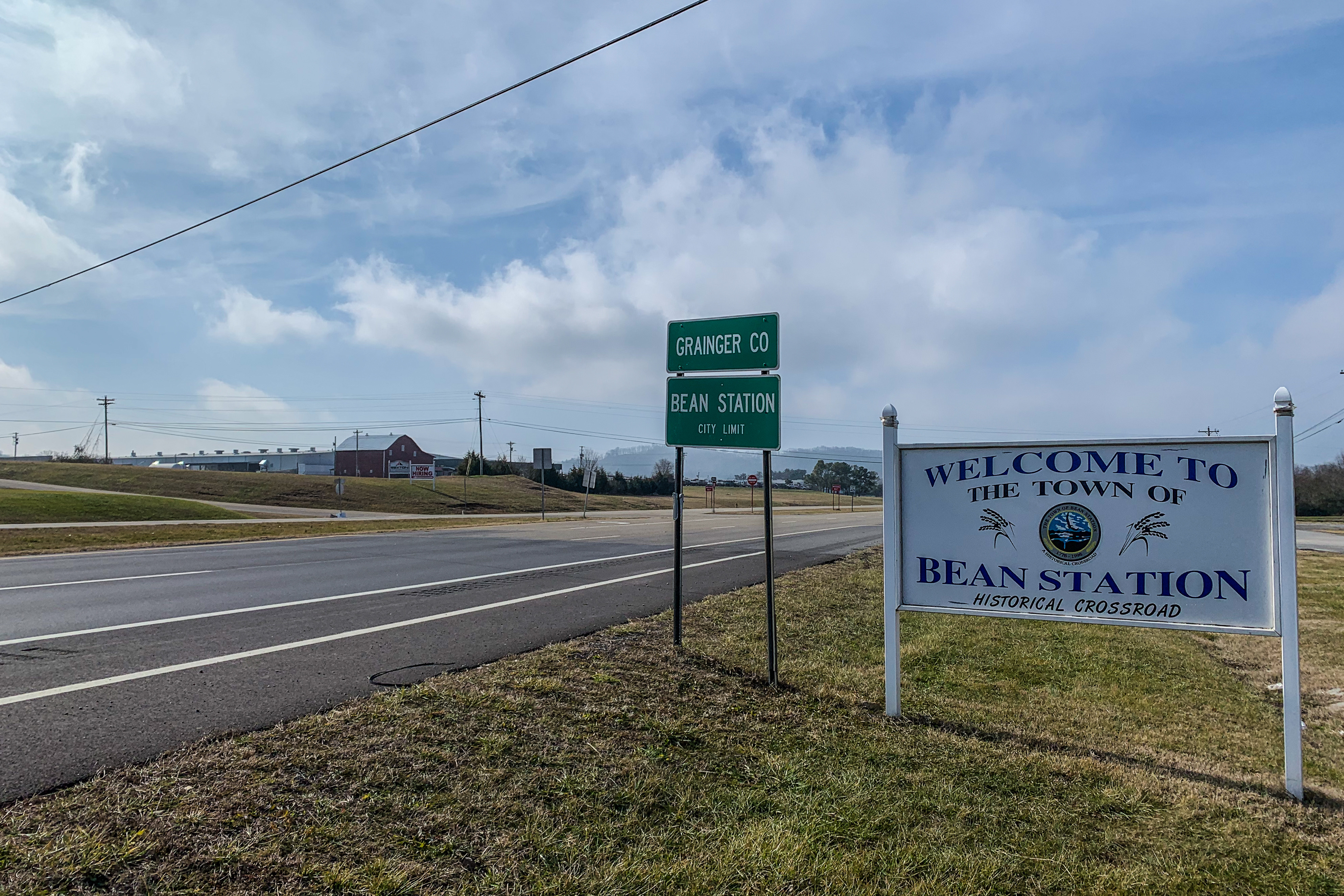
City limits signage of Bean Station

Bean Station is located in rural easternmost Grainger County, 45 miles (72 km) northeast of Knoxville, where it borders the unincorporated community of Mooresburg at the line between Grainger and Hawkins Counties. The town is situated in the Richland Valley, which is also known as Mooresburg Valley, with Clinch Mountain to the north and Cherokee Lake to the south.

According to the U.S. Census Bureau, Bean Station has an area of 5.4 square miles (14.0 km^{2}), of which 0.436 acres (1,763 m^{2}) (0.01%) is covered with water. The town limits include Wyatt Village, which is located next to an arm of Cherokee Lake along US 25E south of downtown, and portions of Tate Springs, which is located near US-11W and Briar Fork Creek on Cherokee Lake. The town limits stretch eight miles (13 km) along the heavily trafficked US 25E to Olen R. Marshall Memorial Bridge across Cherokee Lake, and four miles (6.4 km) along US 11W to Bean Station Elementary School. Since 2014, portions of unincorporated Hawkins County in the Mooresburg area have been annexed into the town limits.

=== Neighborhoods ===
- Bayside
- Campbell Heights
- Clinchview Landing
- Country Club Hills
- Crosby Park
- Gammon Springs
- Hillview Acres
- Lakeview Estates
- Leon Rock
- Livingston Heights
- Meadow Branch
- Meadow Creek Estates
- Shields Crossing
- Tanglewood
- Tate Springs
- Wyatt Village

== Demographics ==
Historical population
Census	Pop.	Note	%±
1990	2,356		—
2000	2,514		6.7%
2010	3,092		23.0%
2020	2,967		−4.0%

=== 2020 census ===
Bean Station racial composition
Race	Number	Percentage
White (non-Hispanic)	2,762	93.09%
Black or African American (non-Hispanic)	15	0.51%
Native American	3	0.1%
Asian	5	0.17%
Other/Mixed	109	3.67%
Hispanic or Latino	73	2.46%

As of the 2020 United States census, there was a population of 2,967, with 1,144 households and 774 families residing in the city.

=== 2010 census ===
As of the 2010 United States census, there were 3,092 people, 1,149 households, and 827 families residing in the town; 96.8% were White, 0.6% Black or African American, 0.5% Native American, 0.1% Asian, 0.7% of two or more races, and 2.3% were Hispanic or Latino (of any race). The average household size was 2.46 and the average family size was 2.88. 25% of households had children under the age of 18 living with them, 51.8% were married couples living together, 6.3% had a male householder with no wife present, and 13.9% were female householders with no husband present. 28% of households were non-families. The median age of residents in the town was 47.8. 21.7% of residents were under the age of 18, and 16.2% were age 65 years or older.

== Economy ==
Bean Station has a small selection of restaurants and stores. A large cluster of fireworks stores are located throughout the town due to Grainger County allowing the year-round sale of fireworks. A family-operated IGA Market is the only grocery store in the Bean Station area. Bean Station includes a furniture manufacturing facility, a Clayton Homes manufacturing facility, and a construction materials supplier. In 2010, 72% of the town's population commuted outside Grainger County for work, with most finding employment in Morristown. The average commute time for Bean Station residents is 24 minutes.

=== Road networks ===
Following the opening of the last section of I-81 in Tennessee in December 1974, Bean Station experienced a 60% decline in business as a result of decreased traffic on US 11W. Most truck stops, gift stores, and motels in Bean Station closed in the following years. US 25E experienced an opposite scenario to US 11W in Bean Station; the completion of I-81 led to increased congestion on this highway from its junction with I-75 in Kentucky through Bean Station into Morristown due to the route becoming a popular alternate corridor for truckers bypassing I-75 in Knoxville. Increased, sprawling residential development in Bean Station and residents commuting to neighboring Morristown led to overcapacity on two-lane 25E. In the 1980s, US-25E was widened to a four-lane limited-access highway from Lakeshore Drive to across Cherokee Lake into Morristown, and from the gap at Clinch Mountain to the base near the westernmost junction of 11W and 25E in Bean Station. In 1995, US 11W and US 25E were relocated and widened into a four-lane limited-access highway, bypassing Bean Station's central business district and prompting several businesses to relocate near the new bypass.

== Arts, culture, and recreation ==
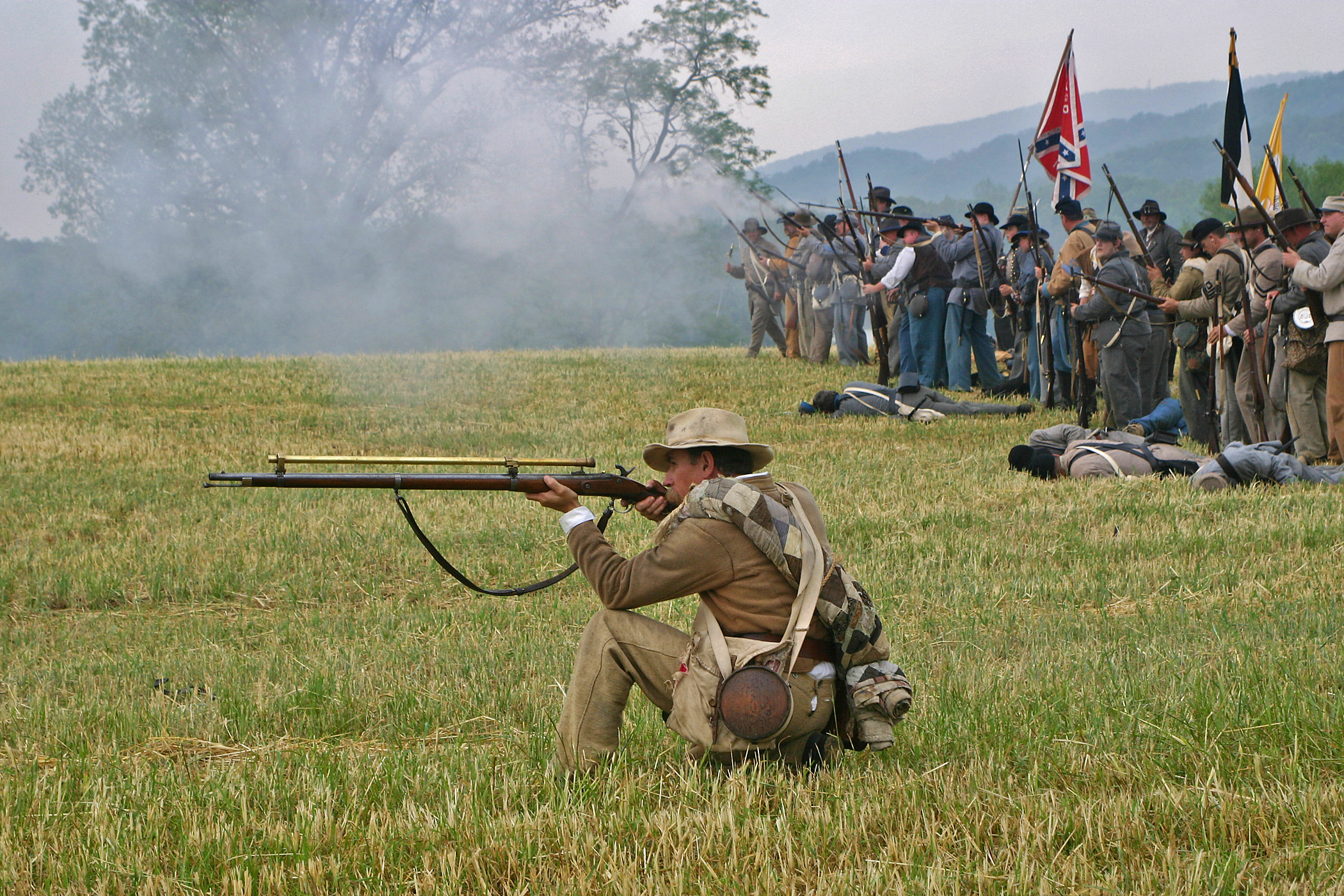
Actors take part in a 2005 re-enactment of the Battle of Bean's Station

Since 1996, Bean Station's downtown district has hosted an annual harvest festival celebrating the area's agriculture and craftsmanship. Thousands of guests attend. In 2007, a Guinness World Record for the largest pot of beans was established at the 11th Harvest Pride festival, with the pot holding 600 US gal (2,300 L) of baked beans.

Bean Station is popular with boaters and anglers due to its access to Cherokee Lake. A public golf course is located within the town limits. Parks and public recreation areas include Bean Station Town Park, Harris Court Park, and public access to Cherokee Lake via a fishing pier and boat launches.

=== Historic sites ===
- Battle of Bean's Station site
- Original Bean Station settlement site, Bean cabin site, and historical marker
- Tate Springs resort site and Tate Springs Springhouse

== Government ==
Bean Station uses the mayor-aldermen system, which was adopted in 1996 when the town was incorporated. The town is governed locally by a five-member Board of Mayor and Aldermen, who are elected by residents to four-year terms. The board elects a vice mayor from among the four aldermen.

Bean Station is represented in the 10th district of the Tennessee House of Representatives by Rick Eldridge, a Republican. It is represented in the 8th district of the Tennessee Senate by Frank Niceley, who is also a Republican. The town is part of the state's 2nd congressional district in the United States House of Representatives, which is represented by Republican Tim Burchett.

== Education ==
Bean Station Elementary School, which is located in the westernmost part of the town, is operated by the Grainger County Department of Education. Middle-school students attend Rutledge Middle School, and high-school students attend Grainger High School in Rutledge. All of these schools are part of the Grainger County Schools District.

Kingswood Home for Children is located in the Tate Springs area of Bean Station.

== Media ==
=== Newspaper ===
- Grainger Today, a weekly news publication based in Bean Station reporting on Grainger County related news; in operation since 2004.

=== FM radio ===
- WJDT
- WBGQ

== Infrastructure ==
=== Utilities ===
Bean Station Utility District, a municipal utilities company, connects the town and portions of eastern Grainger County with municipal water services. Appalachian Electric Cooperative provides electricity and broadband internet services. As of 2021, Bean Station does not have access to public sewers.

=== Transportation ===
All U.S. routes and state routes in Bean Station are maintained by the Tennessee Department of Transportation (TDOT) in TDOT Region 1, which consists of 24 counties in the East Tennessee region. Streets in the town are maintained by the Bean Station Street Department.

In the western of portion of the town, adjacent to Kingswood Home for Children on the Tate Springs resort site, two major highways merge; U.S. Route 25E enters from the northwest and U.S. Route 11W enters from the southwest. From this point, US 25E traverses Clinch Mountain to Tazewell in Claiborne County, while US 11W runs west through the Richland Valley to Rutledge. The highways split again just south of Bean Station's central business district (CBD); US 11W bypasses the CBD and continues northeastward to Rogersville, and US 25E continues southward across Cherokee Lake into Hamblen County to Morristown. Tennessee State Route 375 (SR 75, Lakeshore Drive) also intersects US 25E south of the CBD and traverses several of Bean Station's affluent outskirt lakefront neighborhoods and subdivisions.

==== Principal highways ====
- US 11W / SR 1 (Lee Highway)
- US 25E / SR 32 (East Tennessee Crossing Byway, Appalachian Development Corridor S)
- SR 375 (Lakeshore Drive)

== Notable residents ==
- Peter Ellis Bean – filibuster
- William Bean – longhunter, namesake, and town founder
- Leanne Morgan - comedian
- Robert E. Preston – Director of United States Mint

== In popular culture ==
Bean Station was referenced on the NBC police procedural comedy series Brooklyn Nine-Nine; one of the show's secondary characters Bill Hummertrout cites it as his hometown.
