= William Bean =

Tennessee's first permanent European-American settler (1721-1782)

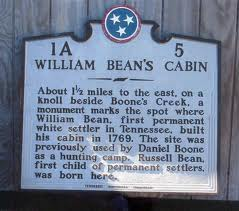
- Tennessee Historical Commission marker placed near the William Bean Cabin site in present-day Johnson City
- Born: William Bean; December 9, 1721; St. Stephens Parish, Virginia
- Died: May 1782 (aged 60); Bean's Station, Tennessee
- Occupations: Longhunter, soldier, pioneer, politician
- Known for: being the reported first permanent European-American settler, and founding the first permanent European-American settlement of Tennessee
- Title: Commissioner, Watauga Association
- Term: 1772-April 1775
- Predecessor: Office established
- Successor: Office dissolved
- Spouse: Lydia Russell (m. 1744; died 1788)
- Children: 6
- Parents: William Bean (father); Margaret Hatton Bean (mother)

William Bean (December 9, 1721 – May 1782) was a frontiersman, longhunter, and Commissioner of the Watauga Association. He is accepted by historians as the first permanent European American settler of Tennessee.

== Biography ==
William Bean was born December 9, 1721. In 1744, Bean married Lydia Russell of Northumberland County. William was of Scottish descent, and Lydia was of English descent.

== Settlement in the Watauga Association ==
In 1762, Bean set camp close to the junction of Boone's Creek and the Watauga River, near present day Johnson City during a longhunting excursion with fellow pioneers and friends Daniel Boone and Richard Callaway, on behalf of Richard Henderson, a land surveyor who played an important role in the early settlement of Tennessee. In 1769, he constructed a cabin at this site and relocate his family. Shortly after the cabin's completion, Lydia Bean gave birth to a son, Russell Bean, who would be historically accepted as the first European American born in present-day Tennessee. The Bean family encountered aggressive confrontations with the inhabiting Cherokee tribes, and found distaste in the growing popularity of the Watauga Association. Nevertheless, William Bean pursued a career in politics and be elected as a commissioner of the Watauga Association in 1772, serving a crucial role in the absorption of the settlement into the state of North Carolina by 1775.

== American Revolution and establishment of Bean Station ==
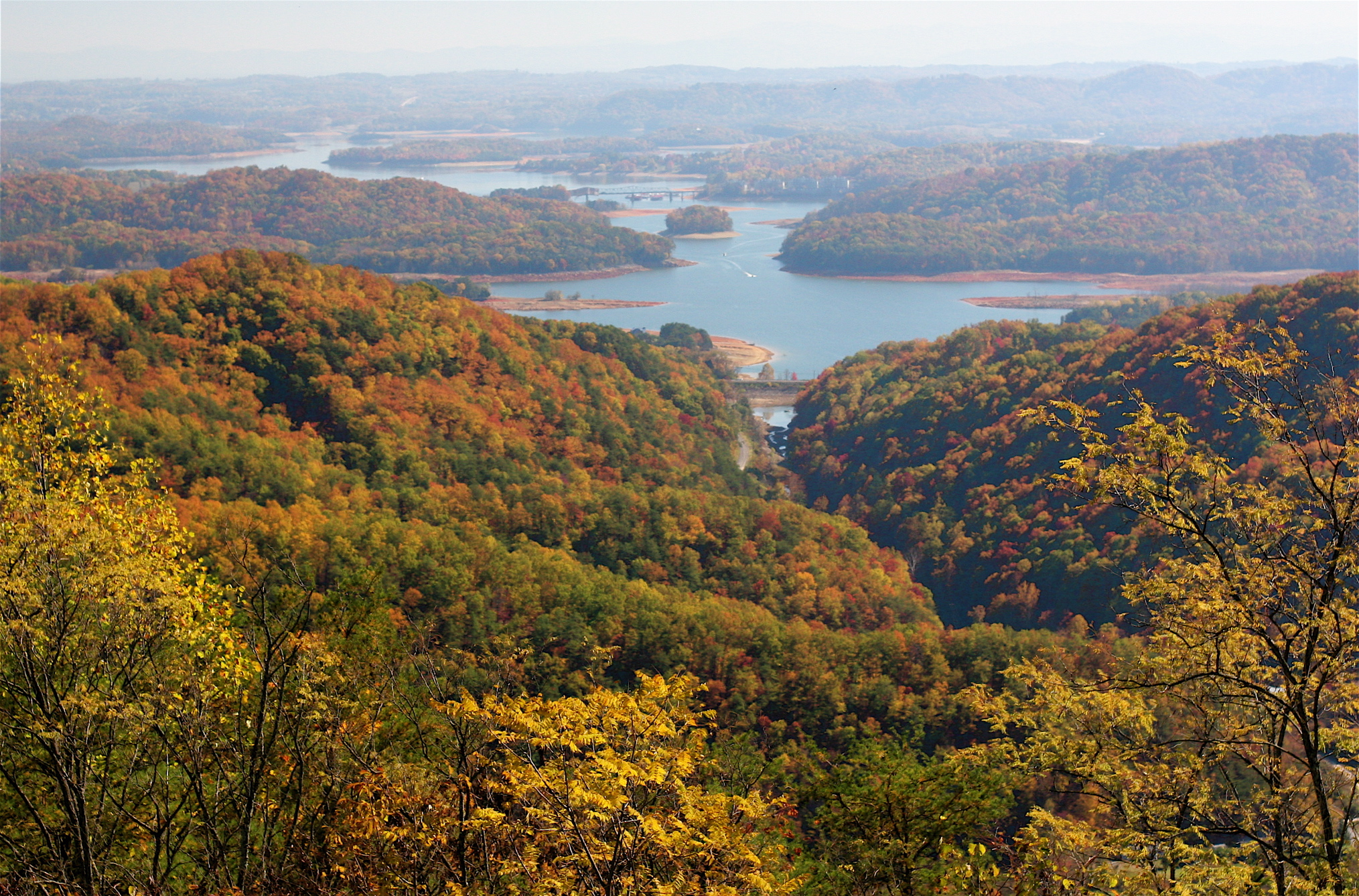
The view of the German Creek valley as seen from Clinch Mountain

In 1775, William Bean collaborated with Daniel Boone on a new longhunting excursion, as Bean wanted to move west with the Watauga Association gaining popularity, and Boone was wanting to expand his Wilderness Road southward towards the Great Indian Warpath. The duo crossed the gap on top of Clinch Mountain after traversing the Powell and Clinch rivers in present-day Claiborne and Grainger counties in Tennessee. After surveying the valley below, Bean and Boone descended the southward slope of Clinch Mountain and set camp along the German Creek tributary of the Holston River and the Great Indian Warpath. Finding appreciation for the vast wildlife, timber, fertile soil, and access to navigable waters, Bean chose this site as the permanent site of his new home and to establish a community with Boone planning to extend the Wilderness Road to the campsite location.

During the Revolutionary War, Bean served as a captain for the Virginia militia, and was awarded over 3,000 acres in the German Creek valley where he surveyed and camped at previously with Boone in 1776. In the same year, Bean constructed a four-room cabin with the assistance of his sons. The cabin served as his family's home, and as an inn for prospective settlers, fur traders, and longhunters, named Bean Station, establishing the first reportedly permanent settled community in present-day Tennessee.

In 1780, Bean served in his position of captain in the Battle of Kings Mountain.

== Death and legacy ==
In May 1782, Bean died of unknown causes at the age of 60 in his cabin at Bean Station.

Bean's settlement of Bean Station grew substantially following his death in 1782. By 1787, Bean's sons constructed a fort, blacksmiths shop, and a trading outpost at the community's crossroads of the Wilderness Road and the Great Indian Warpath.

Bean Station emerged as an important stopover, due to its strategic location on the crossroads of present-day U.S. Route 25E and U.S. Route 11W, between Washington, D.C., and New Orleans for early travelers through Tennessee into the 18th century.

The town and cabin established by Bean were lost following the flooding of the Holston River valley for the construction of the Cherokee Dam by the Tennessee Valley Authority in 1942. Bean Station unofficially relocated to the new crossroads of US 25E and US 11W, and incorporated into a town in 1996.
