= Tate Springs, Tennessee =

- Unincorporated community
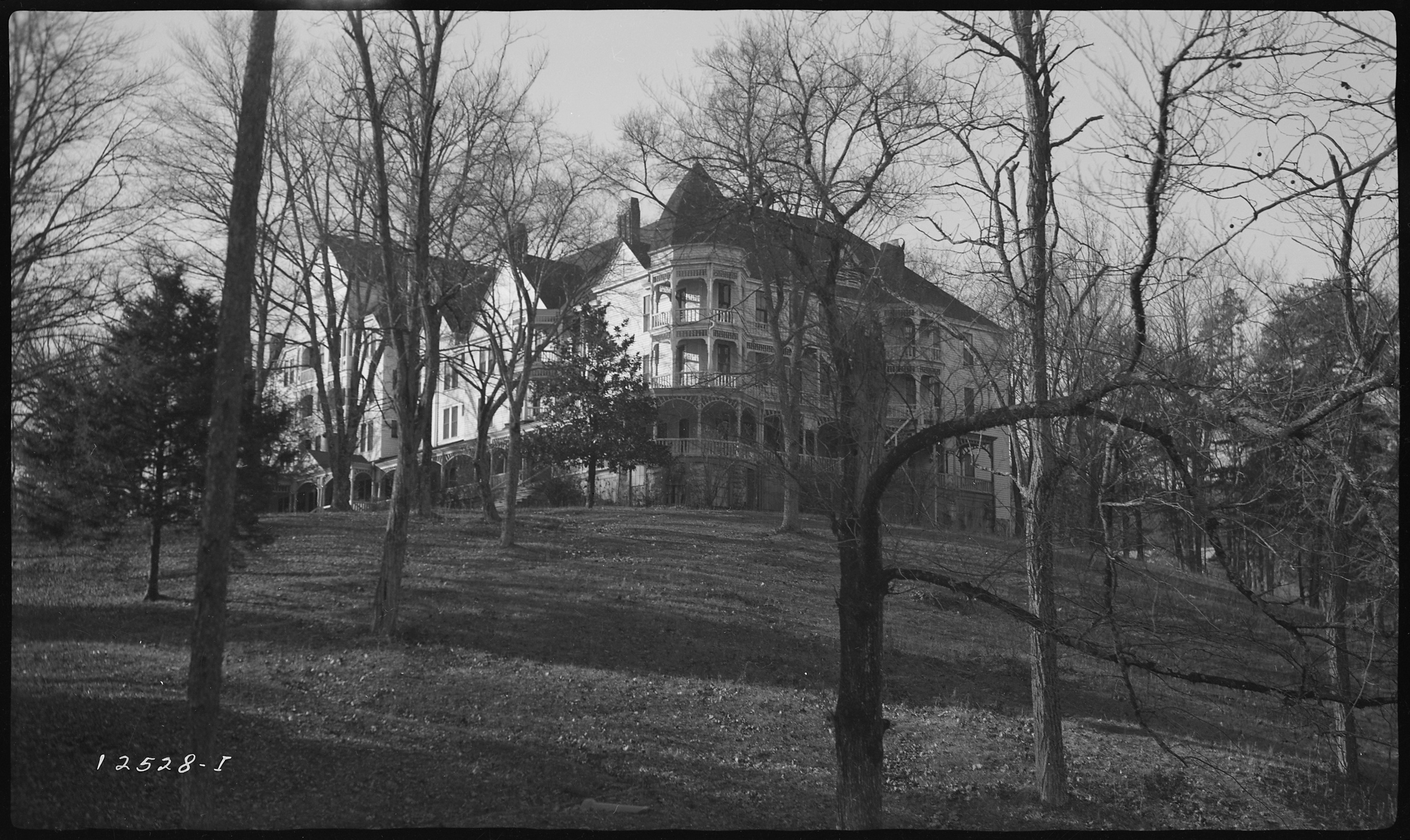
- The former Tate Springs Resort Hotel circa 1940

- Location within Tennessee Location within the United States
- Coordinates: 36.340462°N 83.340508°W
- Country: United States
- State: Tennessee
- County: Grainger
- Town: Bean Station
- Named for: Resort of same name
- Elevation: 1,119 ft (341 m)
- Time zone: UTC-5 (Eastern (EST))
  - Summer (DST): UTC-4 (EDT)
- ZIP code: 37708
- Area code: 865
- FIPS code: 47-47057
- GNIS feature ID: 1304010

Tate Springs is an unincorporated community in Grainger County, Tennessee and neighborhood of Bean Station. It is part of the Morristown Metropolitan Statistical Area which consists of Grainger, Hamblen, and Jefferson counties.

== History ==
In the post-Civil War era, a businessman named Samuel Tate constructed a large Victorian-style luxury hotel in the community that became the main focus of a resort known as Tate Springs. Around the late 1870s, the hotel was purchased by Captain Thomas Tomlinson, who would transform the property into a vast resort that advertised the supposed healing powers of its mineral spring’s water. During its heyday, the resort complex included over three-dozen buildings, a 100-acre (40 ha) park, and an 18-hole golf course. The resort had attracted some of the wealthiest people in America during this time. The resort declined during the Great Depression, and the hotel and most of its outbuildings have since been demolished after a major fire damaged the main hotel structure. The Tate Springs Springhouse still stands just off U.S. Route 11W near Bean Station Elementary School.

Since the 1960s, the resort site and its remaining cabins have been used by Kingswood Home for Children, a children's home and school.

== Geography ==
Tate Springs is located about 4 miles west of Bean Station, and parts of the community have since been annexed into the town.
