= Cherokee Lake =

Artificial reservoir in Tennessee, United States

- Cherokee Reservoir
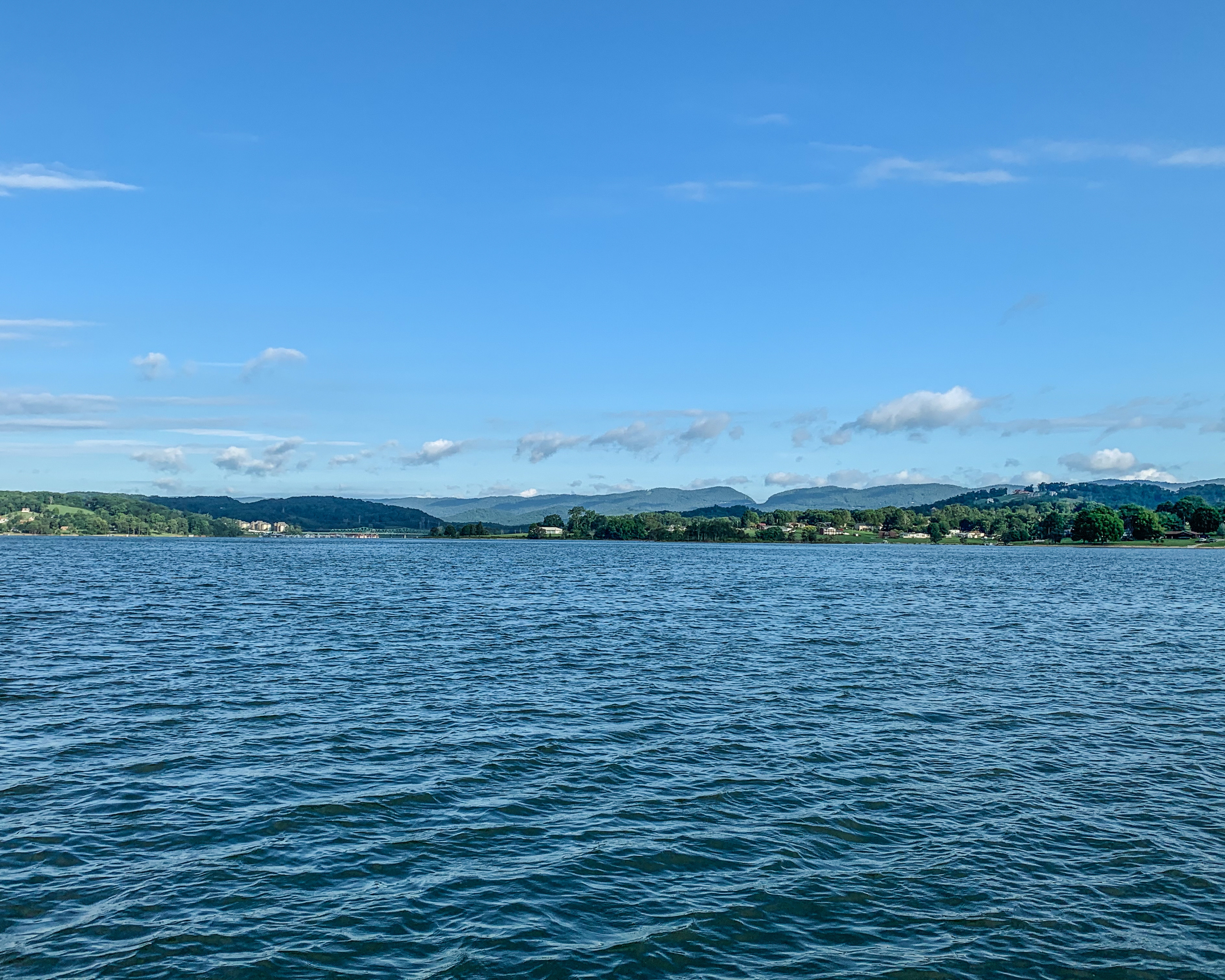
- Cherokee Lake near Bean Station, with the Clinch Mountain range in the background

- Location within Tennessee Location within the United States
- Location: Grainger / Hamblen / Jefferson / Hawkins counties, Tennessee, United States
- Coordinates: 36.2149°N 83.4350°W
- Type: Reservoir
- Primary inflows: Holston River
- Primary outflows: Holston River
- Basin countries: United States
- Managing agency: Tennessee Valley Authority
- Surface area: 28,780 acres (11,650 ha)
- Average depth: 30 ft (9.1 m)
- Water volume: 749,400 acre⋅ft (924,400,000 m^{3})
- Shore length^{1}: 400 mi (640 km)
- Surface elevation: 1,047 ft (319 m)
- Settlements: Bean Station, Morristown, Jefferson City, Rogersville
- Website: www.tva.com/energy/our-power-system/hydroelectric/Cherokee
- ^{1} Shore length is not a well-defined measure.

Cherokee Lake, also known as Cherokee Reservoir, is an artificial reservoir in the U.S. state of Tennessee formed by the impoundment of the Holston River behind Cherokee Dam.

== Hydrology ==
The reservoir has a surface area of about 28,780 acres (11,650 ha), a flood-storage capacity of 749,406 acre-feet (924,379,000 m^{3}), and nearly 400 miles (640 km) of shoreline. In a normal year, the lake water level fluctuates over a range of about 27 feet (8.2 m).

In order to maintain dissolved oxygen concentrations in the river below the dam at levels that will support aquatic life, perforated hoses suspended above the bottom of Cherokee Reservoir are used to inject oxygen into the reservoir water and devices which resemble large underwater fans located just above the dam are used to push warm oxygenated water downward to the depths where water is released for hydroelectric generation.

== Geology ==
Silt loam, slate, and red clay are commonly found in the basin and surrounding shoreline of Cherokee Lake.

== Natural history ==
Black bass, sauger, walleye, crappie, various sunfish, and the usual rough-fish species, are often found in the reservoir.

== History ==
From 1940 to 1942, the Tennessee Valley Authority (TVA) began purchasing property and performing acquisitions by eminent domain in the communities of Jefferson City in Jefferson County, and Bean Station in Grainger County, for the construction of Cherokee Dam and the impounding of the Holston River for Cherokee Lake. Many residents, at first in refusal, would reluctantly give up their farms and homes for the promise of flood control and electricity offered by the TVA. For Bean Station, the Cherokee Project included wiping out the site where the town was originally settled. Of the 195 to 200 families who lived at the original site of Bean Station, 140 were mandated to move by the TVA. Because of the historical significance, size and potential relocation problems presented with Bean Station, officials from the TVA, the Tennessee state government, and concerned community members gathered to discuss the future of the town and its relocation efforts in 1941. A planning commission from the state government and TVA personnel developed plans for sites for Bean Station to relocate to as a community. After controversy arose from negotiations from unwilling property owners, and reluctance from citizens to relocate as a town, the planned community relocation project was abandoned, having Bean Stationers relocating on their own will.

The reservoir was would be filled after the construction of Cherokee Dam near Grainger-Jefferson border in 1942. The dam, operated by the TVA, is used for hydroelectric generation and flood control. The dam was built on a crash schedule; construction started August 1, 1940, and was completed on December 5, 1941.

The dam and the reservoir were named after the Native American tribe of the same name by the TVA, as before the Holston's impoundment, the area was once inhabited by the tribe. The Great Indian Warpath, once used by pioneer Daniel Boone, lies in the basin of the reservoir.

== Economy ==
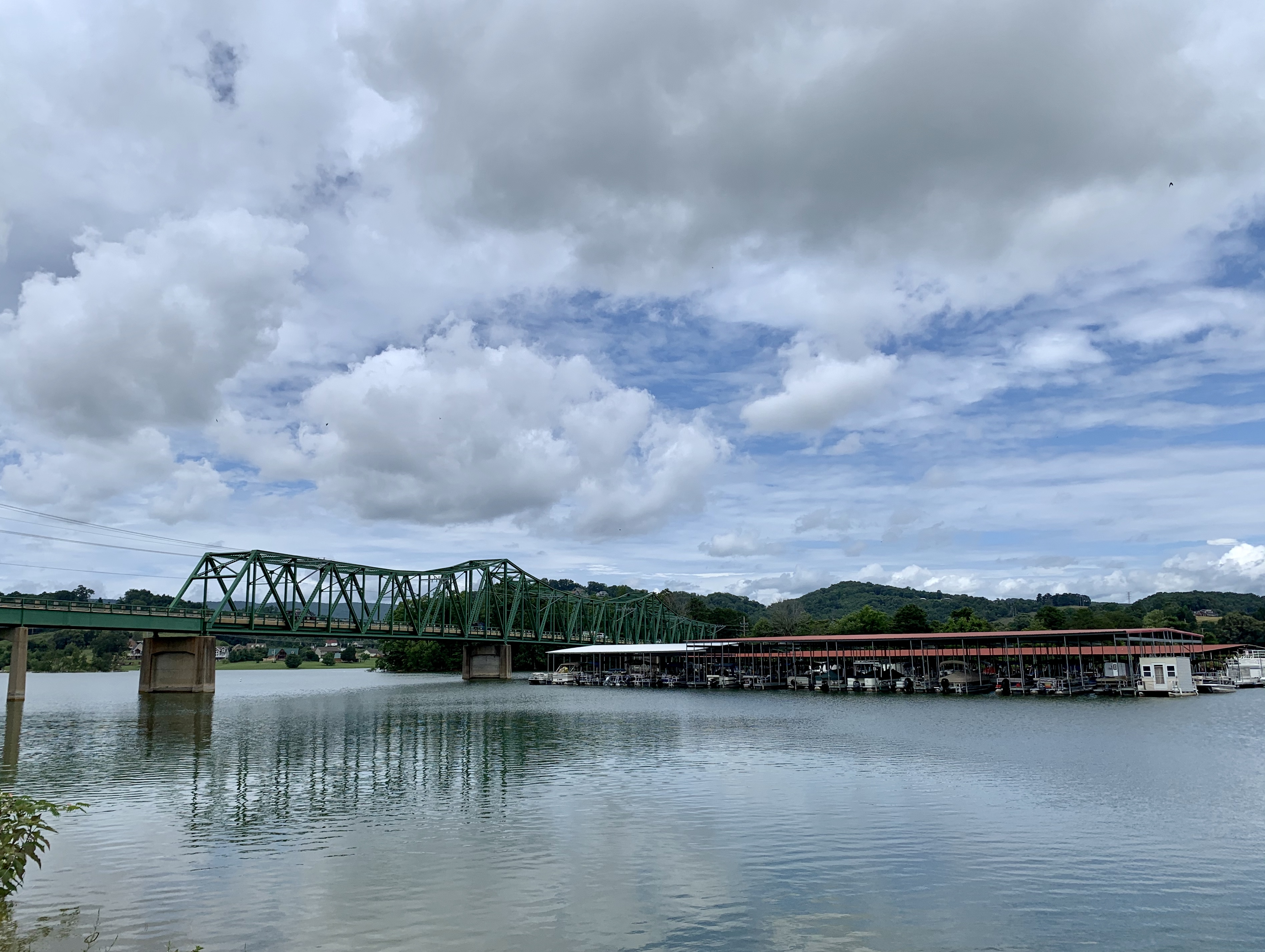
Marina located adjacent to German Creek Bridge on the lake near Bean Station.

Cherokee Lake in recent times has seen a large transition into a popular recreational tourist destination. Public boating access areas, Panther Creek State Park and other public parks, commercial boat docks, lakefront resorts, RV and tent campgrounds, and a state wildlife management area on the shores of the lake attract extensive recreational use, such as swimming, boating, paddling activities (such as canoeing, kayaking and paddleboarding), camping, water sports, and fishing. The lake is also home to a sailing club and regattas are hosted seasonally on its waters.

Since the lake has a greater fish density than most reservoirs maintained by the TVA, it has become one of the most popular for anglers in the East Tennessee region. In 2019, Cherokee Lake was ranked #20 by Bassmaster of the top 25 bass fishing lakes in the Southeastern United States. In October 2020, the reservoir was the location of the 2020 Bassmaster Eastern Open tournament.
