= Tate Springs =

Former resort complex in Bean Station, Tennessee

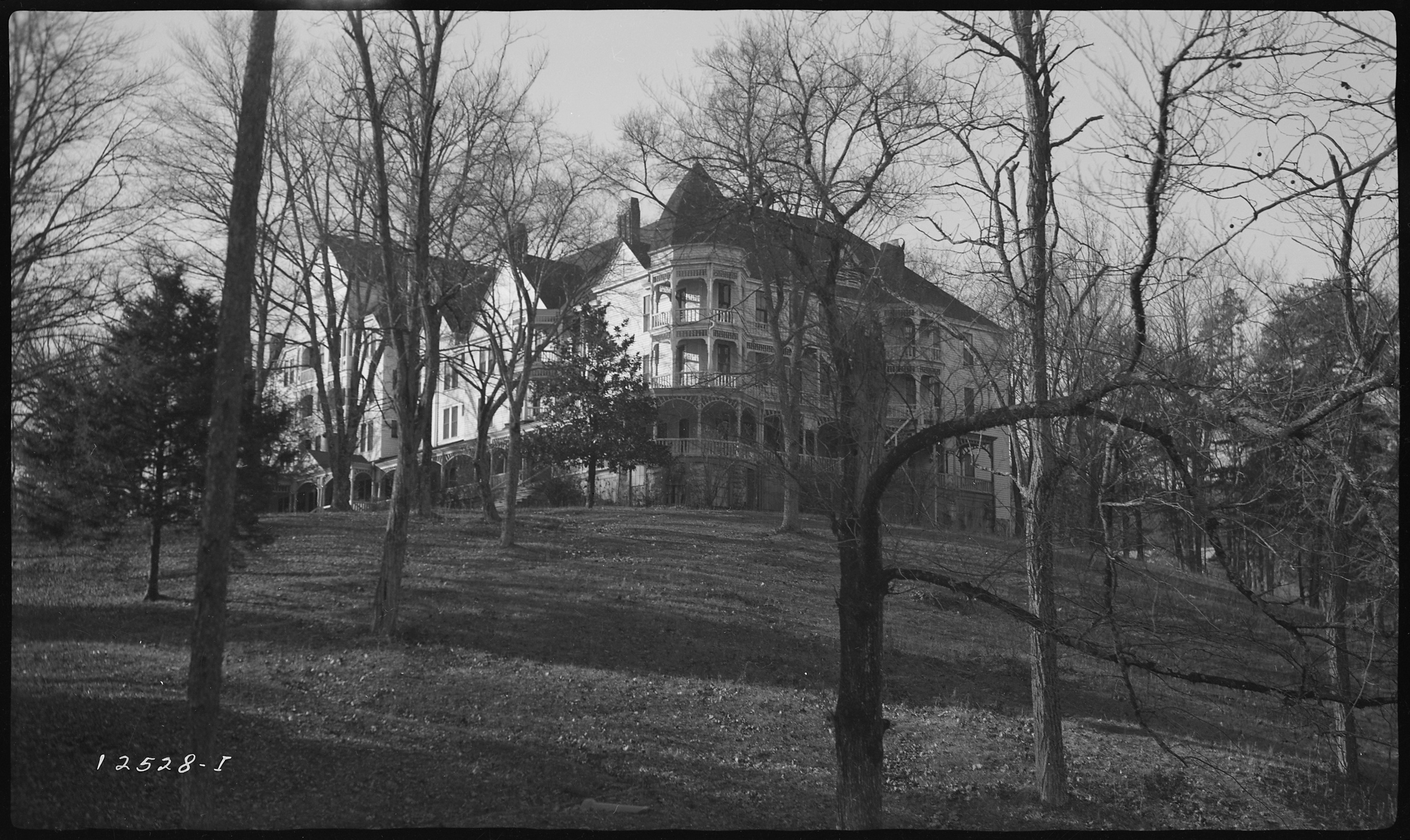
- The main hotel structure in 1940
- Interactive map of the Tate Springs area

General information
- Status: Destroyed by fire, lost to impoundment and highway construction
- Type: Luxury hotel
- Architectural style: Victorian
- Location: 7107-7065 U.S. Route 11W, Bean Station, Tennessee, United States
- Coordinates: 36.339290°N 83.346417°W
- Current tenants: Kingswood School
- Named for: Samuel Tate
- Completed: 1865
- Renovated: 1876, 1898, 1900, 1905, 1924, 1925
- Closed: 1941
- Destroyed: 1963

Technical details
- Floor count: 4
- Lifts/elevators: 1
- Grounds: 2,500 acres (1,000 ha)

Design and construction
- Developer: Thomas Tomlinson

Other information
- Seating capacity: 500 (original), 600 (replaced)
- Facilities: Pool; golf course; hiking trails; horse stables; tennis courts; ballroom
- Public transit: Peavine Railroad (1896-1928)

Tate Springs was a historic world-class luxury resort complex located on U.S. Route 11W in Bean Station, Tennessee, United States. Known for its mineral spring water shipped internationally, it was considered to be one of the most popular resorts of its time in the Southern United States, and was visited by many wealthy and prominent families such as the Ford, Rockefeller, Firestone, Studebaker, and Mellon families.

The hotel was destroyed by fire in 1963, and the only remnants of the complex are the cabins of the site, the pool bathhouse, and the springhouse, the last of which was listed on the National Register of Historic Places in 1973.

== Location ==
The resort was located in eastern Grainger County, Tennessee, in the town of Bean Station. It was situated along a roadway that served as the Great Indian Warpath, and is now known as U.S. Route 11W.

== History ==
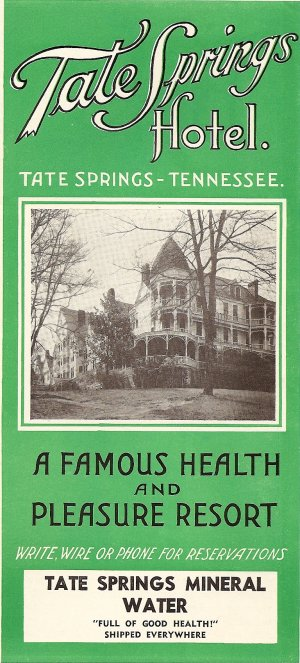
A brochure for the resort dated early 1920s.

The mineral spring used by the resort was believed to be discovered by members of the Cherokee tribe while planning the design of the Great Indian Warpath. The site of the springs was recognized as neutral ground during battles with neighboring tribes. The spring water was treated with high regard due to its healing ability on stomach, kidney, and liver diseases.

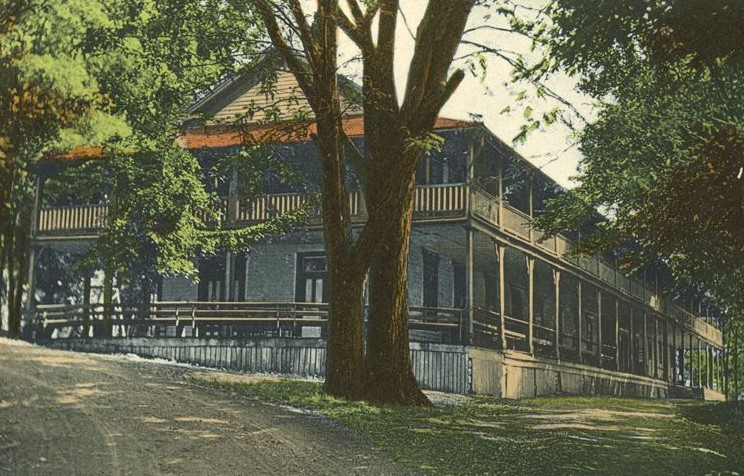
The original hotel constructed by Samuel Tate, circa 1924

Following the American Revolutionary War, over 6,000 acres, including the resort property and the spring, were bought by Colonel William Hord in 1791 from a North Carolina land grant. In 1865, nearly half of the land owned by Hord was purchased by Samuel Tate who built the first hotel at the spring site in the same year. This hotel had an estimated occupancy of 500 guests.

In 1876, Union Army veteran Thomas Tomlinson, who served in the Battle of Bean's Station, took up an interest in the Tate Springs area and bought the spring and hotel property from the Tate Family. Tomlinson would first build the springhouse at the spring, which consisted of an elegant Victorian-style two-story gazebo. Sections of Tomlinson's new hotel on the site would be constructed in several phases over time, with the middle section in 1898, the west wing in 1900, and the east wing in 1905. With the completion of the final section in 1905, Tomlinson's hotel had an estimated capacity of 600 guests.

Tomlinson's hotel after completion consisted of three stories with verandas on two of the hotel's stories, and a forth level cupola reserved for Tomlinson's private use.

With the completion of the Peavine Railroad, which connected Morristown to Knoxville in 1896, many of America's most prominent and wealthy families arrived to Tate Springs via private rail, leading to the most successful years of the resort. However, the depot at Tate Springs would close in 1919, prompting those who would stay at the resort to stop at the Bean Station depot, nearly three miles west of the resort.

In 1909, Thomas Tomlinson died, and left the resort property in ownership of his two sons and two daughters. One of his sons, Clem Tomlinson, would take over operations of the resort from his late father.

In 1924, the resort would see the addition of its swimming pool and bathhouse, located south of the hotel near German Creek. One year later, an 18-hole golf course designed by Donald Ross would open, and would be played by many elite golfers, including Bobby Jones. In 1925, a row of private cottages would be constructed, and would be the site of all-night drinking parties, given the row of cottages the moniker, Rowdy Row.

With the increasing usage of the automobile and the economic downturn created by the Great Depression, the resort and the Peavine Railroad would see a decline in revenue and usage. The Peavine Railroad, which provided speedy access to the resort, would cease operations in 1928. The original hotel constructed by Samuel Tate would be demolished in 1936, and the resort developed and operated by the Tomlinson family would close in 1941.

In 1941, prior to its closure, the hotel suffered the loss of some of its grounds, its sewage plant, and its 18-hole golf course due to the impoundment of the Holston River by the Tennessee Valley Authority for the construction of Cherokee Dam.

The relocation of U.S. Route 11W following the flooding of the Holston River valley would also impact the resort property, separating the main hotel from the remaining part of the golf course and several structures.

In 1943, the resort property was sold to Kingswood School, which used the hotel structure as a school and orphanage. In February 1963, the resort hotel would be destroyed following a massive fire.

== Features ==
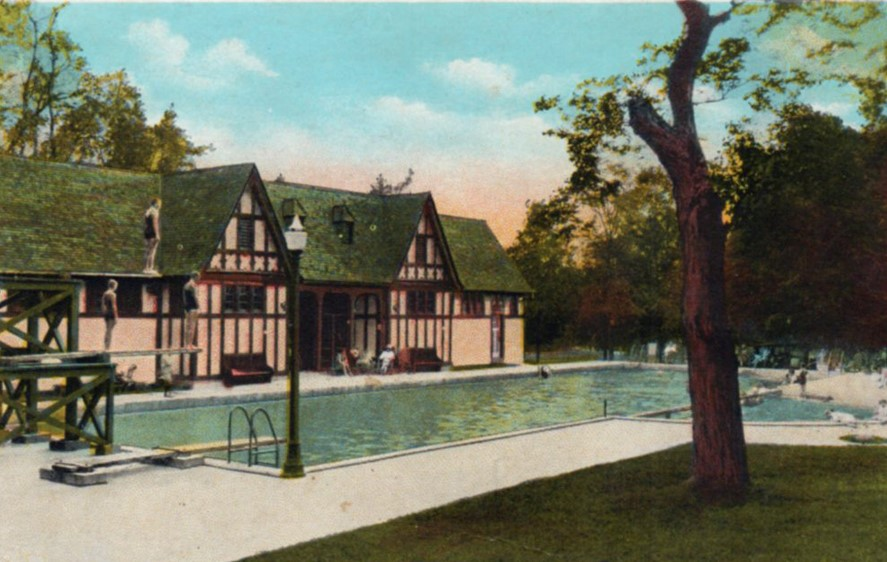
The resort's pool and bathouse, circa 1924

During its heyday, the Tate Springs resort complex consisted of the large, luxurious, three-story resort hotel, an estimated 30 to 40 outbuildings, an elegant ballroom, horse riding stables, swimming pool and bathhouse, billiards room, tennis courts, a 100-acre natural park, a professional 18-hole golf course, a powerhouse, a sewage treatment plant, and a water pump station.

The 100-acre park had been supplied with a bluegrass lawn with 800 shade trees, and had the Clinch Mountain ridge as the backdrop.

The resort had its electricity generated from its own powerhouse, piping coal and steam-conducted heat into the structure. Bath water for guest bathrooms and the pool bathhouse was pumped from German Creek, and was contained in a large concrete reservoir located behind the luxury hotel. Drinking water was piped to the complex from a spring on-top of Clinch Mountain.

Tate Epson Water, which came from the mineral spring the resort was named after, was sold internationally as a tonic, and prescribed by many prominent physicians of late 19th and early 20th century.

=== Tate Springs Springhouse ===
- Tate Springs Springhouse
- U.S. National Register of Historic Places
- U.S. National Historic Landmark
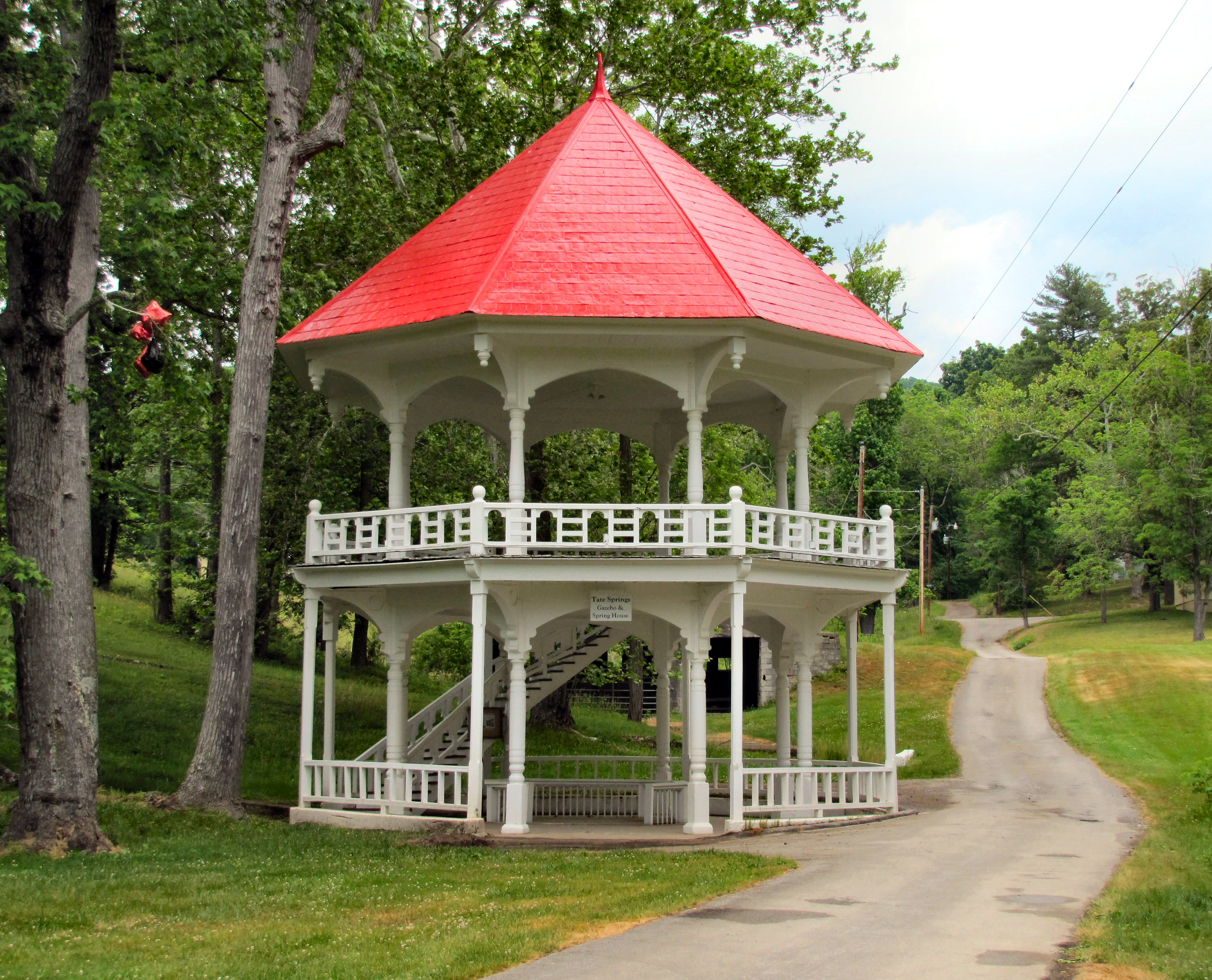
- Nearest city: Bean Station, Tennessee
- Area: 3 acres (1.2 ha)
- NRHP reference No.: 73001768
- Added to NRHP: April 13, 1973

Tate Springs Springhouse is a two-story Victorian-style springhouse southwest of Bean Station, Tennessee, that is listed on the National Register of Historic Places.

It is an octagonal-shaped wooden gazebo structure with a sloping red roof. It features a well that contains the mineral spring that the resort was founded upon.
