= Panther Creek State Park =

State park in Tennessee, United States

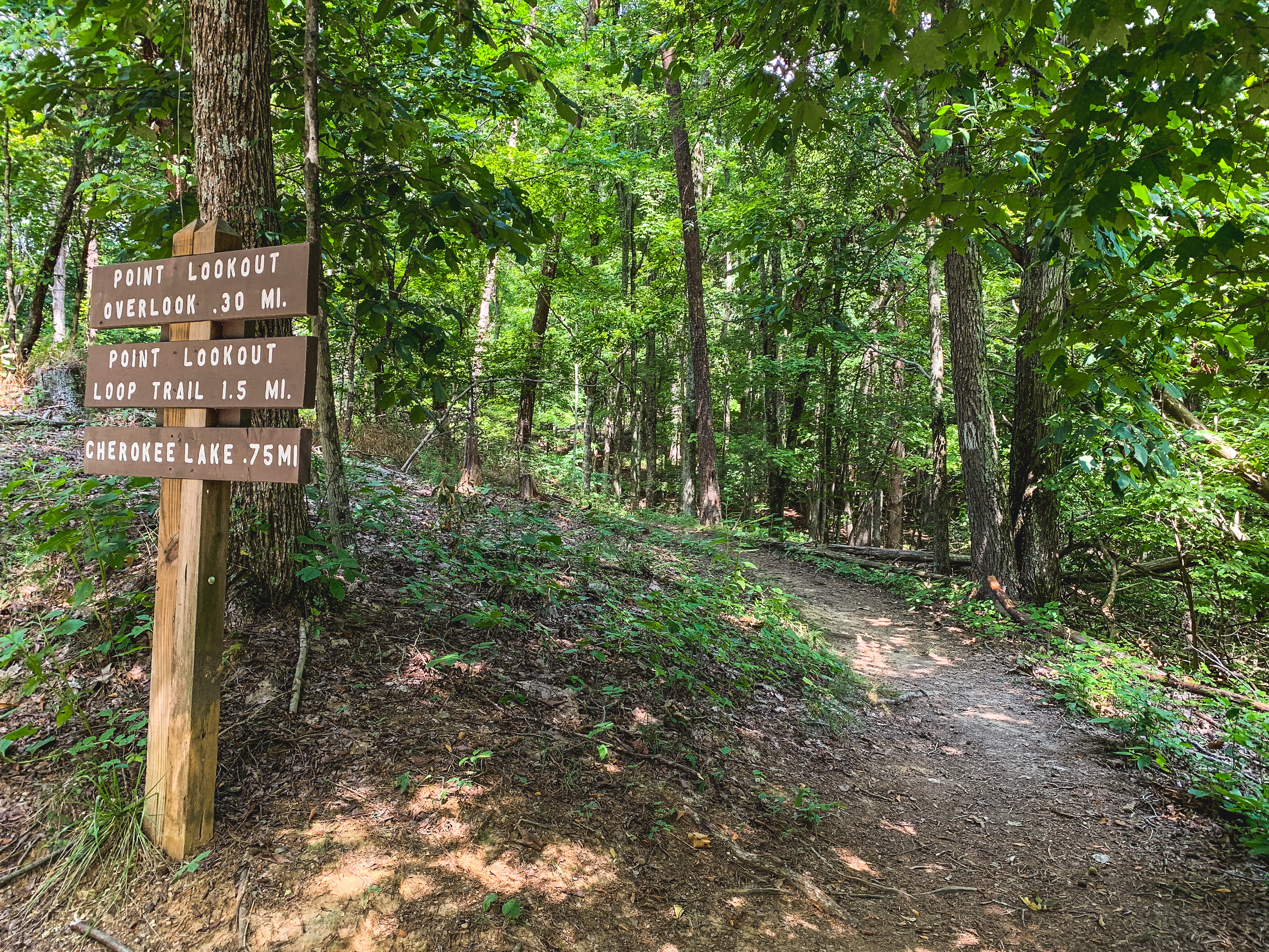
- Trailhead in Panther Creek State Park
- Interactive map of Panther Creek State Park
- Type: State park
- Location: Morristown, Tennessee, United States
- Coordinates: 36.213°N 83.407°W
- Area: 1,444 acres (5.84 km^{2})
- Operator: Tennessee Department of Environment and Conservation
- Open: Year-round
- Website: Panther Creek State Park

Panther Creek State Park is a state park in Morristown, Tennessee, United States. It is located prominently on the shore of Cherokee Lake, an impoundment of the Holston River, via the Cherokee Dam. The western terminus of Tennessee State Route 342 is located inside the park. The route connects the park to U.S. Route 11E (also known as Andrew Johnson Highway). The park has an area of approximately 1,444 acres (6 km^{2}).

== Amenities ==
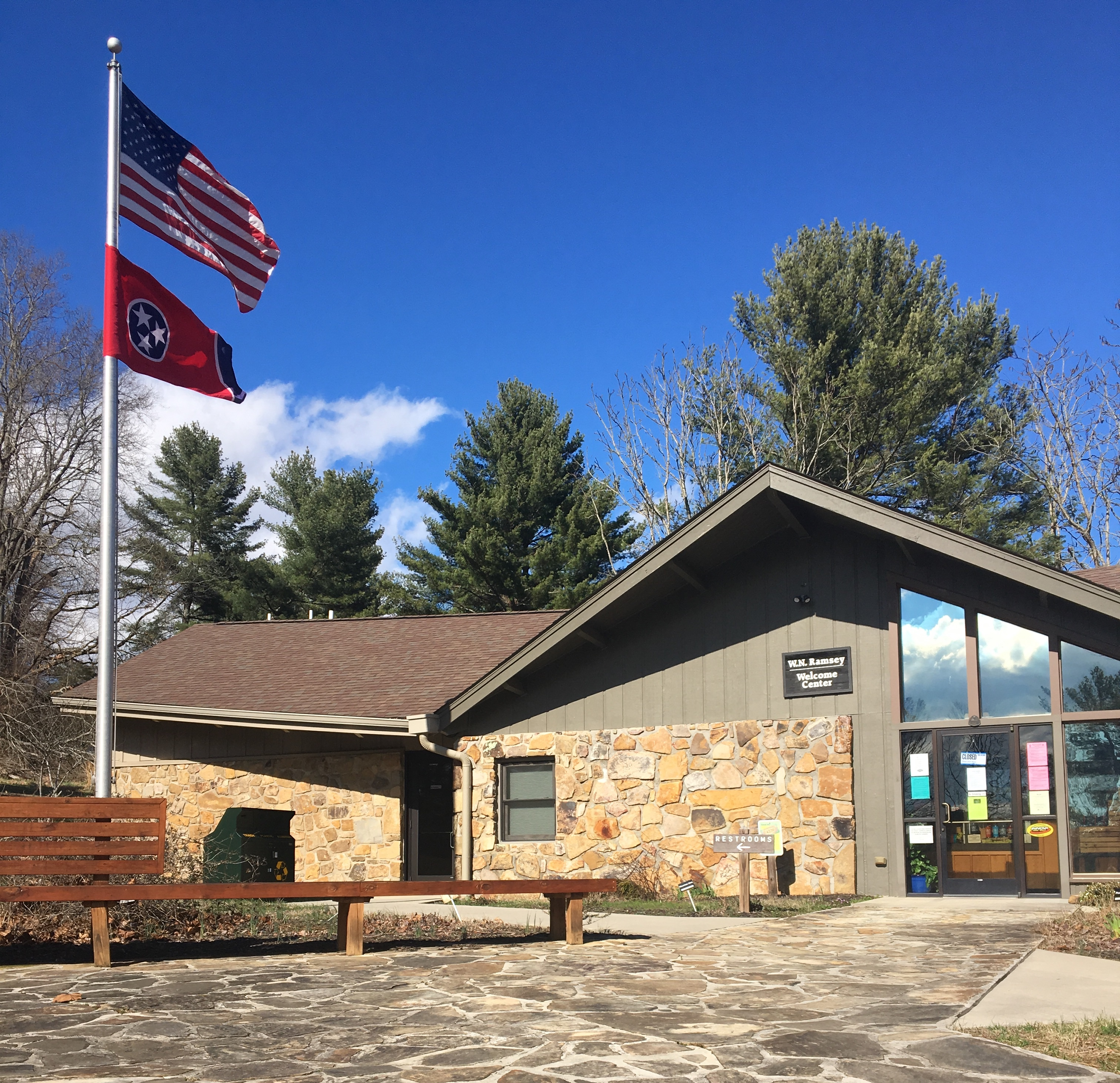
The W.N. Ramsey Welcome Center

Panther Creek State Park offers access to an on-site playground and a variety of recreational activities. These activities include paddling (kayaking, canoeing, and paddleboarding), disc golf, hiking, boating, biking, fishing, birding, horseback riding, and access to the pool and tennis courts.

=== Hiking ===
There are over 30 miles (48 km) of hiking trails in the park. Each trail is ranked as easy, moderate, or difficult.

=== Camping ===
Panther Creek has 50 campsites located on a loop and close to several trails. All campsites have access to water, electricity, and have picnic tables and fire rings. Eight of the campsites have access to sewer.

There are two bathhouses with hot showers and restrooms, a year-round laundromat, a dump station, and trading post.
