= WJDT =

- Rogersville, Tennessee; United States
- Broadcast area: Hamblen, Grainger, Hawkins, Greene, Jefferson, Hancock, and Cocke Counties
- Frequency: 106.5 MHz
- Branding: 106.5 WJDT

Programming
- Format: Country
- Affiliations: ABC News Radio; Compass Media Networks

Ownership
- Owner: Clark Quillen, David Quillen, and Beverly Quillen; (Cherokee Broadcasting LLC)
- Sister stations: WBGQ

Technical information
- Licensing authority: FCC
- Facility ID: 7950
- Class: A
- ERP: 300 watts
- HAAT: 420.0 meters (1,378.0 ft)
- Transmitter coordinates: 36°22′51.00″N 83°10′47.00″W

Links
- Public license information: Public file; LMS
- Webcast: Listen Live
- Website: wjdtfm.com

WJDT (106.5 FM) is a radio station broadcasting a country music format. Licensed to Cherokee Broadcasting LLC, the station is currently owned by Clark, David, and Beverly Quillen.
