= WBGQ =

Radio station in Bean Station, Tennessee

- Bulls Gap, Tennessee; United States
- Broadcast area: Morristown metropolitan area
- Frequency: 100.7 MHz
- Branding: Q-100.7

Programming
- Format: Hot adult contemporary
- Affiliations: Compass Media Networks

Ownership
- Owner: Clark Quillen, David Quillen, and Beverly Quillen; (Cherokee Broadcasting LLC)
- Sister stations: WJDT

Technical information
- Licensing authority: FCC
- Facility ID: 78711
- Class: A
- ERP: 330 watts
- HAAT: 384 meters
- Transmitter coordinates: 36°22′48″N 83°10′47″W

Links
- Public license information: Public file; LMS
- Webcast: Listen Live
- Website: wbgqfm.com

WBGQ (100.7 FM) ("Q100.7") is a radio station broadcasting a hot adult contemporary format, playing popular hits today. Branded as "Q100.7", the station serves the Lakeway Area of East Tennessee, including the cities of Morristown, Rogersville, Greeneville, Newport, Jefferson City. The station can be heard in Hamblen, Jefferson, Greene, Cocke, Grainger, Claiborne, Hawkins, Hancock and Union counties. The station is currently owned by Clark, David, and Beverly Quillen, through licensee Cherokee Broadcasting LLC.
