= Cherokee Dam =

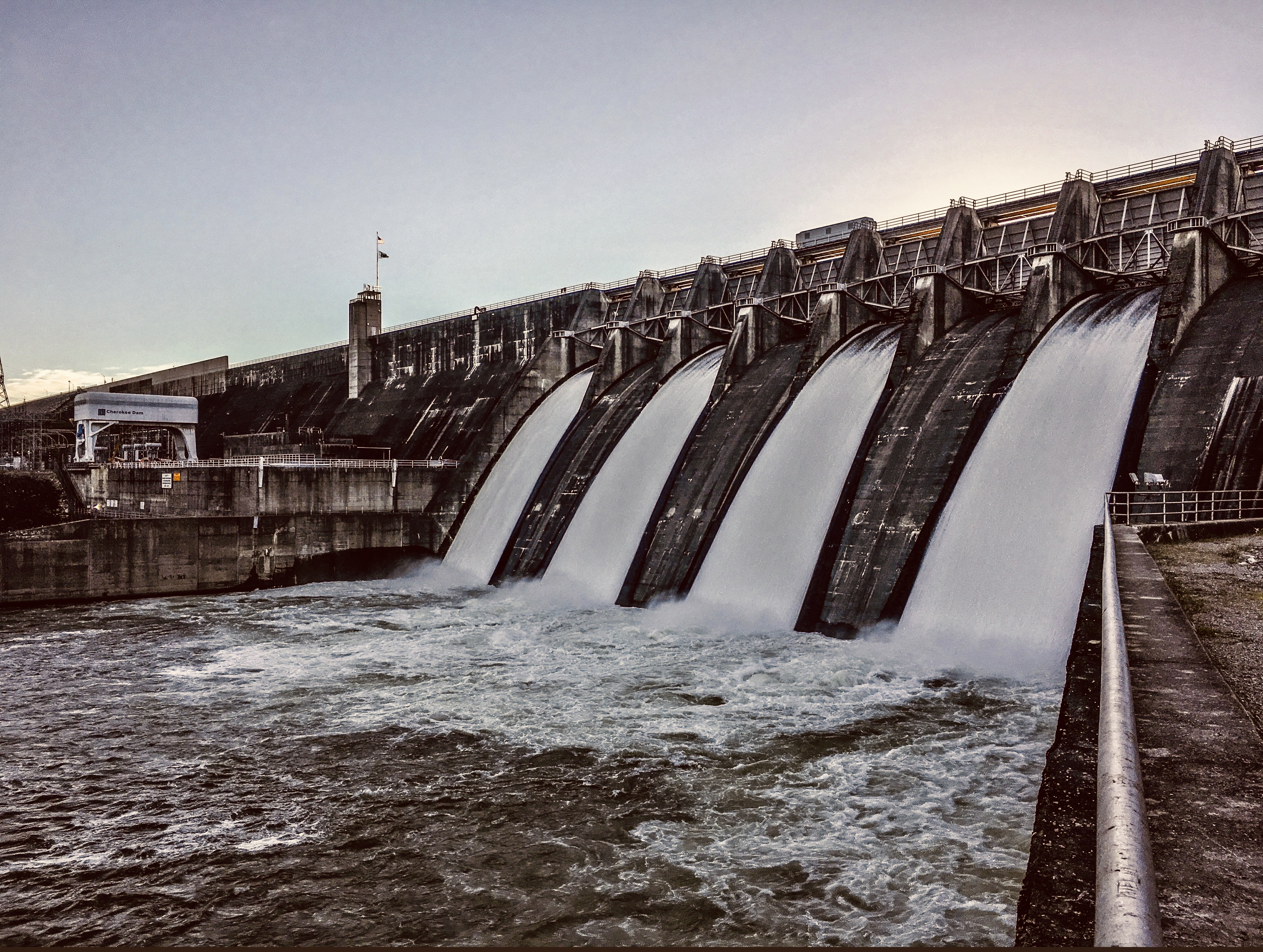
- Cherokee Dam

- Location within Tennessee
- Official name: Cherokee Dam
- Country: United States
- Location: Jefferson and Grainger counties, Tennessee
- Coordinates: 36°9′58″N 83°29′54″W
- Purpose: Flood control, electricity
- Construction began: August 1, 1940
- Opening date: December 5, 1941
- Construction cost: US$30.3 million (equivalent to $554,163,884 in 2025)
- Operator: Tennessee Valley Authority

Dam and spillways
- Impounds: Holston River
- Height: 175 feet (53 m)
- Length: 6,760 feet (2,060 m)

Reservoir
- Creates: Cherokee Lake
- Surface area: 28,780 acres (11,650 ha)
- Normal elevation: 1,047 ft (319 m)

Power Station
- Commission date: 1942-1953
- Type: hydroelectric
- Turbines: 2 x 35 MW, 2 x 33 MW Francis-type
- Installed capacity: 136 MW

Cherokee Dam is a hydroelectric dam located on the Holston River in Grainger County and Jefferson County, Tennessee, in the southeastern United States. The dam is operated and maintained by the Tennessee Valley Authority, which built the dam in the early 1940s to help meet urgent demands for energy at the outbreak of World War II. Cherokee Dam is 175 feet (53 m) high and impounds the 28,780-acre (11,650 ha) Cherokee Lake. It has a generating capacity of 136 megawatts. The dam was named for the Cherokee, a Native American tribe that controlled much of East Tennessee when the first European settlers arrived in the mid-18th century.

It was listed on the National Register of Historic Places in August 2017.

== Location ==
The South Fork and North Fork of the Holston River merge to form the Holston River proper in Kingsport, Tennessee, from which the river proceeds southwestward for just over 140 miles (230 km) across northeastern Tennessee before joining with the French Broad River in Knoxville to form the Tennessee River. Cherokee Dam is located approximately 52 miles (84 km) upstream from the Holston's mouth. The dam was built immediately downstream from a point where Mossy Creek, which flows northeastward from Jefferson City, joins the Holston to create a T-shaped formation. The dam's immediate headwaters and tailwaters still resemble this formation.

Cherokee Lake stretches for 59 miles (95 km) from the dam to the John Sevier Combined Cycle Plant just south of Rogersville, Tennessee, and includes parts of Jefferson, Grainger, Hamblen, and Hawkins counties. The lake's Mossy Creek embayment reaches all the way to the city limits of Jefferson City. Tennessee State Route 92 crosses the Holston just downstream from the dam.

== Background and construction ==
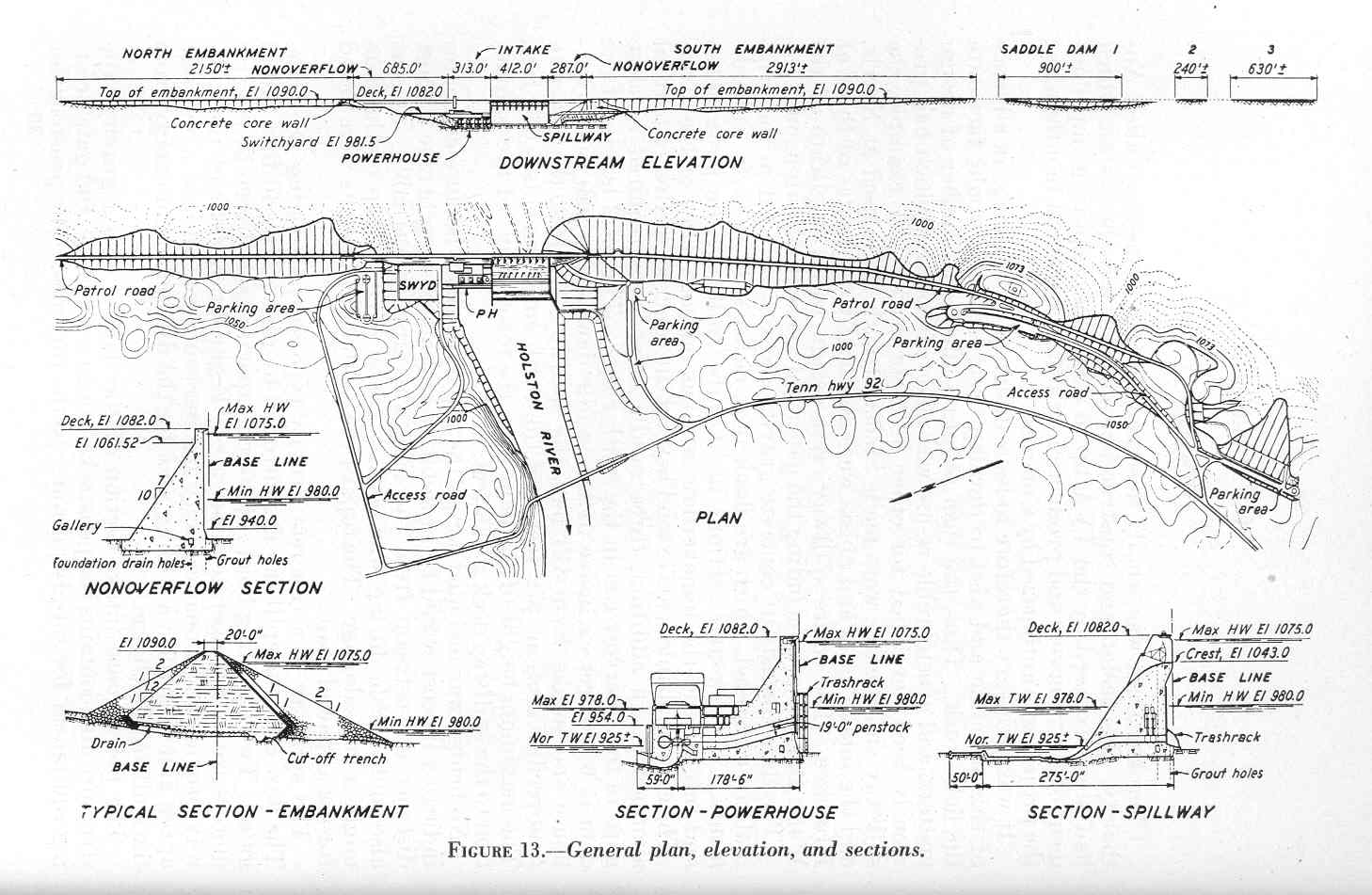
Design plan for Cherokee Dam, circa 1940

In 1940, with World War II raging across Europe, the United States government saw an urgent need to strengthen its military and defense infrastructure. This required a massive expansion of aluminum production facilities, many of which were located in the Tennessee Valley. To provide the necessary electricity, the Tennessee Valley Authority submitted a proposal for the construction of a new dam on the Holston River (the site— known as the "Mossy Creek site"— had already been selected and preliminary plans had been drawn up), the construction of a new coal plant (Watts Bar Fossil Plant, which operated 1942-1982) and for the expansion of the generating capacity of the existing Wilson and Pickwick Landing dams to Congress in July 1940 (the measure was later expanded to include construction of Douglas Dam, Fontana Dam, and several dams along the Hiwassee and Ocoee rivers). Congress approved funds for the measure within a few days and President Franklin D. Roosevelt signed the measure into law on July 1, 1940. Construction on Cherokee Dam began the following day.

The Cherokee project required the purchase of 45,158 acres (18,275 ha) of land, nearly 6,000 acres (2,400 ha) of which were wooded and required clearing. The project also required the relocation of 875 families, 51 cemeteries, and a historical tavern at Bean Station (which was the only major community that was flooded). The water supplies of Jefferson City and Morristown had to be modified, and 99 miles (159 km) of roadway had to be redirected. Fourteen new bridges were constructed and five existing bridges were raised above reservoir operating levels. Three earthen saddle dams, with a combined length of 1,770 feet (540 m), were constructed to fill gaps in the ridge immediately south of the main dam. As Congress eliminated a number bureaucratic obstacles regarding delivery of materials, construction proceeded at a smooth and rapid pace. On December 5, 1941, construction was completed, the gates were closed, and the reservoir began to fill. Power generation began on April 16, 1942, less than two years after the dam was first proposed.

== Operation and output ==
Cherokee Dam is a gravity-type concrete spillway dam consisting of nine crest gates and eight sluice gates (the latter allowing reservoir control when water level is low). The combined capacity of the dam's four hydroelectric generators is 135,200 kilowatts. Cherokee Lake has a flood-storage capacity of 749,406 acre-feet (924,379,000 m^{3}). The reservoir operates up to an elevation of 1,075 feet (328 m), and varies by 27 feet (8.2 m) in a typical year. The dam lacks navigational locks, although its design allows them to be added if the necessity for them should arise.

While Cherokee's primary purpose is hydroelectric power production, like other TVA dams it also helps control flooding, which was rampant in the Tennessee Valley before the 1930s. Numerous recreational areas exist along Cherokee Lake, including Panther Creek State Park, several smaller parks, and 20 public boat launches. The Tennessee Wildlife Resources Agency regularly stocks the lake with walleye, crappie, and hybrid striped bass for recreational fishing.

As the arrival of Hurricane Florence approached, the TVA released water at Cherokee from its spill gates. These spill gates were used for the first time since 1994.
