= 1975 in baseball =

The following are the baseball events of the year 1975 throughout the world.

== Champions ==
=== Major League Baseball ===
- World Series: Cincinnati Reds over Boston Red Sox (4–3); Pete Rose, MVP

League Championship Series (ALCS, NLCS)
East	Boston	3
West	Oakland	0
East	Pittsburgh	0
West	Cincinnati	3

World Series
AL	Boston	3
NL	Cincinnati	4

- All-Star Game, July 15 at County Stadium: National League, 6–3; Bill Madlock and Jon Matlack, MVPs

=== Other champions ===
- College World Series: Texas
- Japan Series: Hankyu Braves over Hiroshima Toyo Carp (4–0–1)
- Big League World Series: Taipei, Taiwan
- Little League World Series: Lakewood, New Jersey
- Senior League World Series: Pingtung, Taiwan
- Pan American Games: Cuba over United States
- Mexican Baseball League: Alijadores de Tampico over Cafeteros de Córdoba

Winter Leagues

- 1975 Caribbean Series: Vaqueros de Bayamón
- Dominican Republic League: Águilas Cibaeñas
- Mexican Pacific League: Naranjeros de Hermosillo over Mayos de Navojoa
- Puerto Rican League: Vaqueros de Bayamón
- Venezuelan League: Tigres de Aragua

== Awards and honors ==
- Baseball Hall of Fame
  - Earl Averill
  - Billy Herman
  - Judy Johnson
  - Ralph Kiner
  - Bucky Harris (manager)

Baseball Writers' Association of America Awards
BBWAA Award	National League	American League
Rookie of the Year	John Montefusco (SF)	Fred Lynn (BOS)
Cy Young Award	Tom Seaver (NYM)	Jim Palmer (BAL)
Most Valuable Player	Joe Morgan (CIN)	Fred Lynn (BOS)
Babe Ruth Award (World Series MVP)	—	Luis Tiant (BOS)
Gold Glove Awards
Position	National League	American League
Pitcher	Andy Messersmith (LAD)	Jim Kaat (CWS)
Catcher	Johnny Bench (CIN)	Thurman Munson (NYY)
1st Base	Steve Garvey (LAD)	George Scott (MIL)
2nd Base	Joe Morgan (CIN)	Bobby Grich (BAL)
3rd Base	Ken Reitz (STL)	Brooks Robinson (BAL)
Shortstop	Dave Concepción (CIN)	Mark Belanger (BAL)
Outfield	César Cedeño (HOU)	Paul Blair (BAL)
Outfield	César Gerónimo (CIN)	Fred Lynn (BOS)
Outfield	Garry Maddox (PHI/SF)	Joe Rudi (OAK)

== Statistical leaders ==
	American League		National League	
Stat	Player	Total	Player	Total
AVG	Rod Carew (MIN)	.359	Bill Madlock (CHC)	.354
HR	Reggie Jackson (OAK); George Scott (MIL)	36	Mike Schmidt (PHI)	38
RBI	George Scott (MIL)	109	Greg Luzinski (PHI)	120
W	Catfish Hunter (NYY); Jim Palmer (BAL)	23	Tom Seaver (NYM)	22
ERA	Jim Palmer (BAL)	2.09	Randy Jones (SD)	2.24
K	Frank Tanana (CAL)	269	Tom Seaver (NYM)	243

== Major league baseball final standings ==
=== American League final standings ===
AL East
Team	W	L	Pct.	GB	Home	Road
^{(2)} Boston Red Sox	95	65	.594	—	47‍–‍34	48‍–‍31
Baltimore Orioles	90	69	.566	4½	44‍–‍33	46‍–‍36
New York Yankees	83	77	.519	12	43‍–‍35	40‍–‍42
Cleveland Indians	79	80	.497	15½	41‍–‍39	38‍–‍41
Milwaukee Brewers	68	94	.420	28	36‍–‍45	32‍–‍49
Detroit Tigers	57	102	.358	37½	31‍–‍49	26‍–‍53

AL West
Team	W	L	Pct.	GB	Home	Road
^{(1)} Oakland Athletics	98	64	.605	—	54‍–‍27	44‍–‍37
Kansas City Royals	91	71	.562	7	51‍–‍30	40‍–‍41
Texas Rangers	79	83	.488	19	39‍–‍41	40‍–‍42
Minnesota Twins	76	83	.478	20½	39‍–‍43	37‍–‍40
Chicago White Sox	75	86	.466	22½	42‍–‍39	33‍–‍47
California Angels	72	89	.447	25½	35‍–‍46	37‍–‍43

Locations of teams for the 1974–1975 American League seasons
West East

=== National League final standings ===
NL East
Team	W	L	Pct.	GB	Home	Road
^{(2)} Pittsburgh Pirates	92	69	.571	—	52‍–‍28	40‍–‍41
Philadelphia Phillies	86	76	.531	6½	51‍–‍30	35‍–‍46
New York Mets	82	80	.506	10½	42‍–‍39	40‍–‍41
St. Louis Cardinals	82	80	.506	10½	45‍–‍36	37‍–‍44
Chicago Cubs	75	87	.463	17½	42‍–‍39	33‍–‍48
Montreal Expos	75	87	.463	17½	39‍–‍42	36‍–‍45

NL West
Team	W	L	Pct.	GB	Home	Road
^{(1)} Cincinnati Reds	108	54	.667	—	64‍–‍17	44‍–‍37
Los Angeles Dodgers	88	74	.543	20	49‍–‍32	39‍–‍42
San Francisco Giants	80	81	.497	27½	46‍–‍35	34‍–‍46
San Diego Padres	71	91	.438	37	38‍–‍43	33‍–‍48
Atlanta Braves	67	94	.416	40½	37‍–‍43	30‍–‍51
Houston Astros	64	97	.398	43½	37‍–‍44	27‍–‍53

Locations of teams for the 1971–1976 National League seasons
West East

== Nippon Professional Baseball final standings ==
=== Central League final standings ===
Central League
Team	G	W	L	T	Pct.	GB
Hiroshima Toyo Carp	130	72	47	11	.605	--
Chunichi Dragons	130	69	53	8	.566	4.5
Hanshin Tigers	130	68	55	7	.553	6.0
Yakult Swallows	130	57	64	9	.471	16.0
Taiyo Whales	130	51	69	10	.425	21.5
Yomiuri Giants	130	47	76	7	.382	27.0

=== Pacific League final standings ===
Pacific League
Team	G	W	L	T	Pct.	1st half ranking	2nd half ranking
Hankyu Braves	130	64	59	7	.520	1	6
Kintetsu Buffaloes	130	71	50	9	.587	3	1
Taiheiyo Club Lions	130	58	62	10	.483	2	4
Lotte Orions	130	59	65	6	.476	6	2
Nankai Hawks	130	57	65	8	.467	5	3
Nippon-Ham Fighters	130	55	63	12	.466	4	4

== Events ==
The year will see the two Major League Baseball teams located in the San Francisco Bay Area ponder possible relocation scenarios.

- The proposed sale of the Chicago White Sox presents opportunities for Charlie Finley's Oakland Athletics. A group from Seattle is ready to purchase the White Sox and move them there. With Chicago the site of Finley's insurance business headquarters, he is prepared to move his Athletics there to take the White Sox's place. But, due to his 20-year stadium lease with the city of Oakland (to expire in 1987), Finley is blocked. In December, Bill Veeck buys the Chicago White Sox from owner John Allyn and keeps them in Chicago.
- Meanwhile, plunging attendance and cash flow problems create an ownership crisis for the San Francisco Giants. The financial woes facing club president Horace Stoneham—who moved the Giants to California in 1958, and whose father purchased the team in 1919 when it was based in New York—force him to put the team on the market during the summer. By the end of 1975, the most likely outcome sees the team being sold to a Canadian group that plans to move them to Toronto.

=== January ===
- January 5 – Tragedy strikes the Houston Astros when starting pitcher Don Wilson, 29, and his five-year-old son die by accidental carbon monoxide poisoning at their Houston home. His wife and nine-year-old daughter are hospitalized but survive. Author of two no-hitters and a 1971 National League All-Star, Wilson has posted double-digit victory seasons in each of his eight full MLB seasons; a workhorse, he also exceeded 180 innings pitched in each of those campaigns. The Astros retire Wilson's #40 when the 1975 season begins. (See Deaths entry for this date below.)
- January 16 – Harmon Killebrew, 38, is released by the Minnesota Twins. The future Baseball Hall of Famer, a 13-time American League All-Star and the 1969 Most Valuable Player, has hit 559 home runs for the franchise over 21 seasons, and his #3 uniform will be retired. Eight days later, Killebrew signs with the Kansas City Royals.

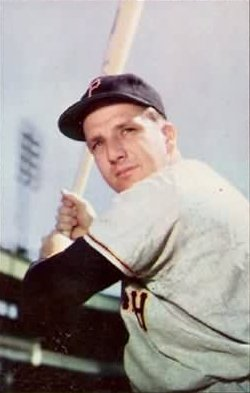
Ralph Kiner

- January 22 – The New York Mets sign free agent pitcher Juan Berenguer.
- January 23 – Slugger Ralph Kiner, who led or co-led the National League in home runs seven years in a row (1946–1952), is elected to the Hall of Fame by the Baseball Writers' Association of America. He earns his Hall of Fame membership by a single vote.

=== February ===
- February 3 – Former second baseman Billy Herman, outfielder Earl Averill and manager Bucky Harris are selected for the Baseball Hall of Fame by the Special Veterans Committee.
- February 6 - The Detroit Tigers released outfielder Jim Nettles.
- February 10 – The Special Committee on the Negro Leagues picks Judy Johnson for the Hall of Fame.
- February 25:
  - The Baltimore Orioles trade pitcher Don Hood and first baseman Boog Powell to the Cleveland Indians in exchange for catcher Dave Duncan and minor leaguer Alvin McGrew. The trade reunites the veteran Powell with his former Baltimore teammate Frank Robinson, now the Indians' player-manager.
  - The Indians also acquire southpaw relief pitcher Dave LaRoche, along with outfielder Brock Davis, from the Chicago Cubs for right-hander Milt Wilcox.
- February 28 – The New York Mets purchase the contract of right-handed slugger Dave Kingman, 26, from the San Francisco Giants for $150,000. He will bash 73 home runs for them over the next two full seasons and make the 1976 NL All-Star team during his first term as a Met.

=== March ===
- March 4 - The Baltimore Orioles signed pitcher and current fugitive from justice Byron McLaughlin.
- March 5 – The Boston Red Sox sign Tony Conigliaro as a free agent. Conigliaro, 30, returns to the hometown team where he starred during the 1960s until an August 18, 1967 beanball compromised his vision, sidelined him for the full 1968 season, and drove his early retirement from the California Angels in July of 1971. Conigliaro is trying to make a comeback for the 1975 Red Sox as their designated hitter.
- March 6 - The Milwaukee Brewers purchase the contract of Kurt Bevacqua from the Kansas City Royals.
- March 15 – The Los Angeles Dodgers sign future Hall-of-Fame pitcher Juan Marichal, 37-year-old former longtime ace of the arch-rival San Francisco Giants, as a free agent.
- March 21 – Georgia Tech shuts out Earlham, 41–0, setting an NCAA record for scoring and for winning margin.
- March 27 – The Pittsburgh Pirates release their former top starting pitcher, Steve Blass. A 103-game winner in a Pittsburgh uniform, a hero of the Bucs' 1971 World Series triumph (two complete game victories, no losses, 1.00 earned run average), and the 1972 runner-up for the NL Cy Young Award, Blass suddenly and inexplicably developed severe control problems in 1973, forcing his retirement at age 32. He will go on to spend 34 years as a member of the Pirates' broadcasting team.
- March 29 – The New York Yankees release former ace starting pitcher Mel Stottlemyre, who won 164 games for them over an 11-year (1964–1974) career.

=== April ===
- April 4 – The Pittsburgh Pirates release infielder Tony La Russa, 30, from his minor league contract. He signs a Triple-A pact three days later with the Chicago White Sox and will continue his playing career into 1977 in the organizations of the White Sox and the St. Louis Cardinals—two teams he will later manage during his Hall-of-Fame career.
- April 5 – The Pirates obtain veteran outfielder Bill Robinson from the Philadelphia Phillies for right-hander Wayne Simpson. Robinson will be a key contributor to the Bucs' 1979 world-championship season.
- April 6:
  - The Atlanta Braves sell the contract of pitcher Joe Niekro to the Houston Astros for $35,000. Niekro, 30, will pitch for Houston for almost 11 full seasons; he will rack up two 20-win campaigns (1979, 1980), and capture 144 victories in his 397 games in an Astro uniform.
  - The defending world champion Oakland Athletics pick up an important bullpen arm, Jim Todd, from the Chicago Cubs for cash and a "PTBNL" (outfielder Champ Summers, who is added to the deal April 29). Todd will finish with 12 saves and 31 games finished, second only to Oakland's Hall-of-Fame closer, Rollie Fingers.
- April 7 – The Los Angeles Dodgers and Cincinnati Reds, who battled each other for supremacy in the National League West in 1974, open the NL season at Riverfront Stadium, with Cincinnati winning 2–1 in 14 innings.

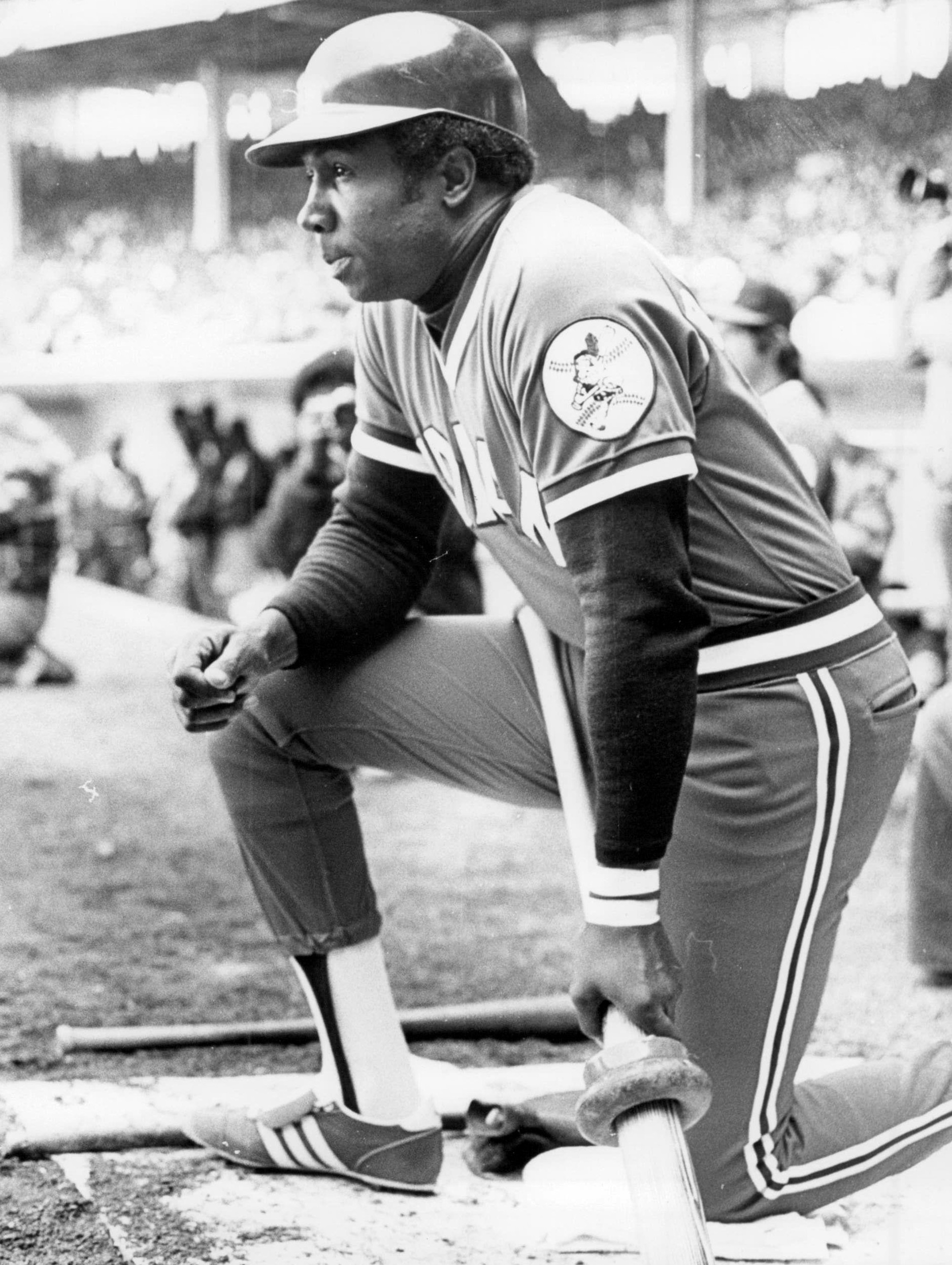
Player-manager Frank Robinson in 1975

- April 8:
  - Hall of Fame outfielder Frank Robinson becomes the first African American man to manage a Major League Baseball team, leading the Cleveland Indians to a 5–3 victory over the New York Yankees. Robinson homers in his first at bat as a playing manager; Boog Powell, Robinson's longtime teammate in Baltimore, adds another solo blow in the fourth. Both homers are off Yankee starter Doc Medich. A crowd of 56,715 watch the historic game at Cleveland Stadium.
  - Lyman Bostock makes his MLB debut for the Minnesota Twins, getting one hit in four at bats against the Texas Rangers. Bostock will become a star, batting .311 in 526 games, before his life comes to a tragic end in late September 1978 when he is shot while sitting in a parked car at age 27.
- April 11:
  - Hank Aaron returns to Milwaukee as a member of the Brewers, then in the American League. A crowd of 48,160 fans watches Aaron drive in a run in the Brewers' 6–2 victory over the Cleveland Indians. Aaron starred for the Milwaukee Braves for a dozen years before the franchise moved to Atlanta for the 1966 season.
  - At Memorial Stadium, Tony Conigliaro homers off southpaw Mike Cuellar of the Baltimore Orioles in the third game of his comeback attempt. The solo shot helps his Boston Red Sox triumph, 6–5. Conigliaro has been out of baseball for nearly four full years, as he battles vision problems.
- April 14 – Days after he is released by the New York Yankees, pitcher Skip Lockwood is signed by the Oakland A's.
- April 15 – In his final major league appearance, Los Angeles Dodgers pitcher Juan Marichal gives up six hits in 21/3 innings against the Cincinnati Reds before Rick Rhoden relieves him.

=== May ===
- May 1 – Hank Aaron goes 4-for-4, driving in two runs in the Milwaukee Brewers' 17–3 win over the Detroit Tigers. This brings his career RBI total to 2,211, breaking Babe Ruth's published record of 2,209. On February 3, 1976, the Records Committee will revise Ruth's total to 2,204, meaning that in actuality, Aaron set the record on April 18.
- May 2 – The Los Angeles Dodgers trade pitchers Eddie Solomon and Geoff Zahn to the Chicago Cubs in exchange for pitcher Burt Hooton, 25. Hooton will win 18 games for the 1975 Dodgers and be a key member of three NL pennant winners, including 1981's world champions.
- May 4:
  - The San Francisco Giants beat the Houston Astros 8–6 in the first game of a doubleheader at Candlestick Park. In the second inning, Houston's Bob Watson scores what is calculated as the major leagues' one-millionth run of all time, as Milt May hits John Montefusco's first pitch to drive him home. Meanwhile, Dave Concepción of the Cincinnati Reds hits a home run at about the same moment and races around the bases, but Watson, running from second base, scores first. Cincinnati loses to Atlanta, 3–2. (On April 22, 1876, the opening game of the National League's first-ever season, the Boston Red Caps came out ahead of the Philadelphia Athletics by the score of 6–5. Athletics first baseman Wes Fisler scored the very first run in major league history.)
  - The Philadelphia Phillies acquire centerfielder Garry Maddox from the San Francisco Giants for first baseman Willie Montañez. Maddox will win eight consecutive Gold Glove Awards, starting this season, patrolling center field for the Phillies as they transform into consistent pennant contenders in the National League.
  - At 5 a.m., the New York Mets' Cleon Jones is arrested for indecent exposure in St. Petersburg, Florida after police find him naked in a van with a teenaged girl who is holding a stash of narcotics. Although the charges are later dropped, Mets board chairman M. Donald Grant fines Jones $2,000, four times as much as a Met has ever been assessed before, and forces Jones to publicly apologize during a press conference held in New York, with his wife, Angela, by his side.
- May 5 – The Oakland Athletics release pinch runner Herb Washington, the world-class sprinter who played in 104 major league games without batting, pitching or fielding. On the bases, Washington stole 31 bags and scored 33 runs. His 1975 trading card (#407) is the only Topps card ever issued showing the player's position as "pinch runner".
- May 7 – Paul Owens, the aggressive general manager of the Philadelphia Phillies, makes another trade, reacquiring 1960s Phil slugging star Dick Allen and backup catcher Johnny Oates from the Atlanta Braves for catcher Jim Essian, outfielder Barry Bonnell and $150,000.
- May 9 – The San Francisco Giants deal former ace left-hander Ron Bryant to the St. Louis Cardinals for outfielder Larry Herndon and minor-league southpaw Tony González. Bryant won 24 games for the 1973 Giants, but he will pitch in only ten more games for the 1975 Redbirds before exiting the majors.
- May 10 – In a triumphant return to the East Bay, Catfish Hunter of the New York Yankees shuts out the three-time defending world champion Athletics, his former team, on two hits, 3–0, at the Oakland Coliseum. Hunter faces 28 hitters, only one over the minimum, in winning his third game against four defeats. He had departed the Athletics as a free agent thanks to an arbitrator's ruling in December 1974, then signed a multi-year, multi-million-dollar contract with the Yankees.
- May 15 – After a curfew halts their 2–2 tie in the 14th inning at Arlington Stadium earlier today, the Milwaukee Brewers eke out a one-run victory over the Texas Rangers when the game resumes in the top of the 15th. The winning run crosses the plate when Milwaukee's Don Money is hit by a pitch with the bases loaded.
- May 25:
  - Dennis Eckersley, in his first major league start, hurls a three-hit shutout as the Cleveland Indians beat the Oakland Athletics, 6–0.
  - Mickey Lolich's 200th career victory is a rain-shortened, 4–1 win for his Detroit Tigers over the Chicago White Sox. His catcher is Bill Freehan, who also caught him in his first major league start on May 21, 1963.
- May 28 – The Atlanta Braves trade ten-year team veteran and former All-Star pitcher Ron Reed and outfielder Wayne Nordhagen ("PTBNL)" to the St. Louis Cardinals for pitchers Ray Sadecki and Elias Sosa.
- May 30 – Willie McCovey pinch-hits a grand slam to lift the San Diego Padres over the New York Mets, 6–2. It is McCovey's third career pinch slam, tying the major league record held by Ron Northey and Rich Reese. It is also his 16th lifetime bases-loaded homer, tying the National League record held by Hank Aaron.
- May 31 – César Tovar gets the Texas Rangers' only hit in Catfish Hunter's 6–0 victory. It's the fifth time in his career that Tovar has spoiled no-hitters by getting his club's lone safety. Future Hall-of-Famer Hunter, in his first season with the New York Yankees, improves his record to 7–5 (3.05) and nine complete games.

=== June ===
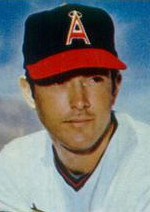
Nolan Ryan

- June 1 – The California Angels' Nolan Ryan pitches his fourth career no-hitter, winning 1–0 over the Baltimore Orioles, to tie the record set by Sandy Koufax. Ryan's win is his career win 100th. He walks four and strikes out nine.
- June 3 – The Chicago Cubs select future Baseball Hall of Fame closer Lee Smith in the second round of an otherwise drab June amateur draft. He signs with the Cubs 17 days later.
- June 4 – Center-fielder Willie Davis' stay in the American League lasts only 42 games, when the Texas Rangers send him to the St. Louis Cardinals for shortstop Ed Brinkman and pitcher Tommy Moore. After 14 seasons with the Los Angeles Dodgers, Davis has now been traded for the third time in 18 months.
- June 6 – Luis Tiant wins his 100th game with the Boston Red Sox, defeating Kansas City 1–0. Boston's other 100+ winners include Cy Young, Mel Parnell, Smoky Joe Wood, Joe Dobson and Lefty Grove. Carl Yastrzemski draws a walk in the game, his 1,452nd, tying him for 10th on the all-time list with Jimmie Foxx.
- June 7 – The Kansas City Royals sign pitcher Dan Quisenberry as an undrafted free agent.
- June 8:
  - Against the Detroit Tigers at Oakland–Alameda County Coliseum, Ken Holtzman of the Oakland Athletics has a no-hitter broken up with two out in the ninth on a Tom Veryzer double, the only hit he will allow in a 4–0 victory. Holtzman, having pitched two no-hitters in the National League (as a Chicago Cub in 1969 and 1971), was bidding to join Cy Young and Jim Bunning as the only pitchers to hurl no-hitters in both leagues.
  - A 17-inning marathon at Cleveland Stadium sees the Texas Rangers outlast the Indians in the second game of a Sunday doubleheader.
- June 13 – The Rangers add future Hall-of-Famer Gaylord Perry to their starting rotation, acquiring the 36-year-old hurler from the Indians for pitchers Jim Bibby, Jackie Brown and Rick Waits and $100,000. Perry is 6–9 with ten complete games in 15 appearances for Cleveland.
- June 14:
  - The Boston Red Sox acquire second baseman Denny Doyle from the California Angels for cash and a PTBNL (minor-league pitcher Chuck Ross). The left-handed-hitting Doyle homers in his first at bat for Boston the next day. He will platoon with Doug Griffin and bat .310 during the regular season, then start at second base for each of Boston's ten postseason games.
  - Two outfielders change teams when the Milwaukee Brewers swap Johnny Briggs to the Minnesota Twins for Bobby Darwin.
- June 15:
  - The Oakland Athletics acquire starting pitcher Stan Bahnsen and southpaw reliever Skip Pitlock from the Chicago White Sox for left-hander Dave Hamilton and 20-year-old outfield prospect Chet Lemon.
  - The Baltimore Orioles send pitcher Jesse Jefferson to the White Sox for first baseman Tony Muser.
- June 18 – Rookie Fred Lynn drives in ten runs with three home runs, a triple and a single during Boston's 15–1 drubbing of the Tigers in Detroit. Lynn's 16 total bases tie an American League record.
- June 23 – Injury-plagued Boston Red Sox catcher Carlton Fisk appears in an official game for the first time in almost a calendar year in an 11–3 Cleveland Indians victory at Fenway Park. Future Hall-of-Famer Fisk has been sidelined since June 28, 1974—first with knee surgery that ended his 1974 season after 52 games, then with a broken forearm suffered during spring training that kept him out of the lineup for the Red Sox's' first 63 games of 1975. He will stay healthy, however, throughout the rest of this season, the ALCS, and all seven games of the 1975 World Series.
- June 29 – The scorching Cincinnati Reds win their 27th game in their last 34 attempts by defeating the San Diego Padres, 4–1, in the first game of a doubleheader at Riverfront Stadium. The streak, which began May 21, has seen "The Big Red Machine" rise from five games behind the Los Angeles Dodgers in the National League West to 7½ games in front.

=== July ===
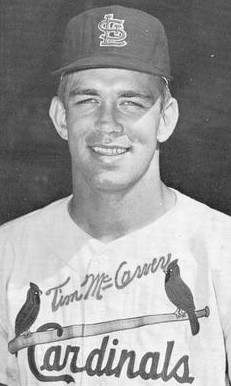
Tim McCarver in 1965

- July 1 – The Philadelphia Phillies sign veteran free-agent catcher Tim McCarver, released by the Boston Red Sox on June 23. McCarver's second tour of duty in Philadelphia will see him play a valuable role through the rest of the 1970s as a left-handed pinch hitter and Steve Carlton's personal catcher; Carlton will win 81 of 126 decisions (.391) with McCarver behind the plate.
- July 2 – For the second time in less than a month, an American League pitcher has a no-hitter broken up with two out in the ninth after having pitched one in the National League. In the first game of a doubleheader at Milwaukee County Stadium, Boston Red Sox pitcher Rick Wise has the bid foiled by a George Scott two-run home run. Wise gives up another home run to Bobby Darwin one batter later, but holds on to win, 6–3. Like Ken Holtzman, whose bid for a third career no-hitter was foiled with two out in the ninth on June 8, Wise had no-hit the Cincinnati Reds at Riverfront Stadium in 1971. In the same game, Boston's Jim Rice hits a home run that comes within four rows of exiting the stadium. Cecil Fielder will become the only player to hit a home run completely out of the stadium, in 1991.
- July 4:
  - At Veterans Stadium, the New York Mets' Jerry Grote steps in as a pinch hitter for starting pitcher Tom Seaver against longtime battery-mate Tug McGraw, who had been traded to the Philadelphia Phillies during the off-season. With the Mets down 3–2, Grote connects for a game-winning two-run home run. Without McGraw to rely on in the Mets' bullpen, Rick Baldwin relieves Seaver, and earns the save.
  - The standings after today's holiday action at the unofficial halfway point of the 1975 season see one tight divisional race: the American League East, where the Boston Red Sox (42–35) and Milwaukee Brewers (43–36) are in a virtual tie, with the New York Yankees (41–37) only 1½ games in arrears. In the American League West, the Oakland Athletics (50–29) lead the Kansas City Royals by six; in the National League East, the Pittsburgh Pirates (47–31) lead the Philadelphia Phillies by four; and in the National League West, the Cincinnati Reds (52–29) hold an eight-game margin over the Los Angeles Dodgers.
  - The Boston Red Sox acquire right-hander Jim Willoughby from the St. Louis Cardinals as the "player to be named later" in an April 4 trade that sent shortstop Mario Guerrero to St. Louis. Willoughby will contribute eight saves and team with Dick Drago to strengthen Boston's bullpen during their pennant run and postseason.
- July 11 – The nightmare season for the last-place Houston Astros (32–57) continues when creditors force owner Roy Hofheinz, one of two National League West magnates in financial straits (Horace Stoneham is the other), to surrender day-to-day-control of the team. Sidney Shlenker becomes club president, and he fires general manager Spec Richardson. Assistant GM John Mullen becomes acting front-office boss.
- July 15:
  - At Milwaukee County Stadium, the National League rallies for three runs in the ninth inning to win the All-Star Game over the American League, 6–3. Bill Madlock and the Mets' Jon Matlack share the MVP award. The game also marks the last of Hank Aaron's record-tying (along with Stan Musial and Willie Mays) 24th All-Star appearance; he lines out to Dave Concepción as a pinch hitter in the second inning. This appearance, like his first in 1955, was before a home crowd at Milwaukee County Stadium.
  - In the midsummer MLB owners' meeting, held concurrently in Milwaukee, the National League triumphs again. This time, it beats back an attempt by three American League owners—Jerry Hoffberger, Charlie Finley and George Steinbrenner—to unseat Commissioner of Baseball Bowie Kuhn. The "Dump Bowie" coup ultimately falters when Steinbrenner changes his vote, and Kuhn is re-elected to a second, seven-year term as baseball's "czar."
- July 17 – For the second consecutive Chicago White Sox game, Wilbur Wood is the starter, and he tosses his second consecutive shutout, beating the Detroit Tigers 5–0. The two starts were separated by the All-Star game.
- July 19 – In a game between the Minnesota Twins and New York Yankees that starts July 12 at Shea Stadium and ends 16 innings later on July 19 at Metropolitan Stadium in Minnesota (with the Yankees the "home" side), Lou Piniella's RBI single gives the Bombers an 8–7, come-from-behind win over the Twins.
- July 20:
  - A May 15 game between the Montreal Expos and Atlanta Braves that was initially called off because of rain during the fourth inning (with the Braves leading 4–1) is resumed from that point after Atlanta manager Clyde King successfully protests the cancellation, claiming the umpiring crew did not wait long enough or test the Fulton County Stadium field before sending everyone home. Today, with a different crew in place, the May 15 game ends with the Braves hanging on to win, 5–4, in nine innings as part of a Sunday doubleheader. Phil Niekro, who started the May contest, returns to the Braves' mound and goes 41/3 more innings to secure the victory.
  - Not even a year since leading the Texas Rangers to a surprising 84–76, second-place finish, manager Billy Martin is fired with the Rangers 44–51 and in fourth place, 15½ games behind in the American League West. Third-base coach Frank Lucchesi, former Philadelphia Phillies' pilot, replaces him. It's the third time Martin has been fired (by three different clubs) since October 1969.
- July 21 – Félix Millán of the New York Mets has four consecutive singles but is wiped out each time when Joe Torre grounds into four consecutive double plays, tying a major league record. New York loses 6–2 to the Houston Astros. Torre is the first National Leaguer to do so.
- July 23 – Another managerial firing rocks the American League West, when the Kansas City Royals (50–46) dismiss third-year pilot Jack McKeon and replace him with Whitey Herzog, who had been third-base coach of the California Angels. For Herzog, the Royals' job represents a career-saving opportunity after his dismal 1973 season at the helm of the Texas Rangers. Restoring batting coach Charley Lau to his former role, Herzog leads Kansas City to a 41–25 mark for the rest of 1975, then three consecutive division championships from 1976 through 1978.
- July 24 – Tom Seaver fans Dan Driessen of the Cincinnati Reds in the second inning for his 2,000th career strikeout. The Reds win, 2–1.
- July 27:
  - Left-handers Bill Lee and Roger Moret each spin complete-game shutouts, enabling the Boston Red Sox to sweep the New York Yankees at Shea Stadium, 1–0 and 6–0, pushing the Yankees to eight full games behind them in the American League East. Rookie sensation Fred Lynn scores Game 1's only run in the ninth inning, then, in the bottom half of the frame, robs Graig Nettles of an extra-base hit with a spectacular, full-extension leaping catch of Nettles' drive to left-center. In Game 2, Ron Guidry, later to be known as "Louisiana Lightning," makes his Yankee debut. He pitches two innings of relief and gives up three hits in Boston's one-sided triumph, and strikes out three.
  - The New York Mets release longtime left fielder Cleon Jones, who had been suspended by manager Yogi Berra for refusing to enter a July 18 game as a defensive replacement after a pinch-hitting appearance.

=== August ===
- August 2 – At Shea Stadium, the New York Yankees defeat the Cleveland Indians 5–3 in Billy Martin's debut as Yankee manager. This will be Martin's first of five stints as the Bombers' manager through 1988; he had played for them from 1950–1953 and 1955–1957 as a key part of five World Series champions. Martin had replaced the fired Bill Virdon the day before. Virdon, the reigning 1974 The Sporting News Manager of the Year, departs the Bronx with a 142–124 (.534) record; the Yankees are 53–51 and ten games behind the Boston Red Sox when the change takes place.
- August 5:
  - Pitcher Bill Bonham of the Chicago Cubs gives up seven consecutive hits to the first seven batters he faces in a game against the Philadelphia Phillies. He fails to record a single out before he's pulled for relief pitcher Ken Crosby. Crosby proceeds to give up a hit to Johnny Oates as the Phillies defeat the Cubs, 13–5.
  - Reserve catcher Duffy Dyer of the Pittsburgh Pirates leads off the home half of the 15th inning by homering off Bob Apodaca, giving the first-place Bucs a 5–4 triumph over the New York Mets, Dyer's former longtime team.
- August 6 – In the throes of a five-game losing streak, including a doubleheader loss to the Montreal Expos by twin 7–0 shutouts today, the 56–53 New York Mets fire manager Yogi Berra and replace him with coach and interim skipper Roy McMillan. Berra has managed the Mets since April 7, 1972, leading them to the 1973 National League pennant and a 292–296 (.497) regular-season record. After the Mets go only 26–27 under McMillan, they hire veteran minor-league manager Joe Frazier as their 1976 skipper on October 4.
- August 7 – The Houston Astros name a new general manager: former Houston executive Tal Smith, who has been the New York Yankees' EVP/baseball operations since October 1973. Smith will rebuild the Astros into National League West contenders in the coming years.

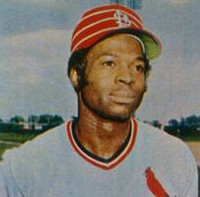
Lou Brock

- August 9:
  - Davey Lopes steals his 32nd consecutive base for the Los Angeles Dodgers without being caught, in a 2–0 win over the New York Mets. This breaks the major league record set by Max Carey in 1922.
  - The St. Louis Cardinals' Lou Brock gets his 2,500th hit. It comes versus the San Diego Padres, a single in the sixth off Dave Freisleben at Busch Memorial Stadium.
- August 14 – Atlanta Braves pitcher Phil Niekro hits the only triple of his Major League career, off of Lynn McGlothen of the St. Louis Cardinals.
- August 15 – The Detroit Tigers lose their 19th consecutive game, falling to the California Angels and Frank Tanana, 8–0 in Anaheim. The Tigers haven't won since July 28; they're now 46–74 and 26 games from first place.
- August 18 – Tal Smith, the new general manager of the 47–80 Houston Astros, releases manager Preston Gómez and replaces him with Bill Virdon, fired by the New York Yankees only 17 days earlier. Virdon will helm the Astros for all or part of eight seasons and pilot them to the first two postseason berths in the club's relatively brief history in 1980 and 1981. Gómez, meanwhile, leaves Houston with a 128–161 (.443) won–lost mark.
- August 21 – Pitching brothers Rick Reuschel and Paul Reuschel combine to hurl the Chicago Cubs to a 7–0 victory over the Dodgers — the first time brothers have collaborated on a shutout. Paul takes over when Rick is forced to leave in the 7th inning because of a blister on his finger.
- August 24 – In the second game of a doubleheader at Candlestick Park, Ed Halicki of the Giants no-hits the New York Mets 6–0.
- August 25 – A group of Japanese businessmen are reported to be nearing the purchase of the financially struggling San Francisco Giants, entering the final months of Horace Stoneham's 39-year-long ownership tenure. While today's transaction never materializes, the Giants will endure over six months of turmoil that threatens their future in the Bay Area, with rampant speculation about potential moves to Toronto and even the New Jersey Meadowlands.
- August 29 – Clyde King's 198-game tenure as manager of the Atlanta Braves ends when he is replaced by interim skipper Connie Ryan for the remainder of 1975. King compiled a record of 96–101–1 (.485) over parts of two seasons. After Ryan finishes the season, the Braves hire former Cincinnati Reds pilot Dave Bristol as their 1976 manager on October 10, 1975.

=== September ===
- September 1:
  - As the season's final month begins, three divisional races remain contested. The only exception, in the National League West, sees the Cincinnati Reds (90–45) 18½ games in front of the runner-up Los Angeles Dodgers. Meanwhile, in the National League East, the Pittsburgh Pirates (75–58) hold a four-game edge over the resurgent Philadelphia Phillies; in the American League East, the Boston Red Sox (79–54) lead the Baltimore Orioles by six lengths; and, in the American League West, the three-time defending World Series champion Oakland Athletics are 7½ games in front of the Kansas City Royals.
  - New York Mets ace Tom Seaver shuts out the Pirates at Shea Stadium 3–0, and reaches 200 strikeouts for an MLB-record eighth consecutive season.
- September 2:
  - The San Francisco Giants' Johnny LeMaster sets a major league record by hitting an inside-the-park home run in his first at bat, during a 7–3 win over the Dodgers. Brian Downing, two years earlier, was the first major league player to hit his first homer inside-the-park, but not in his first at bat.
  - Tony Conigliaro's comeback bid ends when he is released by the Boston Red Sox. Conigliaro went only seven-for-57 (.123) with two home runs in a Boston uniform, last appearing in a game June 12, and also struggled at Triple-A Pawtucket.
- September 3 – On the second-to-last batter faced of his Hall of Fame career, Cardinals great Bob Gibson gives up a grand slam to Pete LaCock of the Chicago Cubs — the only bases-loaded homer of LaCock's career. Chicago wins 11–3 at Busch Memorial Stadium, with Gibson (3–10) the losing pitcher.
- September 5 – Larry Andersen makes his major league debut for the Cleveland Indians. Anderson would go on to a 20-year career as a relief pitcher.

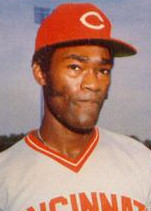
George Foster

- September 7 – The Cincinnati Reds, now 95–47 and holding a 20½-game advantage in the National League West, clinch their division title, one of the earliest (by calendar day) clinching days in MLB history, by defeating the San Francisco Giants, 8–4, at Riverfront Stadium. Outfielder George Foster's four hits and four RBI pace the "Big Red Machine."
- September 8 – Torrential rains wash out the Texas League playoffs with the Lafayette Drillers and Midland Cubs tied at two games each. With the Lafayette field unplayable and its infield a mass of mud, league president Bobby Bragan cancels the deciding game and suggests that the co-champions settle matters with a tug of war.
- September 9 - Chet Lemon of the Chicago White Sox makes his major league debut, pinch hitting for outfielder Nyls Nyman. Facing pitcher Jim Brewer, Lemon hits a fly out in his only plate appearance in Chicago's 5–4 loss to the California Angels.
- September 14 – The Boston Red Sox top the Milwaukee Brewers at Fenway Park, 8–6, as Brewers' 19-year-old shortstop Robin Yount breaks Mel Ott's 47-year-old record by playing in his 242nd game as a teenager.
- September 16 – Rennie Stennett of the Pittsburgh Pirates ties Wilbert Robinson's major league record, set June 10, 1892, by going 7-for-7 in a nine-inning game. He collects two hits each in the first and fifth innings, and scores five of his club's runs in a 22–0 massacre of the Cubs, a major league record for the biggest score in a shutout game in the 20th century. John Candelaria pockets the easy win, while Rick Reuschel is the loser.
- September 18 – Released by the Minnesota Twins in January, Harmon Killebrew returns to Metropolitan Stadium a final time with his new team, the Kansas City Royals. He homers off Eddie Bane in the second inning—the final hit, run and home run of his career.
- September 21 – Vern Ruhle of the Detroit Tigers breaks Jim Rice's left hand with an inside pitch in the second inning of the first-place Boston Red Sox' 6–5 victory at Tiger Stadium. Although Rice tries to stay in the game, he leaves in the seventh inning, and is lost to the Red Sox for the season and postseason. Rice, a future Hall-of-Famer, has formed with Fred Lynn the "Gold Dust Twins" rookie duo that has powered the Red Sox toward the American League East title (.309 BA, 22 home runs, 102 RBI, .841 OPS).
- September 22 – At Three Rivers Stadium, Richie Zisk and "the Cobra," Dave Parker, drive in four runs each to help the Pittsburgh Pirates clinch their fifth National League East title in six seasons with an 11–3 victory over the Philadelphia Phillies.
- September 24:
  - In a scoreless game against the Chicago Cubs at Wrigley Field, Tom Seaver of the New York Mets has a no-hitter broken up with two out in the ninth on a Joe Wallis single. It's the third time Seaver has had a no-hitter foiled in the ninth, including a perfect game bid in 1969, also against the Cubs. Chicago wins the game in the 11th inning 1–0 when Rick Monday scores on Bill Madlock's bases-loaded walk.
  - The Oakland Athletics clinch the American League West title for the fifth consecutive year, defeating the Chicago White Sox 13–2. Reggie Jackson belts two homers, his 33rd and 34th of the season, and Vida Blue wins his 21st game.
  - The red-hot Baltimore Orioles win their 15th game in their last 18, besting the visiting Detroit Tigers 8–1 behind Jim Palmer's 22nd victory. By winning, the Orioles (89–66) creep within 3½ games of division-leading Boston (93–63).
- September 26 – New York Mets rookie Mike Vail strikes out seven times in a doubleheader against the Philadelphia Phillies, setting a National League record that still stands.
- September 27:
  - The New York Yankees sweep a Shea Stadium doubleheader from the Orioles, 3–2 (ten innings) and 7–3, giving the 95–64 Boston Red Sox the American League East title on the penultimate day of the regular season. In the opener, Catfish Hunter wins his 23rd and throws his 30th complete game of 1975. The Yankees' Bobby Bonds homers in each game, his 31st and 32nd of the season.
  - The Milwaukee Brewers fire manager Del Crandall after a disastrous 90-day stretch that sees them go 28–60 from July through September. Crandall's managerial term, which began May 30, 1972, produces a 271–338 (.445) record. After coach Harvey Kuenn handles the Brewers on closing day, the Brewers hire Cincinnati Reds third-base coach Alex Grammas as their 1976 skipper on November 7, 1975.
- September 28 – For the first time in major league history, four pitchers share in a no-hitter, as the Oakland Athletics shut down the California Angels, 5–0, on the final day of the season. Vida Blue, Glenn Abbott, Paul Lindblad and Rollie Fingers are the unique quartet.

=== October ===
- October 1:
  - The Montreal Expos fire the only manager they have had since entering the National League in 1969: Gene Mauch, 49, who posted a 499–627 (.443) record over seven full seasons. He will be replaced by the Expos' Triple-A manager, Karl Kuehl, for 1976.
  - John Holland, wrapping up his 19th season as general manager of the Chicago Cubs, retires at age 65 and is succeeded by longtime Cubs administrator Salty Saltwell, 51.
- October 7 – The Boston Red Sox and Cincinnati Reds win their respective league championship series in three-game sweeps and by identical 5–3 scores—and make a date for what will be a scintillating World Series.
  - In Oakland, the Red Sox dethrone the three-time world champion Athletics behind starting pitcher Rick Wise and brilliant defense by 36-year-old left fielder Carl Yastrzemski. Boston wins its first AL pennant since 1967.
  - It takes ten innings in Pittsburgh, but the "Big Red Machine" continues its demolition of the Senior Circuit, scoring two runs in the top of the tenth to sweep away the Pirates to return to the Fall Classic for the first time since 1972. In winning, Cincinnati overcomes a brilliant performance by Pirates' rookie southpaw John Candelaria, 21, who strikes out 14 in 72/3 innings.
- October 18 – Alvin Dark, manager of the American League West champion Oakland Athletics, is fired by owner Charles O. Finley after the devoutly religious Dark calls Finley a "sinner" at a Pentecostal church gathering near Oakland. It is the second time in eight years that Finley has fired Dark, having previously done so on August 22, 1967.
- October 20 – Willie Davis is on the move again. The veteran center fielder is traded from the St. Louis Cardinals to the San Diego Padres for outfielder Dick Sharon. It is Davis' fourth change of address in less than two years.

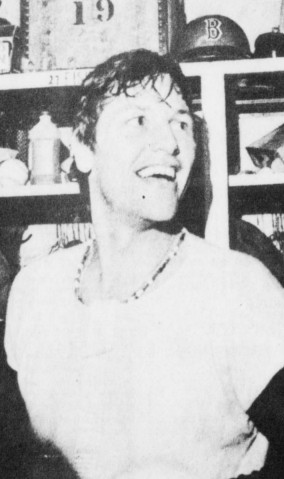
Carlton Fisk after his Game 6 blast

- October 21 – Delayed a day by rain, Game 6 of the World Series will be among the most memorable. Bernie Carbo of the Red Sox hits a three-run, pinch-hit home run in the bottom of the eighth to tie the game. Boston loads the bases with no outs in the ninth but cannot score until Carlton Fisk leads off the twelfth with his memorable walk-off home run, which deflects off the left field foul pole for a 7–6 victory to tie the series.
- October 22 – At Fenway Park, the Cincinnati Reds win Game 7 of the World Series over the Boston Red Sox, 4–3. Cincinnati has come from behind in all four of their victories. Pete Rose is named the World Series MVP. The Reds win their third Fall Classic, and their first since 1940.
- October 24 – The rebuilding Houston Astros acquire 22-year-old pitching prospect Joaquín Andújar from the world-champion Reds for two "players to be named later", minor-leaguers Carlos Alfonso and Luis Sánchez. Andújar will begin his colorful, 13-year MLB career in 1976 by winning a spot in Houston's starting rotation.
- October 28 – Don Kessinger, six-time All-Star shortstop of the Chicago Cubs, is traded to the rival St. Louis Cardinals for pitcher Mike Garman and a minor-league "PTBNL."
- October 30 – John Montefusco, the San Francisco Giants' right-hander, wins the 1975 National League Rookie of the Year Award. Fred Lynn, the Boston Red Sox center-fielder, had won American League rookie honors two days before.

=== November ===
- November 3 – One of baseball's most successful organizations undergoes a major management change when executive vice president Frank Cashen departs the Baltimore Orioles to return to club owner Jerry Hoffberger's Carling National Brewery. Cashen has functioned as the Orioles' top administrator since November 1965 and added general manager responsibilities to his portfolio in November 1971 when Harry Dalton left for the California Angels. Over that decade, Baltimore won four American League pennants, two World Series (1966 and 1970), and five overall American League East titles. He's replaced by longtime executive Hank Peters, most recently the president of Minor League Baseball.
- November 10 – The Kansas City Royals release slugger Harmon Killebrew, ending a 22-year career marked by 573 home runs, good for fifth place on the all-time list.
- November 12 – Tom Seaver of the New York Mets wins his third Cy Young Award, after led the National League pitchers with 22 victories and 243 strikeouts while posting a 2.38 ERA. Seaver had previously won the award in 1969 and 1973.
- November 17:
  - The Los Angeles Dodgers and Atlanta Braves pull off a block-buster, four for two trade. The Dodgers acquire outfielder Dusty Baker and infielder Ed Goodson from the Braves for second baseman Lee Lacy, third baseman Jerry Royster, and outfielders Jimmy Wynn and Tom Paciorek. Wynn, 33, is a three-time All-Star on the downside of his 15-year career. Future MLB manager Baker, 26, will be a 3x All-Star and 2x Silver Slugger Award winner and key player on three pennant-winning Dodger teams through 1983, including their 1981 World Series champions.
  - The American League champion Boston Red Sox strengthen their starting pitching staff by obtaining future Hall-of-Famer Ferguson Jenkins from the Texas Rangers for pitchers Steve Barr and Craig Skok ("PTBNL") and outfielder Juan Beníquez. A seven-time 20-game-winner and 3x All-Star, and the recipient of the 1971 National League Cy Young Award, Jenkins, 32, went 17–18 for the 1975 Rangers.

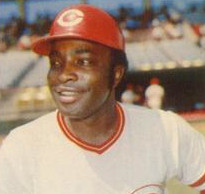
National League MVP Joe Morgan

- November 19 – Joe Morgan of the Cincinnati Reds, who led his team to its first World Series title in 35 years, is named the National League's Most Valuable Player, winning 21 of 23 first-place votes. (The other two go to teammate Pete Rose.)
- November 20 – The financially struggling San Francisco Giants, who finished third in the National League West and drew only 522,919 fans to Candlestick Park in 1975 (worst in MLB), fire manager Wes Westrum. They will not name a replacement until March 3, 1976, after the team has been sold by Horace Stoneham to Bob Lurie and Arthur "Bud" Herseth, when they coax former Giant skipper Bill Rigney out of retirement.
- November 22 – The Cleveland Indians trade outfielder Oscar Gamble to the New York Yankees in exchange for pitcher Pat Dobson.
- November 25 – The Minnesota Twins hire veteran former National League skipper Gene Mauch as their manager for 1976. He fills a vacancy created on September 29 when Frank Quilici was dismissed following 3½ years at the Twins' helm, a term which produced a 280–287 (.494) mark since July 7, 1972.
- November 26 – Boston Red Sox center fielder Fred Lynn becomes the first rookie ever to be named American League MVP. Lynn, who hit .331 with 21 home runs and 105 RBI, also posted league-leading figures in runs (103), doubles (47), and slugging (.566), helping Boston to the American League East title. He also won Rookie of the Year honors.

=== December ===
- December 4 – Ted Turner, 37, at this point the owner of a regional UHF TV station and outdoor billboard advertising business, enters a tentative purchase agreement to buy the Atlanta Braves from William Bartholomay. Reports estimate the sale price to be between $10 million and $12 million, with Turner intending to use Braves' telecasts as programming content for WTCG-TV, Channel 17, his Atlanta outlet soon to become "Superstation WTBS."
- December 6 – The Houston Astros trade pitchers Jim Crawford and Dave Roberts and catcher Milt May to the Detroit Tigers for pitchers Mark Lemongello and Gene Pentz, catcher Terry Humphrey, and outfielder Leon Roberts.
- December 8 – The San Francisco Giants trade left-hander Pete Falcone to the St. Louis Cardinals for former Gold Glove third baseman Ken Reitz. The trade is made by the Giants' acting general manager, Spec Richardson, hired by the National League to oversee the team's operation while it's being sold. In September, the Senior Circuit had advanced $500,000 to embattled longtime owner Horace Stoneham to keep the Giants afloat. Richardson was the GM of the Houston Astros for 8½ years until his ouster in July 1975.
- December 9 – The Philadelphia Phillies trade outfielder Mike Anderson to the St. Louis Cardinals for veteran right-hander Ron Reed. Longtime starting pitcher Reed becomes a valuable member of the Phillies' bullpen over the next eight seasons, when the Phillies win five National League East titles, two pennants, and the 1980 World Series—first in franchise history.
- December 10
  - A deal to move the Chicago White Sox to Seattle, and the Oakland Athletics to Chicago's South Side, is nixed when Bill Veeck repurchases the White Sox (which he previously owned between March 1959 and June 1961) and keeps them in Chicago. Veeck's group pays a reported $9.75 million to John Allyn for 80 percent of the White Sox. In 1976, Seattle will be awarded with an expansion franchise, called the Mariners. Showman Veeck sets up a table in the lobby of the principal hotel for baseball's Winter Meetings and posts a sign reading "Open for Business."
  - Veeck's White Sox and the Philadelphia Phillies immediately get down to business, with Chicago trading future Hall of Fame southpaw and reigning, 14-time American League Gold Glove Award winner Jim Kaat, 37, and shortstop Mike Buskey to the Phillies for pitchers Dick Ruthven and Roy Thomas and shortstop Alan Bannister.
  - The California Angels deal pitcher Bill Singer to the Texas Rangers for first baseman Jim Spencer and $100,000.
  - Former major league catcher and manager Bobby Bragan becomes president of Minor League Baseball (formally the "National Association of Professional Baseball Leagues"). Most recently president of the Double-A Texas League, Bragan, 58, succeeds Hank Peters, the new general manager of the Baltimore Orioles.
- December 11:
  - In one of two franchise-altering trades they make today at the Winter Meetings, the New York Yankees send starting pitcher Doc Medich to the Pittsburgh Pirates for pitchers Ken Brett and Dock Ellis and rookie second baseman Willie Randolph, a future six-time All-Star.
  - In the second, the Yankees trade 3x All-Star and 2x Gold-Glove-winning outfielder Bobby Bonds to the California Angels for pitcher Ed Figueroa and outfielder Mickey Rivers. Right-hander Figueroa will go 55–30 over the next three seasons, which see the Bombers win three AL pennants and the 1977 and 1978 World Series. The speedy Rivers will take over as the Yankees' centerfielder, bat over .300 twice, and steal 90 bases over the same span.
  - Bill Veeck and his general manager, Roland Hemond, strike again, sending two veterans, pitcher Steve Dunning and third baseman Bill Melton, from the Chicago White Sox to the Angels for first baseman Jim Spencer (acquired the previous day) and outfielder Morris Nettles.
  - The San Diego Padres obtain veteran third baseman Doug Rader from the Houston Astros for pitchers Larry Hardy and Joe McIntosh. Rader is a five-time winner of the National League's Gold Glove Award.

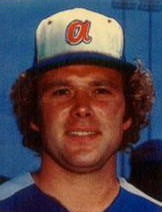
Messersmith and McNally (below)

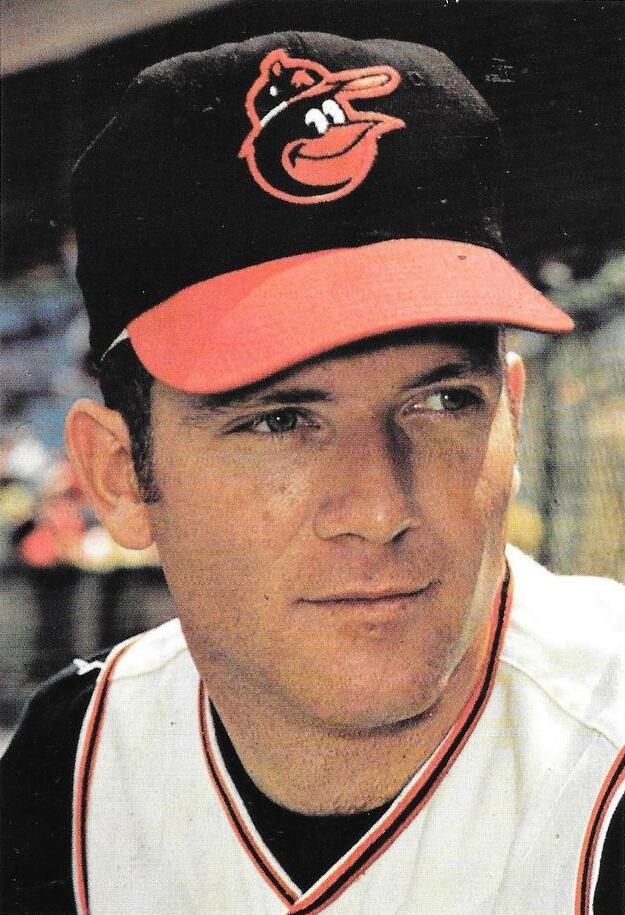

- December 12 – Ten more significant trades are made today, involving 13 of MLB's 24 teams and 27 players. They include these:
  - The Houston Astros trade veteran second baseman Tommy Helms to the Pittsburgh Pirates for a "PTBNL" who turns out to be infielder Art Howe, a key piece on Houston's postseason appearances in 1980 and 1981.
  - The Cincinnati Reds make three trades, subtracting pitchers Clay Carroll and Clay Kirby and infielder Darrel Chaney, and adding hurler Rich Hinton (from the White Sox), first baseman Bob Bailey (Expos), and outfielder Mike Lum (Braves).
  - The Atlanta Braves also make a five-player trade with the Chicago White Sox, trading infielder Larvell Blanks and outfielder Ralph "Roadrunner" Garr to the White Sox for pitchers Ozzie Osborn and Dick Ruthven and outfielder Ken Henderson.
  - The New York Mets trade pitcher Bill Laxton and outfielder Rusty Staub to the Detroit Tigers for veteran southpaw Mickey Lolich and outfielder Billy Baldwin. Staub, 31, is a five-time NL All-Star who will flourish as Detroit's designated hitter. Lolich, 35, has gone 207–175 in 508 games over 13 years for the Tigers, and was the MVP of the 1968 World Series. He will appear in only 31 games for the 1976 Mets.
- December 17:
  - New White Sox owner Bill Veeck fires manager Chuck Tanner, who has three years remaining on his contract. Tanner has skippered the club since September 18, 1970 and compiled a 401–414 (.492) record. Veeck immediately lures 67-year-old Paul Richards out of retirement to pilot the 1976 Pale Hose. Richards last managed in the majors in 1961 before becoming a full-time executive, but began his MLB managing career with a highly successful 1951–1954 tenure at the White Sox's helm.
  - Chuck Tanner is immediately hired by Oakland Athletics owner Charles O. Finley to succeed Alvin Dark as manager of the defending American League West champions.
  - Pete Rose of the Cincinnati Reds is named Sports Illustrated's "Sportsman of the Year".
- December 23 – Arbitrator Peter Seitz announces a landmark decision in favor of the Players' Association, making pitchers Andy Messersmith and Dave McNally free agents. Seitz is immediately fired by John Gaherin, chairman of the owners' Player Relations Committee. McNally, who retired on June 8, will not return to the majors, finishing with a 184–119 career record.

== Births ==
=== January ===
- January 1 – Fernando Tatís
- January 2 – Jeff Suppan
- January 8 – Geremi González
- January 9:
  - Kiko Calero
  - Ken Cloude
- January 12 – Jorge Velandia
- January 13 – Jason Childers
- January 15 – Edwin Díaz
- January 16 – Lee Gardner
- January 17:
  - Brad Fullmer
  - Scott Mullen
- January 19:
  - Brian Mallette
  - Fernando Seguignol
- January 20 – David Eckstein
- January 27 – Jason Conti
- January 28 – Junior Spivey
- January 29 – Miguel Ojeda

=== February ===
- February 5 – Derrick Gibson
- February 6 – Chad Allen
- February 8 – Tony Mounce
- February 9 – Vladimir Guerrero
- February 10 – Hiroki Kuroda
- February 14 – Dámaso Marte
- February 15 – Rafael Medina
- February 16 – Ángel Peña
- February 18:
  - Ila Borders
  - Chad Moeller
- February 20:
  - Leo Estrella
  - Liván Hernández
  - Donzell McDonald
- February 21 – Brandon Berger
- February 23 – Dave Maurer
- February 26 – Mark DeRosa
- February 28:
  - Juan Moreno
  - Ricky Stone

=== March ===
- March 6 – Edgar Ramos
- March 8 – Jesús Peña
- March 9 – Rob Sasser
- March 12 – Kevin Pickford
- March 15:
  - Vladimir Núñez
  - Dan Perkins
- March 25:
  - Adrián Hernández
  - Miguel Mejia
- March 28:
  - Steve Sparks
  - Julio Zuleta
- March 29:
  - Marcus Jones
  - Danny Kolb
- March 31:
  - Tim Christman
  - Ryan Rupe

=== April ===
- April 2 – Hisanori Takahashi
- April 3 – Koji Uehara
- April 4 – Scott Rolen
- April 5 – Domingo Guzmán
- April 7 – Ronnie Belliard
- April 8:
  - Jeremy Fikac
  - Timo Pérez
- April 9 – Talmadge Nunnari
- April 10 – Mike Lincoln
- April 11 – Todd Dunwoody
- April 16 – Kelly Dransfeldt
- April 19:
  - Brent Billingsley
  - John LeRoy
- April 21:
  - Carlos Castillo
  - Aquilino López
- April 25 – Jacque Jones
- April 27:
  - Chris Carpenter
  - Pedro Feliz
  - Benj Sampson
- April 28 – Jordan Zimmerman
- April 29:
  - Rafael Betancourt
  - Josh Booty

=== May ===
- May 2 – Mark Johnson
- May 3 – Gabe Molina
- May 6 – Jim Chamblee
- May 11 – Francisco Cordero
- May 13:
  - Mickey Callaway
  - Jack Cressend
- May 15:
  - Graham Koonce
  - Steve Woodard
- May 17 – Scott Seabol
- May 19 – Josh Paul
- May 20:
  - Amaury García
  - Luis García
- May 25:
  - Adrian Johnson
  - Randall Simon
- May 26 – Travis Lee
- May 29 – Sean Spencer
- May 31 – Mac Suzuki

=== June ===
- June 2 – Steve Rain
- June 3 – José Molina
- June 5 – Jason Green
- June 6 – David Lamb
- June 8 – Matt Perisho
- June 10 – Freddy García
- June 14 – Peter Munro
- June 16 – José Nieves
- June 17:
  - Mark Brownson
  - Donnie Sadler
- June 18 – Félix Heredia
- June 19 – Willis Roberts
- June 22:
  - Kenshin Kawakami
  - Esteban Yan
- June 25 – Kane Davis
- June 26 – Jason Middlebrook
- June 27 – Daryle Ward
- June 28 – Richard Hidalgo
- June 30 – Mike Judd

=== July ===
- July 3 – Christian Parker
- July 5 – Alberto Castillo
- July 8 – David Moraga
- July 14 – Tim Hudson
- July 18 – Torii Hunter
- July 22 – Scot Shields
- July 24 – Bill Ortega
- July 26 – Kevin Barker
- July 27:
  - Shea Hillenbrand
  - Alex Rodriguez
- July 29 – Seth Greisinger
- July 30:
  - Matt Erickson
  - Oswaldo Mairena
- July 31:
  - Randy Flores
  - Gabe Kapler

=== August ===
- August 2 – Joe Dillon
- August 3 – Roosevelt Brown
- August 4 – Eric Milton
- August 6 – Víctor Zambrano
- August 7:
  - Gerónimo Gil
  - Édgar Rentería
- August 8 – Chad Meyers
- August 9:
  - Brian Fuentes
  - Mike Lamb
- August 12 – Luis Ordaz
- August 14:
  - Eric Cammack
  - McKay Christensen
  - Scott Stewart
- August 15:
  - Ben Ford
  - Aaron Scheffer
- August 16:
  - Michael Coleman
  - Cho Jin-ho
- August 19 – Juan Sosa
- August 26:
  - Morgan Ensberg
  - Troy Mattes
- August 27 – Trent Durrington
- August 29 – John Riedling
- August 30 – Bucky Jacobsen

=== September ===
- September 5:
  - Rod Barajas
  - Randy Choate
- September 6 – Derrek Lee
- September 12:
  - Luis Castillo
  - Mark Johnson
- September 14 – George Lombard
- September 15:
  - Javier Cardona
  - Dan Smith
- September 17 – Ryan Jensen
- September 18 – Randy Williams
- September 19 – Javier Valentín
- September 20 – Yovanny Lara
- September 21 – Doug Davis
- September 22:
  - Luis García
  - Danny Klassen
- September 23 – Dave Elder
- September 24 – Mario Encarnación
- September 30 – Carlos Guillén

=== October ===
- October 1 – Brandon Knight
- October 3:
  - Scott Cassidy
  - Mike Thompson
- October 5 – Brandon Puffer
- October 6 – Jeff Farnsworth
- October 7 – Justin Brunette
- October 8 – Andy Thompson
- October 9:
  - Danny Mota
  - J. J. Trujillo
- October 10 – Plácido Polanco
- October 17 – Héctor Almonte
- October 18 – Alex Cora
- October 19 – Horacio Estrada
- October 21 – Toby Hall
- October 23:
  - Todd Belitz
  - Kazuo Matsui
  - Todd Sears
- October 26 – Ryan Bradley
- October 29:
  - Karim García
  - Gary Johnson
  - Scott Randall
- October 30:
  - Andy Dominique
  - Marco Scutaro

=== November ===
- November 2 – Paul Rigdon
- November 10 – Edison Reynoso
- November 16 – Julio Lugo
- November 18:
  - Shawn Camp
  - David Ortiz
  - Matt Wise
- November 19 – Clay Condrey
- November 20 – J. D. Drew
- November 21 – Brian Meadows
- November 23 – Colin Porter

=== December ===
- December 2 – Mark Kotsay
- December 4 – Ed Yarnall
- December 8 – Brian Barkley
- December 10 – Joe Mays
- December 11 – Nate Field
- December 12 – Carlos Hernández
- December 13 – Matt LeCroy
- December 14 – Rodrigo López
- December 15 – Edgard Clemente
- December 17 – Brandon Villafuerte
- December 19 – Russell Branyan
- December 25 – Hideki Okajima
- December 26 – Yoshinori Tateyama
- December 27 – Jeff D'Amico
- December 28 – B. J. Ryan
- December 29:
  - Tom Jacquez
  - Jason Pearson
  - Jaret Wright
- December 30 – Santiago Pérez
- December 31 – Sam McConnell

== Deaths ==
=== January ===
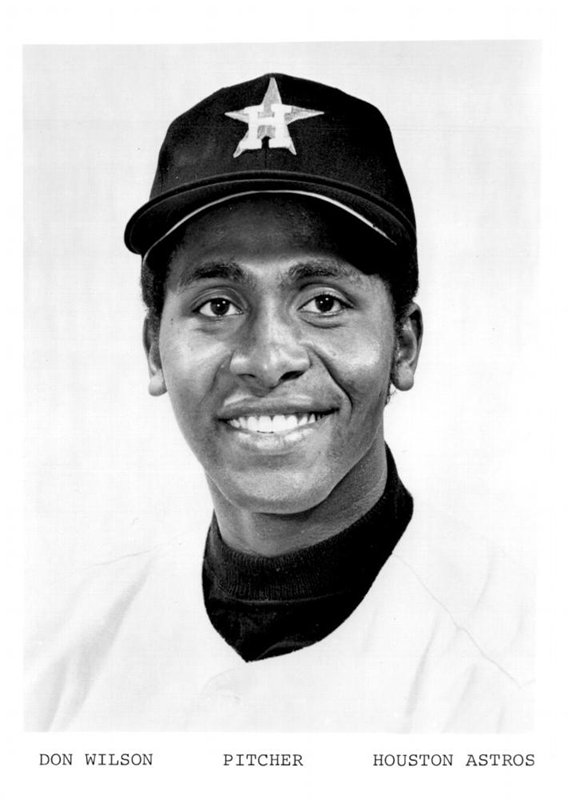
Don Wilson

- January 2 – Jim Poole, 79, first baseman in 283 games for 1925–1927 Philadelphia Athletics; active in Organized Baseball as a player or player-manager for 28 years between 1914 and 1946.
- January 5 – Don Wilson, 29, Houston Astros' starting pitcher who had won 104 games for them since breaking into the majors September 29, 1966, and thrown two no-hitters (on June 18, 1967 against Atlanta, and May 1, 1969 against Cincinnati); National League All-Star (1971); in 1974, he was still in the prime of his career, winning 11 games and posting a 3.08 ERA in 2042/3 innings pitched.
- January 9:
  - Walton Cruise, 84, outfielder who played in 736 career games for the St. Louis Cardinals (1914 and 1916–1919) and Boston Braves (1919–1924).
  - Curt Fullerton, 76, pitcher in 115 games for the Boston Red Sox (1921–1925 and 1933).
- January 12 – Frank Kalin, 57, outfielder/pinch hitter who made brief appearances with the 1940 Pittsburgh Pirates and the 1943 Chicago White Sox; went hitless in nine at bats over seven MLB games.
- January 17 – Jim Canada, 63, first baseman for Birmingham, Jacksonville, Atlanta and Memphis of the Negro American League between 1937 and 1943.
- January 21 – Pat Tobin, 58, pitcher who worked only one game (and one inning) in the majors, on August 21, 1941, as member of the Philadelphia Athletics.
- January 23 – Clarence "Heinie" Mueller, 75, outfielder and first baseman who appeared in 693 career games over 11 years between 1920 and 1935 for the St. Louis Cardinals, New York Giants, Boston Braves and St. Louis Browns.
- January 24:
  - Bobby Anderson, 75, second baseman/shortstop who appeared in 26 games for the 1920 Chicago Giants of the Negro National League.
  - Doc Dudley, 81, first baseman for the St. Louis Giants/Stars of the Negro National League from 1920 to 1923.
- January 26 – Astyanax Douglass, 77, catcher who played 11 games for the Cincinnati Reds over two seasons (1921 and 1925).
- January 29 – Steve White, 90, right-hander who pitched briefly for the 1912 Washington Senators (one game) and Boston Braves (four games).

=== February ===
- February 5 – Ad "Doc" Swigler, 79, graduate of the University of Pennsylvania dental school who threw six innings for the New York Giants in his only MLB game on September 25, 1917.
- February 12 – Dutch Mele, 60, minor-league slugger who had a six-game "cup of coffee" with the 1937 Cincinnati Reds.
- February 17 – George Twombly, 82, outfielder who appeared in 150 total games in five seasons spanning 1914 to 1919 for the Reds, Boston Braves and Washington Senators.
- February 21 – Steve Filipowicz, 55, outfielder who played in 57 total games for the MLB New York Giants and Cincinnati Reds between 1944 and 1948; previously a running back with the NFL New York Giants in 1943.
- February 27 – Otis Henry, 71, third baseman/outfielder who played in the Negro leagues with Memphis and Indianapolis between 1932 and 1937.

=== March ===
- March 2 – Scat Metha, 61, infielder and pinch-runner who appeared in 26 games between April 22 and August 10 for the pennant-bound 1940 Detroit Tigers.
- March 7 – Joe Benes, 74, infielder who played in ten games during May and June for 1931 St. Louis Cardinals.
- March 10:
  - Clint Evans, 85, coach at the University of California from 1930 to 1954 who led team to the first College World Series title in 1947.
  - Johnny Markham, 66, a Negro league pitcher for the Kansas City Monarchs and Birmingham Black Barons.
- March 11 – Lefty Clarke, 79, pitcher whose only MLB appearance came on October 2, 1921, with the Cincinnati Reds; he allowed seven hits and seven runs (only one earned) to the Chicago Cubs in five full innings, and absorbed the loss, but was credited with a complete game when the game was called off because of darkness after it had become "official."
- March 12 – Dick Lanahan, 63, southpaw pitcher who appeared in 56 career games for the Washington Senators (1935, 1937) and Pittsburgh Pirates (1940–1941).
- March 13 – Red Marion, 60, outfielder in 18 games for the 1935 and 1943 Washington Senators, then a longtime minor-league manager; brother of Marty Marion.
- March 14 – Tracy Baker, 83, University of Washington graduate who appeared in one MLB game on June 19, 1911 as a member of the Boston Red Sox and went hitless in one at bat.
- March 17 – Diamond Pipkins, 67, left-hander who pitched for the Birmingham Black Barons and Cleveland Cubs between 1929 and 1942; led 1942 Negro American League hurlers in games won.
- March 18 – Whitey Ock, 63, catcher who played in one game for the Brooklyn Dodgers on September 29, 1935 and went hitless in three at bats.
- March 21 – Joe Medwick, 63, nicknamed "Ducky" and "Ducky-Wucky," Hall of Fame left fielder and 10-time All-Star who in 1937 became the most recent National League player to win the Triple Crown, also winning the MVP; lifetime .324 hitter, who had six 100-RBI seasons for the St. Louis Cardinals; also played for Brooklyn Dodgers, New York Giants and Boston Braves during a 17-year (1932–1948) MLB career.
- March 25 – Tommy Holmes, 71, sportswriter who covered the Brooklyn Dodgers from 1924 until the team's move to Los Angeles in 1958.
- March 26 – Harley Young, 91, pitcher in 14 total games for the Pittsburgh Pirates and Boston Doves of the National League in 1908.
- March 27 – Oscar Fuhr, 81, pitched in 63 contests for the Chicago Cubs and Boston Red Sox between 1921 and 1925.
- March 28 – Hy Gunning, 86, first baseman who played four games for the 1911 Boston Red Sox.

=== April ===
- April 3 – Merritt "Sugar" Cain, 67, pitcher for the Philadelphia Athletics (1932–1935), St. Louis Browns (1935–1936) and Chicago White Sox (1936–1938) who appeared in 178 career MLB games.
- April 8 – Jim Peterson, 66, pitcher who hurled in 41 MLB games for the Philadelphia Athletics and Brooklyn Dodgers between 1931 and 1937.
- April 11 – Fay Washington, 60, pitcher for St. Louis–New Orleans, Birmingham and Cincinnati–Indianapolis of the Negro American League between 1940 and 1945.
- April 16 – Frank Wayenberg, 76, pitched in two games for the 1924 Cleveland Indians.
- April 18 – Jack Burns, 67, first baseman for the St. Louis Browns and Detroit Tigers, 1930 to 1936, appearing in 890 games; later a coach and scout for the Boston Red Sox.
- April 19 – Wes Kingdon, 74, infielder who played 20 years in the minor leagues and batted .324 in 18 games in his only MLB trial with the 1932 Washington Senators.
- April 25 – Bruce Edwards, 51, catcher for the Brooklyn Dodgers (1946–1951), Chicago Cubs (1951–1952, 1954), Washington Senators (1955) and Cincinnati Redlegs (1956); two-time National League All-Star.

=== May ===
- May 6 – Les Burke, 72, second baseman for the Detroit Tigers from 1923 to 1926.
- May 10 – Harold Kaese, 66, sportswriter for the Boston Transcript and The Boston Globe from 1933 to 1973.
- May 15 – Johnny Gooch, 77, catcher who played in 11 MLB seasons for the Pittsburgh Pirates (1921–1928), Brooklyn Robins (1928–1929), Cincinnati Reds (1929–1930) and Boston Red Sox (1933); member of 1925 World Series champions.
- May 16 – Al Helfer, 63, play-by-play announcer for the Pittsburgh Pirates, Cincinnati Reds, Brooklyn Dodgers, New York Giants, New York Yankees, Philadelphia Phillies, Houston Colt .45s, Oakland Athletics, and Mutual's "Game of the Day" during a sportscasting career that stretched from 1933 to 1970.
- May 17 – Sig Broskie, 64, catcher in 11 games for 1940 Boston Bees.
- May 22 – Lefty Grove, 75, Hall of Fame pitcher for the Philadelphia Athletics and Boston Red Sox who became the second left-hander to win 300 games, leading AL in ERA nine times and in winning percentage five times, both records; won the pitching triple crown twice, also winning MVP in 1931 after 31–4 campaign; also led AL in strikeouts seven consecutive years.
- May 25 – Bruce Hartford, 83, shortstop in eight games for the 1914 Cleveland Naps.
- May 30 – Bert Cole, 78, left-handed pitcher who worked in 177 career games for the Detroit Tigers (1921–1925), Cleveland Indians (1925) and Chicago White Sox (1927).

=== June ===
- June 2 – Spoke Emery, 78, outfielder in five games for 1925 Philadelphia Phillies; collected two hits in his three MLB at bats (.667).
- June 9 – Ownie Carroll, 72, pitcher for the Detroit Tigers, New York Yankees, Cincinnati Reds and Brooklyn Dodgers between 1925 and 1934, who later coached at Seton Hall University for 25 years.
- June 16 – Clint Courtney, 48, catcher for five American League teams between 1951 and 1961 and the first major leaguer at his position to wear eyeglasses; manager of Triple-A Richmond Braves at the time of his death.
- June 17 – Sid Gordon, 57, All-Star left fielder and third baseman, primarily for the New York Giants (1941–1943, 1946–1949 and 1955) and Boston/Milwaukee Braves (1950–1953), who had five 20-HR seasons.
- June 23 – Marty Callaghan, 75, outfielder who appeared in 295 career games for the Chicago Cubs (1922–1923) and Cincinnati Reds (1926 and 1928).
- June 28 – Audrey Bleiler, 42, infielder for two All-American Girls Professional Baseball League champion teams.

=== July ===
- July 5 – Joe Kiefer, 75, pitcher in 15 games for the Chicago White Sox (1920) and Boston Red Sox (1925–1926).
- July 18 – Ted Wingfield, 75, pitcher who played in 113 games from 1923 to 1927 for the Washington Senators and Boston Red Sox.
- July 23 – Art Mills, 72, pitcher in 19 games for the 1927–1928 Boston Braves; coach for the Detroit Tigers from 1944 to 1948, including service on 1945 World Series champion.
- July 27 – Fred Sherry, 86, pitcher who went 0–4 (4.30 ERA) in ten games for the 1911 Washington Senators.
- July 31 – Max Flack, 85, right fielder for the Chicago Whales of the Federal League (1914–1915), Chicago Cubs (1916–1922) and St. Louis Cardinals (1922–1925) who batted over .300 three times.

=== August ===
- August 5 – Bill Morrell, 82, pitcher for the 1926 Washington Senators and 1930–1931 New York Giants who worked in 48 career games.
- August 11 – Rollin Cook, 84, pitcher who appeared in five contests for the 1915 St. Louis Browns.
- August 12 – Lew Riggs, 65, third baseman for St. Louis Cardinals (1934), Cincinnati Reds (1935–1940) and Brooklyn Dodgers (1941–1942 and 1946); 1936 National League All-Star and member of 1940 World Series champions.
- August 20:
  - Daniel Canónico, 59, pitcher who led the Venezuelan team to the 1941 Amateur World Series title, winning five of the team's games including the series-tying and deciding games against Cuba.
  - Jake Miller, 77, pitched in an even 200 games over nine seasons in the American League, eight of them for the Cleveland Indians (1924–1931).
- August 26 – Eddie Snead, 65, pitcher who won three of four decisions for the 1940 Birmingham Black Barons of the Negro American League.

=== September ===
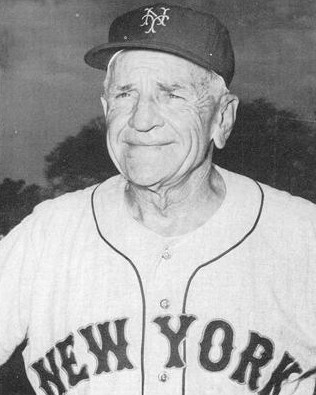
Casey Stengel

- September 3 – Irv Medlinger, 48, left-handed relief pitcher who got into nine games for the 1949 and 1951 St. Louis Browns.
- September 9 – Ken Jungels, 59, relief pitcher who appeared in 25 total games over five seasons between 1937 and 1942 for the Cleveland Indians and Pittsburgh Pirates.
- September 10 – Lance Richbourg, 77, right fielder who played 629 of his 698 MLB games for the Boston Braves (1927–1931); batted .308 lifetime.
- September 12 – Augie Johns, 76, southpaw who pitched in 36 games for the 1926–1927 Detroit Tigers.
- September 28 – Moose Solters, 69, left fielder with four AL teams between 1934 and 1943 who batted .300 and drove in over 100 runs three times, before his eyesight gradually failed after he was hit with a ball during a 1941 warmup.
- September 29 – Casey Stengel, 85, Hall of Fame manager who won a record ten pennants (tied with John McGraw) in 12 seasons leading the Yankees (1949–1960), capturing seven World Series titles (tied with Joe McCarthy); also managed Dodgers, Braves and Mets, applying his trademark humor to the Mets in their woeful first season; in 25 years as an MLB manager, posted a record of 1,899–1,835 (.509); in his playing days, an outfielder for five NL clubs from 1912 to 1925; batted .393 in 28 World Series at bats (1916, 1922, 1923), hitting two game-winning home runs for the New York Giants (against the Yankees) in the 1923 Fall Classic.

=== October ===
- October 1 – Larry MacPhail, 85, Hall of Fame executive who introduced night games, plane travel and pensions to the major leagues while running the Cincinnati Reds (1933–1936), Brooklyn Dodgers (1938–1942) and New York Yankees (1945–1947); won 1941 National League pennant in Brooklyn and 1947 World Series with Yankees, then left baseball; father of Lee, also a Hall of Fame executive, and grandfather of Andy MacPhail, high-level executive for multiple teams between 1986 and 2020.
- October 3 – Elmer Knetzer, 90, pitcher who won 38 games for the Pittsburgh Rebels of the "outlaw" Federal League in 1914–1915; also pitched for Brooklyn, Boston and Cincinnati of the National League from 1909 to 1912 and 1916–1917.
- October 4 – Joan Whitney Payson, 72, founding principal owner of the New York Mets from April 1960 until her death; former stockholder in New York Giants who, in 1957, voted against their transfer to San Francisco.
- October 13 – Swede Risberg, 81, shortstop for the 1917–1920 Chicago White Sox, and member of 1917 world champions and 1919 AL champions; last survivor among the eight players barred from baseball for their involvement in the Black Sox Scandal.
- October 15 – Mickey Grasso, 55, catcher and World War II POW who resumed his baseball career in 1946; played in 322 MLB games for the Washington Senators (1950–1953), Cleveland Indians (1954) and New York Giants (1946 and 1955).
- October 19 – Hod Kibbie, 72, second baseman and shortstop who had an 11-game stint with the 1925 Boston Braves.

=== November ===
- November 8:
  - Les Backman, 87, right-hander who pitched in 47 games for the 1909 and 1910 St. Louis Cardinals.
  - Vern Morgan, 47, third baseman who appeared in 31 games for the 1954–1955 Chicago Cubs; coach for the Minnesota Twins from 1969 until his death.
  - Ray Shepardson, 78, catcher in three games for 1924 St. Louis Cardinals.
- November 14 – Garland Buckeye, 78, southpaw pitcher who appeared in 108 MLB games between 1918 and 1928, 106 of them for the 1925–1928 Cleveland Indians.
- November 25 – Red Sheridan, 79, infielder in five games for the Brooklyn Robins (1918, 1920).
- November 26 – Laymon Yokely, 69, stalwart Negro leagues pitcher between 1926 and 1946, notably for the Baltimore Black Sox; led Eastern Colored League in victories, strikeouts, innings pitched and complete games in 1928; won 17 games in 1929.
- November 27:
  - Eddie Dwight, 70, outfielder/second baseman who played for three Negro leagues teams, notably the Kansas City Monarchs, between 1925 and 1937.
  - Gene Osborn, 53, play-by-play announcer who described games for the Mutual Network "Game of the Day" and the Detroit Tigers, Pittsburgh Pirates, Chicago White Sox and Kansas City Royals between 1959 and 1975.
- November – Claudio Manela, 81, first Filipino to play in major leagues; a left-hander who pitched in 21 games for the 1921 Cuban Stars of the Negro National League.

=== December ===
- December 1:
  - Nellie Fox, 47, Hall of Fame second baseman and 12-time All-Star for the Chicago White Sox (1950–1963) who formed half of a spectacular middle infield with Luis Aparicio; batted .300 six times, led AL in hits four times, and was 1959 MVP; overall played in 19 MLB seasons (1947–1965) with Philadelphia Athletics, White Sox and Houston Astros, and made 2,663 hits.
  - Dave Koslo, 55, left-handed pitcher who won over 90 games for the New York Giants (1941–1942 and 1946–1953), missing 1943–1945 seasons due to wartime service; started and won Game 1 of the 1951 World Series.
- December 8:
  - Fred Blackwell, 84, reserve catcher for the 1917–1919 Pittsburgh Pirates.
  - Johnny Couch, 84, pitcher for Detroit Tigers (1917), Cincinnati Reds (1922–1923) and Philadelphia Phillies (1923–1925) who worked in 147 career games.
- December 9 – Jeff Heath, 60, Canadian-born, two-time All-Star left fielder (1941 and 1943) with the Cleveland Indians (1936–1945); also played with Washington Senators (1946), St. Louis Browns (1946–1947) and Boston Braves (1948–1949); led American League in triples twice (1938, 1941); helped lead Boston to 1948 National League pennant, but broke his ankle late in September and missed 1948 World Series, played against Cleveland; later a broadcaster for Seattle of the Pacific Coast League; posthumously elected to Canadian Baseball Hall of Fame (1988).
- December 12 – Julie Wera, 75, backup third baseman who played in 38 games as a member of the 1927 World Series champion New York Yankees.
- December 13 – Alex Herman, 76, Negro leagues outfielder during the 1920s and 1930s; Tuskegee Institute graduate who became the first African-American elected to office in Alabama since Reconstruction; in 1925, while a player, he recommended that his club sign a young Satchel Paige, kick-starting Paige's long, Hall of Fame career.
- December 15 – Buster Chatham, 73, third baseman-shortstop in 129 games for Boston Braves during 1930 and 1931; longtime scout and minor-league manager.
- December 17 – Kerby Farrell, 62, manager of the 1957 Cleveland Indians; first baseman and left-handed pitcher in 188 games for 1943 Boston Braves and 1945 Chicago White Sox; coach for White Sox and Indians between 1966 and 1971; won three Minor League Manager of the Year awards during his long career as a skipper in minors.
- December 23:
  - Rae Blaemire, 64, catcher in two games for 1941 New York Giants.
  - Jim McGlothlin, 32, pitcher for the California Angels (1965–1969), Cincinnati Reds (1970–1973) and Chicago White Sox (1973); American League All-Star (1967); appeared in 1970 and 1972 World Series.
- December 24 – Russ Lyon, 62, catcher who appeared in seven games with the 1944 Cleveland Indians.
- December 27 – Lou Lowdermilk, 88, left-handed pitcher who played in 20 career games for the 1911–1912 St. Louis Cardinals.
