= Edison (disambiguation) =

Thomas Edison (1847–1931) was an American inventor and businessman.

Edison may also refer to:

- Edison (name), including people with the name

== Places ==
- Edison, California, US
- Edison, Georgia, US
- Edison, Nebraska, US
- Edison, New Jersey, US
- Edison, Ohio, US
- Edison, Washington (state), US
- Edison, West Virginia, US
- Edison Township, Swift County, Minnesota, US
- Edison Park, Chicago, Illinois, US

== Facilities and structures ==
- Edison State Park, the site of Thomas Edison's Menlo Park Laboratory
- Thomas Alva Edison Memorial Tower and Museum, Edison, New Jersey
- Edison (Monterrey Metro), Monterrey, Mexico
- The Edison, a Los Angeles nightclub

=== Education ===
- Edison High School (New Jersey), Edison, New Jersey
- Edison Tech Center, interactive learning center in Schenectady, New York
- Thomas Edison State University, Trenton, New Jersey

== Companies and organizations ==
- Electrical utility, the power company, sometimes called an "Edison"
  - Consolidated Edison, several different Edisons of New York City combined, an electrical utility
  - Commonwealth Edison, an electric company in Illinois
  - Edison S.p.A., an Italian energy company
  - Southern California Edison, an electrical utility serving Southern California
    - Edison International, its parent company
- Edison General Electric, founded by Thomas Edison
- Edison Machine Works, founded by Thomas Edison
- Edison Records, record label company founded by Edison
- Edison Studios, pioneering film company owned by Edison

== Arts, entertainment, media ==
- Edison (book), a 2019 book written by Edmund Morris
- Edison, an audio editing plug-in for FL Studio
- Edison (poem), a 1927 epic poem by Vítězslav Nezval
- Edison Awards (India), Tamil film industry awards
- Edison (film), a 2005 film directed by David J. Burke
- Edison Award, a music award in the Netherlands
- Edison, a later name of the band Edison Lighthouse
- Edison Glass or Edison, a band

== Computing ==
- Edison (programming language)
- Edison (software), a PC energy monitoring application by Verdiem Corporation
- Intel Edison, a tiny dual-core computer offered as a development system

== Transportation and vehicles ==
- USS Edison (DD-439), a United States destroyer
- Edison, a train operated as part of the Clocker service
- Edison, a vehicle-to-grid research project in Denmark
- Edison Motors, an electric truck manufacturer in Canada

== Other uses ==
- Edison Awards, a technological prize in the United States
- Edison (crater), a lunar crater
- Edison device, a blood analysis machine produced by US corporation Theranos.

== See also ==
- Edison Bridge (disambiguation), various locations
