= Eidson =

Eidson may refer to:

== Places ==
- Eidson, Tennessee
- Eidson Road, Texas

== People ==
- Chuck Eidson (born 1980), American basketball player
- Jake Eidson (b. 1995), American-Australian race car driver
- Jim Eidson (born 1949), American football player in the National Football League
- Michael Eidson, founder of CamelBak
- Thomas Eidson (born 1944), American writer

== See also ==
- Edinson
- Edison (disambiguation)
- Edson (disambiguation)
