= Charles Dudley =

Charles Dudley is the name of:

- Charles E. Dudley (1780–1841), American politician
- Charles Benjamin Dudley (1842–1909), American chemist
- Charles Dudley (actor) (1883–1952), American actor and studio make-up artist
- Charles Dudley (basketball) (born 1950), American basketball player
- Doc Dudley (Charles Arthur Dudley Jr., 1894–1975), American baseball player
