= Women En Large =

Book by Laurie Toby Edison

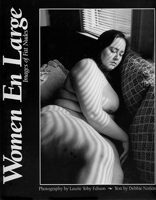
- Author: Laurie Toby Edison
- Language: English
- Genre: Fine art photography
- Publisher: Books in Focus
- Publication date: October 31, 1994
- Publication place: United States
- Media type: Print (Trade Paperback)
- Pages: 116
- ISBN: 1-885495-00-5
- OCLC: 31622252
- Dewey Decimal: 779/.23/092 20
- LC Class: TR675 .E33 1994
- Followed by: Familiar Men: A Book of Nudes

Women En Large: Images of Fat Nudes by Laurie Toby Edison, with text by Debbie Notkin, was published in 1994 by Books in Focus. The book is a fine-art photography book of nudes of fat women. It contains 41 black-and-white photographs and two essays by Notkin, plus an artist's statement by Edison and an assortment of work (poetry, songs, quotations) by the women in the photographs.

Tracy Young, reviewing the book in Allure magazine, said, "Like painter Lucian Freud's monumental nudes of performance artist Leigh Bowery... the nude women in Women En Large have a certain majesty, the unabashedness of Henry Moore sculptures. They have escaped. And they're enough to convince you that clothes, not flesh, are what makes fat people look diminished."

Photographs from Women En Large have been shown in New York, Tokyo, Kyoto, Toronto, Boston, London, St. Petersburg, Beijing, Seoul, Budapest, and San Francisco.
