= Edinson =

Edinson is a masculine given name. Notable people with the name include:

- Edinson Cavani (born 1987), Uruguayan footballer
- Édinson Rentería (born 1968), Colombian baseball player
- Edinson Vólquez (born 1983), Dominican Republic baseball player

== See also ==
- Edison (name)
