= 1975 Senior League World Series =

American youth baseball tournament

Tournament information
- Location: Gary, Indiana
- Dates: August 11–16, 1975

Final positions
- Champions: Pingtung, Taiwan
- Runner-up: Chicago, Illinois

The 1975 Senior League World Series took place from August 11–16 in Gary, Indiana, United States. Pingtung, Taiwan defeated Chicago, Illinois in the championship game. It was Taiwan's fourth straight championship.

== Teams ==
United States	International
(New York (state)) Massapequa, New York East	Thunder Bay, Ontario Canada
(Illinois) Chicago, Illinois; Clear Ridge; North	(West Germany) Wiesbaden, West Germany Europe
(Florida) West Tampa, Florida South	(Taiwan) Pingtung, Taiwan Far East
(California) Fresno, California West	(Puerto Rico) San Juan, Puerto Rico Latin America

== Results ==
Upper round 1	Upper round 2	Upper final	Championship
—	Puerto Rico	3
—	Illinois (F/8)	4
1–0	Illinois	0
1–0	Florida	3
—	Florida	5
—	West Germany	3
2–0	Florida	4
2–0	Taiwan (F/9)	5
—	Canada	0
—	California	2
1–0	California	3
1–0	Taiwan	4
—	(New York (state)) New York	0
—	Taiwan	7	3–0	Taiwan	5	—
4–1	Illinois	0	—
Lower round 1	Lower round 2	Lower round 3	Lower final
1–1	California	9
0–1	Puerto Rico	2	1–1	West Germany	2	2–1	Florida	1
0–1	West Germany	3	2–1	California	3–1	Illinois (F/10)	2
2–1	Illinois
1–1	Illinois	1
0–1	Canada	4	1–1	Canada	0
0–1	(New York (state)) New York	0

1975 Senior League World Series Champions
Pingtung, Taiwan
