= Edison (name) =

Notable people with the name Edison include:

== Surname ==
- Brent Edison (born 1956), American attorney and politician
- Charles Edison (1890–1969), son of Thomas Edison, and Governor of New Jersey
- Dominique Edison (born 1986), American football wide receiver
- Harry Edison (1915–1999), American jazz trumpeter
- Laurie Toby Edison (born 1942), American photographer
- Matthew Edison (born 1975), Canadian actor
- Mike Edison (born 1964), American writer
- Noel Edison (born 1958), Canadian conductor
- Theodore Miller Edison (1898–1992), American inventor, fourth son of Thomas Edison
- Thomas Edison (1847–1931), American inventor
- Tommy Edison (born 1963), blind YouTuber

== Given name ==
- Edison Barrios (born 1988), Venezuelan professional baseball player
- Edison Carter, a character in Max Headroom
- Edison Chen (born 1980), Hong Kong teen idol
- Edison Denisov (1929–1996), Russian composer
- Edison James (born 1943), former prime minister of Dominica
- Édison Méndez (born 1979), Ecuadoran football midfielder
- Edison Reynoso (born 1975), Dominican baseball player
- Edison Liu American chemist
