= Laurie Toby Edison =

American artist

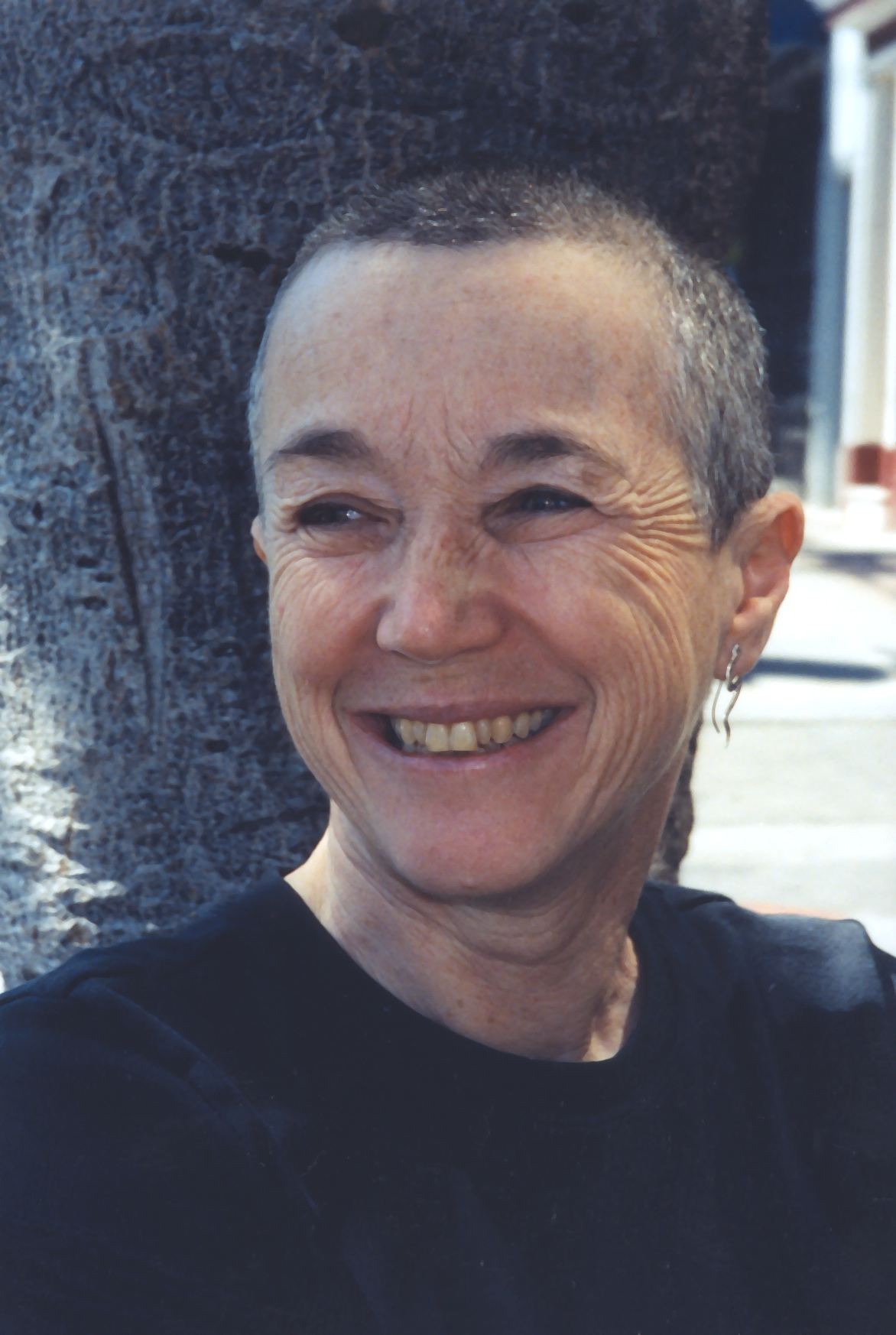
- Laurie Toby Edison
- Born: March 5, 1942; New York City, United States
- Known for: Photography
- Notable work: Women En Large: Images of Fat Nudes (1994); Familiar Men: A Book of Nudes (2004); Women of Japan (2007)

Laurie Toby Edison (born March 5, 1942) is an internationally exhibited American artist, photographer, and visual activist. Much of Edison's photography is black-and-white fine art portraits. Their current project is Pandemic Shadows. Their lifelong commitment to social justice informs all their work. Their work has been exhibited in museums and galleries around the world, including New York City, Tokyo, Kyoto, Toronto, Boston, London, Shanghai, Los Angeles, Beijing, Seoul, Budapest, and San Francisco.

They have published two books of photographs: a suite of nude environmental portraits of fat women (Women En Large), and Familiar Men: A Book of Nudes, nude environmental portraits of a very diverse cross-section of men. Their photo essay of clothed environmental portraits of women in Japan, Women of Japan is accompanied by bilingual essays from many of the models. Women En Large is featured in Female Body Image in Contemporary Art.

They and their writing partner Debbie Notkin have blogged about body image, photography and resistance at Body Impolitic since 2005.

== Early life and work ==
Edison was born in 1942 in New York City in a family of artists and designers. Their early influences include the beat movement, abstract expressionism, and jazz.

Edison attended Wellesley College from 1958-59. A long-time resident of San Francisco, they live in the Mission District. Edison identifies, among other things, as Jewish and queer. They say that their two daughters have been an important influence on their work.

Edison's early art was primarily jewelry and sculpture. They co-owned jewelry stores in Sarasota, Florida and Provincetown, Massachusetts during the 1960s. They began making sculptural jewelry in 1969, and later included mythic, fantasy, and science fiction designs. They became a feminist in the 1970s and moved to San Francisco - an epicenter of feminism - in 1980. In the 1980s, they taught themselves photography as an art form better suited to their social activism. It has become one of their primary arts, though they have never stopped designing and making jewelry and sculpture.

== Photography ==
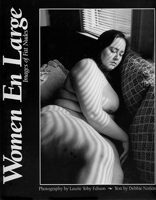
'Women En Large, Edison's first book

Edison practices environmental portraiture, collaborating with their models to find settings which reflect their own sense of themselves. They are frequently in the model’s home or garden, but can also be in natural or other outdoor settings. For instance, Edison's three photographs of Okinawan artist and activist Hanashiro Ikuko show Ikuko at her loom, at a sacred forest site, and in front of a fence around a US military base.

The collaboration also extends to engagement with the communities from which the models come. Edison and Notkin spent ten years working among Fat Acceptance activists before the publication of Women En Large. Women En Large: Images of Fat Nudes was published in 1994, and has sold over 10,000 copies. It contains 42 photographs and two essays by Debbie Notkin. It has been continuously in print for 25 years and is a basic text in feminist imagery classes in the English language.

Women En Large was one of the first endeavors that sought to display woman in a dignified manner that treated the fat body as a form to be celebrated. ... Notkin and Edison opened the door for larger bodies to function as a legitimate subject. -- Emily Newman

Familiar Men: A Book of Nudes was published in 2004. It features 59 photographs, not only portraits, but "extracts" (small and enlarged cropped sections from the photographs) and includes a wide variety of men of many ethnicities, sizes, and abilities, ages 19–92. The keynote essay is by Debbie Notkin and Richard F. Dutcher, and the introduction is by masculinity scholar Michael Kimmel. Familiar Men entailed extensive outreach to different men's groups and individual men, as well as substantial research into masculinity.

Laurie Edison's photographs retrieve the everyday heroism of men who can live inside their actual bodies, who defy impossible notions of masculinity with every breath. In so doing, they confront the norms of masculinity with heroic defiance, saying that men can be so much more than those traditional images. -- Michael Kimmel, Distinguished Professor of Sociology, Stony Brook University

Photographer and commentator Tee Corinne said that Edison’s nude portraiture "is unique in focusing on the nude without eroticizing it."

Women of Japan, a suite of 38 clothed portraits of women in Japan, from many Japanese cultures and backgrounds, was completed in 2007. Women of Japan required an especially deep collaboration with many Japanese feminists, including in gaining societal understanding, finding models, arranging exhibitions, and ensuring proper translations of the models’ written contributions. Professor Hagiwara Hiroko wrote an introduction. Notkin and Edison, with Kobayashi Mika and Rebecca Jennison, wrote an article for the Asia Pacific Journal, “Body Image in the US and Japan,” which discusses outreach in Japan, with references to their experiences with Women En Large and Familiar Men. Photographs from this suite have been exhibited in Japan, China, Korea, and the US. The complete Women of Japan project was shown at the Pacifico Convention Center in Yokohama in the fall of 2007.

The women in these photos are totally free of the stale mysterious images often applied to images of women in Asia. The work appeals to no obvious references about Japan, but still seems to tell something very important she found in this country. Far from exploitation of exotic images, [Laurie’s] work gives you a kind of intimate feeling, though you don't know the people in the pictures personally. I very much like this feeling of intimacy, which I find in her other works.... Yoshioka Hiroshi, Professor of Art Theory, Kyoto University Edison, Laurie Toby. "Women of Japan 3".

A retrospective of one hundred of Edison's photographs “Meditations on the Body: Recent Work” was exhibited at the National Museum of Art in Osaka in 2001. Edison has photographs in the permanent collections of Gallery Fleur, Kyoto Seika University, and the National Museum of Art, Osaka. The National Museum of Art in Osaka included their photographs in their 35th anniversary exhibition, The Allure of the Collection, in 2012. The Tate Gallery in London has purchased Women En Large for its Martin Parr photobook collection.

Edison has been working on "Memory Landscapes: A Visual Memoir" - color iPad images that will create an aesthetic of time and memory. Edison says:

I am re-engaging with the memories of my life, creating an autobiographical visual memoir, expressing the poetics of non-linear time. Memories are filtered, by who we are now, who we were then, and what has happened in between. We view our past through layers of memories, and the past is everything that happened except this moment. Memory Landscapes will eventually be an iPad app that creates an aesthetic of time and memory.

The iPad's technical possibilities allow me to create an aesthetic of memory, reflecting the way that memories in the brain are a series of contingent associations. If you tap an image within the picture, it can link to another image, voice, or text, and these links can continue on. So you can have an aesthetic of memory, associations, connections and layers.

Edison provided an audio quotation on Memory Landscapes for the Travelers Stepping Into the Unknown exhibit at the Nation Museum of Art in Osaka in 2018, curated by Karin Sander.

Pandemic Shadows: During the COVID pandemic, Edison began taking iPhone pictures of shadows during walks, mostly in the Mission District of San Francisco, but also on walks and hikes in other parts of the San Francisco Bay area. They began posting some of these digital photographs on Instagram, as part of a new project, Pandemic Shadows]. Photographs from Pandemic Shadows have appeared in gallery shows in Budapest, Chicago, Barcelona, and Rome. Edison says about Pandemic Shadows:

I’ve been walking & living in the shadow of the pandemic and the lockdown, photographing the Pandemic Shadows that I see everywhere. I started being interested in shadow patterns when I began taking iPhone photos. The pandemic, the isolation, and the walking I’ve been doing, transformed my vision into something far more emotionally involving. It lets me make beauty in hard times.

== Edison's views on their work ==
Edison says:

Just as Women En Large is my statement on the female nude, at least at this time, Familiar Men is my statement on the male nude. The five years I spent photographing men and talking with them have transformed my vision of masculinity in this time and place, as well as how I perceive the body in my work.

I first saw all my nude photographs, men and women together, in Kyoto in November of 2000. I realized that they are a single body of work imbuing the individual nudes with dignity and presence.

Women of Japan, my first group of clothed portraits, had me grappling with all the issues from the previous two suites, from the position of a foreigner, and included the additional complex issues of Japanese identity.

My photography started out as social justice work, but what it gave me was a whole new art form, and a new aesthetic. It perpetually changes my perspective on the universe.
