= Edison Bridge =

Edison Bridge, the name of various bridges named after Thomas Edison, may refer to

- Edison Bridge (Florida)
- Edison Bridge (New Jersey)
- Edison Bridge (Ohio)
