= Otis Henry =

American baseball player

- Third baseman
- Born: April 25, 1903; Daingerfield, Texas, U.S.
- Died: February 27, 1975 (aged 71); Gladewater, Texas, U.S.
- Batted: Right Threw: Right

Negro league baseball debut
- 1931, for the Memphis Red Sox

Last appearance
- 1937, for the Indianapolis Athletics
- Stats at Baseball Reference

Teams
- Memphis Red Sox (1931–1932); Indianapolis Athletics (1937)

James Otis Henry (April 25, 1903 – February 27, 1975), nicknamed "Tex", was an American Negro league third baseman in the 1930s.

A native of Daingerfield, Texas, Henry made his Negro leagues debut in 1931 with the Memphis Red Sox. He played with Memphis again the following season, and also played for the Indianapolis Athletics in 1937. Henry died in Gladewater, Texas in 1975 at age 71.
