= Eddie Snead =

American baseball player

- Pitcher
- Born: July 30, 1910; Fowl River, Alabama, U.S.
- Died: August 26, 1975 (aged 65); Mobile, Alabama, U.S.
- Batted: Right Threw: Left

Negro league baseball debut
- 1940, for the Birmingham Black Barons

Last appearance
- 1940, for the Birmingham Black Barons

Teams
- Birmingham Black Barons (1940)

Eddie Richard Snead (July 30, 1910 – August 26, 1975) was an American Negro league pitcher in the 1940s.

A native of Fowl River, Alabama, Snead played for the Birmingham Black Barons in 1940. In eight recorded games on the mound, he posted a 3.83 ERA over 40 innings. Snead died in Mobile, Alabama in 1975 at age 65.
