= Doc Dudley =

American baseball player

- Outfielder
- Born: January 10, 1894; Waskom, Texas, U.S.
- Died: January 24, 1975 (aged 81); Victoria, Texas, U.S.
- Batted: Left Threw: Unknown

Negro league baseball debut
- 1920, for the St. Louis Giants

Last appearance
- 1923, for the St. Louis Stars
- Stats at Baseball Reference

Teams
- St. Louis Giants (1920–1921); St. Louis Stars (1920–1923)

Charles Arthur "Doc" Dudley, Jr, (January 10, 1894 – January 24, 1975) was an American professional baseball outfielder in the Negro leagues. He played from 1920 to 1923 with the St. Louis Giants and the St. Louis Stars He used his baseball income to become a physician. He later went onto become a civic leader, and civil rights worker.
