= Edison Reynoso =

- Pitcher
- Born: November 10, 1975 (age 49); Monte Cristi, Dominican Republic
- Bats: Right Throws: Right

Teams
- Hiroshima Toyo Carp (1999 – 2000)

Edison Reynoso (born November 10, 1975, in Monte Cristi, Dominican Republic) is a former professional baseball pitcher who played professionally from 1999 to 2004. Reynoso played in Japan for the Hiroshima Toyo Carp in the Central League in 1999 and 2000. He signed with the New York Yankees in 2001, and played in there minor league system in 2001 and 2003. In 2004, Reynoso played for both the Newark Bears and the North Shore Spirit.
