= National Register of Historic Places listings in Grainger County, Tennessee =

Location of Grainger County in Tennessee

This is a list of the National Register of Historic Places listings in Grainger County, Tennessee.

This is intended to be a complete list of the properties and districts on the National Register of Historic Places in Grainger County, Tennessee, United States. Latitude and longitude coordinates are provided for many National Register properties and districts; these locations may be seen together in a map.

There are 9 properties and districts listed on the National Register in the county, and one former listing.

Contents: Counties in Tennessee
Anderson – Bedford – Benton – Bledsoe – Blount – Bradley – Campbell – Cannon – Carroll – Carter – Cheatham – Chester – Claiborne – Clay – Cocke – Coffee – Crockett – Cumberland – Davidson – Decatur – DeKalb – Dickson – Dyer – Fayette – Fentress – Franklin – Gibson – Giles – Grainger – Greene – Grundy – Hamblen – Hamilton – Hancock – Hardeman – Hardin – Hawkins – Haywood – Henderson – Henry – Hickman – Houston – Humphreys – Jackson – Jefferson – Johnson – Knox – Lake – Lauderdale – Lawrence – Lewis – Lincoln – Loudon – Macon – Madison – Marion – Marshall – Maury – McMinn – McNairy – Meigs – Monroe – Montgomery – Moore – Morgan – Obion – Overton – Perry – Pickett – Polk – Putnam – Rhea – Roane – Robertson – Rutherford – Scott – Sequatchie – Sevier – Shelby – Smith – Stewart – Sullivan – Sumner – Tipton – Trousdale – Unicoi – Union – Van Buren – Warren – Washington – Wayne – Weakley – White – Williamson – Wilson

This National Park Service list is complete through NPS recent listings posted May 30, 2025.

== Current listings ==
	Name on the Register	Image	Date listed	Location	City or town	Description
1	William Cocke House	William Cocke House	July 3, 1980 (#80003799)	Northeast of Rutledge; 36°18′06″N 83°27′24″W	Rutledge	Home of Congressman William Michael Cocke
2	Henderson Chapel African Methodist Episcopal Zion Church	Henderson Chapel African Methodist Episcopal Zion Church	June 22, 2000 (#00000730)	Church St. 36°16′53″N 83°30′59″W	Rutledge	
3	Nance Building	Nance Building	July 1, 1998 (#98000824)	Junction of Marshall St. and U.S. Route 11W; 36°16′51″N 83°30′54″W	Rutledge	https://npgallery.nps.gov/NRHP/GetAsset/NRHP/98000824_text
4	Old Grainger County Jail	Old Grainger County Jail	July 21, 2015 (#15000446)	SE. corner of Water St. & TN 92; 36°16′47″N 83°30′53″W	Rutledge	
5	Poplar Hill	Poplar Hill	July 8, 1980 (#80003798)	Northeast of Blaine; 36°10′40″N 83°41′00″W	Blaine	Also known as the Cynthia Lea House
6	Richland	Richland	November 19, 2014 (#14000941)	1760 Rutledge Pike; 36°10′25″N 83°41′11″W	Blaine	
7	Rutledge Presbyterian Church and Cemetery	Rutledge Presbyterian Church and Cemetery	July 21, 2015 (#15000447)	123 Church St. 36°16′53″N 83°30′54″W	Rutledge	
8	Shields' Station	Shields' Station	April 24, 1973 (#73001769)	U.S. Route 11W; 36°09′52″N 83°41′45″W	Blaine	
9	Tate Springs Springhouse	Tate Springs Springhouse	April 13, 1973 (#73001768)	East of Bean Station on U.S. Route 11W; 36°20′18″N 83°20′44″W	Bean Station	

== Former listings ==
	Name on the Register	Image	Date listed	Date removed	Location	City or town	Description
1	Lea Springs	Lea Springs	May 29, 1975 (#75001754)	June 20, 2023	11 miles (18 km) southwest of Rutledge off U.S. Route 11W, west on Lea Lake Rd. 36°11′34″N 83°41′37″W	Blaine	

== See also ==
- List of National Historic Landmarks in Tennessee
- National Register of Historic Places listings in Tennessee
