= Mascot, Tennessee =

Mascot
- CDP
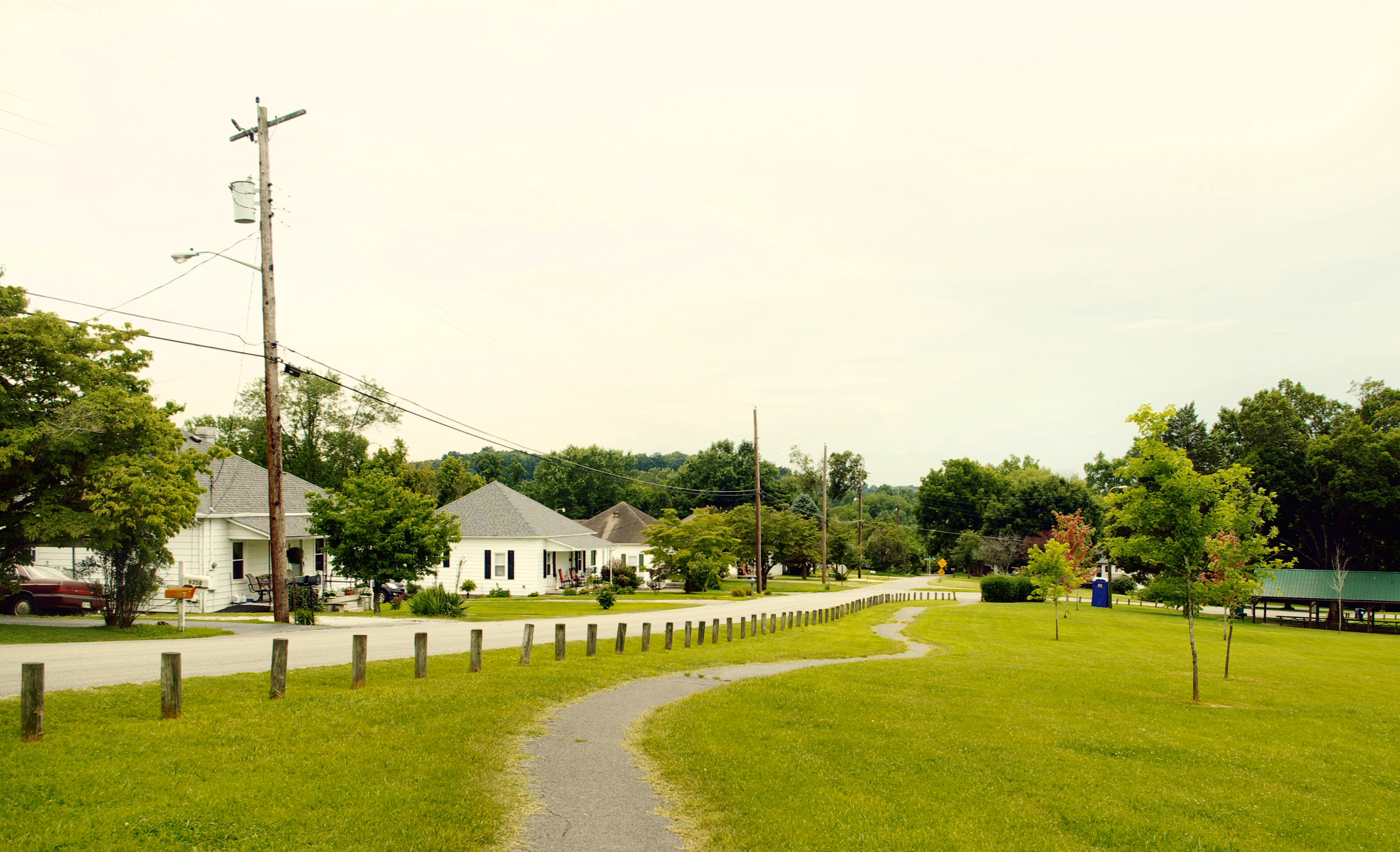
- Mascot Park (right) and houses on Tipple Dr. in Mascot, 2015

- Location in Knox County and the state of Tennessee.
- Coordinates: 36°4′2″N 83°45′17″W
- Country: United States
- State: Tennessee
- County: Knox
- Founded: 1796
- Named for: Mining and Smelting Company of Tennessee

Government
  - Type: County commission
  - Mayor: Glenn Jacobs (R)
  - Commissioners: Adam Thompson (R) (District 8); Kim Frazier (R) (At-Large); Larsen Jay (R) (At-Large)

Area
  - Total: 7.19 sq mi (18.61 km^{2})
  - Land: 6.97 sq mi (18.04 km^{2})
  - Water: 0.22 sq mi (0.57 km^{2})
- Elevation: 1,037 ft (316 m)

Population (2020)
  - Total: 2,760
  - Density: 396.3/sq mi (153.01/km^{2})
- Time zone: UTC-5 (Eastern (EST))
  - Summer (DST): UTC-4 (EDT)
- ZIP code: 37806, 37924
- Area code: 865
- FIPS code: 47-46400
- GNIS feature ID: 2403259

Mascot is a census-designated place (CDP) in Knox County, Tennessee. The population was 2,760 in the 2020 census, up from 2,411 in the 2010 census.

== History ==
The Mascot community was first reported to be established around 1796, when settler John Erwin purchased 150 acres of land by the United States government, but the expansion of the community would not occur until the 19th and 20th centuries.

Early 19th century settlement in the Mascot area may have centered on a ford across the Holston River which was known as Saylor's Ford. In 1838, Dr. George Arnold, a physician and planter, constructed a Georgian-style house known as "Chesterfield" along Old Rutledge Pike in what is now northern Mascot. The house is listed on the National Register of Historic Places. In 1884 a railroad line was constructed through the area and a post office was established under the name "Meek," apparently the surname of a local family. Knoxville's Daily Sentinel listed Mascot as the name of the new railroad station between McMillians and Strawberry Plains, near the resort Lea Springs in 1887.

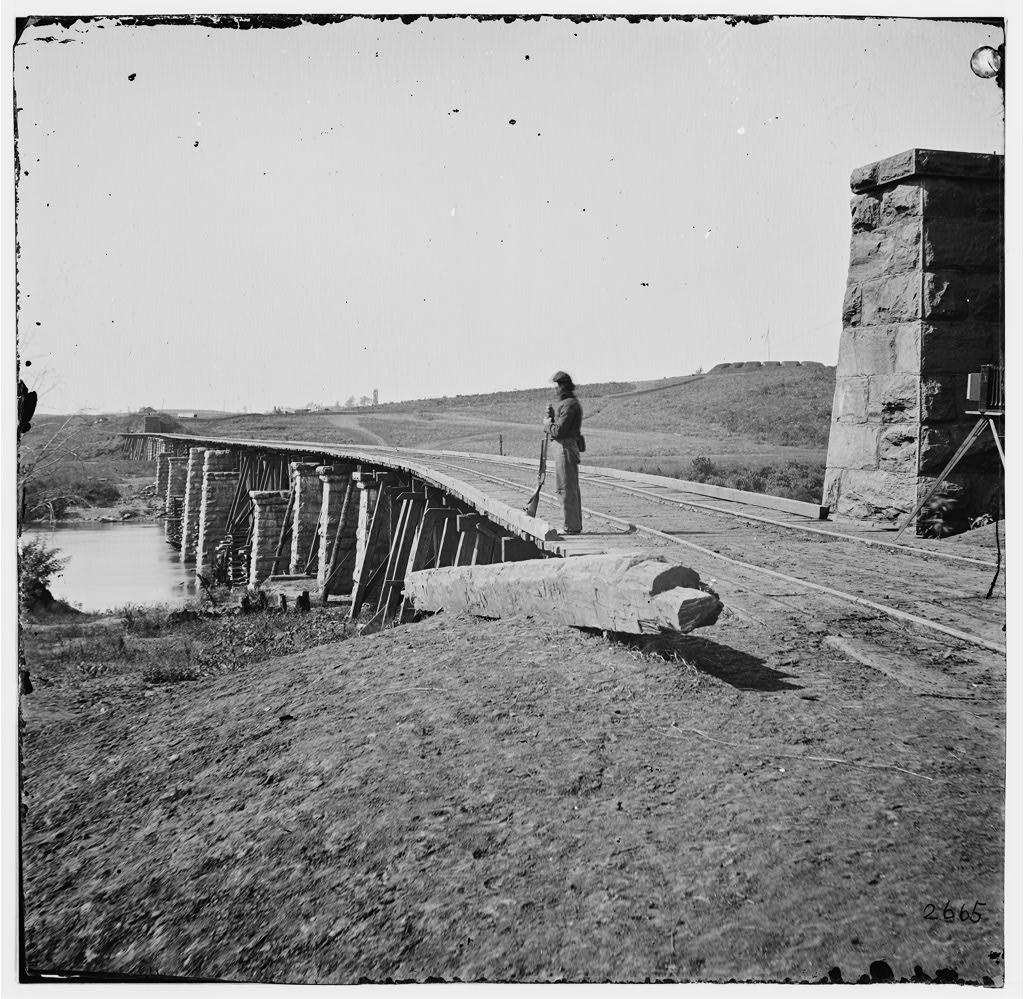
A fort at Mascot as seen from a rail trestle in Strawberry Plains, 1864

The Mascot community was formed in the early 20th century as a company town centered on the mine. The Holston Zinc Company established a mine locally in 1906, but some mining may have occurred earlier. The "Mascot" name is recorded from as early as 1904. Reports suggest the name came from an acronym for the Mining and Smelting Company of Tennessee, which once operated the mines in Mascot.

== Geography ==
Mascot is located in northeastern Knox County, Tennessee, southwestern Grainger County, Tennessee, western [[Jefferson County, Tennessee]], and is situated between U.S. Route 11W and the Holston River. It is located 14 miles northeast of Knoxville, 8 miles southwest of Blaine, and 4 miles west of Strawberry Plains.

According to the United States Census Bureau, the CDP has a total area of 7.1 square miles (18 km^{2}), of which, 6.9 square miles (18 km^{2}) of it is land and 0.2 square miles (0.52 km^{2}) of it (2.39%) is water.

== Demographics ==
Historical population
Census	Pop.	Note	%±
2000	2,119		—
2010	2,411		13.8%
2020	2,760		14.5%

As of the 2010 United States census, there were 2,411 people, 971 households, and 670 families residing in the CDP. The population density was 304.7 inhabitants per square mile (117.6/km^{2}). There were 934 housing units at an average density of 134.3 per square mile (51.9/km^{2}). The racial makeup of the CDP was 93.9% White, 3.2% African American, 0.1% Native American, 0.1% Asian, 0.5% from other races, and 2.1% from two or more races. Hispanic or Latino of any race were 1.7% of the population.

There were 971 households, out of which 26.4% had children 18 and under living with them, 51.1% were married couples living together, 12.5% had a female householder with no husband present, and 31.0% were non-families. 26.5% of all households were made up of individuals, and 9.9% had someone living alone who was 65 years of age or older. The average household size was 2.48 and the average family size was 2.96. 12.1% of the population are veterans.

In the CDP, the population was spread out, with 25.6% under the age of 20, 4.0% from 20 to 24, 26.4% from 25 to 44, 30.4% from 45 to 64, and 13.7% who were 65 years of age or older. The median age was 38 years. For all ages, there were 48.7% males and 51.3% females. There were 1,111 total housing units. 87.4% (971) of which were occupied and 12.6% (140) vacant. The largest portion of vacant houses consisting of non-rented/occupied and not for sale at 6.0% (67).

The median income for a household in the CDP was $47,737 and the median income for a family was $59,375. Male full-time, year-round workers had a median income of $43,192 versus $31,008 for females. The per capita income for the CDP was $25,689. About 3.1% of families and 9.0% of the population were below the poverty line, including 8.3% of those over the age of 65 and none of those age 18 and under. Most reported sales and office occupations at 41.6%, then 21.7% in management, business, science, and arts occupations, 15.4% production, transportation, and material moving occupations, 11.0% natural resources, construction, and maintenance occupations, and 4.8% in service occupations.

In the CDP, it was reported that 4.8% of the population had less than a 9th grade education, 9th-12th no diploma at 11.6%, high school or equivalent at 46.2%, some college no degree at 17.0%, associate's degree at 6.4%, bachelor's degree at 10.6% and graduate degree or professional degree at 4.3%. Thus, the percent high school graduate or higher is reported to be 83.5% and those with a bachelor's degree or higher at 14.9%.

== Economy ==
The Eastbridge Business Park, an 800-acre industrial park and federally designated opportunity zone, is in Mascot. It is home to three large industrial facilities operated by Exedy America, Timken RBS, and Lifetime Products.

The community, while predominately rural, is considered to be the epicenter for zinc mining in Knox and Grainger Counties having been the site of a zinc mining industry for decades. Several rock quarries near the Holston River have also been in the area.

== Education ==
=== Public schools ===
Students in the Mascot area attend the following schools

- East Knox County Elementary School located in Mascot
- Carter Middle School in Carter
