= Poplar Hill (Blaine, Tennessee) =

- U.S. National Register of Historic Places
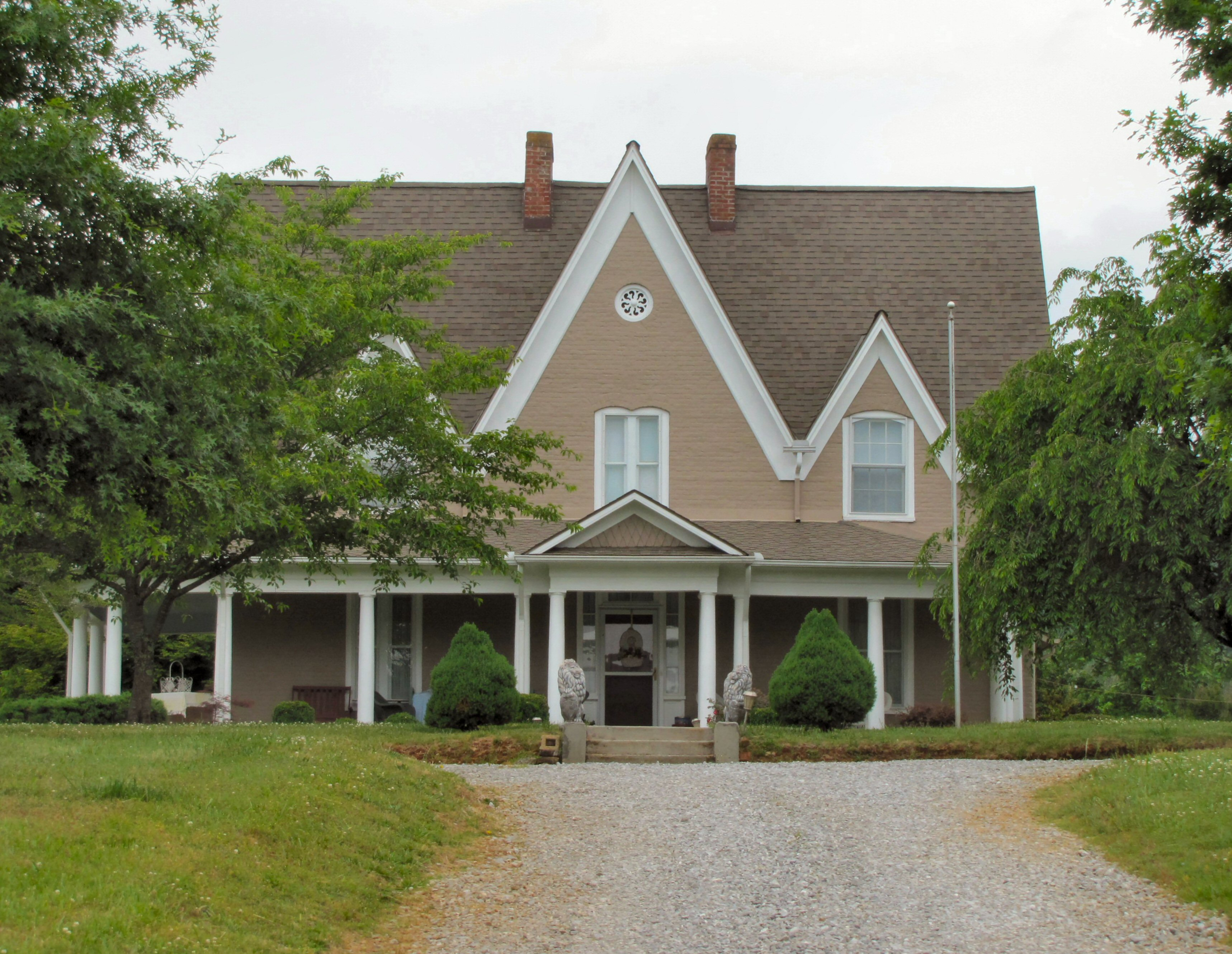

- Location within Tennessee
- Nearest city: Blaine, Tennessee
- Coordinates: 36°10′40″N 83°41′00″W
- Area: 2.5 acres (1.0 ha)
- Built: 1830
- Architectural style: Gothic Revival, Early Gothic Revival
- NRHP reference No.: 80003798
- Added to NRHP: July 8, 1980

Poplar Hill is a historic house in Blaine, Tennessee, United States. It was built in 1830 for Cynthia Lea, Major Lea's daughter. Lea grew up at Richland, and she moved into Poplar Hill as soon as she married Elihu Milliken, a Baptist minister. It was later purchased by Willis Idol, a physician.

The house was designed in the Gothic Revival architectural style. It has been listed on the National Register of Historic Places since July 8, 1980.
