= Poplar Hill =

Poplar Hill may refer to:

- Poplar Hill First Nation, Ontario
- Poplar Hill (Cynthiana, Kentucky), a National Register of Historic Places listing in Harrison County, Kentucky
- Poplar Hill (Aberdeen, Maryland)
- Poplar Hill Mansion Salisbury, Maryland
- Poplar Hill (Glen Cove, New York)
- Poplar Hill (Hillsborough, North Carolina)
- Poplar Hill (Hamilton County, New York)
- Poplar Hill (Blaine, Tennessee)
- Poplar Hill (Smithfield, Virginia)

== Other ==
- His Lordship's Kindness, estate in Clinton, Maryland, also known as Poplar Hill.
