= Lea Springs, Tennessee =

Unincorporated community in Tennessee, US

- Unincorporated community
- Lea Springs
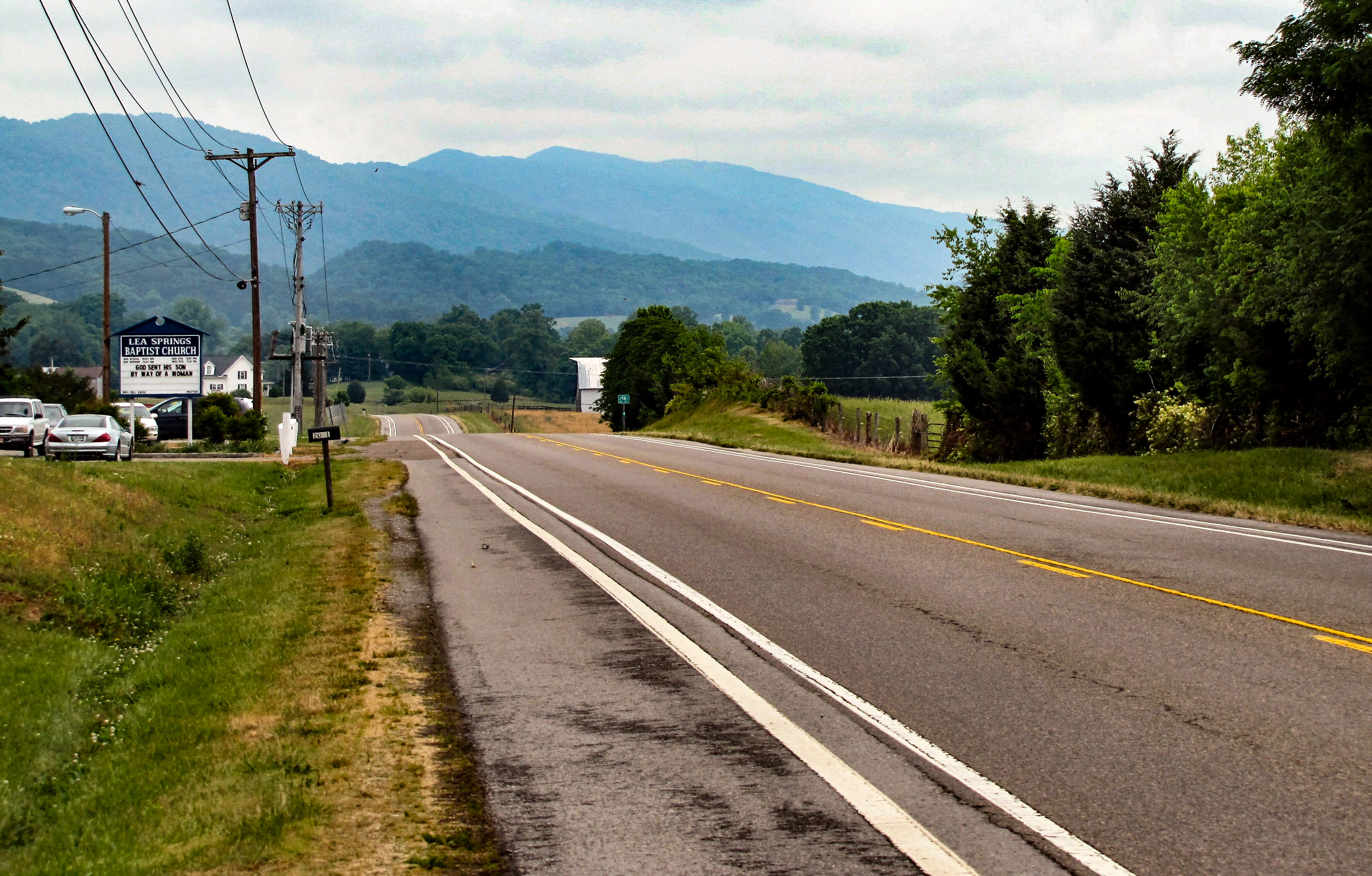
- U.S. Route 11W in Lea Springs with Clinch Mountain in the background.

- Location within Tennessee Location within the United States
- Coordinates: 36.178551°N 83.682259°W
- Country: United States
- State: Tennessee
- County: Grainger
- City: Blaine
- Elevation: 961 ft (293 m)
- Time zone: UTC-5 (Eastern (EST))
  - Summer (DST): UTC-4 (EDT)
- ZIP code: 37709
- Area code: 865
- GNIS feature ID: 1314267

Lea Springs is an unincorporated community in southwestern Grainger County, Tennessee. It is located two miles northeast of the city of Blaine. It is also located partially inside Blaine's city limits and urban growth boundary.

== History ==
Lea Springs was the site of a historic mansion of the same name. It was built by slaves in 1819 for Pryor Lea, who grew up in nearby Richland. Lea became a politician in Tennessee and Texas, and he was a founding trustee of the University of Mississippi. He died in 1879, and the house was remodeled as a resort in the 1880s.

The mansion was designed in the Federal architectural style, and was listed on the National Register of Historic Places. It was demolished in 2008 and the property was de-listed in 2023.
