= Samuel Bunch =

American politician

Member of the U.S. House of Representatives from Tennessee's 2nd district
- In office March 4, 1833 – March 3, 1837
- Preceded by: Thomas Dickens Arnold
- Succeeded by: Abraham McClellan

Personal details
- Born: December 4, 1786 Grainger County, Tennessee
- Died: September 5, 1849 (aged 63) Rutledge, Tennessee, U.S.
- Resting place: Bunch Family Farm, Rutledge, Tennessee
- Party: Whig
- Spouse: Amanda Anderson Bunch
- Profession: farmer, soldier

Military service
- Branch/service: Tennessee militia
- Years of service: 1813–1814
- Rank: Captain
- Battles/wars: Creek War

Samuel Bunch (December 4, 1786 – September 5, 1849) was an American politician who represented Tennessee's 2nd district in the United States House of Representatives from 1833 to 1837.

== Life and career ==
Bunch was born in what is now Grainger County, Tennessee, the son of John and Mary (Asher) Bunch. He attended the public schools and engaged in agricultural pursuits. He married Amanda Anderson, daughter of Joseph M. and Mary Cocke Anderson about 1806 in Granger County. Bunch was a slaveowner.

Colonel Bunch originally commanded the 1st Regiment of Volunteer Mounted Riflemen of the Tennessee militia composed of three-month enlistees from October 1813 to January 1814. During his time of command, the unit was involved in numerous conflicts with the Creek Indians. At the Battle of Little Oakfuskie, Bunch and his men surrounded the Native American village at dawn and sprung an ambush that resulted in the killing of 60 Native Americans and the capture of over 200 more while taking no American casualties. On January 10, 1814, Bunch was granted command of the 2nd Regiment of Volunteer Mounted Riflemen and stayed in command until July 14, 1814. Reports have indicated that multiple companies within Bunch's Regiment were dispatched from Fort Williams to serve under General Andrew Jackson in the Battle of Horseshoe Bend. During this engagement, Bunch's men were positioned on the right flank of the advancing force. Due to being under the command of General Jackson, Bunch was known to have written the future President as a friend even after the war. He was sheriff of Grainger County for several years. From 1819 to 1823, he represented Campbell, Claiborne, and Grainger counties in the Tennessee Senate. In 1820, he voted against the bill establishing the Bank of Tennessee.

Samuel Bunch was elected to Congress in 1833, defeating former 2nd district representative John Cocke, 4,319 votes to 1,815 (the incumbent, Thomas D. Arnold, moved to the 1st district). He was reelected by a similar margin in 1835. Bunch served as a Jacksonian in the Twenty-third Congress and as an Anti-Jacksonian in the Twenty-fourth Congress, and subsequently joined the Whig Party. In 1837, he was defeated in his reelection effort by the Democratic candidate, Abraham McClellan, 3,228 votes to 2,741.

His son, McDonough J. Bunch, was the principal clerk of the U.S. House of Representatives during 1845-46. He served as major of the 4th Regiment Tennessee Volunteers in the Mexican War. In May 1850, he led the skeleton Mississippi Regiment in the Narciso Lopez invasion of Cuba.

Samuel Bunch resumed agricultural pursuits and died on his farm near Rutledge, Tennessee on September 5, 1849 (age 62 years, 275 days). He is interred at a private cemetery on his farm.

U.S. House of Representatives
Preceded by Thomas D. Arnold	Member of the U.S. House of Representatives from Tennessee's 2nd congressional district 1833-1837	Succeeded by Abraham McClellan
