= Abraham McClellan (Tennessee politician) =

American politician (1789–1866)

Member of the U.S. House of Representatives from Tennessee's 2nd district
- In office March 4, 1837 – March 3, 1843
- Preceded by: Samuel Bunch
- Succeeded by: William Tandy Senter

Member of the Tennessee Senate
- In office 1829-1833

Member of the Tennessee House of Representatives
- In office 1823-1825; 1827-1829

Personal details
- Born: October 4, 1789 Sullivan County, Tennessee, U.S.
- Died: May 3, 1866 (aged 76) Sullivan County, Tennessee, U.S.
- Party: Democratic Party
- Education: Washington College
- Profession: Farmer

Military service
- Branch/service: Tennessee militia
- Years of service: 1836–1837
- Rank: Captain
- Commands: 2nd Regiment, 2nd Brigade, Mounted Volunteers
- Battles/wars: Seminole Wars

Abraham McClellan (October 4, 1789 – May 3, 1866) was an American politician that represented Tennessee's 2nd district in the United States House of Representatives from 1837 to 1843. He also served several terms in the Tennessee House of Representatives and the Tennessee Senate, commanded a militia company during the Seminole Wars (1836–1837). He was a slaveholder.

== Biography ==
=== Early life ===
McClellan was born at "White Top" in Sullivan County, Tennessee, on October 4, 1789. He attended the common schools, graduated from Washington College near Greeneville, Tennessee, and engaged in agricultural pursuits.

=== Career ===
He was a member of the Tennessee House of Representatives from 1823 to 1825 and from 1827 to 1829. He served in the Tennessee Senate from 1829 to 1833. He was a member of the convention to revise the Tennessee State Constitution in 1834. McClellan served as captain of the Second Regiment, Second Brigade, Tennessee Mounted Volunteer Militia during the Seminole Wars, from 1836 to 1837.

In 1837, McClellan, a Democrat, defeated incumbent Samuel Bunch, 3,228 votes to 2,741, in the election for the 2nd district seat in the U.S. House of Representatives. He was easily reelected in 1839, and brushed off a challenge from rising Whig politician William T. Senter in 1841. McClellan served in the Twenty-fifth, Twenty-sixth, and Twenty-seventh congresses, from March 4, 1837, to March 3, 1843.

In 1843, his home county, Sullivan, was redistricted to the 1st district. This was part of an effort initiated by rising politician Andrew Johnson, who planned to run for the 1st district seat, and wanted to ensure the new district's boundaries were favorable to Democrats. The state legislature also wanted to get rid of the 1st district's fiery incumbent, Thomas D. Arnold. Realizing he had little chance of winning the nomination over Johnson, McClellan chose not to seek a fourth term.

After leaving Congress, he resumed agricultural pursuits and died at his home, "White Top," in Sullivan County on May 3, 1866.

U.S. House of Representatives
Preceded by Samuel Bunch	Member of the U.S. House of Representatives from Tennessee's 2nd congressional district 1837-1843	Succeeded by William T. Senter
