= William Cocke House =

Historic house in Tennessee, United States

- U.S. National Register of Historic Places
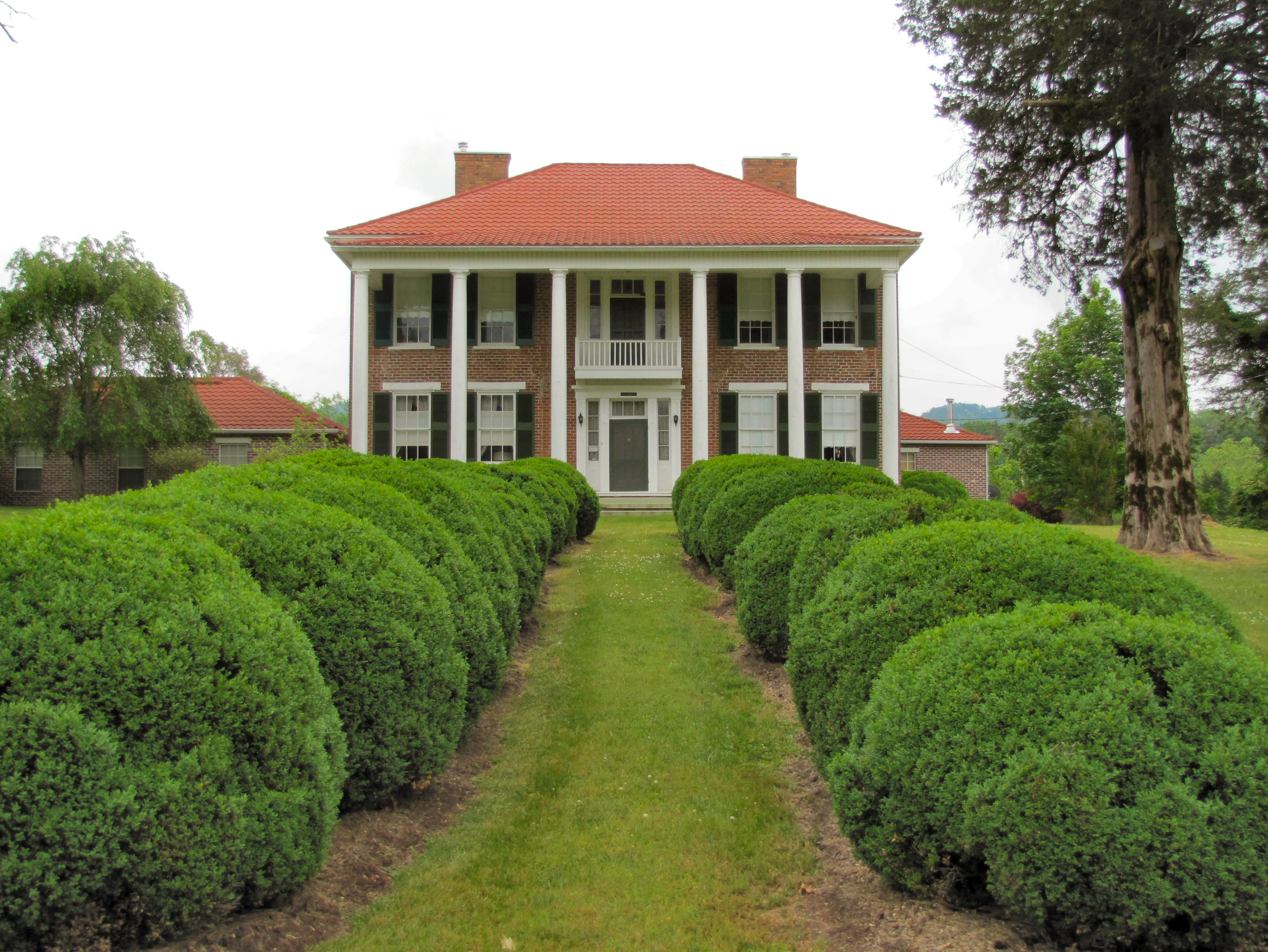

- Location within Tennessee Location within the United States
- Nearest city: Rutledge, Tennessee
- Coordinates: 36°18′6″N 83°27′24″W
- Area: 6.1 acres (2.5 ha)
- Built: 1850
- Architectural style: Greek Revival
- NRHP reference No.: 80003799
- Added to NRHP: July 3, 1980

The William Cocke House is a historic house registered on the National Register of Historic Places, located along Old U.S. Route 11W near Rutledge, Tennessee. It is locally significant as a reminder of Grainger County's political history, and as an example of the Greek Revival style of architecture displayed in East Tennessee.

== Description and history ==
The 2-story brick structure, built c. 1850 in the Greek Revival style, rests on a solid brick foundation. A one-story ell attached to the south elevation serves as the kitchen. The house is arranged in a rectilinear floor plan with a central hall, interior chimneys and covered with a pitched hip roof with asphalt shingles. was built in 1850. It was the home of William Michael Cocke. A member of a politically prominent family, he represented Grainger County in both the Tennessee House of Representatives and Tennessee Senate, and served in the U.S. House of Representatives from 1845 to 1849.

The house was listed on the National Register of Historic Places on July 3, 1980.
