= William Tandy Senter =

American politician (1801–1848)

Member of the U.S. House of Representatives from Tennessee's 2nd district
- In office March 4, 1843 – March 3, 1845
- Preceded by: Abraham McClellan
- Succeeded by: William Michael Cocke

Personal details
- Born: May 12, 1801 Bean Station, Tennessee, U.S.
- Died: August 28, 1848 (aged 47) Panther Springs, Hamblen County, Tennessee, U.S.
- Party: Whig
- Spouse: Nancy White Senter
- Children: William Tandy Senter, Dewitt Clinton Senter
- Profession: Methodist Minister; farmer; politician

William Tandy Senter (May 12, 1801 – August 28, 1848) was an American politician that represented Tennessee's second district in the United States House of Representatives.

== Biography ==
Senter was born to slave-owners William Tandy Senter & Susan Lyon at Bean Station, Tennessee on May 12, 1801. He attended the common schools, and engaged in agricultural pursuits as well as holding several local offices. He married Nancy White.

== Career ==
A minister in the Holston Conference of the Methodist Episcopal Church, South, Senter was also a member of the State constitutional convention, which met at Nashville from May 19 to August 30, 1834.

Senter was elected as a Whig to the Twenty-eighth Congress, and served from March 4, 1843, to March 3, 1845.

After his service, Senter resumed agricultural and ministerial work at Panther Springs, Hamblen County, Tennessee.

== Death and legacy ==
Senter died at Panther Springs on August 28, 1848. He is interred at Senter Memorial Church Cemetery. The city of Centerville, Iowa was named in his honor, although the spelling was changed because a clerk assumed the proposed name "Senterville" was a misspelling.

U.S. House of Representatives
Preceded by Abraham McClellan	Member of the U.S. House of Representatives from Tennessee's 2nd congressional district 1843-1845	Succeeded by William M. Cocke
