= Chesterfield House, Knoxville, Tennessee =

Historic house in Tennessee, United States

- Chesterfield
- U.S. National Register of Historic Places
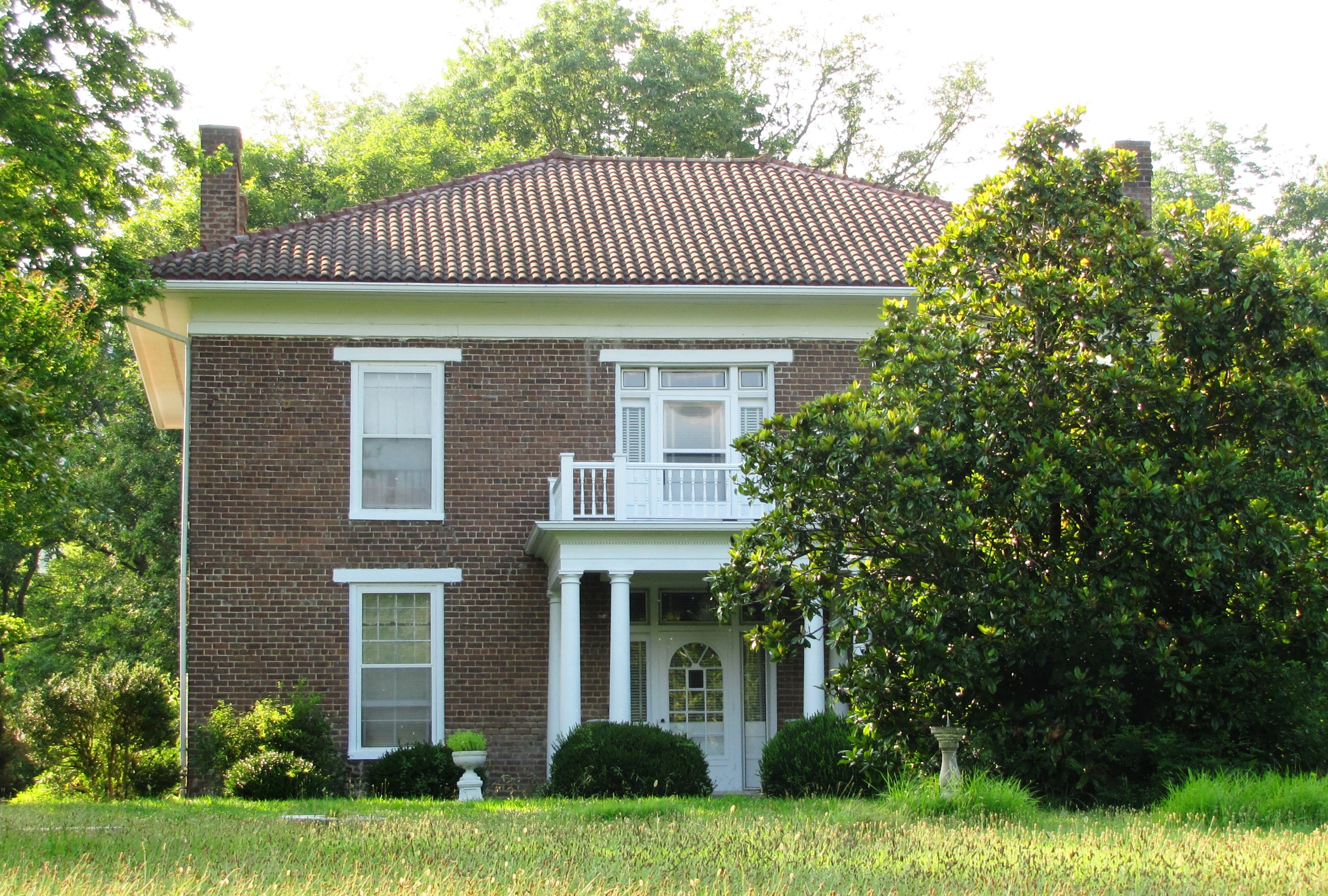
- Location: 9625 Old Rutledge Pike, Mascot, Tennessee, 37806
- Nearest city: Knoxville, Tennessee
- Coordinates: 36°5′37″N 83°45′6″W
- Built: 1838
- Architect: Arthur Savage
- Architectural style: Georgian (influence)
- NRHP reference No.: 77001276
- Added to NRHP: November 16, 1977

The Chesterfield House is an Antebellum house at 9625 Old Rutledge Pike in the Mascot community of northeastern Knox County, Tennessee. Built in 1838 by George W. Arnold, a physician from Roanoke, Virginia, the house is now listed on the National Register of Historic Places. It was located along a stagecoach route (roughly what is now US 11) that began in Washington, D.C., passed through Knoxville, and continued further south. Stagecoaches made stops at Chesterfield.

The mansion is a two-story brick structure with a one-story covered front porch. The porch has a balcony above, accessed off a second floor room. Architecturally, the house has Georgian influences. It remains a private residence, and is not open to the public.
