= Rutledge, Tennessee =

- City
- City of Rutledge
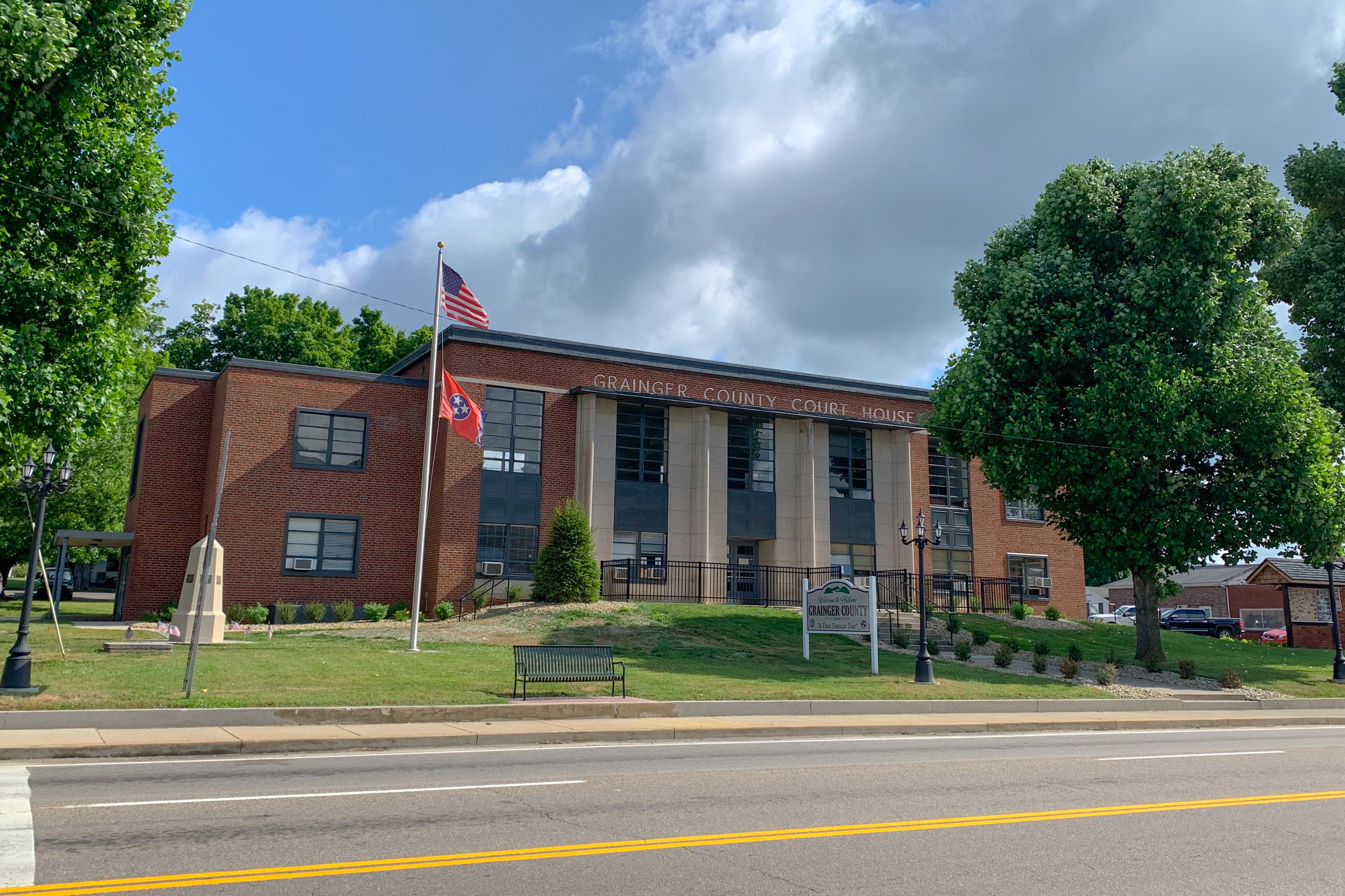
- Grainger County Courthouse in Rutledge

- Location of Rutledge in Grainger County, Tennessee.
- Coordinates: 36°16′48″N 83°31′5″W
- Country: United States
- State: Tennessee
- County: Grainger
- Incorporated: 1797
- Reincorporated: 1955
- Named for: George Rutledge

Government
  - Type: Mayor-aldermen
  - Mayor: Fred Sykes
  - Vice Mayor: Benny Atkins
  - Aldermen: List of Aldermen: Ed Boling; Martha Cameron; Jason Day; Benny Atkins

Area
  - Total: 5.54 sq mi (14.34 km^{2})
  - Land: 5.53 sq mi (14.33 km^{2})
  - Water: 0.0039 sq mi (0.01 km^{2})
- Elevation: 1,020 ft (310 m)

Population (2020)
  - Total: 1,321
  - Density: 238.8/sq mi (92.21/km^{2})
- Time zone: UTC-5 (Eastern (EST))
  - Summer (DST): UTC-4 (EDT)
- ZIP code: 37861
- Area code: 865
- FIPS code: 47-65820
- GNIS feature ID: 1269919

Rutledge is a city in and the county seat of Grainger County, Tennessee. The city is part of both the Knoxville metropolitan area and the Morristown metropolitan area. As of the 2020 census, the city had a total population of 1,321.

== History ==
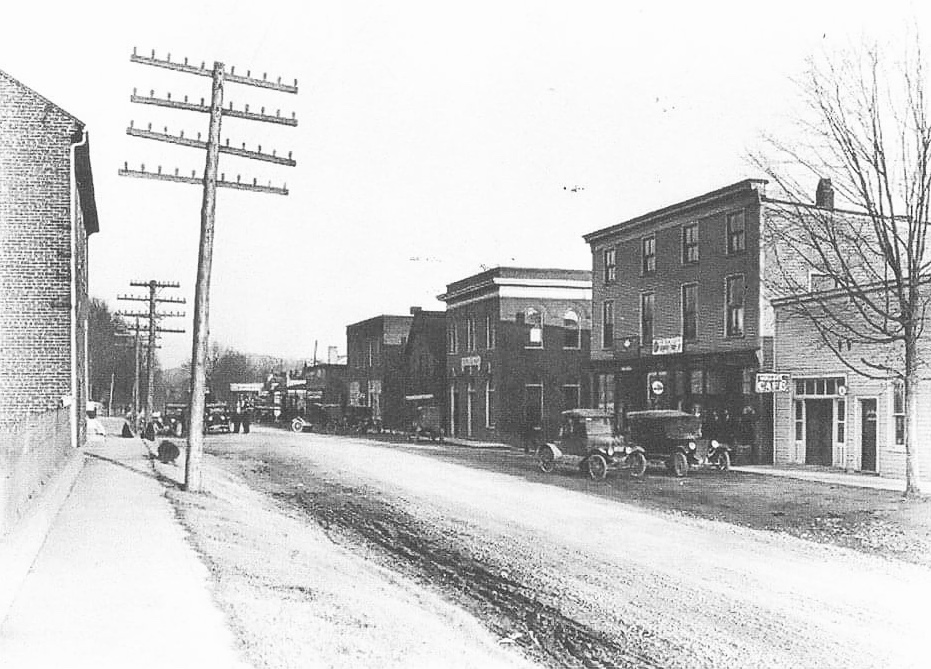
Downtown Rutledge, circa 1910s

Rutledge was established and incorporated in 1797 and named for General George Rutledge, a prominent citizen in nearby Sullivan County. At the time of its incorporation, it became the first municipality to have its own police department in Grainger County. In 1801, Rutledge became the official county seat of Grainger County, a distinction that had been shared by several communities since the county's formation in 1796. Rutledge prospered in the early 19th century in part due to its situation along the Federal Road (present day US 11W), which connected New Orleans and Virginia. The road intersected the Wilderness Road (present day US 25E) at Bean Station, just east of Rutledge.

In the 1820s, President Andrew Johnson, who worked as a tailor in Greeneville, briefly operated a tailor shop in Rutledge. In 1976, a replica of Johnson's tailor shop was erected on the Grainger County Courthouse lawn.

During the U.S. Civil War, guerilla warfare largely paralyzed Grainger County. In December 1863, Confederate General James Longstreet, who had earlier failed to wrest Knoxville from Union forces, passed through Rutledge en route to winter quarters at Russellville. On December 14, in what became known as the Battle of Bean's Station, Longstreet attacked a Union detachment that had been pursuing him. The Confederates failed to exploit the element of surprise, and the Union forces were able to hold out until reinforcements arrived. While Longstreet was victorious, Union forces were able to retreat to fortifications at Blaine, and Longstreet subsequently abandoned the assault and continued eastward to Russellville.

In May 1955, following efforts from the community's Lions Club, Rutledge would vote to reincorporate into a city in an overwhelming 192 in favor compared to 21 against incorporation. Following the reincorporation, the city would construct sewage treatment and waterworks systems to promote economic development with funding given from the Eisenhower administration's Rural Development Program.

== Geography ==
Rutledge is situated near the center of Richland Valley, a narrow valley that stretches for some 35 miles (56 km) along the southern base of Clinch Mountain between Blaine and Bean Station. Richland Creek traverses most of the valley en route to its confluence along the Cherokee Lake impoundment of the Holston River, approximately 20 miles (32 km) downstream from Rutledge. Cherokee Lake's Ray Creek embayment is located approximately 10 miles (16 km) east of Rutledge.

Rutledge is centered around the junction of U.S. Route 11W, which connects the city to Kingsport to the east and Knoxville to the west, and State Route 92, which connects the city to Jefferson County, Interstate 40, and Interstate 81 to the south. U.S. Route 25E, which traverses Clinch Mountain, intersects US-11W in nearby Bean Station.

According to the United States Census Bureau, the city has a total area of 4.7 square miles (12 km^{2}), all land.

== Demographics ==
Historical population
| Census | Pop. | Note | %± |
|---|---|---|---|
| 1870 | 107 | | — |
| 1880 | 126 | | 17.8% |
| 1890 | 143 | | 13.5% |
| 1960 | 793 | | — |
| 1970 | 863 | | 8.8% |
| 1980 | 1,058 | | 22.6% |
| 1990 | 903 | | −14.7% |
| 2000 | 1,187 | | 31.5% |
| 2010 | 1,122 | | −5.5% |
| 2020 | 1,321 | | 17.7% |

=== 2020 census ===
Rutledge racial composition
| Race | Number | Percentage |
|---|---|---|
| White (non-Hispanic) | 1,238 | 93.72% |
| Black or African American (non-Hispanic) | 10 | 0.76% |
| Native American | 3 | 0.23% |
| Asian | 5 | 0.38% |
| Pacific Islander | 1 | 0.08% |
| Other/Mixed | 45 | 3.41% |
| Hispanic or Latino | 19 | 1.44% |

As of the 2020 United States census, there were 1,321 people, 611 households, and 355 families residing in the town.

=== 2000 census ===
As of the census of 2000, there were 1,187 people, 475 households, and 298 families residing in the city. The population density was 253.1 inhabitants per square mile (97.7/km^{2}). There were 530 housing units at an average density of 113.0 per square mile (43.6/km^{2}). The racial makeup of the city was 96.88% White, 2.02% African American, 0.08% Native American, 0.08% Asian, 0.42% from other races, and 0.51% from two or more races. Hispanic or Latino of any race were 1.01% of the population.

There were 475 households, out of which 27.2% had children under the age of 18 living with them, 46.9% were married couples living together, 14.1% had a female householder with no husband present, and 37.1% were non-families. 34.7% of all households were made up of individuals, and 18.1% had someone living alone who was 65 years of age or older. The average household size was 2.17 and the average family size was 2.76.

In the city, the population was spread out, with 19.0% under the age of 18, 5.7% from 18 to 24, 28.1% from 25 to 44, 21.7% from 45 to 64, and 25.4% who were 65 years of age or older. The median age was 43 years. For every 100 females, there were 86.1 males. For every 100 females age 18 and over, there were 83.2 males.

The median income for a household in the city was $24,276, and the median income for a family was $33,571. Males had a median income of $26,151 versus $20,677 for females. The per capita income for the city was $14,477. About 11.8% of families and 20.0% of the population were below the poverty line, including 20.8% of those under the age of 18 and 31.9% of those 65 and older.

== Arts and culture ==
=== Tomato Festival ===
Rutledge Middle School in Rutledge is the location of the Grainger County Tomato Festival, which celebrates the tomato, Grainger County's most popular cash crop, annually since 1992. Around thirty-thousand festival-goers across the state of Tennessee and the United States gather to witness events about the county's heritage and its significant agricultural impact across the state of Tennessee, enjoy live music performances, purchase local produce and handmade gifts, and take part in arts and crafts events. The Grainger County Tomato Festival takes place during the final weekend in July.

=== Historic sites ===
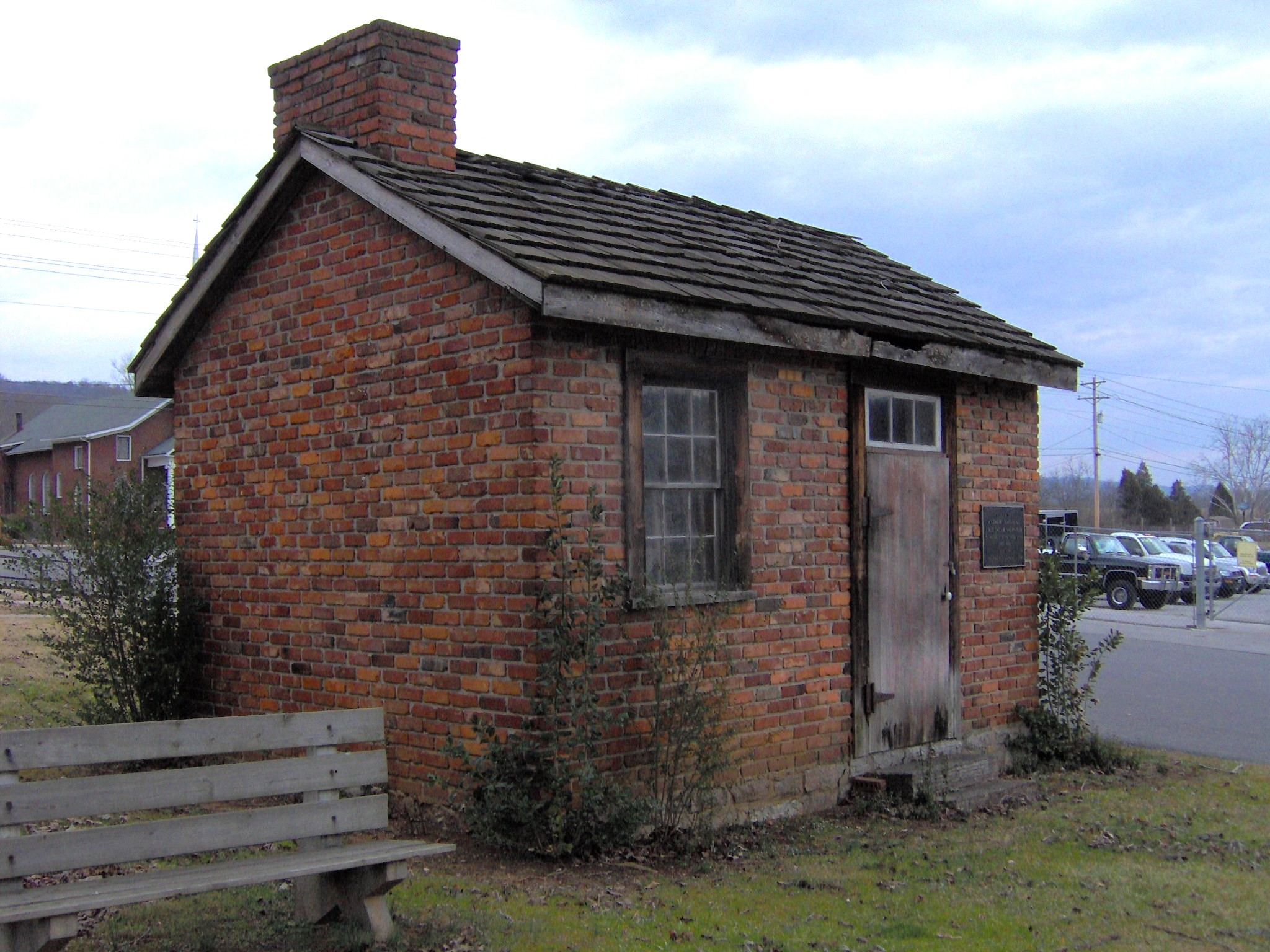
Replica of Andrew Johnson's tailor shop

- Henderson Chapel African Methodist Episcopal Zion Church
- Nance Building
- Old Grainger County Jail
- William Cocke House

== Education ==
Grainger County Schools includes Grainger High School.

== Notable people ==
- Samuel Bunch (1786–1849), Congressman and state legislator
- John Alexander Cocke (1772–1854), Congressman and rival of Andrew Jackson during the Creek War
- William Michael Cocke (1815–1896), Congressman and state legislator
- A. W. Davis (1943–2014), All-American basketball player at the University of Tennessee
- Robert Taylor Jones (1884–1958), ninth governor of Arizona, was born in Rutledge.
- James F. Lawrence Jr. (1918–2006), American Marine Corps Navy Cross recipient, lawyer
- Harold Theodore Tate (1875–1960), 26th Treasurer of the United States under President Calvin Coolidge
