= Shields' Station =

- U.S. National Register of Historic Places
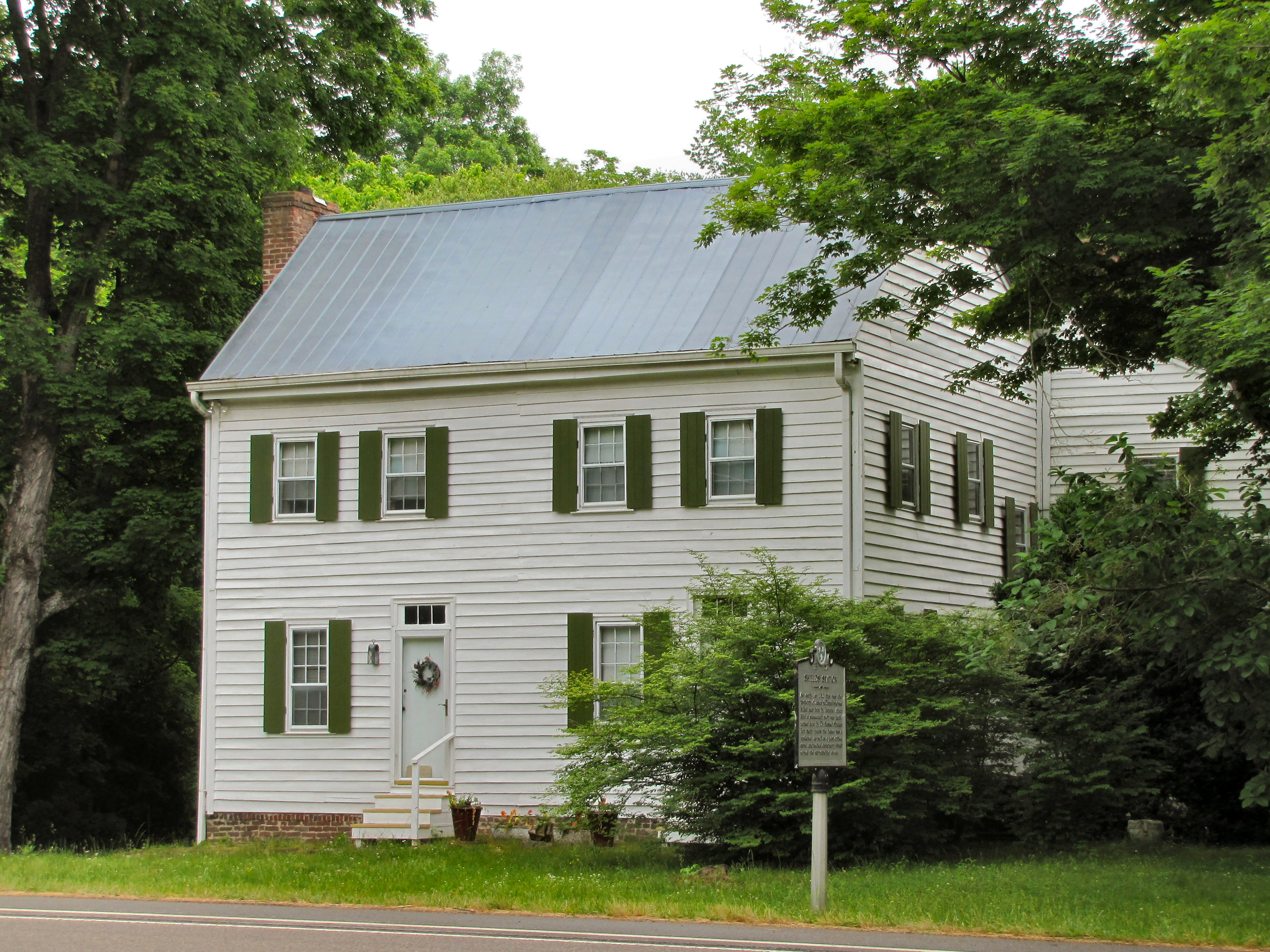

- Location within Tennessee Location within the United States
- Location: U.S. 11W, Blaine, Tennessee
- Coordinates: 36°09′52″N 83°41′45″W
- Area: 5 acres (2.0 ha)
- Built: 1830
- Architectural style: Salt-box
- NRHP reference No.: 73001769
- Added to NRHP: April 24, 1973

Shields' Station, also known as Shields' Tavern, is a historic building in Blaine, Tennessee, that is listed on the National Register of Historic Places.

A tavern was established at the site around 1830. It was acquired by Dr. Samuel Shields, who operated the property as a stagecoach stop, tavern, store, medical dispensary, and post office. It was an important stop for travelers until the 1860s.
