= Henderson Chapel African Methodist Episcopal Zion Church =

Historic church in Tennessee, United States

- U.S. National Register of Historic Places
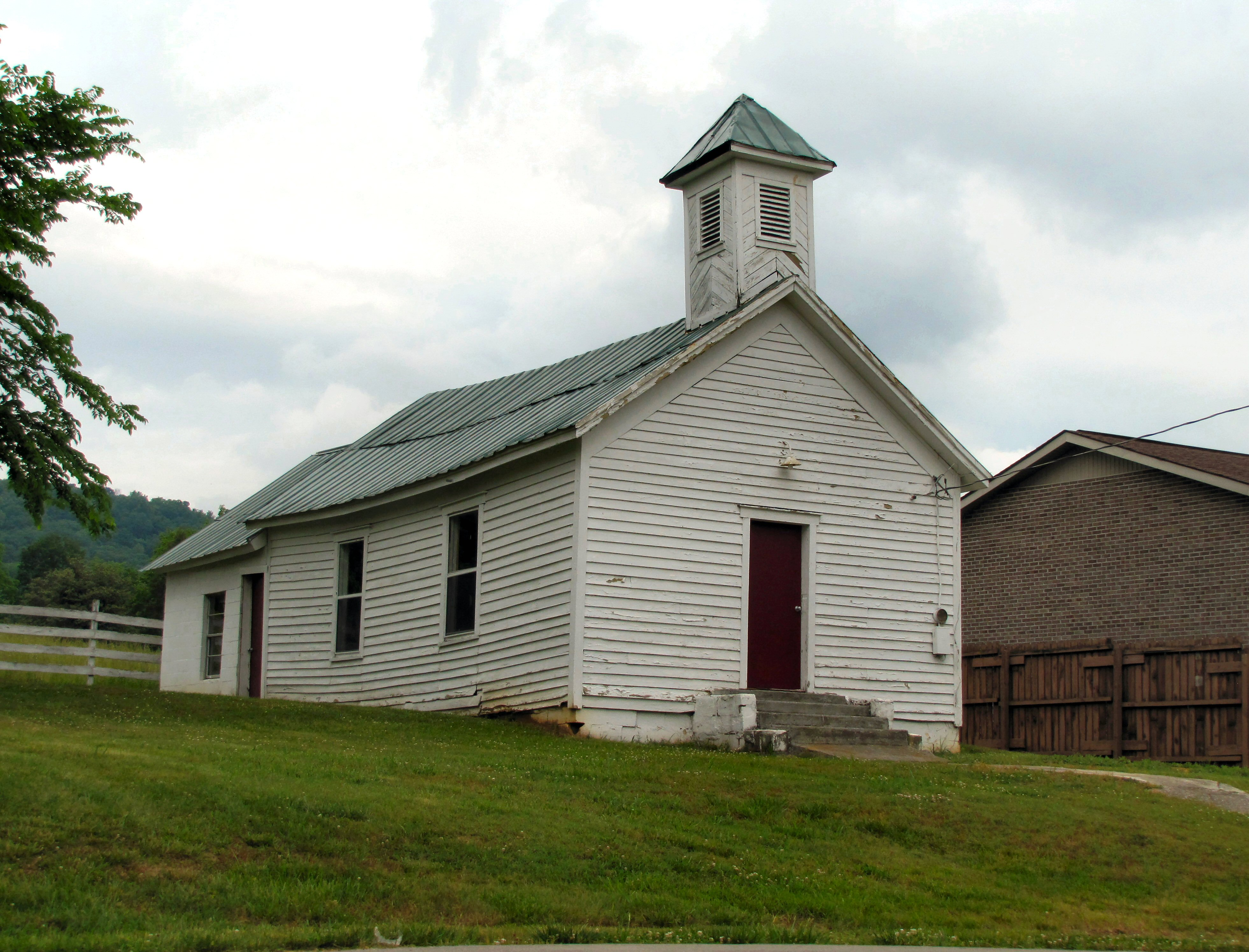

- Location within Tennessee Location within the United States
- Location: Church St., Rutledge, Tennessee
- Coordinates: 36°16′53″N 83°30′59″W
- Area: 1 acre (0.40 ha)
- Built: 1890
- MPS: Rural African-American Churches in Tennessee MPS
- NRHP reference No.: 00000730
- Added to NRHP: June 22, 2000

Henderson Chapel African Methodist Episcopal Zion Church is a historic African-American church on Church Street in Rutledge, Tennessee.

The church building was constructed in 1890. It is a frame building with a gable entrance, a vernacular design that is commonly seen in rural African-American churches built in the twentieth century.

The church was added to the National Register of Historic Places in 2000.
