= Nance Building =

National Register of Historic Places site in Rutledge, Tennessee, United States

- U.S. National Register of Historic Places
- U.S. National Historic Site
- Nance House Arts and Heritage Center
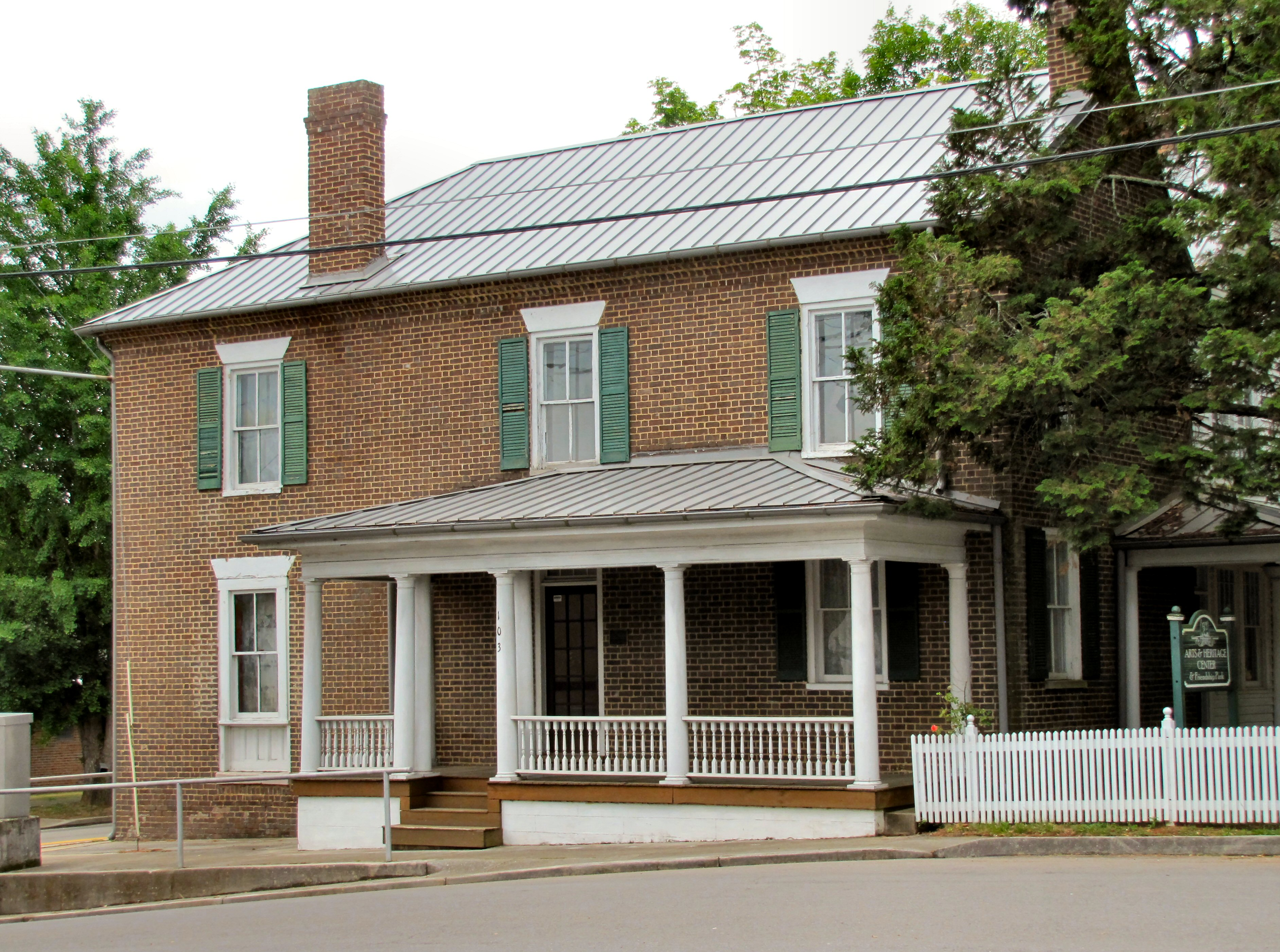
- Nance Building viewed from Marshall Avenue

- Location within Tennessee Location within the United States
- Location: Junction of Marshall Avenue and U.S. Route 11W (Rutledge Pike), Rutledge, Tennessee, United States
- Coordinates: 36.280861°N 83.515092°W
- Area: 1 acre (0.40 ha)
- Built: 1840
- Architectural style: Federal, Folk Victorian, Colonial Revival
- NRHP reference No.: 98000824
- Added to NRHP: June 5, 1998

The Nance Building is a historic building listed on the National Register of Historic Places in downtown Rutledge, Tennessee, United States. It is currently used as the historic Nance House Arts and Heritage Center, a history museum and cultural center aimed at preserving Grainger County historical items of interest.

== History ==
The Nance Building is considered to be one of the last remaining Antebellum era structures in Grainger County.

In its early years, the structure was used for commercial uses as a tavern and a general store until the late 19th century, when it became a mixed-use private residence and restaurant. In the 1970s, the building fell into disrepair after the decline in health of the property's owner. With the passing of the owner in 1997, the City of Rutledge acquired the structure and its surrounding grounds for future plans as a historic center and public park.

In 2018, The structure received interior renovation work in a conversion project turning the site into a history museum and cultural center dedicated towards the preservation and promotion of Grainger County history.
