= William Michael Cocke =

American politician (1815–1896)

Member of the U.S. House of Representatives from Tennessee's 2nd district
- In office March 4, 1845 – March 3, 1849
- Preceded by: William Tandy Senter
- Succeeded by: Albert Galiton Watkins

Personal details
- Born: July 16, 1815 Rutledge, Tennessee, U.S.
- Died: February 6, 1896 (aged 80) Nashville, Tennessee, U.S.
- Party: Whig
- Spouses: Sarah Frances Cocke; Amanda Grigsby Cocke; Noel Cocke
- Children: William Michael Cocke, Jr.; Elisabeth T. Cocke; Charles Cocke; Sarah Frances Cocke; Emma Cocke; Ellis Cocke; Mary B. Cocke
- Education: East Tennessee College
- Profession: lawyer; Clerk; politician

William Michael Cocke (July 16, 1815 – February 6, 1896) was an American politician who represented Tennessee's second district in the United States House of Representatives.

== Biography ==
Cocke was born in Rutledge, Tennessee on July 16, 1815. He pursued classical studies and graduated from East Tennessee College at Knoxville, Tennessee. He studied law, was admitted to the bar, and practiced in Rutledge and Nashville. Cocke was Clerk of Grainger County Circuit Court from 1840 to 1845. He served as a member of the Tennessee House of Representatives.

On January 15, 1835, he married his first cousin, Sarah Frances Cocke, daughter of Willis and Margaret E. Rogers Cocke. They had seven children. There were no children by his second marriage to Amanda Grigsby, nor his third to Noel.

== Career ==
Cocke was elected as a Whig to the Twenty-ninth and Thirtieth Congresses. He served from March 4, 1845 to March 3, 1849. During the Thirtieth Congress, he was chairman of the U.S. House Committee on Revolutionary Pensions. He was not a candidate for re-election in 1848.

Elected to the State Senate, Cocke served from 1855 to 1857. Cocke served in the 31st General Assembly in the second session of 1855-1896, replacing Christopher Hitch, who had resigned; representing Anderson, Campbell, Claiborne, and Grainger counties as a Democrat. His uncle, John Cocke, also served as a member of the Tennessee general Assembly. From 1859 to 1865, he resided in Asheville, North Carolina. in about 1872, he moved to Lexington, Kentucky, and from there to Nashville, in Davidson County, Tennessee.

== Death ==
Cocke died in Nashville on February 6, 1896 (age 80 years, 205 days). He is interred at Mount Olivet Cemetery. He was the grandson of William Cocke and the nephew of John Alexander Cocke.

U.S. House of Representatives
Preceded by William T. Senter	Member of the U.S. House of Representatives from Tennessee's 2nd congressional district 1845-1849	Succeeded by Albert G. Watkins
