= Lea Springs =

- Formerly listed on the U.S. National Register of Historic Places
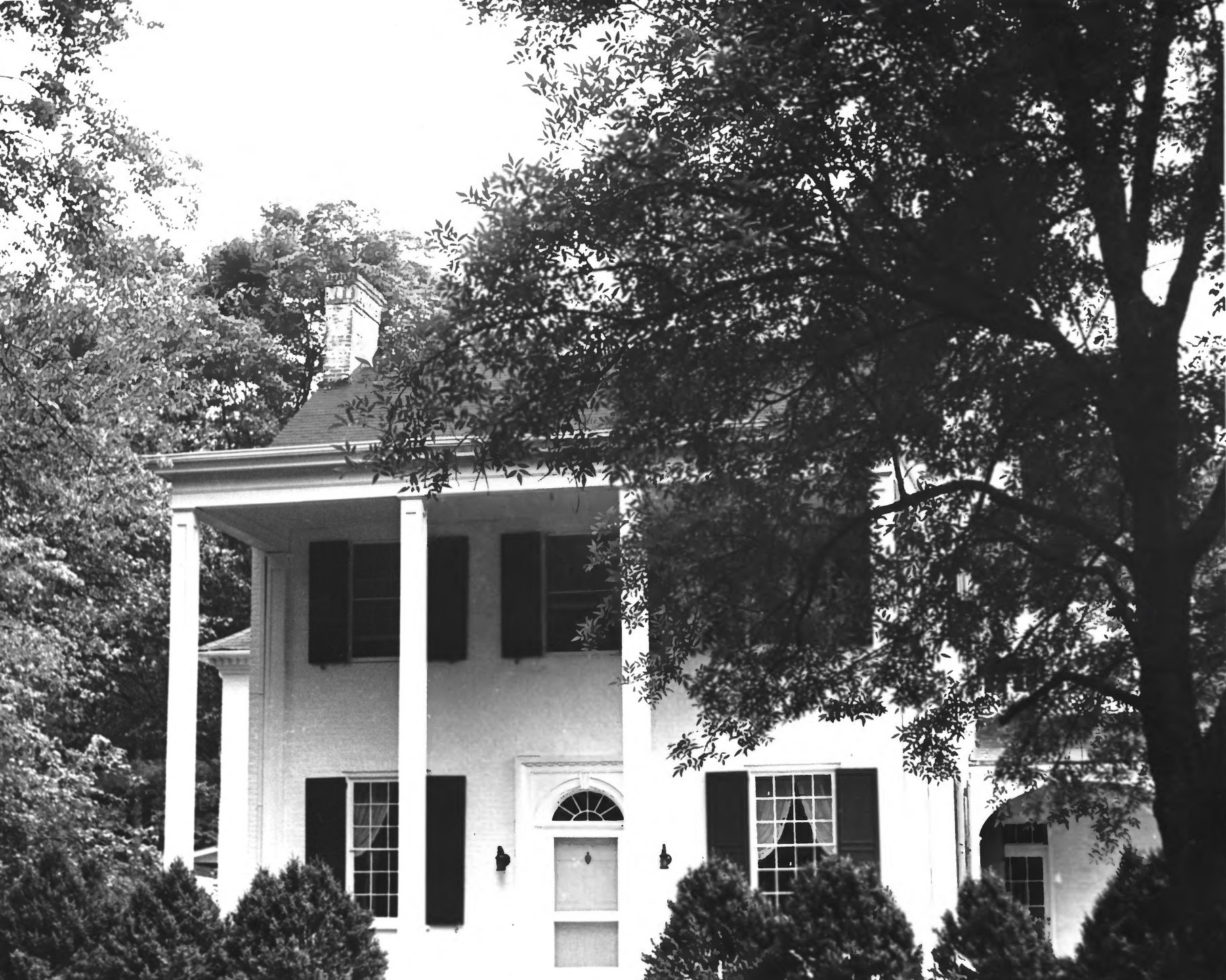
- Frontage view of Lea Springs

- Location within Tennessee Location within the United States
- Nearest city: Blaine, Tennessee
- Coordinates: 36°11′34″N 83°41′37″W
- Area: 9 acres (3.6 ha)
- Built: 1819
- Architectural style: Federal
- NRHP reference No.: 75001754

Significant dates
- Added to NRHP: May 29, 1975
- Removed from NRHP: June 20, 2023

Lea Springs was a historic mansion in Lea Springs, Tennessee near the city of Blaine, Tennessee. It was built by slaves in 1819 for Pryor Lea, who grew up at Richland. Lea became a politician in Tennessee and Texas, and he was a founding trustee of the University of Mississippi. He died in 1879, and the house was remodeled as a resort in the 1880s.

The house was designed in the Federal architectural style. It has been listed on the National Register of Historic Places since May 29, 1975. The mansion was demolished in 2008, and the property was delisted in 2023.
