= Blaine, Tennessee =

Knoxville suburb and city in Grainger County, Tennessee

Blaine, Tennessee formerly Blaine's Crossroads
- City
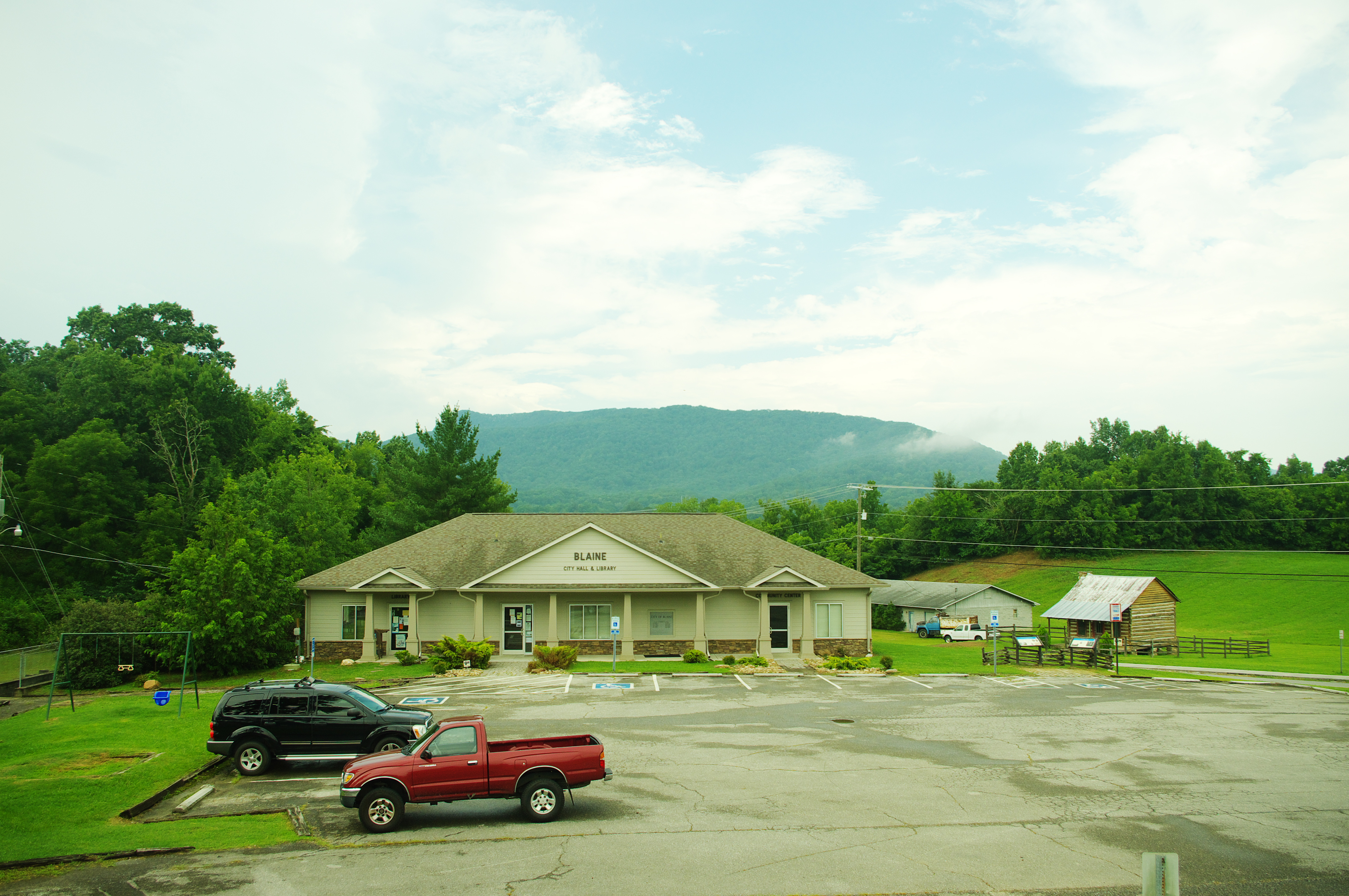
- Blaine City Hall and Library
- Motto: "The City With Determination"
- Location of Blaine in Grainger County, Tennessee.
- Coordinates: 36°9′3″N 83°42′2″W
- Country: United States
- State: Tennessee
- County: Grainger
- Incorporated: 1978
- Named for: Robert Blaine

Government
  - Type: Mayor-council
  - Mayor: Marvin Braden
  - Vice Mayor: Darrell Williams
  - City Council: List of Councilmen: Darrell Williams; Gabe Black; James Copeland; Earl Dunn; Michael Fennell; Michael Hopson; Patsy McElhaney; Charlie McKnight

Area
  - Total: 9.53 sq mi (24.69 km^{2})
  - Land: 9.52 sq mi (24.65 km^{2})
  - Water: 0.019 sq mi (0.05 km^{2})
- Elevation: 1,037 ft (316 m)

Population (2020)
  - Total: 2,084
  - Density: 219.0/sq mi (84.55/km^{2})
- Time zone: UTC-5 (Eastern (EST))
  - Summer (DST): UTC-4 (EDT)
- ZIP code: 37709
- Area code: 865
- FIPS code: 47-06340
- GNIS feature ID: 2403874
- Website: https://www.blainetn.gov/

Blaine, formerly known as Blaine's Crossroads, is a city in Grainger County, Tennessee, United States, and a suburb of neighboring Knoxville. It is part of both the Knoxville Metropolitan Statistical Area and the Morristown Metropolitan Statistical Area. The population was 2,084 at the 2020 census.

== History ==
Blaine was originally known as Blaine's Crossroads (sometimes spelled "Blain"). During the early 19th century, it was located at the intersection of several important roads, including the eastern terminus of the Emory Road (present day SR 61), which traversed northern Knox County, the northern terminus of Indian Ridge Road, and the Great Indian Warpath, present-day U.S. Route 11W. Shields' Station, a popular tavern and store, had been built in Blaine by the early 1830s. Blaine later served as a stop along the Knoxville and Bristol Railroad, also known as the Peavine Railroad, in the late 19th and early 20th centuries.

During the American Civil War, Blaine's Crossroads served as the site of retreat of Confederate forces following General James Longstreet's victory in the Battle of Bean's Station. Longstreet and his forces attempted to siege westward into Blaine's Crossroads, as part of the Knoxville campaign to capture the city of Knoxville. Union army forces retreating from Bean's Station moved into Blaine's Crossroads, making a stronger defense at the community for Union military forces. Overmatched by the strength of the Union Army, Longstreet and his forces retreated at Blaine's Crossroads, ending the Confederacy's attempt at controlling Knoxville.

Around 1890, a Pennsylvania native named Robert Blaine opened and operated a general store in the community. As the community grew, Blaine was chosen as the namesake of the city.

In the late 19th to the early 20th century, Blaine was a stop on the Knoxville and Bristol Railroad, commonly known by locals as the "Peavine Railroad." The line ran from the City of Morristown in Hamblen County, through the Richland Valley to the bedroom community of Corryton, north of Blaine in unincorporated Knox County. With the creation of the railroad, Blaine saw a significant change from a small turnpike town, to a bustling railroad town.

On December 31, 1952, country music singer Hank Williams was spotted during his last ride in Blaine following his departure from the Andrew Johnson Hotel in downtown Knoxville. Falling severely ill after a dinner at the hotel, Williams asked his driver, Charles Carr, drive him from Knoxville to Charleston, West Virginia for a concert in the same day. Arriving in Blaine, Williams' car was stopped by a Tennessee Highway Patrol trooper for speeding. The state trooper had seen Williams lying motionless in the back of the car during the stop and assumed that he was dead. Carr insisted that Williams was sedated from a Knoxville doctor's order. The trooper fined Carr $25 for speeding, and later paid this fine at the Grainger County Courthouse in Rutledge.

In 1978, waste management company Browning-Ferris Industries announced plans for a large sanitary landfill to service the needs of Knoxville in Blaine. The proposal would prompt community members to petition and vote to incorporate Blaine into a city in the same year. Blaine residents would also use acts of vandalism (notably arson) and violence against Browning-Ferris and construction companies contracted to build the landfill to oppose the project. The largest of these acts resulted in the destruction of the Knoxville office of Browning-Ferris via bomb, costing the company $50,000.

In 2007, the city received $520,560 in funding from the Economic Development Administration, and $867,600 towards developing the city's sewage treatment system for proposed commercial and industrial sites. The project created nearly 175 jobs in the city and the potential of $12.525 million in private investment. In 2010, the Blaine City Council moved forward with the sewer project despite previous hurdles with local opposition.

== Geography ==
Blaine is located in the southwest corner of Grainger County at 36°9′3″N 83°42′2″W (36.150854, -83.700443). It is situated around the intersection of U.S. Route 11W (Rutledge Pike), Tennessee State Route 61, and Indian Ridge Road. The city is southeast of the point where Grainger, Knox, and Union counties meet. Clinch Mountain and adjacent ridges rise prominently to the north and northeast, and House Mountain is visible to the southwest.

It is 14 miles (23 km) southwest of Rutledge, the county seat, 12 miles (19 km) southeast of Maynardville, and 19 miles (31 km) northeast of Knoxville. Blaine is connected to Knoxville and Rutledge via U.S. Route 11W and Maynardville via TN-61.

According to the United States Census Bureau, the city has a total area of 9.4 square miles (24.3 km^{2}), all of it land.

== Demographics ==
Historical population
Census	Pop.	Note	%±
1980	1,147		—
1990	1,326		15.6%
2000	1,585		19.5%
2010	1,856		17.1%
2020	2,084		12.3%

=== 2020 census ===
As of the 2020 census, there was a population of 2,084, with 825 households and 613 families residing in the city, and the median age was 41.8 years.

21.3% of residents were under the age of 18 and 15.9% of residents were 65 years of age or older. For every 100 females there were 103.5 males, and for every 100 females age 18 and over there were 100.9 males age 18 and over.

There were 825 households in Blaine, of which 31.4% had children under the age of 18 living in them. Of all households, 54.1% were married-couple households, 17.9% were households with a male householder and no spouse or partner present, and 21.5% were households with a female householder and no spouse or partner present. About 23.5% of all households were made up of individuals and 10.7% had someone living alone who was 65 years of age or older.

There were 893 housing units, of which 7.6% were vacant. The homeowner vacancy rate was 0.9% and the rental vacancy rate was 3.0%.

0.0% of residents lived in urban areas, while 100.0% lived in rural areas.

Racial composition as of the 2020 census
Race	Number	Percent
White	1,964	94.2%
Black or African American	20	1.0%
American Indian and Alaska Native	2	0.1%
Asian	7	0.3%
Native Hawaiian and Other Pacific Islander	1	0.0%
Some other race	18	0.9%
Two or more races	72	3.5%
Hispanic or Latino (of any race)	43	2.1%

=== 2000 census ===
As of the census of 2000, there were 1,585 people, 636 households, and 478 families residing in the town. The population density was 179.6 inhabitants per square mile (69.3/km^{2}). There were 680 housing units at an average density of 77.1 per square mile (29.8/km^{2}). The racial makeup of the town was 96.91% White, 1.07% African American, 0.32% Native American, 0.13% Asian, 0.63% from other races, and 0.95% from two or more races. Hispanic or Latino of any race were 1.01% of the population.

There were 636 households, out of which 31.4% had children under the age of 18 living with them, 60.2% were married couples living together, 10.4% had a female householder with no husband present, and 24.7% were non-families. 20.4% of all households were made up of individuals, and 5.2% had someone living alone who was 65 years of age or older. The average household size was 2.49 and the average family size was 2.87.

In the town, the population was spread out, with 22.5% under the age of 18, 9.5% from 18 to 24, 30.8% from 25 to 44, 26.4% from 45 to 64, and 10.8% who were 65 years of age or older. The median age was 37 years. For every 100 females, there were 95.2 males. For every 100 females age 18 and over, there were 95.2 males.

The median income for a household in the city was $30,677, and the median income for a family was $35,417. Males had a median income of $26,213 versus $20,707 for females. The per capita income for the city was $16,587. About 11.7% of families and 14.9% of the population were below the poverty line, including 19.9% of those under age 18 and 27.1% of those age 65 or over.

== Economy ==
In its retail and commercial markets, Blaine has a small amount of restaurants, stores and professional services. A Food City supermarket that opened in 2015, is the only grocery store in Blaine.

Economic growth and development has appeared to make significant gains in the city after the construction of sewage treatment plant on the easternmost part of the city near the unincorporated community of Lea Springs. Since the wastewater system project's completion in the early 2010s, Blaine has seen a massive boost in commercial development and population growth, both of which were contributed to the project, the planning of a business park site, and the city's proximity to Knoxville appealing to commuters.

== Arts and culture ==
=== Historic sites ===
- Lea Springs (located east of town in ZIP code)
- Richland
- Shields' Station
- Janeway Cabin
- Emory Road

== Government ==
Blaine uses the mayor-council system, which was established in 1978 when the city was incorporated. It is governed locally by a nine-member city council.

The citizens elect the mayor and eight council members to four-year terms. The board elects a vice mayor from among the eight council members.

=== List of mayors ===
List of mayors of Blaine, Tennessee
- J.W. Speegle, 1978-1980
- Eddie Earl, 1980-1982
- William Newman, 1982-1984
- Billy Freeman, 1984-1987
- W. Adrian Cameron, 1987-1989
- Eddie Hamilton, 1989-1993
- Vickie Vineyard, 1993-2005
- Patsy McElhaney, 2005–2018
- Marvin Braden, 2018–present

Blaine is represented in the 35th District of the Tennessee House of Representatives by Jerry Sexton, a Republican.

It is represented in the 8th District of the Tennessee Senate by Frank Niceley, also a Republican.

Blaine is represented in the United States House of Representatives by Republican Tim Burchett of the 2nd congressional district.

== Infrastructure ==
=== Utilities ===
Knoxville Utilities Board provides electricity to Blaine and parts of its outskirts inside the Blaine zip code, 37709.

Luttrell-Blaine-Corryton Utility District (LBCUD) provides municipal water services to Blaine.

The City of Blaine operates and owns its wastewater treatment system and plant, with the LBCUD contracted to perform the billing and collection for sewer services and its fees.

=== Transportation ===
All U.S. routes and state routes in Blaine are maintained by the Tennessee Department of Transportation (TDOT) in TDOT Region 1, which consists of 24 counties in East Tennessee. Streets, sidewalks, and greenways in the Blaine city limits are the City of Blaine Public Works Department.

==== Principal highways ====
- US 11W (Rutledge Pike)
- SR 1 (concurrent to US 11W)
- SR 61

==== Major surface routes ====
- Emory Road (Old SR 61)
- Indian Ridge Road
- Little Valley Road
- Old Rutledge Pike
- Richland Road
- Stoutown Road

== Notable people ==
- Gertrude Janeway (1909–2003), American Civil War widow
