= Richland (Blaine, Tennessee) =

Historic house in Tennessee, United States

- U.S. National Register of Historic Places
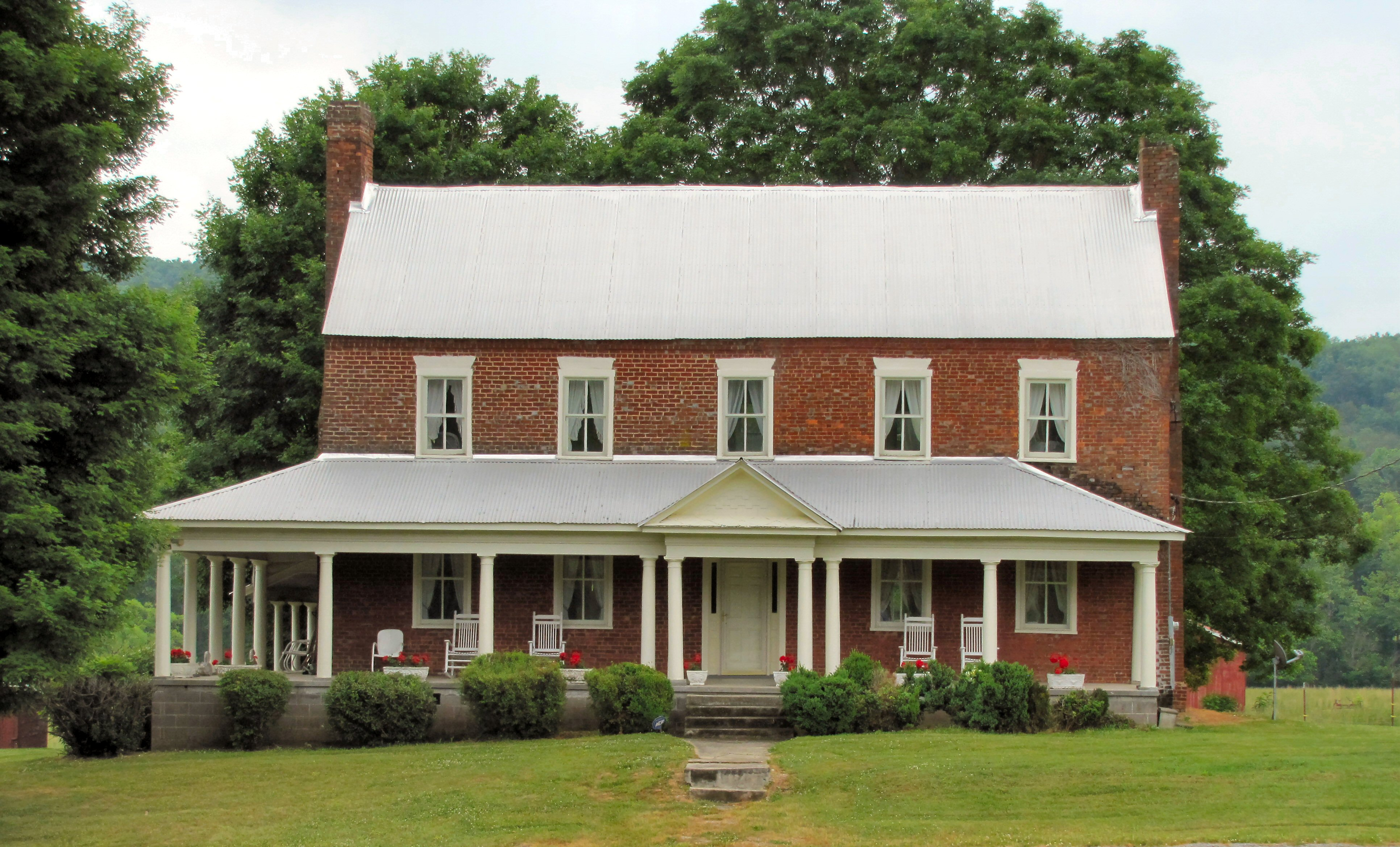
- Area: 77.13 acres (31.21 ha)
- Built: c. 1796
- Architectural style: Federal, Colonial Revival
- NRHP reference No.: 14000941
- Added to NRHP: November 19, 2014

Richland is a historic farmhouse in Blaine, Tennessee. It was built by slaves circa 1796 for Major Lea and his wife, Lavinia Jarnagin. They had 11 children, including Pryor Lea, who grew up on the farm and later lived at Lea Springs; he became a legislator in Tennessee and Texas. Another son, Albert Miller Lea, served as a major in the Confederate States Army during the American Civil War of 1861-1865 and later lived in Corsicana, Texas.

The house was designed in the Federal architectural style, with a Colonial Revival porch, completed in the 1930s. The concrete floor was added in the 1990s. The property has been listed on the National Register of Historic Places since November 19, 2014.
