= U.S. Route 25E =

Highway in Tennessee and Kentucky, United States

U.S. Route 25E
- US 25E highlighted in red

Route information
- Auxiliary route of US 25
- Maintained by KYTC, TDOT, and FHWA (Note: Since the Cumberland Gap Tunnel is an interstate facility, it is the responsibility of the FHWA to maintain the section of US 25E it carries. The FHWA contracts the maintenance work to Tunnel Management, Inc., of Vaughn and Melton Consulting Engineers.)
- Length: 112.8 mi (181.5 km)
- Existed: November 26, 1926–present
- Tourist routes: East Tennessee Crossing Byway

Major junctions
- South end: US 25 / US 25W / US 70 in Newport, TN
- I-81 in Morristown, TN; US 11E in Morristown, TN; US 11W in Bean Station, TN; SR 33 in Tazewell, TN; SR 63 in Harrogate, TN; US 58 at Cumberland Gap, TN; KY 74 in Middlesboro, KY; US 119 in Pineville, KY; KY 11 in Barbourville, KY; US 25 / US 25W in North Corbin, KY
- North end: I-75 / KY 770 in North Corbin, KY

Location
- Country: United States
- States: Tennessee, Kentucky
- Counties: TN: Cocke, Jefferson, Hamblen, Grainger, Claiborne; KY: Bell, Knox, Laurel

Highway system
- United States Numbered Highway System; List; Special; Divided
- Kentucky State Highway System; Interstate; US; State; Parkways
- Tennessee State Routes; Interstate; US; State
← US 25	KY	→ US 25W
← US 25	TN	→ US 25W

U.S. Route 25E (US 25E) is the eastern branch of US 25 from Newport, Tennessee, where US 25 splits into US 25E and US 25W, to North Corbin, Kentucky, where the two highways rejoin. The highway, however, continues as US 25E for roughly two miles (3.2 km) until it joins Interstate 75 (I-75) in the Laurel County community of North Corbin at exit 29. The highway serves the Appalachia regions of Kentucky's Cumberland Plateau and the Ridge-and-Valley section of East Tennessee, including the urbanized areas of Corbin and Middlesboro in Kentucky and Morristown in Tennessee.

US 25E follows the original pathway of early U.S. pioneer Daniel Boone's Wilderness Road, which contributed to the increased settlement of Appalachia given its access through the rugged Cumberland Gap. By 1815, the route became the first state-funded road in Tennessee and, in 1923, unsigned State Route 32 (SR 32) in the Tennessee State Route System in its statewide entirety. It would be recognized as part of the Dixie Highway, one of the earliest federal auto trails, in 1915. The route was officially established as US 25E with the creation of the U.S. Numbered Highway System in 1926.

By 1965, economic conditions in Appalachia remained dire, and the formation of the Appalachian Regional Commission (ARC) provided new incentive for US 25E as part of the Appalachian Development Highway System (ADHS), designated as Corridor S in Tennessee and partially as Corridor F in both Tennessee and Kentucky. Corridor S follows US 25E between I-81 in Morristown to SR 63 (Corridor F) in Harrogate, and Corridor F follows the route from SR 63 to US 119 in Pineville. With its role in the ADHS, US 25E was planned for improvements as a regional limited-access highway between I-75 and I-81.

Initial construction work began in both states around the 1960s and 1970s but was accelerated in the 1980s and 1990s with additional federal funding for the section of US 25E between I-75 and I-81 with its designation as a federal truck route in the Federal Highway Administration (FHWA)'s National Network by 1982 and as High-Priority Corridor 12 of the National Highway System by Congress in 1991 with the passing of the Intermodal Surface Transportation Efficiency Act (ITSEA). In 1996, the highway received national recognition with its realignment under the Cumberland Gap with the large-scale Cumberland Gap Tunnel project. Considered a civil engineering achievement, the tunnel is one of two in the entire U.S. that crosses state lines under a mountain.

US 25E serves as an arterial expressway for long-distance travelers and truckers connecting central Appalachia to the Great Lakes and Eastern Seaboard regions of the U.S. via access to I-75, I-81, and proximity to I-26 and I-40. Since the completion of the Cumberland Gap Tunnel in 1996, upgrades to freeway-grade standards have been planned and constructed for US 25E in both states to improve regional freight movement.

In 2009, all of US 25E in Tennessee, along with US 25 from Newport to the North Carolina state line, was designated as the East Tennessee Crossing Byway, a National Scenic Byway.

== Route description ==
US 25E is maintained by the Tennessee Department of Transportation (TDOT) and the Kentucky Transportation Cabinet (KYTC) in the sections located in their respective states. Both states also have access to federal funding through the FHWA and ARC, given US 25E's designation as High-Priority Corridor 12 from its terminus at I-75 in North Corbin, Kentucky, to I-81 in Morristown, Tennessee, and Appalachian Highway corridors F in Kentucky and Tennessee and S in Tennessee, respectively. In addition, the FHWA contracts the maintenance and operations of US 25E in the Cumberland Gap Tunnel to Tunnel Management, Inc., a subsidiary of Vaughn and Melton Consulting Engineers.

=== Tennessee ===
==== French Broad River region ====
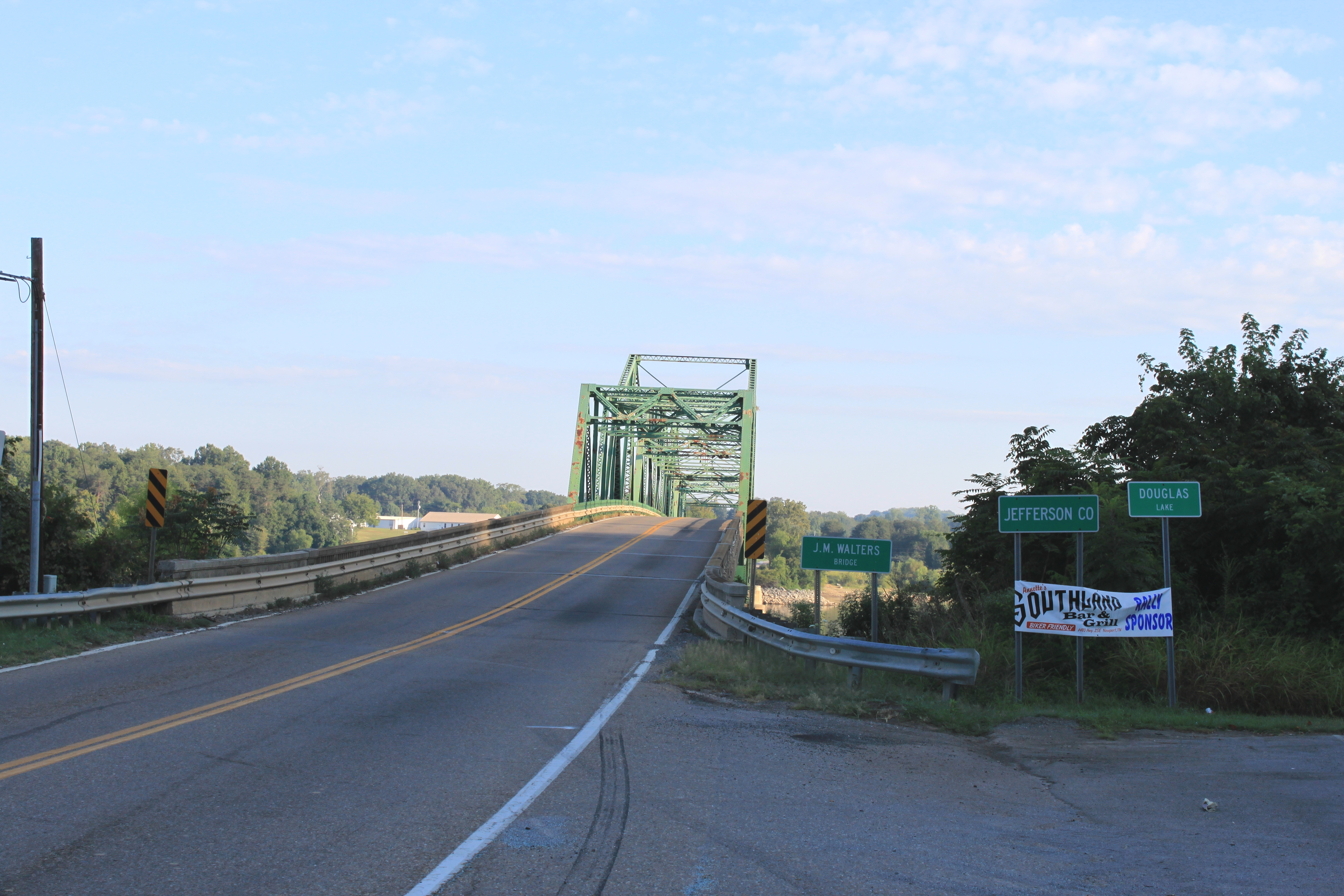
The old J.M. Walters truss bridge, which carried US 25E across the French Broad River, until its demolition and replacement in 2017

US 25E begins in the western portion of the city of Newport in Cocke County where it forks at the signalized northern terminus of US 25 alongside US 25W/US 70. Northbound US 25 and westbound US 70 leave Newport toward Dandridge concurrent with one another. From Newport, US 25E continues as two-lane primary highway, meets the under-construction Newport Bypass (SR 35/US 321), and enters unincorporated Cocke County through a rugged forested area near the community of Gum Spring approaching the Douglas Lake impoundment of the French Broad River. After briefly paralleling the eastern shoreline of the French Broad River at Webb Hollow, US 25E exits Cocke County as it crosses over the French Broad at the concrete bulb-T beam J.M. Walters Bridge at the McNabb Bluff rock ledge.

US 25E then enters Jefferson County northeast of the resort city of Baneberry, through a rural rolling corridor in the unincorporated community of Leadvale before entering the town limits of White Pine at SR 341 (Roy Messer Highway/Old Airport Road). In the town of White Pine, US 25E becomes State Street, the main thoroughfare in the town providing access to the town's residential areas and central business district. Exiting White Pine at Walnut Street, US 25E passes through farmland and connects to Walters State Community College (WSCC)'s Great Smoky Mountains Expo Center approaching I-81 at exit 8 near the Jefferson–Hamblen county line.

==== Morristown–Bean Station region ====
Entering Hamblen County, US 25E widens to a four-lane divided expressway at I-81 exit 8 and is designated ADHS Corridor S and the Davy Crockett Parkway. US 25E then enters the southernmost city limits of Morristown near the East Tennessee Progress Center industrial park at a signalized intersection. It passes through a highway exit-oriented commercialized corridor in the neighborhood of Witt, passing by Witt Elementary School and intersecting SR 343 (Newport Highway), a former alignment of US 25E. North of SR 343, US 25E traverses a rural commercial area and meets the western terminus of SR 113 (Spencer Hale Road). US 25E ascends the forested Bays Mountain ridge and becomes a freeway. It meets SR 160 (Governor Dewitt Clinton Senter Highway), a southern bypass route of Morristown at a partial cloverleaf interchange. US 25E then enters the central business district of Morristown, first accessing WSCC and College Square Mall at a split-single-point urban interchange at Walters State Community College Drive and Crockett Square Drive. Northbound, US 25E meets US 11E (Morris Boulevard) at its first partial cloverleaf interchange, sharing a brief concurrency with US 11E, until meeting another partial cloverleaf interchange where US 11E splits and heads eastbound as Andrew Johnson Highway. North of this interchange, US 25E downgrades to a limited-access four-lane highway along another exurban commercial corridor as it approaches the Hamblen–Grainger county line at the Cherokee Lake impoundment of the Holston River. Before exiting Morristown, US 25E has an incomplete interchange with SR 343 (Buffalo Trail) and signalized intersection at Cherokee Park Road, a local collector road to SR 343.

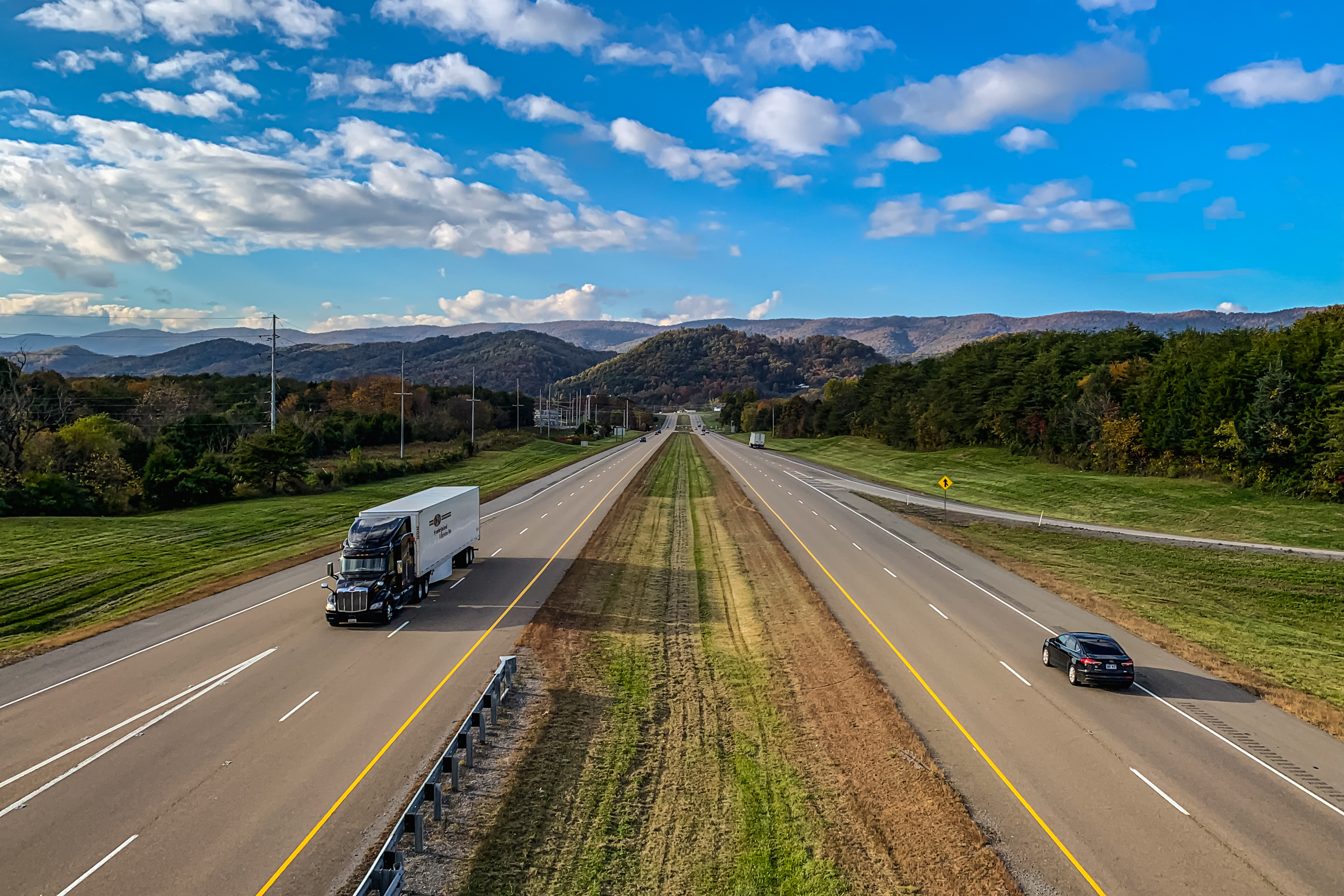
US 25E looking north toward Clinch Mountain in Bean Station

US 25E then crosses the Holston River at the steel stringer beam Olen R. Marshall Memorial Bridge, becoming Appalachian Highway. After this crossing, US 25E enters the town of Bean Station in Grainger County, passing by tourist-based commercial development along a peninsula on the Cherokee Reservoir shoreline near Johnson Ridge. Exiting the tourist area on a rock-fill embankment surrounded by the Cherokee Reservoir shoreline, the highway traverses Collins Ridge, passing by the Crosby Pothole Nature Refuge and is surrounded by Cherokee Reservoir on another rock-fill embankment, before approaching the restricted junctions of Broadway Drive, an old alignment of US 25E, and the northern terminus of SR 375. North of SR 375, US 25E becomes a freeway on a rock cut atop the Richland Knobs' Big Ridge, bypassing Bean Station's central business district to the west. Descending from the Big Ridge rock cut, US 25E meets US 11W at a trumpet interchange, beginning a short westbound concurrency with US 11W. US 25E/US 11W continues northwest, downgrading to a limited-access highway through a minor commercial district on its north and an impounded German Creek on its south in west Bean Station. Three miles (4.8 km) west of Bean Station at its town limits near Briar Fork Creek, US 25E splits from US 11W at an incomplete semi-directional T interchange near the southern base of Clinch Mountain, as US 11W heads westbound along the Richland Valley toward Knoxville. US 25E travels northbound through the Poor Valley ridge and ascends the southern slope of Clinch Mountain through a shale rock cut.

==== Clinch Mountain–Cumberland Gap region ====
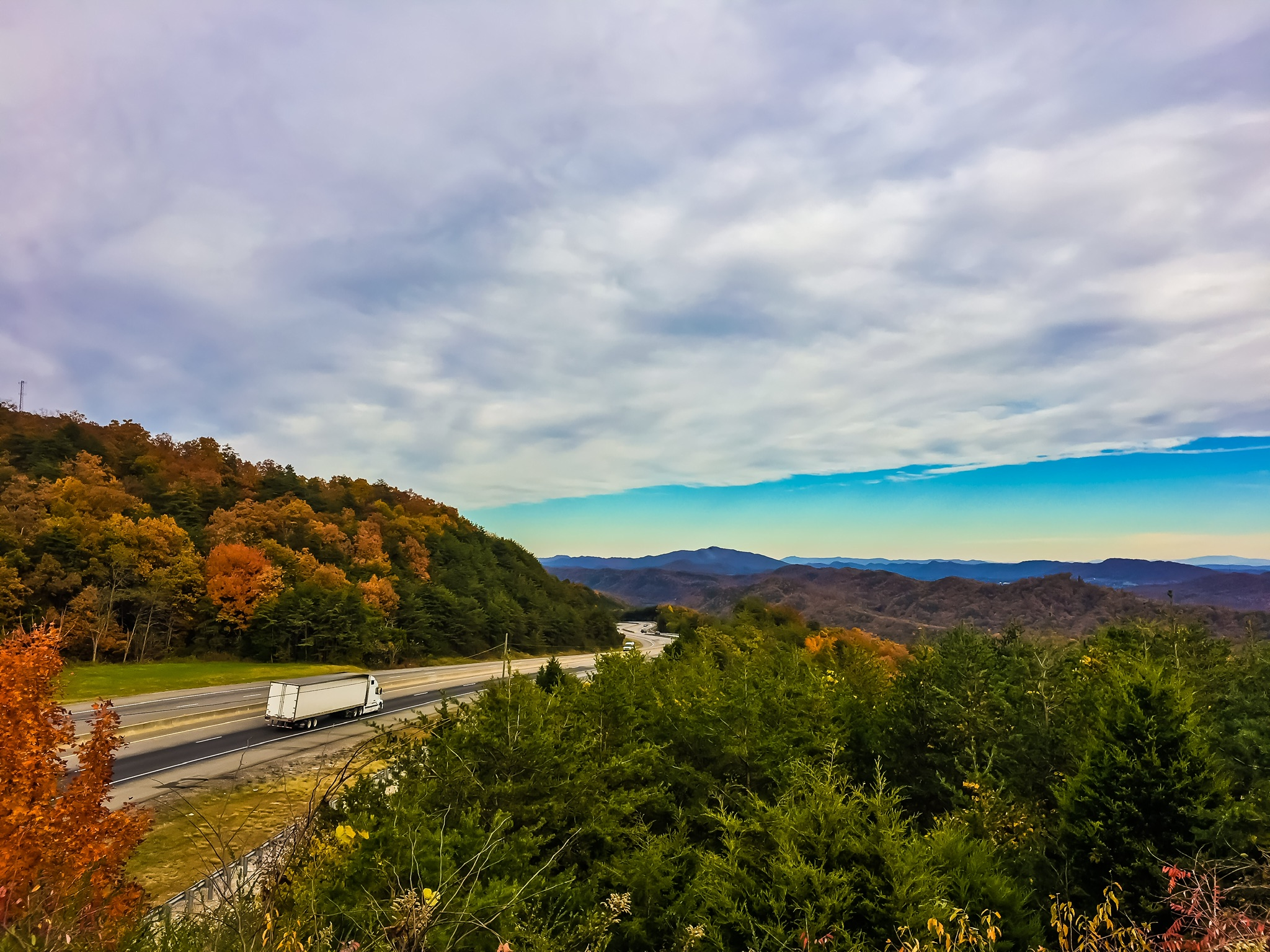
US 25E descending Clinch Mountain's southern slope toward Bean Station

US 25E then ascends northbound toward Bean Gap on top of Clinch Mountain, providing access to a scenic overlook of the Clinch Mountain valley, and then descends down the northern slope of Clinch Mountain, where it meets SR 131 at a restricted-offset intersection in the unincorporated community of Thorn Hill. North of Thorn Hill, US 25E traverses through the rugged forested Copper Ridge and Broken Valley area, passing by natural water springs and the former Imperial Tennessee marble quarry; approaching the pre-stressed box girder Indian Creek bridge. After crossing Indian Creek, US 25E enters the Dry Valley region adjacent to the Clinch River. US 25E briefly parallels the Clinch River on its west side and the Dry Valley rock bluff on its east before crossing the river once again at the Grainger–Claiborne county border via a multi-beam girder bridge.

Entering Claiborne County, US 25E winds through the forested and mountainous Caney Valley region and crosses the Norris Lake impoundment of Big Sycamore Creek on a stringer bridge. North of Big Sycamore Creek, US 25E has an intersection with eastbound SR 33, beginning a brief concurrency northbound toward the town of Tazewell. US 25E/SR 33 exits the Caney Valley region and enters the rural unincorporated community of Springdale, crossing over Little Sycamore Creek and passing by Springdale Elementary School and the Tazewell–Claiborne County Airport. North of Springdale, US 25E then ascends up Wallen Ridge passing by farmland and crosses over an old alignment of the road. After the overpass, the highway enters the southernmost town limits of Tazewell with access to Claiborne County High School but follows a J-shaped bypass around town's central business district. At the terminus of the bypass, US 25E splits from SR 33 in which the latter heads west toward Maynardville. US 25E heads north and immediately intersects SR 345 at its signalized eastern terminus. North of SR 345, US 25E follows a rural and commercialized corridor before exiting the northern city limits of Tazewell and enters a rugged rural corridor. It goes through a rock cut at Pine Hill, approaching the Powell River.

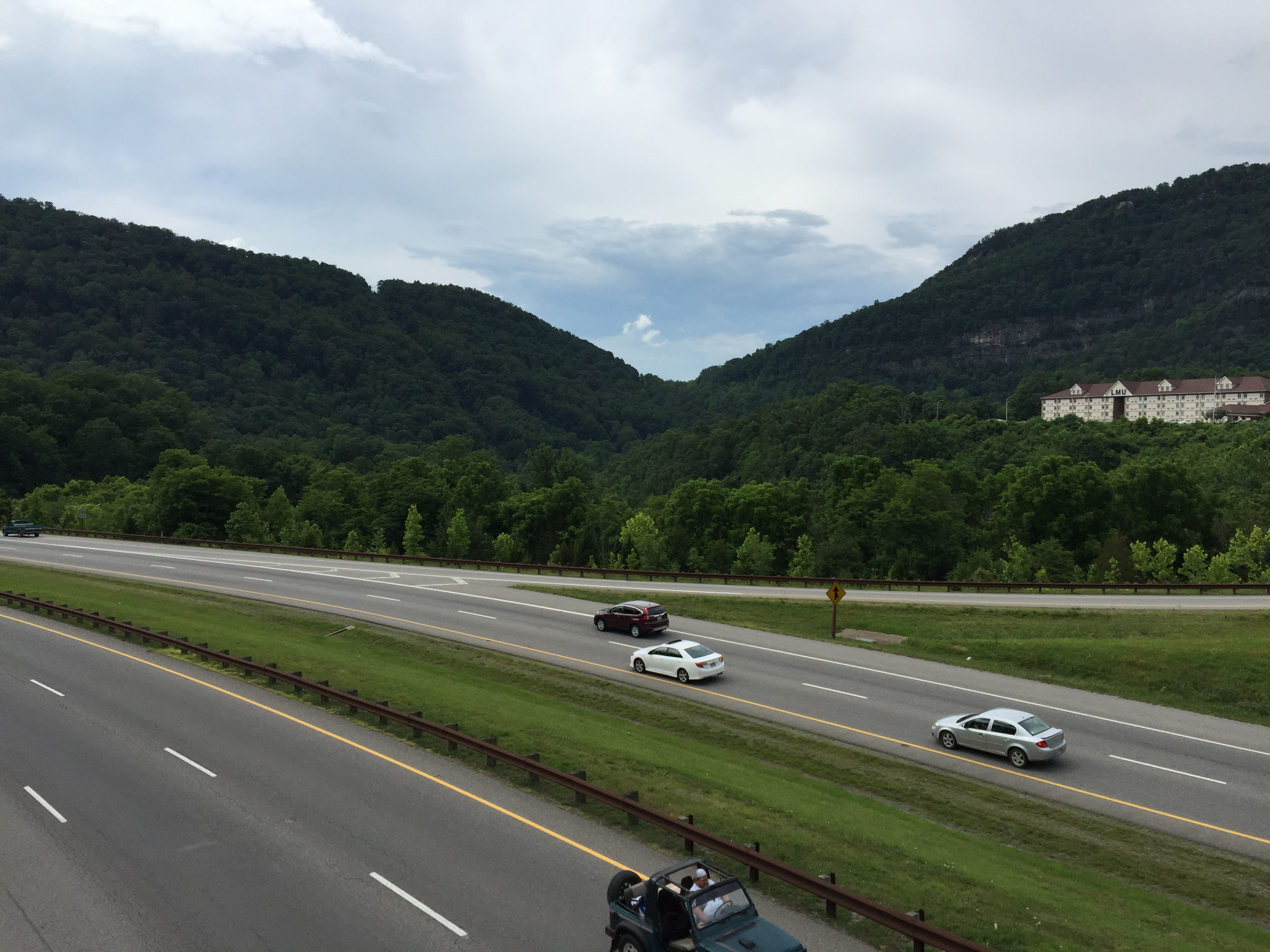
US 25E at the US 58 junction with the historic Cumberland Gap visible

US 25E then immediately enters the southern city limits of Harrogate after crossing the Powell River on a girder bridge, picking up the Cumberland Gap Parkway designation. In Harrogate, US 25E passes through another rock cut near the Powell River State Natural Reserve on the northern side of the Powell River. The highway intersects Patterson Road, an old alignment of US 25E. North of Patterson Road, US 25E traverses a rural-forested corridor, passing by TDOT's Claiborne County garage. It meets eastbound SR 63 at a signalized and commercialized intersection, beginning a minor concurrency along a commercial corridor before meeting westbound SR 63 (Corridor F) at another traffic signal near the corner of Lincoln Memorial University (LMU)'s campus and Harrogate City Park. North of the western SR 63 junction, US 25E remains adjacent to LMU's campus on the west, and Harrogate's central business district on the east with two signalized entrances to LMU. Exiting Harrogate, US 25E enters the town limits of Cumberland Gap and upgrades to a freeway at the base of the Cumberland Mountains. It then encounters the western terminus of US 58 at a trumpet interchange and begins its approach to the Cumberland Gap Tunnel at the base of the Cumberland Gap. Before entering the tunnel, US 25E overpasses Tiprell Road and the Knoxville Cumberland Gap Railroad. Entering the Cumberland Gap Tunnel, US 25E crosses the Tennessee–Kentucky state line near the tunnel's midway point and exits Tennessee as a four-lane freeway.

=== Kentucky ===
==== Cumberland Gap–Pine Mountain region ====
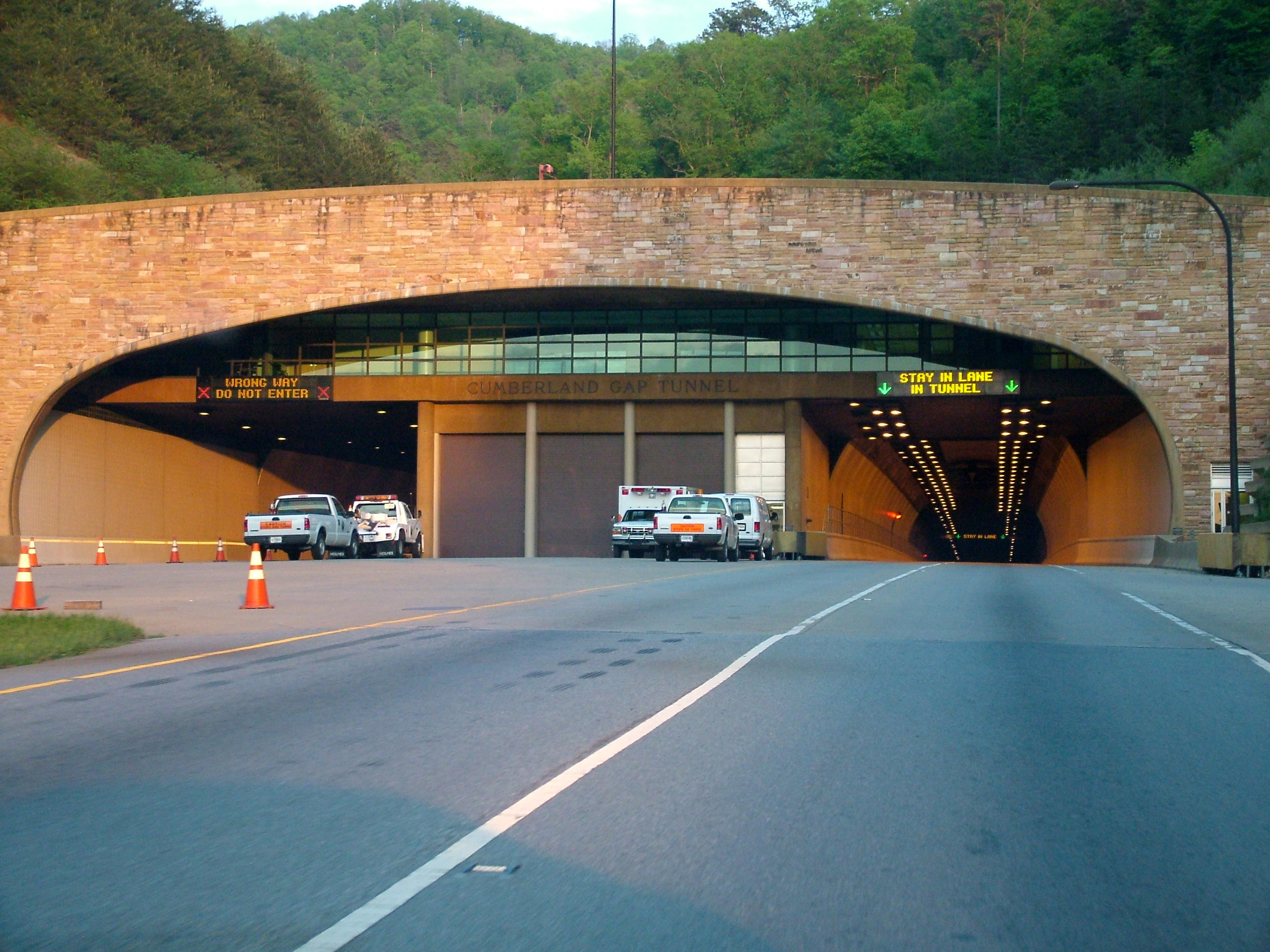
The Kentucky entrance of the Cumberland Gap Tunnel

Exiting the Cumberland Gap Tunnel and Tennessee, US 25E has a trumpet interchange with the entrance road for the Cumberland Gap National Historical Park before heading west to the city of Middlesboro in Bell County, where it downgrades to a four-lane highway, and intersects Kentucky Route 74 (KY 74). North of KY 74, US 25E continues through Middlesboro as North 12th Street, the main commercial thoroughfare, providing access to Middlesboro Mall and intersecting KY 441 before exiting northern Middlesboro's city limits, picking back up the Cumberland Gap Parkway designation for the rest of its duration in Kentucky. Between Middlesboro and the city of Pineville, US 25E travels through Kentucky Ridge State Forest/Pine Mountain State Resort Park in the Pine Mountain ridge and accesses Bell County High School. Entering the city limits of Pineville, US 25E meets US 119 (Corridor F). US 25E then becomes a horseshoe-shaped bypass of Pineville's central business district and intersects KY 66.

==== Barbourville–Cumberland River region ====
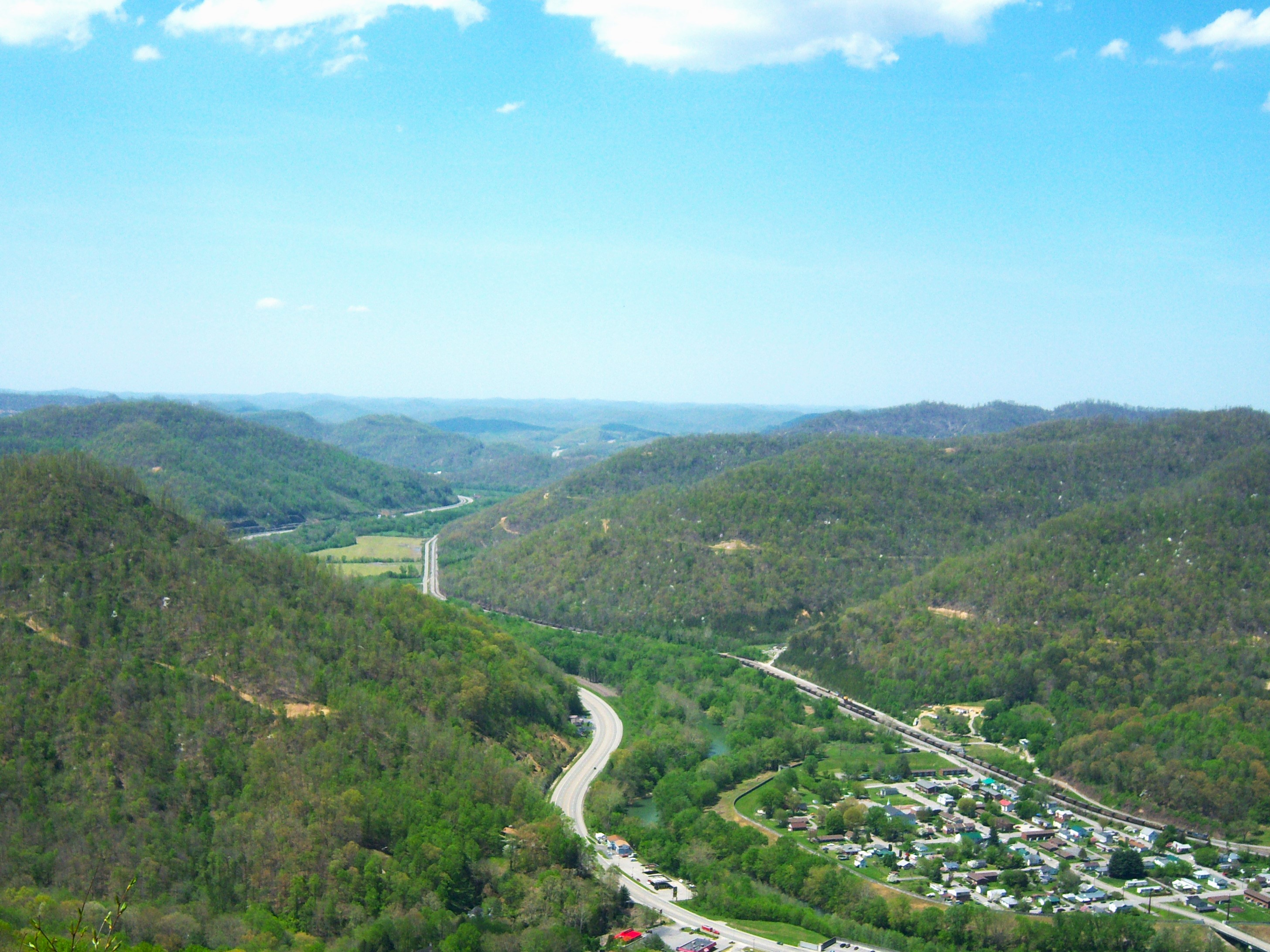
US 25E northbound, as seen from Pine Mountain

Approaching the rural community of Flat Lick, US 25E crosses the Cumberland River twice, enters Knox County, and intersects KY 92. In Flat Lick, US 25E meets KY 930 and KY 223. US 25E then makes an S-shaped curve, dipping south then turning back northwest as it approaches the city of Barbourville, designed originally as a bypass. Instead, the route serves as the city's major commercial corridor, providing access to Union College, and meeting KY 225 and KY 11. US 25E then enters a rugged forested area in the Cumberland Plateau near the unincorporated community of Baileys Switch. Between Baileys Switch and Gray, US 25E gradually turns more east–west and witnesses a transition from rugged forested land to rolling farmland.

==== Corbin–North Corbin region ====
Departing the rural community of Gray, the route's corridor begins transitioning from a rural setting to a more exurban-developed land-use as it approaches the conurbation of Corbin–North Corbin, with more consecutive signalized intersections with increased commercial development. US 25E then enters the city limits of Corbin at the northern terminus of KY 3041 (Corbin Bypass). Extending further east into a commercialized area of Corbin, the route also meets the northern terminus of KY 312. Past KY 312, the route then enters Laurel County and the unincorporated yet intensely developed community of North Corbin. US 25E then reunites with US 25W, and the unsuffixed US 25 at a heavily congestion intersection, dubbed by Kentucky transportation personnel as "Malfunction Junction", where US 25 continues north toward London. The US 25E designation, however, continues on an extension westbound to I-75, where it ends at exit 29. Overall, US 25E remains a multilane divided highway for its entire extent in Kentucky.

== History ==
=== Pioneer era ===
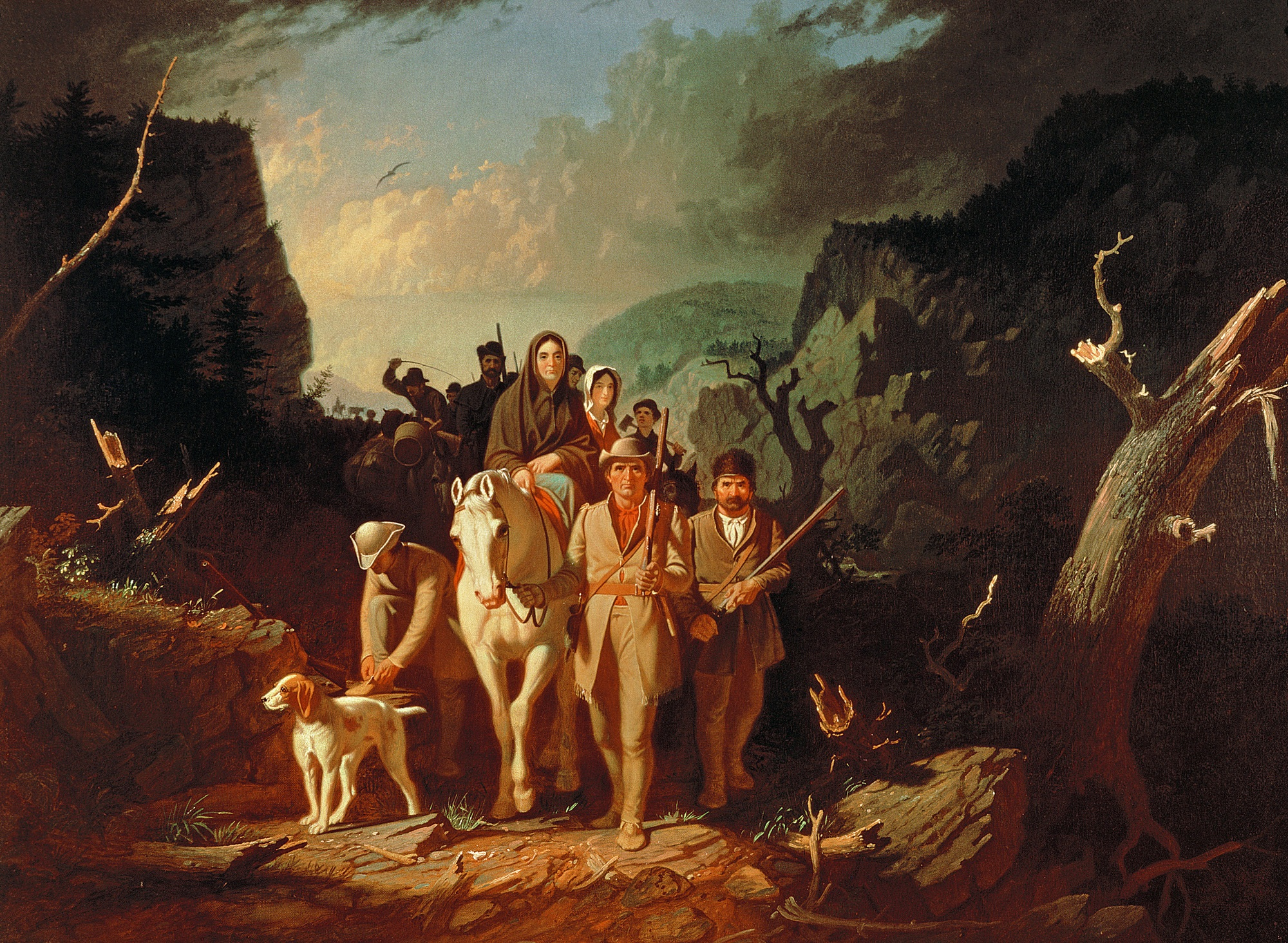
Daniel Boone guiding settlers through the Cumberland Gap on the Wilderness Road, the predecessor of US 25E

The route of US 25E was recorded to be first traversed by Native Americans, predominately the Cherokee people, long before the Appalachian region was settled by European pioneers. During this period, the route was considered a part of the Cherokee Warriors' Path. The pathway of US 25E was also known as the Buffalo Trail, named for a legend stating the path was formed from herds of buffalo traveling from Asheville, North Carolina, to the Powell River near the Cumberland Gap for the river's salt licks. Most notably, the pathway of the Corbin to Bean Station section of US 25E was utilized as famous pioneer and settler, Daniel Boone's Wilderness Road, being used for early interstate travel through the Cumberland Gap, aiding interstate travel in Appalachia. Among the early settlers using the Wilderness Road was William Bean, the recorded first European U.S. settler of the state of Tennessee. Bean would establish the outpost of Bean Station, which served as the new southern terminus of the Wilderness Road, in 1776. By 1821, the Tennessee section of the Wilderness Road from the Cumberland Gap to Bean Station would be established as the Bean Station Turnpike and would receive state funding while being a privately owned toll route due to its regional importance. From 1821 to 1915, the Bean Station Turnpike was overseen by an elected road commission that consisted of residents of Grainger and Claiborne counties.

=== Early auto travel and U.S. numbering ===
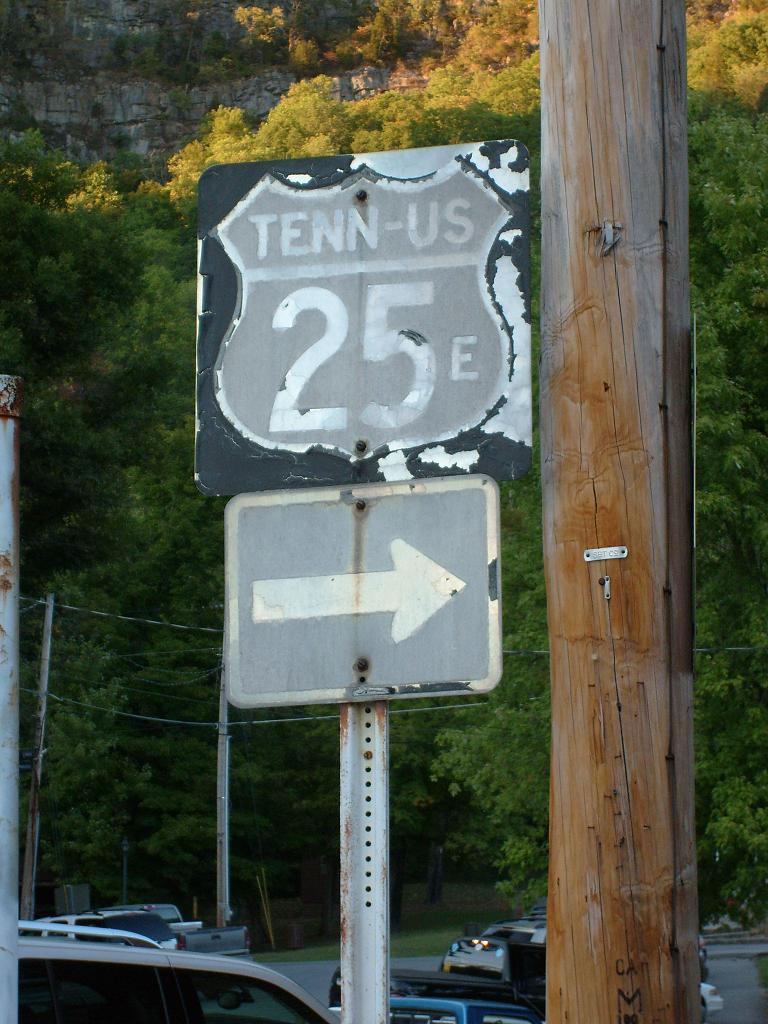
1926-era US 25E signage in downtown Cumberland Gap

In 1915, the initial Bean Station Turnpike, along with a southward extension to Morristown and the old Wilderness Road from Cumberland Gap to Corbin, was designated as part of the Dixie Highway, one of the first federal auto trails. These were among the earliest known national highways developed in the U.S. That same year, the Tennessee Department of Highways and Public Works, the predecessor agency to TDOT, was formed and tasked with establishing a state highway system. On October 1, 1923, the Tennessee section of the route was designated as SR 32 with the approval of the initial routes of the Tennessee State Route System.

The first portion in Tennessee to be paved was a section between Tazewell and Harrogate, which took place between 1918 and 1922. The 5.4-mile (8.7 km) section between White Pine and Morristown was paved between October 1935 and April 1936. Paving of the Jefferson County portion was completed in late 1936. By November 1926, concrete pavement on the portion of the route between Corbin and Barbourville in Kentucky was complete. In July 1928, all Dixie Highway signage on the route in Kentucky was removed and replaced with US 25E signage. All of US 25E was paved with asphalt, concrete, or treated macadam by the beginning of 1928. The route in Kentucky would be entirely paved by December 1934.

During the Prohibition era of 1920–1933, the route from the Cumberland Gap to Tazewell, along with SR 33 from Tazewell to Knoxville, was part of the infamous "Thunder Road", which was used by bootleggers to illegally transport and trade moonshine across state lines. The story was later fictionally adapted into a 1958 crime-drama film and song of the same name.

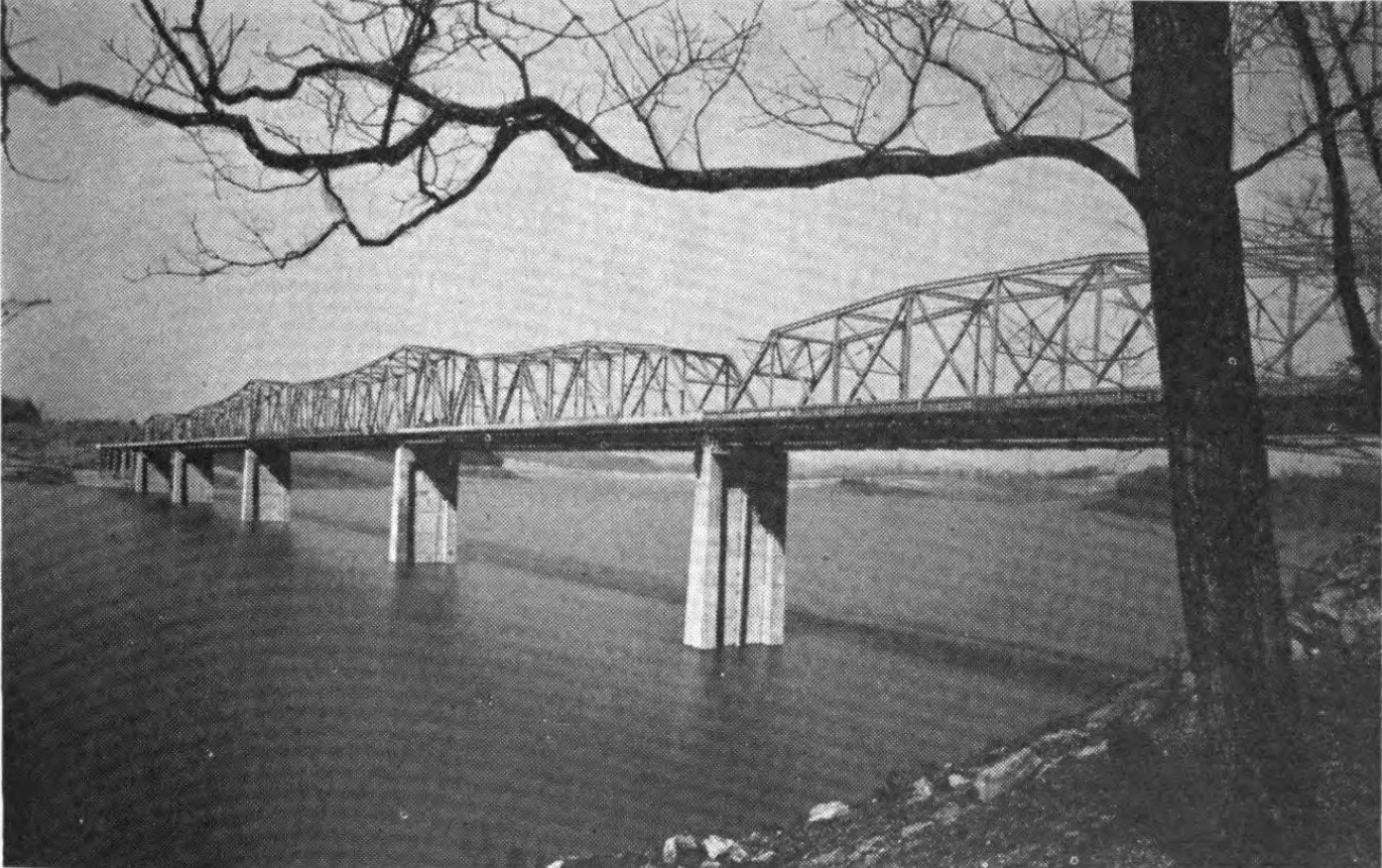
The old D.A. Green Bridge, constructed to carry US 25E after TVA's Cherokee Dam project in 1942

By 1936, the Clinch River Valley portion of US 25E was relocated and reconstructed to make way for the valley's inundation as part of the Norris Dam project by the Tennessee Valley Authority (TVA). This project included the construction of two concrete deck girder bridges at Big Sycamore Creek in Claiborne County and Indian Creek in Grainger County, respectively. This project, including the new bridges, cost TVA a total of $17,000 (equivalent to $308,850 in 2025).

In 1941, the Bean Station–Holston River section of US 25E was also relocated by TVA for its Cherokee Dam hydroelectric project near Jefferson City. TVA constructed a new truss bridge over the Holston River carrying US 25E between the Grainger and Hamblen county line and relocated US 25E east of its original intersection at US 11W in the old town of Bean Station, close to the Grainger and Hawkins county border. The reconstruction of US 25E would cost TVA $871,600 (equivalent to $14.7 million in 2025) and an additional $602,500 (equivalent to $10.2 million in 2025) for the Holston River bridge between Bean Station and Morristown.

US 25E between Middlesboro and the Cumberland Gap was reconstructed to add a truck climbing lane in 1953. In November 1955, KYTC announced a $3-billion (equivalent to $28.1 billion in 2025) 20-year comprehensive plan for statewide roadway improvements, including a proposal for US 25E to become a four-lane median divided limited-access highway for its entire length in the state. In December 1958, a 5.2-mile (8.4 km) relocation of US 25E in Kentucky from Barbourville northbound to Garrich (six miles [9.7 km] west of Gray) was awarded to Oman Construction of Nashville for a cost of $2.297 million (equivalent to $19.6 million in 2025). Relocation work on a five-mile (8.0 km) section south of Barbourville to Bimble was announced in 1962.

=== Upgrades to support Appalachian freight movement ===
With the increased use of the corridor, many portions of US 25E gradually became deficient, leading to plans for its widening and relocation. In 1965, the US 25E corridor from the proposed I-75 in North Corbin to the proposed I-81 in Morristown was proposed as Corridor S of the ADHS, which was created by the Appalachian Regional Development Act that year. Kentucky officials asked for the designation in Kentucky to be removed, with Corridor S only designated on US 25E in Tennessee.

==== Interstate Highway System ====
In the same year, then Kentucky Governor Ned Breathitt announced a two-mile (3.2 km) four-lane extension of US 25E, coined the "US 25 Connector", from its terminus from its conjunction into US 25 with US 25W in Corbin, to the under-construction I-75 at a diamond interchange to provide better access to Middlesboro and entering Tennessee. This extension was completed by 1970. US 25E was also reconstructed to a four-lane with a partial cloverleaf interchange at I-81 near the Witt area of Hamblen County south of Morristown in Tennessee. The contract to construct the related section of I-81 between the southern terminus with I-40 and US 25E near Morristown was awarded in June 1964 and completed in December 1966, along with the connecting section of I-40.

==== Clinch Mountain cut and geological difficulties ====
For the Clinch Mountain section of US 25E, TDOT engineers finalized two design alternatives, a dual-bore tunnel through the mountain which reduced environmental impacts to the landscape, or a deep cut along the mountain slope providing scenic views of the Clinch Mountain ridge. Citing the high cost of the tunnel proposal and local business opposition, TDOT decided on a deep cut. On September 13, 1976, work began on the 3.4-mile (5.5 km) section between the southern foot and the summit of Clinch Mountain. Work on the five-mile (8.0 km) connecting section from the summit to south of the Clinch River began in early 1977. Both projects ran into extensive geological problems, which delayed their completion, and increased the cost of the first contract from an initial bid amount of $5.1 million to $10 million. (equivalent to $21.1 million to $41.4 million in 2025). The project between US 11W at Bean Station and the gap at Clinch Mountain was completed in July 1980. The project south of the Clinch River to the gap at Clinch Mountain included plans for a grade-separated interchange at SR 131 in Thorn Hill, but the interchange project was removed from final construction.

==== Cumberland Gap bypass ====
In 1969, construction work on a 13-mile (21 km) four-lane bypass around the town of Cumberland Gap from the terminus of US 58 to north of the Powell River bridge in Harrogate started. By 1976, the work on this section in Claiborne County and part of Virginia was complete.

==== Morristown Bypass project ====
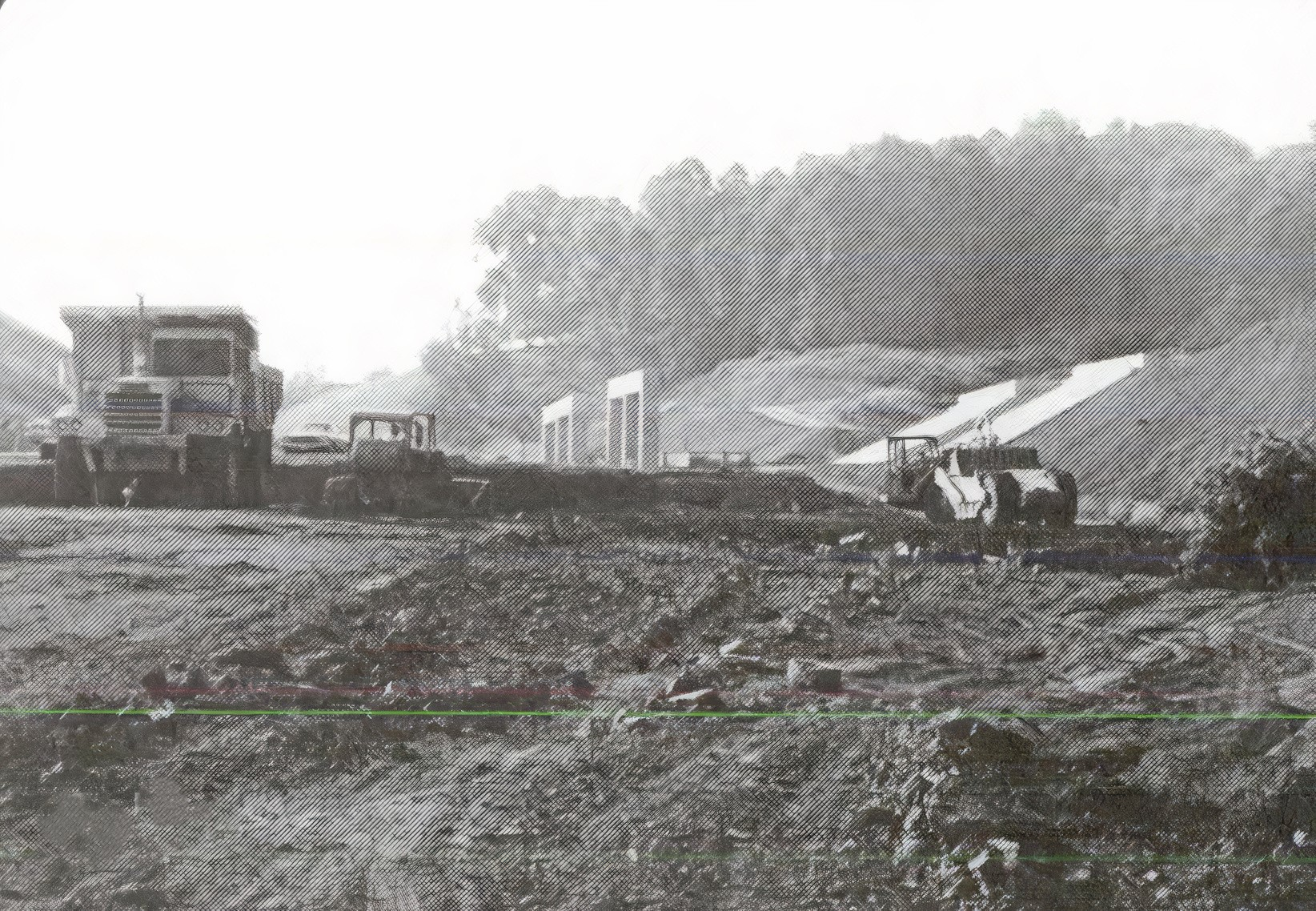
Construction on the Morristown Bypass section of US 25E at SR 160, 1976

Citing congestion and increased heavy truck traffic on Cumberland Street/Buffalo Trail, the existing alignment of US 25E through Morristown's downtown and central business district was highlighted for replacement with a new four-lane partial-controlled access highway known as the Morristown Bypass to remove heavy truck traffic through downtown Morristown as part of the ADHS plan.

Construction work on the four-lane Morristown Bypass from I-81 exit 8 to south of the Holston River started by June 1973. In the Morristown Bypass, US 25E was realigned east of its original alignment through Morristown's central business district. Four interchanges were constructed, including a partial cloverleaf interchange at SR 160, two partial cloverleaf interchanges at US 11E (East Morris Boulevard and Andrew Johnson Highway), and an incomplete half-Y interchange at Buffalo Trail, US 25E's then existing alignment. The Morristown Bypass was completed by 1977. By the completion of the Morristown Bypass, a new bridge over the Holston River between Bean Station and Morristown was announced for construction bids, at a preliminary cost of $8.25 million (equivalent to $34.2 million in 2025) for the new four-lane bridge alone. The new bridge would be complete by 1980.

==== Pineville Bypass and other Kentucky construction projects ====
In 1977, KYTC finalized designs of a 2.2-mile-long (3.5 km) four-lane bypass for US 25E paralleling the Cumberland River in Pineville, supported by a floodwall. By this time, US 25E in Kentucky had been widened to four lanes in several sections; Corbin to west Barbourville and south to Middlesboro. US 25E in its entirety in Kentucky would be widened to a four-lane expressway by late 1993 to early 1994 to prepare for the Cumberland Gap Tunnel's completion.

Tennessee transportation personnel proposed plans in 1979 to rename US 25E to US 25, as US 25W had largely paralleled or was concurrent to the I-75 corridor. The plan, however, was dismissed following dissent from Kentucky officials.

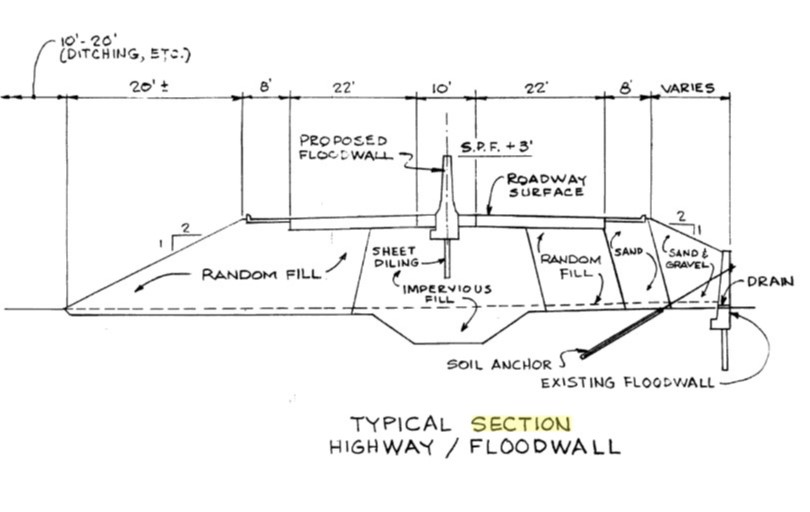
Cross-section of the relocated US 25E (Pineville Bypass) project, 1982

Throughout the 1970s to the 1990s, highway improvement projects conducted by a joint-effort between TDOT, the FHWA, and ARC began to widen US 25E between the town of Cumberland Gap to I-81 south of the city of Morristown into a limited-access and partial controlled-access highway. Transportation and engineering personnel in Kentucky would widen the route from I-75 to the city of Middlesboro in preparation of the Cumberland Gap Tunnel project.

==== Holston River and Bean Station bypass ====
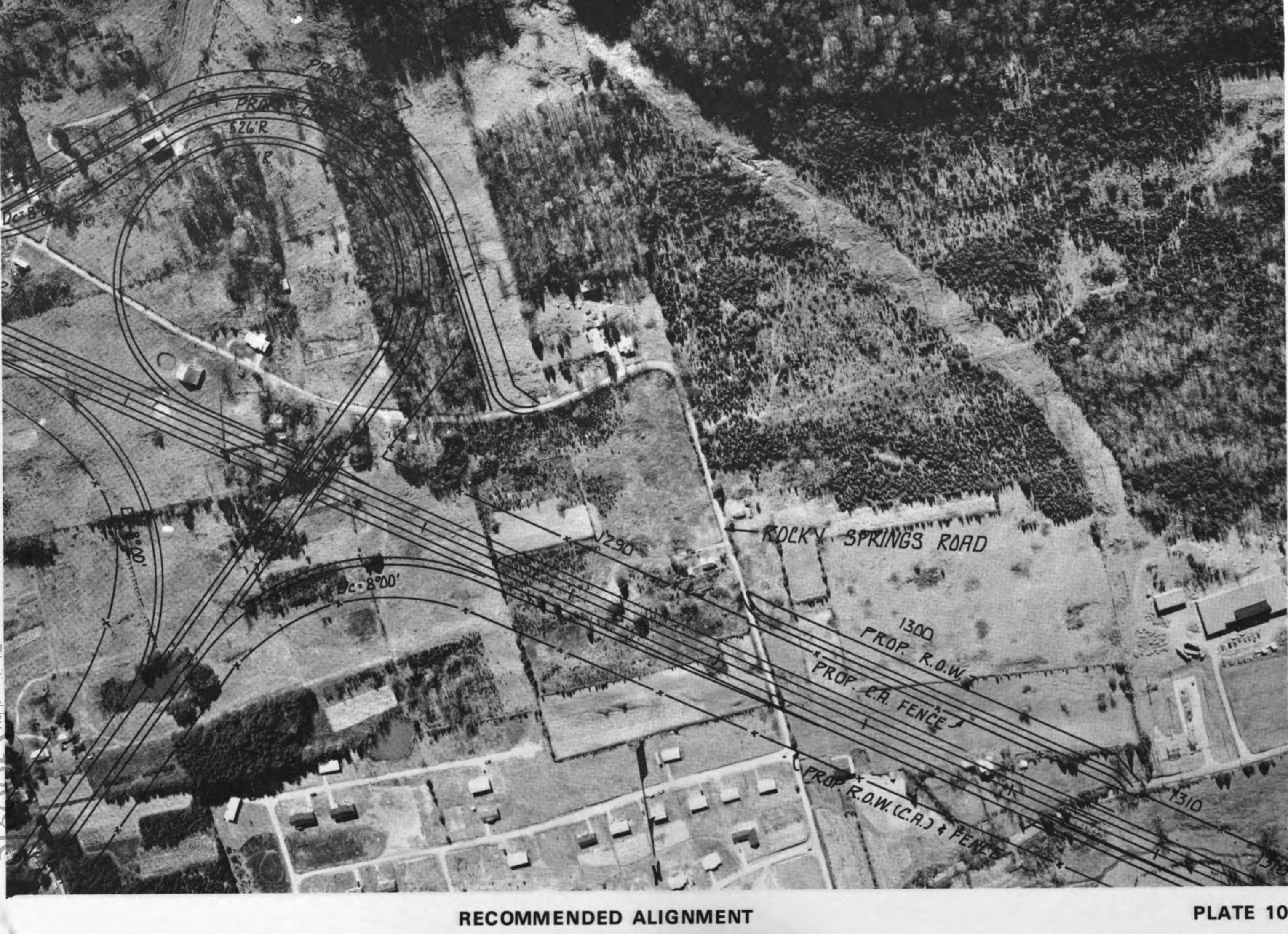
Preliminary design of a trumpet interchange at US 11W for the Holston River to Bean Station US 25E project, July 1981

In 1986, funding for the widening of US 25E into a four-lane limited-access highway from US 11W at Bean Station to the Holston River Bridge at Morristown would be funded through then Governor Lamar Alexander's Bicentennial Parkway Trust Fund, which was supported through increased gas taxes. Construction work on the 4.5-mile-long (7.2 km) section, in coordination with the widening of US 11W between US 25E at Bean Station and an existing four-lane section was complete by the end of 1990. Construction work started on a new alignment for US 25E from the realigned US 11W to the southern base of Clinch Mountain by 1995. It was completed in 1998 with a trumpet interchange at the eastern concurrency terminus of US 11W with an incomplete interchange at the western concurrency terminus of US 11W, with two new bridges at Briar Fork Creek for US 11W westbound towards Knoxville.

With the signing of ISTEA in 1991, the US 25E corridor from I-75 at Corbin to I-81 at Morristown was designated as High-Priority Corridor 12, making it as part of the National Highway System. With ISTEA, any future projects on the corridor of US 25E became eligible to federal funding up to 80 percent, with the states of Tennessee and Kentucky having to provide the remaining 20 percent.

==== Clinch River Valley and Tazewell Bypass ====
By 1992, funding for the survey and design of US 25E between Tazewell and the Springdale community in Claiborne County was allocated by Governor Ned McWherter's state budget. In 1994, TDOT would announce a multi-stage plan to widen and relocate a 18.2-mile-long (29.3 km) section US 25E between Thorn Hill in Grainger County to south of Harrogate in Claiborne County to prepare for the completion of the Cumberland Gap Tunnel. The project would be split into four sections, from north of Indian Creek to the Clinch River in Grainger County, from the Clinch River to south of Tazewell, a 0.9-mile (1.4 km) bypass around Tazewell until Anders Street, and from Anders Street to an existing four-lane section south of Harrogate.

Before the completion of the Cumberland Gap Tunnel, US 25E saw increased congestion following an uptick in truck traffic bypassing I-75 through Campbell County and Knoxville. The route is considered an alternate corridor of I-75 attractive to commuters to regional metropolises such as Morristown and Corbin–North Corbin and truckers alike connecting to I-81 and I-75, bypassing the congested stretch of I-75 in Knoxville and the stretch north of Knoxville through the Cumberland Mountains, which is prone to rockslides.

=== Cumberland Gap Tunnel project ===
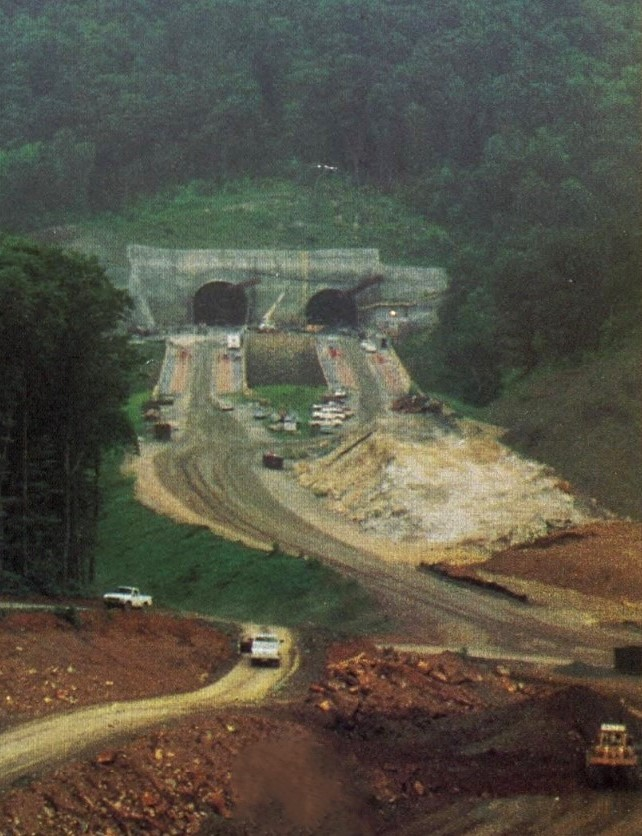
Earthworks for US 25E northbound approaching the Tennessee entrance of the Cumberland Gap Tunnel.

In the mid-to-late 20th century, US 25E between Middlesboro and Cumberland Gap had seen an uptick in fatal collisions, with the stretch of highway through the Cumberland Gap nicknamed "Massacre Mountain". In a 1985 report published by the U.S. Department of the Interior regarding US 25E through the gap, KYTC reported 239 collisions with 19 fatalities between 1967 and 1978 between Middlesboro and the Virginia state line. The Virginia Department of Transportation (VDOT) would report 42 accidents with one fatality between the Tennessee and Kentucky state lines from 1953 to 1977 in the same report. In 1973, officials with the National Park Service (NPS) received initiatives to construct tunnels underneath the Cumberland Gap in order to resolve the accidents and restore the Cumberland Gap to its pioneer-era state of the 1770s, a motion set forth by the establishment of the Cumberland Gap National Historical Park by Congress in 1940. The plan, consisting of the construction of twin 4,600-foot-long (1,400 m) tunnels, five miles (8.0 km) of new a four-lane controlled-access US 25E, two interchanges, seven bridges, and the restoration of the Cumberland Gap, was presented with a cost of $265 million (equivalent to $1.46 billion in 2025) and was led by joint effort between the NPS and FHWA. Design work for the project started in 1979, and construction on the tunnels and the new four-lane US 25E began in 1985.

The Cumberland Gap Tunnel would open in 1996, completely bypassing Cumberland Gap and Virginia. US 58 was moved to a new alignment along a short stretch of old US 25E to meet the new four-lane US 25E in Tennessee, decommissioning US 25E entirely in Virginia. As the remainder of old US 25E through Virginia and Kentucky lay within the boundaries of the Cumberland Gap National Historical Park, its pavement was torn up and the path was restored into a hiking trail along the Wilderness Road through the Cumberland Gap.

==== Post-tunnel improvements ====
Preliminary geometric design of a split single-point urban interchange in Morristown near WSCC. This reconstruction removed two signalized intersections on US 25E to improve traffic flow.

Since the 2000s, congestion from truck and commuter traffic and the issue of access control has brought several projects in Tennessee and Kentucky on upgrading US 25E up to Interstate Highway standards. Kentucky transportation officials cited the route as a "travel corridor the Eastern Seaboard (via connection to Interstate 40 and Interstate 81 in Tennessee) for through traffic".

Construction work on a new split single-point urban interchange at College Park Drive near WSCC for US 25E started in Morristown on September 2, 2011, by general contractor Summers-Taylor, Inc., of Elizabethton. The project, consisting of lowering the grade of US 25E, constructing two frontage roads and three bridges, was completed on October 24, 2015, at a cost of $17.28 million (equivalent to $22.9 million in 2025).

Between September 2011 and June 2014, US 25E at I-81 exit 8 was modified in a project that replaced the southbound loop onramp with a traditional diamond bridge ramp, widened the radius of the northbound loop exit ramp, replaced the US 25E overpass with a four-lane bridge, and added turn lanes at the intersections with the ramps. This project was necessitated by the hazardous conditions of the previous two-lane configuration, and the adoption of US 25E as part of an alternate route to I-75.

In 2017, design work started on an intersection relocation project of SR 131 near Thorn Hill in Grainger County at US 25E, which shifted the eastern and western junctions of SR 131 north and south of each other, respectively. The project was completed in July 2021 by contractor Charles Blalock and Sons, Inc., at a bid price of $3.98 million.

In February 2018, KYTC started work on a widening and access management project on US 25E between the US 25/US 25W terminus and the intersection at KY 3041 (Corbin Bypass). With a cost of $8.8 million (equivalent to $10.8 million in 2025), the project consisted of the removal of existing traffic lights and being replaced with restricted J-turn intersections, new frontage roads, and the widening of US 25E from four to six lanes, being completed in 2020.

As of 2013, 26.5 miles (42.6 km) has been completed of Corridor S along US 25E, while 22.2 miles (35.7 km) remains to be constructed, which consists of rest areas and design and construction of interchanges to meet Interstate Highway standards along the stretch of US 25E-labeled corridors F and S.

== Major intersections ==
State	County	Location	mi	km	Exit	Destinations	Notes
Tennessee	Cocke	Newport	0.0	0.0		US 25 south / US 25W north / US 70 (W Broadway Street/SR 9/SR 32 south/SR 35) to I-40 – Newport, Dandridge, Sevierville	Southern terminus of US 25E; US 25E south and US 25W merge to form US 25; southern end of unsigned SR 32 concurrency
Tennessee	Douglas Lake/French Broad River				J. W. Walters Bridge		
Tennessee	Jefferson					Nina Road – Baneberry	Access road into Baneberry
Tennessee	Jefferson	White Pine	9.5	15.3		SR 341 west (Old Airport Road) – Talbott	Eastern terminus of SR 341
Tennessee	Jefferson	White Pine	11.1	17.9		SR 113 south (Main Street) – Dandridge	Southern end of SR 113 concurrency
Tennessee	Hamblen	Morristown	13.0	20.9		I-81 – Knoxville, Bristol	I-81 exit 8, southern end of ADHS Corridor S and NHS Corridor 12 concurrency
Tennessee	Hamblen	Morristown	14.8	23.8		SR 343 north (Newport Highway) – Downtown	Southern terminus of SR 343
Tennessee	Hamblen	Morristown	15.5	24.9		SR 113 north – Whitesburg	Northern end of SR 113 concurrency
Tennessee	Hamblen	Morristown	17.1	27.5	1	SR 160 (Enka Highway)	Southern end of freeway; interchange
Tennessee	Hamblen	Morristown	19	31	1A	Crockett Square Drive/Walters State CC Drive	Interchange
Tennessee	Hamblen	Morristown	19.5	31.4	2A	US 11E south (Morris Boulevard/SR 34 west) – Morristown	Southern end of US 11E/SR 34 concurrency; interchange
Tennessee	Hamblen	Morristown	19.8	31.9	2B	US 11E north (East A.J. Highway/SR 34 east/SR 66) – Greeneville, Morristown	Northern end of US 11E/SR 34 concurrency; northern end of freeway; interchange
Tennessee	Hamblen	Morristown				Dalton Ford Road	Proposed interchange (unfunded)
Tennessee	Hamblen	Morristown				Brights Pike	Proposed interchange (unfunded)
Tennessee	Hamblen	Morristown	22.3	35.9		SR 343 south (Buffalo Trail) – Morristown Central Business District	Interchange; northern terminus of SR 343; southbound exit and northbound entrance; missing movements signed on Cherokee Park Road
Tennessee	Cherokee Lake/Holston River				Olen R. Marshall Memorial Bridge		
Tennessee	Grainger	Bean Station	26.2	42.2		SR 375 south (Lakeshore Drive S) – Cherokee	Northern terminus of SR 375; southern end of freeway
Tennessee	Grainger	Bean Station	29.3	47.2		US 11W north (SR 1 east) – Rogersville	Southern end of US 11W/SR 1 concurrency; interchange; northern end of freeway
Tennessee	Grainger	Bean Station	31.2	50.2		US 11W south (SR 1 west) – Rutledge, Knoxville	Northern end of US 11W/SR 1 concurrency; interchange
Tennessee	Grainger	Thorn Hill	38	61		SR 131 south (Mountain Valley Highway 131) – Washburn	Southern end of SR 131 concurrency.
Tennessee	Grainger	Thorn Hill	39	63		SR 131 north (Mountain Valley Highway 131) – Thorn Hill, Treadway	Northern end of SR 131 concurrency
Tennessee	Grainger	Thorn Hill			Bridge over Indian Creek		
Tennessee	Clinch River				Clinch River Bridge		
Tennessee	Claiborne				Bridge over Big Sycamore Creek/Norris Lake		
Tennessee	Claiborne		45.5	73.2		SR 33 north – Sneedville	Southern end of SR 33 concurrency
Tennessee	Claiborne	Springdale			Katie Johnson & William West Memorial Bridge over Little Sycamore Creek		
Tennessee	Claiborne	Tazewell	50.8	81.8		SR 33 south (N Broad Street) – New Tazewell, Maynardville	Northern end of SR 33 concurrency, proposed interchange along with SR 345; Currently an at-grade intersection with traffic signals.
Tennessee	Claiborne	Tazewell	51.3	82.6		SR 345 north (Cedar Fork Road)	Southern terminus of SR 345, proposed interchange along with SR 33; Currently an at-grade intersection with traffic signals.
Tennessee	Claiborne				Douglas W. Tripp Memorial Bridge over the Powell River		
Tennessee	Claiborne	Harrogate	60.2	96.9		SR 63 east (Forge Ridge Road) – Sneedville	Southern end of SR 63 concurrency, Northern end of ADHS Corridor S concurrency
Tennessee	Claiborne	Harrogate	60.4	97.2		SR 63 west (Appalachian Highway) – Arthur, Speedwell, Fincastle, LaFollette	Northern end of SR 63 concurrency; Southern end of ADHS Corridor F concurrency
Tennessee	Claiborne	Cumberland Gap	61.2	98.5		US 58 east (Wilderness Road/SR 383 east) – Jonesville, VA, Bristol, VA	Interchange; western terminus of US 58/SR 383
Cumberland Gap			65.9 0.000	106.1 0.000	Cumberland Gap Tunnel		
Kentucky	Bell	Cumberland Gap NHP	1.343	2.161		Cumberland Gap National Park Visitor Center & Craft Shop	Interchange
Kentucky	Bell	Middlesboro	1.719	2.766		KY 74 west – Airport	Southern end of KY 74 Truck concurrency
Kentucky	Bell	Middlesboro	2.781	4.476		KY 441 west / KY 74 Truck west	Northern end of KY 74 Truck concurrency
Kentucky	Bell		6.322	10.174		KY 3486 south	
Kentucky	Bell		6.402	10.303		KY 188 east	
Kentucky	Bell	Ferndale	8.313	13.378		KY 1534 north	
Kentucky	Bell		8.900	14.323		KY 3151 east	
Kentucky	Bell		11.604	18.675		KY 190 west – Chenoa, Frakes, Pine Mountain State Resort Park	
Kentucky	Bell	Pineville	12.355	19.883		US 119 north – Harlan, Martins Fork Lake	Northern end of ADHS Corridor F concurrency
Kentucky	Bell	Pineville	13.460	21.662		KY 66 north to KY 221 – Red Bird Mission	
Kentucky	Bell	Pineville	14.200	22.853		KY 2015 north	
Kentucky	Bell		17.360	27.938		KY 2014 east	
Kentucky	Bell		17.576	28.286		KY 92 west – Williamsburg, Whitley City	
Kentucky	Knox		19.075	30.698		KY 3085 south	
Kentucky	Knox		20.309	32.684		KY 3085 north	
Kentucky	Knox		21.543	34.670		KY 930 west	
Kentucky	Knox		21.709	34.937		KY 3085 south – Flat Lick	
Kentucky	Knox		22.471	36.164		KY 223 north – Dewitt	
Kentucky	Knox		24.081	38.755		KY 3439 west	
Kentucky	Knox		25.581	41.169		KY 1304 north to KY 11 – Bimble	
Kentucky	Knox	Barbourville	26.684	42.944		KY 3153 west	
Kentucky	Knox	Barbourville	27.418	44.125		KY 2415 north	
Kentucky	Knox	Barbourville	28.470	45.818		KY 225 south / KY 3439 east	
Kentucky	Knox	Barbourville	29.439	47.377		KY 11 south – Barbourville	Southern end of KY 11 concurrency
Kentucky	Knox	Barbourville	29.596	47.630		KY 2420 west – Downtown Barbourville	
Kentucky	Knox	Barbourville	30.205	48.610		KY 11 north – Manchester	Northern end of KY 11 concurrency
Kentucky	Knox		30.811	49.585		KY 1487 south	
Kentucky	Knox		31.206	50.221		KY 2418 south	
Kentucky	Knox		32.610	52.481		KY 3438 east	
Kentucky	Knox		33.124	53.308		KY 229 north – London	
Kentucky	Knox		34.437	55.421		KY 1527 east	
Kentucky	Knox		40.366	64.963		KY 233 – Gray	
Kentucky	Knox		42.227	67.958		KY 830	
Kentucky	Knox	Corbin	42.872	68.996		KY 3041 south to I-75 south	
Kentucky	Knox	Corbin	44.301	71.296		KY 312 west	
Kentucky	Knox	Corbin	44.593	71.765		KY 1629	
Kentucky	Laurel	North Corbin	45.192	72.729		US 25 north / US 25W south – Airport	US 25W and US 25E north merge to form US 25; US 25E signage continues
Kentucky	Laurel	North Corbin	45.703	73.552		KY 3431 to KY 1223	
Kentucky	Laurel	North Corbin	46.805– 46.872	75.325– 75.433		I-75 / KY 770 west – Knoxville, Lexington	I-75 exit 29; northern end of NHS Corridor 12 concurrency, northern terminus of US 25E
1.000 mi = 1.609 km; 1.000 km = 0.621 mi: Concurrency terminus; Incomplete access; Route transition
