= Kentucky Route 190 =

State highway in Kentucky, United States

Kentucky Route 190
- KY 190 highlighted in red

Route information
- Maintained by KYTC
- Length: 21.5 mi (34.6 km)

Major junctions
- West end: Tracey Branch Road at the Tennessee state line south of Frakes
- East end: US 25E south of Pineville

Location
- Country: United States
- State: Kentucky
- Counties: Bell

Highway system
- Kentucky State Highway System; Interstate; US; State; Parkways
← KY 189	→ KY 191

Kentucky Route 190 (KY 190) is a 21.5-mile-long (34.6 km) state highway in the U.S. state of Kentucky. The highway travels through rural areas of Bell County.

== Route description ==
KY 190 begins at the Tennessee state line, south of Frakes along the Whitley–Bell county line, where the highway continues as Tracey Branch Road. It travels to the north-northeast and curves to the north-northwest before traveling through Laurel Fork, where it passes a U.S. Post Office. It crosses over Wheeler Creek, intersects the southern terminus of KY 1595, enters Bell County proper, crosses over Laurel Fork, and intersects the eastern terminus of KY 3483 before it curves to the northeast. KY 190 enters Frakes. There, it passes a U.S. Post Office and Frakes Elementary School and intersects the western terminus of KY 3484 (Laurel Fork Road). After it leaves Frakes, it crosses Pine Creek. It then crosses over Clear Creek three times before it enters Henderson Grove. There, it intersects the northern terminus of KY 3485 (Henderson Hall Road). The highway enters Chenoa, where it also enters Kentucky Ridge State Forest. It intersects the northern terminus of KY 3492 (Correctional Drive), crosses over Fuson Branch, and passes Chenoa Lake. North of the lake, it leaves the state forest. A short distance later, KY 190 re-enters the forest. It has a fourth and then fifth crossing over Clear Creek. The road curves to the east and intersects the western terminus of KY 1491 (Snake Road). KY 190 curves to the southeast and has a sixth crossing of Clear Creek. It then curves back to the northeast and leaves the forest. It curves to the south and travels along the southern edge of Clear Creek Baptist Bible College. The highway curves to the east and crosses Hemlock Creek and Little Clear Creek. It then curves to the northeast and intersects the eastern terminus of KY 1491. KY 190 begins heading to the northeast. On the southeastern edge of Wasioto Winds Golf Course, it meets its eastern terminus, an interchange with U.S. Route 25E (US 25E).

== Major intersections ==
The entire route is in Bell County.

Location	mi	km	Destinations	Notes
Tennessee state line	0.0	0.0	Tracey Branch Road	Western terminus
	3.4	5.5	KY 1595 north	Southern terminus of KY 1595
	4.1	6.6	KY 3483 west	Eastern terminus of KY 3483
Frakes	5.1	8.2	KY 3484 (Laurel Fork Road)	Western terminus of KY 3484
Henderson Grove	7.4	11.9	KY 3485 south (Henderson Hall Road)	Northern terminus of KY 3485
Kentucky Ridge State Forest	9.6	15.4	KY 3492 south (Correctional Drive)	Northern terminus of KY 3492
Kentucky Ridge State Forest	17.6	28.3	KY 1491 east (Snake Road)	Eastern terminus of KY 1491
	19.9	32.0	KY 1491 west	Eastern terminus of KY 1491
	21.5	34.6	US 25E – Middlesboro, Pineville	Eastern terminus
1.000 mi = 1.609 km; 1.000 km = 0.621 mi
