= Tennessee State Route 474 =

Former state highway in Tennessee, United States

State Route 474
- Merchants Greene Boulevard

Route information
- Maintained by TDOT
- Length: 1.4 mi (2.3 km)
- Existed: 2000s–2020

Major junctions
- South end: SR 160 southwest of Morristown
- North end: US 11E in Morristown

Location
- Country: United States
- State: Tennessee
- Counties: Hamblen

Highway system
- Tennessee State Routes; Interstate; US; State
← SR 462	→ SR 476

State Route 474 (SR 474, known as Merchants Greene Boulevard) was a 1.4-mile-long (2.3 km) five-lane state highway in Hamblen County in the eastern portion of the U.S. state of Tennessee. It served as a connector route from SR 160 to US 11E/SR 34. It was decommissioned and designated as part of SR 66 following an extension project by TDOT in November 2020.

== Route description ==
SR 474 began at an intersection with SR 160 (Gov. Dewitt Clinton Senter Highway) at a traffic signal southwest of Morristown. The route then proceeds northwest through rural areas of Morristown. It crosses over a Norfolk Southern Railway line then it continued to the northwest and meets its northern terminus, an intersection with US 11E/SR 34 (West Andrew Johnson Highway) in the western part of Morristown.

== Major intersections ==
The entire route is in Hamblen County.

Location	mi	km	Destinations	Notes
	0.0	0.0	SR 160 (Gov. Dewitt Clinton Senter Highway) – Jefferson City, Newport	Southern terminus
Morristown			Veterans Parkway To SR 160 / SR 342	
Morristown	1.4	2.3	US 11E (West Andrew Johnson Highway/SR 34) – Jefferson City, Greeneville	Northern terminus
1.000 mi = 1.609 km; 1.000 km = 0.621 mi

== See also ==
- List of state routes in Tennessee
