= Kentucky Route 770 =

State highway in Kentucky, United States

Kentucky Route 770

Route information
- Maintained by KYTC
- Length: 1.243 mi (2.000 km)

Major junctions
- West end: KY 312 in rural southwest Laurel County
- East end: I-75 / US 25E near North Corbin

Location
- Country: United States
- State: Kentucky
- Counties: Laurel

Highway system
- Kentucky State Highway System; Interstate; US; State; Parkways
← KY 769	→ KY 771

Kentucky Route 770 (KY 770) is an east–west rural secondary state highway located entirely in Laurel County in southeastern Kentucky. The route is 1.243 miles (2.000 km) long.

== Route description ==
KY 770 connects KY 312 to the Interstate 75/U.S. Route 25E junction at the interstate's Exit 29 interchange.
