= Harland Sanders Café and Museum =

Historic commercial building in Kentucky, United States

- Harland Sanders Café
- U.S. National Register of Historic Places
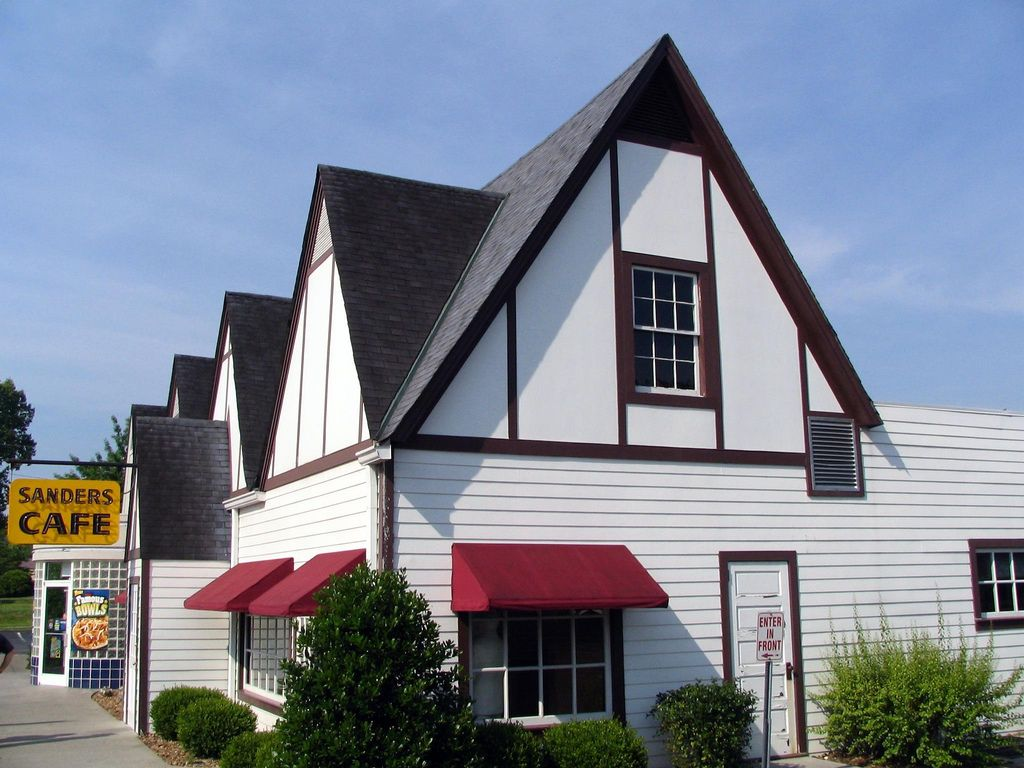
- Harland Sanders Café

- Location within Kentucky Location within the United States
- Interactive map showing the Harland Sanders Cafe location
- Location: 688 U.S. Route 25W, North Corbin, Kentucky
- Coordinates: 36°57′35″N 84°05′39″W
- Built: 1940
- NRHP reference No.: 90001169
- Added to NRHP: August 7, 1990

The Harland Sanders Café is a historic restaurant located in North Corbin, Kentucky. Colonel Harland Sanders, the founder of KFC, operated the restaurant from 1940 to 1956. Sanders also developed the famous KFC secret recipe at the café during the 1940s. It was added to the National Register of Historic Places on August 7, 1990.

== History ==
After moving to Corbin in 1930, Sanders started a Kyso service station across the street from the present location of the Harland Sanders Café along U.S. Route 25. Sanders served meals for travelers in the back of the service station at his own dining table, which seated six people. By 1937, the culinary skills of Sanders became well known and he built the Sanders Café, which seated 142 people. Two years later, the restaurant was destroyed by fire.

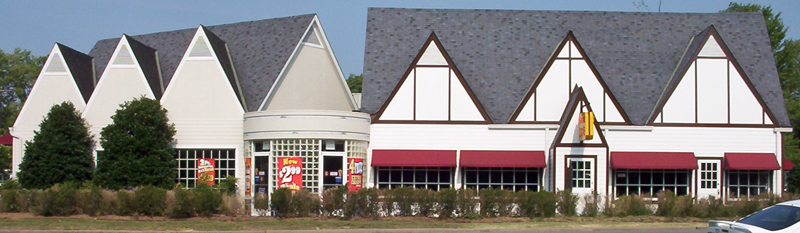
Tourists can purchase their food in the modern KFC (left) and dine in the café (right) which now serves both as a museum and as the seating area for the restaurant.

Shortly after the fire in 1939, construction began on the present Sanders Café, along with the addition of a motel. The restaurant-motel complex reopened on July 4, 1940. A new addition to the café was a model of the rooms located in the adjacent Sanders' Motel. This was used to persuade customers to spend the night at the motel.

Business continued to boom as it was located along U.S. 25, the main north–south route through central Kentucky. This soon changed with the relocation of the U.S. Route 25 split into US 25E and US 25W from being in the literal middle of his properties, to a new US 25E roadbed a mile north, in order to allow better access to US 25E from the recently proposed Interstate 75. This resulted in US 25E bypassing the restaurant and city entirely for traffic going to and from the Carolinas and Georgia coasts, and Interstate 75 (when completed through the area in the early 1970s) doing the same for traffic heading towards Atlanta and Florida. Sanders sold the café in 1956 and began selling franchises for KFC. At some point after KFC franchising began, a franchised KFC was sited in the building, using the original kitchen, but converting the model motel room into larger restrooms. This KFC franchise remained in operation until 1988, when it was closed for renovation into the current structure.

The Harland Sanders Café was renovated and reopened in the fall of 1990 as a museum. A modern KFC kitchen was also built adjacent to the café on some of the former motel land, and the two structures attached by an entrance lobby that contains many of the smaller museum displays. The model motel room was restored to its original state as part of the renovation, and modern restrooms added to the back of the original structure. While at the museum, visitors can tour the office of Harland Sanders, see the kitchen where Sanders developed the KFC secret formula, and view KFC memorabilia.
