= Tennessee State Route 343 =

State highway in Tennessee, United States

State Route 343
- TN 343 highlighted in red

Route information
- Maintained by TDOT
- Length: 7.7 mi (12.4 km)
- Existed: July 1, 1983–present

Major junctions
- South end: US 25E / SR 113 south of Morristown
- US 11E in downtown Morristown
- North end: US 25E in Morristown

Location
- Country: United States
- State: Tennessee
- Counties: Hamblen

Highway system
- Tennessee State Routes; Interstate; US; State
← SR 342	→ SR 344

State Route 343 (SR 343) is a state highway in Morristown, Hamblen County in the U.S. state of Tennessee. It serves as connector from US 25E into downtown Morristown.

== Route description ==
SR 343 begins at an intersection with US 25E south of Morristown and north of White Pine and is called Old US Highway 25E. It heads north and has an interchange with SR 160 and continues north through a commercial area/retail area and into downtown Morristown. After intersecting with SR 160, SR 343 becomes known as South Cumberland Street. There, SR 343 has an intersection with US 11E and SR 66 at two separate intersections. At the SR 66 intersection, the name changes to North Cumberland Street and then travels north to an intersection where the Cumberland Street designation comes to an end and it becomes Buffalo Trail, the route continues north under this name and ends at US 25E on the north side of Morristown, just 0.5 miles (0.80 km) from the Hamblen–Grainger county line.

At the northern terminus there is partial interchange, traffic wanting to go northbound on US 25E from SR 343 must go follow the on ramp and go under US 25E, and traffic coming southbound on US 25E must use the on ramp from southbound US 25E. And for traffic going northbound on US 25E traffic must turn on a short side road called South Cherokee Park Road and for traffic on SR 343 wanting to go southbound US 25E must also use the side road.

== Junction list ==
The entire route is in Morristown, Hamblen County.

mi	km	Destinations	Notes
0.0	0.0	US 25E / SR 113 (Davy Crockett Parkway/SR 32) – White Pine, Newport	Southern terminus
2.3	3.7	SR 160 – Newport, Jefferson City	Interchange
3.9	6.3	US 11E (Morris Boulevard/SR 34) – Jefferson City, Bulls Gap	
4.1	6.6	SR 66 (First North Street) – Jefferson City, Bulls Gap	
7.5	12.1	Cherokee Park Road to US 25E south (N Davy Crockett Parkway/SR 32 south) – Morristown	
7.7	12.4	US 25E north (N Davy Crockett Parkway/SR 32 north) – Bean Station	Interchange; northern terminus; southbound exit and northbound entrance
1.000 mi = 1.609 km; 1.000 km = 0.621 mi: Incomplete access

== See also ==
- List of state routes in Tennessee
