= Middlesboro Mall =

- Location: Middlesboro, Kentucky, United States
- Coordinates: 36.6193°N 83.7060°W
- Address: 905 North 12th Street
- Opened: October 1983
- Owner: Ershig Properties
- Num. of stores: 26+
- Num. of anchor tenants: 4 (4 open)
- Floor area: 317,426 square feet (29,489.8 m^{2})
- Floors: 1

Middlesboro Mall is an enclosed shopping mall in Middlesboro, Kentucky, on U.S. Route 25E. It includes over 26 stores and services. Anchor stores are Belk, Roses, Golden Ticket Cinemas and Hobby Lobby.

== History ==
The mall is part of a retail business concentration that developed along U.S. 25E beginning in the late 1960s. It opened in October 1983 with Belk, JCPenney, Kmart and an array of specialty merchants. The mall's first owner was David Hocker and Associates. The mall is an important retail center for a large rural area in the mountains of eastern Kentucky and nearby Tennessee.

Sears joined the mall in June 1987 with a 16,500-square-foot (1,530 m^{2}) hometown store, then added another 5,283 square feet (490.8 m^{2}) in 1989. Kmart closed on June 1, 2002. Steve & Barry's opened in place of Kmart in 2006 but closed in 2009 following bankruptcy in the midst of the 2008 economic downturn. Roses opened to fill the Kmart store in 2010. Sears left in November 2012 and opened a new store north of the Mall on U.S. Route 25E.

On June 4, 2020, JCPenney announced that this location would close as part of a plan to close 154 stores nationwide.

In January 2024, it was announced that Hobby Lobby would be joining the mall to occupy the vacant JCPenney space. It opened on May 10, 2024.

Since 2004, the mall has been owned by Ershig Properties, which is based in Henderson, Kentucky.

== Literacy programs ==
Middlesboro Mall has a history of supporting community literacy programs. The mall's use as a site for adult literacy classes was cited in a 1993 academic paper as an example of the function of shopping malls as "public spaces" for their communities. The Children's Reading Foundation of Appalachia-KY has used the facility for Read Across America events and local events such as Malloween, Books with Santa, and a back-to-school fashion show. In 2013, the mall management announced that, after observing the importance of these activities for the community, it was donating space in the mall to house offices of the Children's Reading Foundation.
