= Clay Wade Bailey Bridge =

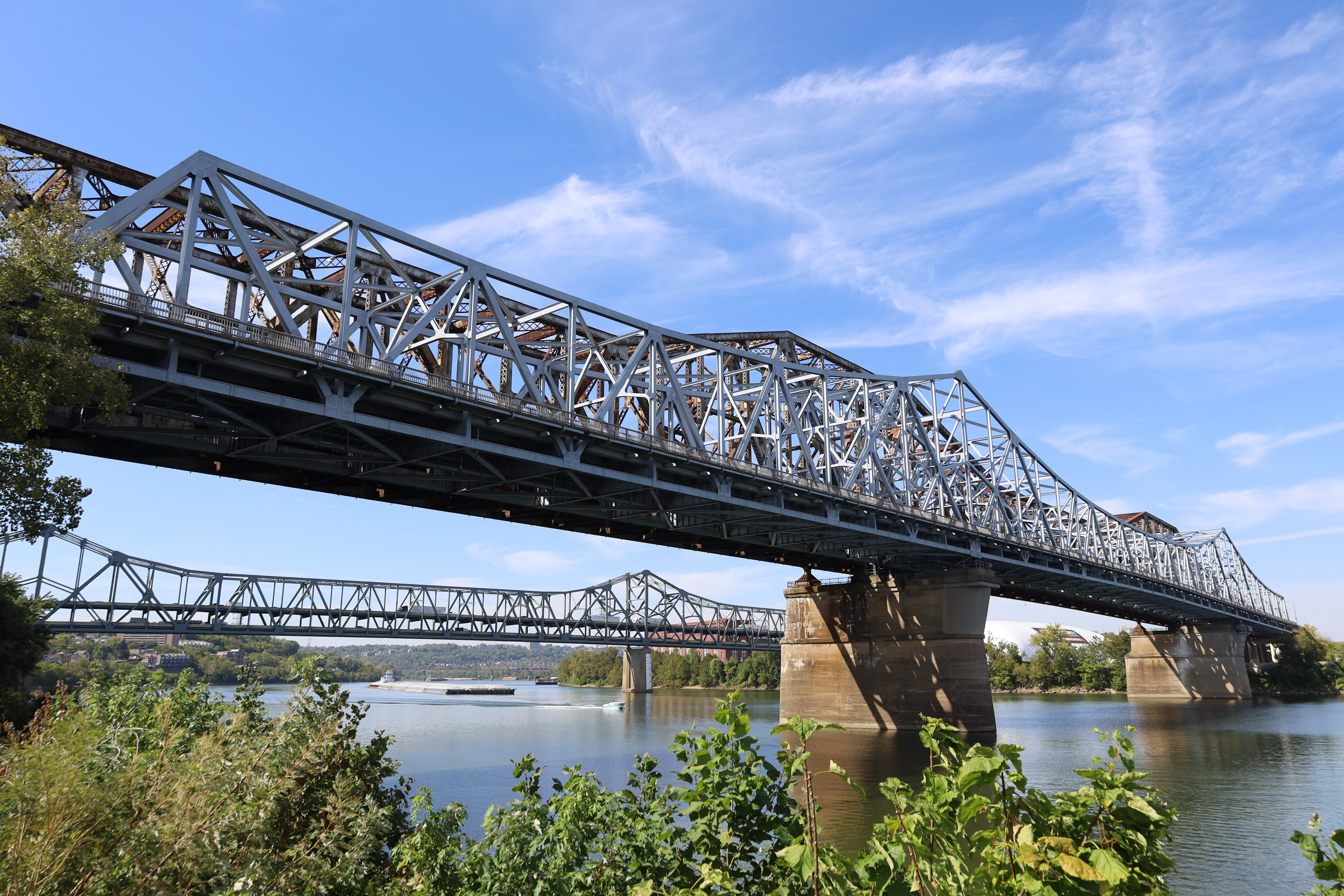
- Looking from Kentucky, the Clay Wade Bailey Bridge is the nearest bridge in the foreground.
- Coordinates: 39°5′28.0″N 84°31′9.5″W
- Carries: 3 lanes of US 25 / US 42 / US 127
- Crosses: Ohio River
- Locale: Covington, Kentucky and Cincinnati, Ohio
- Maintained by: Kentucky Transportation Cabinet

Characteristics
- Design: Cantilever bridge
- Longest span: 675 feet (206 meters)

History
- Construction cost: $13.5 million
- Opened: October 1974

Statistics
- Daily traffic: 12,200

The Clay Wade Bailey Bridge is a cantilever bridge carrying U.S. Route 42 and U.S. Route 127 across the Ohio River, connecting Cincinnati, Ohio and Covington, Kentucky. It also carries U.S. Route 25, the northern terminus of which is the Ohio state line, at the historic low-water mark of the Ohio River. The bridge's main span is 675 feet (206 m). It is a 3-lane bridge; Two lanes are dedicated to travel each way and the middle lane is a reversible lane, meaning the direction of travel of the middle lane changes according to the time of day.

The bridge was named after a prominent political reporter for The Kentucky Post, Clay Wade Bailey; it is not a bailey bridge.

== See also ==
- List of crossings of the Ohio River
