= U.S. Route 25 =

Highway in the United States

U.S. Route 25
- US 25 highlighted in red

Route information
- Length: 750 mi (1,210 km) via US 25W
- Existed: November 11, 1926–present

Southern segment
- South end: US 17 in Brunswick, GA
- Major intersections: I-95 in Dock Junction, GA; I-16 near Register, GA; I-20 in North Augusta, SC; I-85 in Greenville, SC; I-26 / US 74 near Flat Rock, NC; I-40 in Asheville, NC
- North end: US 25E / US 25W / US 70 in Newport, TN

Northern segment
- South end: US 25E / US 25W in North Corbin, KY
- Major intersections: I-75 at various locations in KY; US 60 / US 68 in Lexington, KY; US 42 / US 127 in Florence, KY; I-275 in Crestview Hills, KY
- North end: US 42 / US 127 at the Ohio state line in Covington, KY

Location
- Country: United States
- States: Georgia, South Carolina, North Carolina, Tennessee, Kentucky

Highway system
- United States Numbered Highway System; List; Special; Divided
← US 24	→ US 26

U.S. Route 25 or U.S. Highway 25 (US 25) is a north–south United States Numbered Highway that runs for 750 miles (1,210 km) in the Southern and Midwestern U.S. Its southern terminus is in Brunswick, Georgia, from where it proceeds mostly due north, passing through the cities of Augusta, Georgia; Greenville, South Carolina; and Asheville, North Carolina, before dividing into two branches, known as US 25W and US 25E between Newport, Tennessee, and North Corbin, Kentucky. After passing through Richmond and Lexington, Kentucky, it reaches its northern terminus at the Ohio state line in Covington, Kentucky. The route is an important crossing of the Appalachian Mountains, and it is covered by three of the corridors of the Appalachian Development Highway System (ADHS). When the highway was originally established in 1926, the route extended from North Augusta, South Carolina, to Port Huron, Michigan. The southern end was extended to its current terminus in 1936, while the northern end was truncated in 1974.

== Route description ==
Lengths
	mi	km
GA	190.0	305.8
SC	140.6	226.3
NC	75.4	121.3
TN	20.3	32.7
25E	112.8	181.5
25W	145.7	234.5
KY	177.3	285.3
Total	862.1	1,387.4

=== Georgia ===
Starting at the intersection of US 17/State Route 25 in Brunswick, US 25 goes northwest to Jesup then northeast to Ludowici. It then stays at a general north route through the cities of Statesboro, Millen, Waynesboro, and finally Augusta, where it crosses the Savannah River into South Carolina. As it led south from Augusta, the predecessor thoroughfare was known as the "Southeastern Plank Road" which later became "Peach Orchard Road" which name is still in use in southern Richmond County. The plank road likely connected with the Florida–Georgia Plank Road from Brunswick to Jacksonville, Florida. Currently, the overall majority of US 25 is four lanes.

=== South Carolina ===
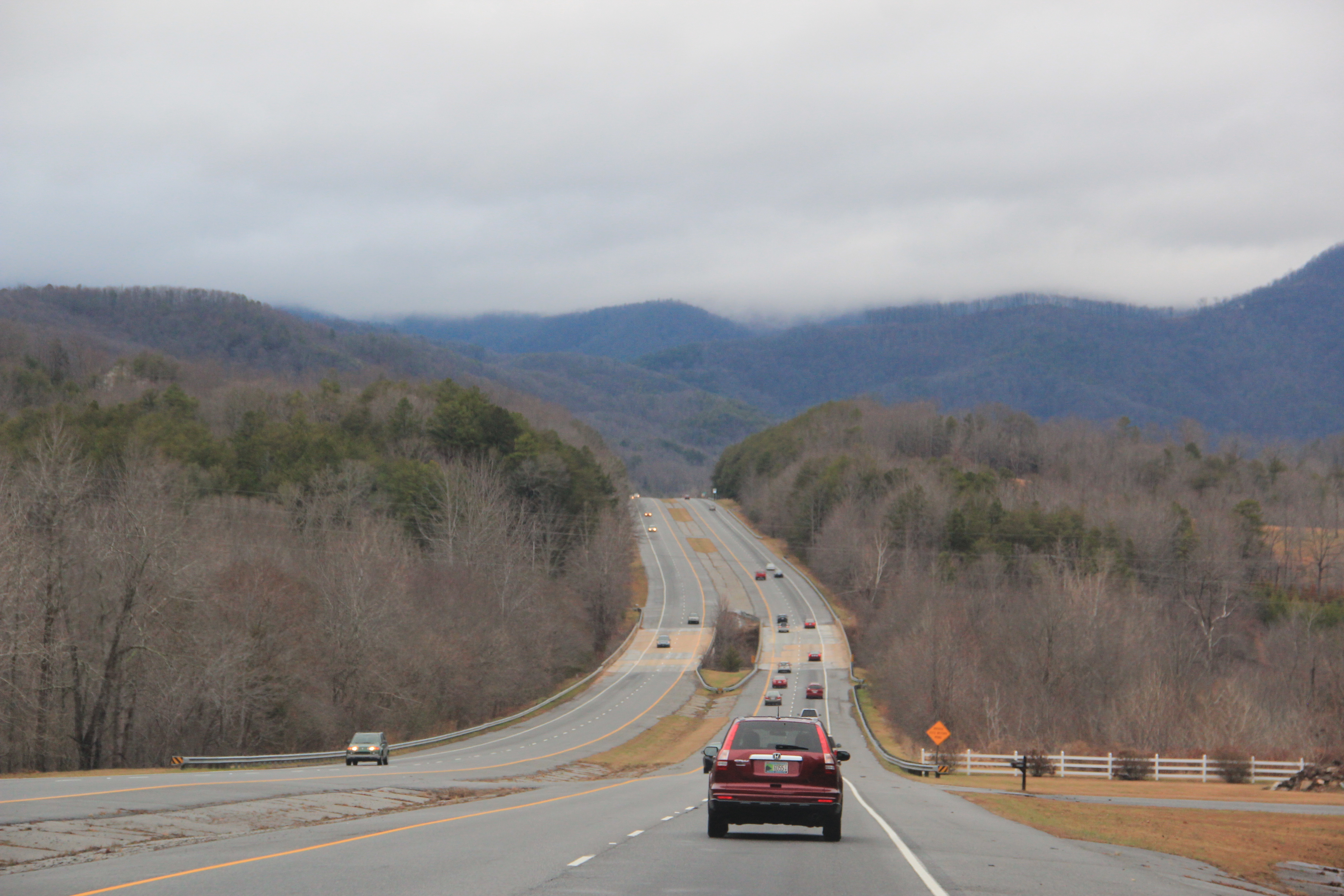
US 25 north of Travelers Rest, South Carolina

Entering South Carolina from Augusta, Georgia, US 25 goes north through downtown North Augusta, connecting with Interstate 20 (I-20) just outside town. US 25 goes northwesterly through the cities of Edgefield, Greenwood, and Greenville, going due north at Travelers Rest to the North Carolina state line. Majority of the route is four lanes, with various sections at expressway grade.

=== North Carolina ===
US 25 becomes a freeway from the state line in Tuxedo, in Henderson County. It continues for nine miles (14 km) before connecting with I-26/US 74 near East Flat Rock. Splitting from I-26/US 74 near Fletcher, it goes north through Arden, Biltmore Forest, and downtown Asheville, before reconnecting with I-26 near Woodfin. At Weaverville, US 25 and US 70 travel northwesterly together, through Marshall and Hot Springs into Tennessee.

=== Tennessee ===
In concurrency with US 70 and State Route 9 (SR 9), US 25 enters the state through the Bald Mountains, followed by crossing the French Broad River along Wolf Creek Bridge. Along the northern bank of the French Broad River, it crosses back over and leaves the Cherokee National Forest. US 25 enters Newport, after crossing the Pigeon River, and serves as Broadway Street through the downtown area. At the western edge of Newport, US 25 splits: US 25E toward Morristown and US 25W toward Knoxville.

=== U.S. Route 25E ===
Traversing a 112.8 miles (181.5 km) from Newport, Tennessee, to North Corbin, Kentucky, US 25E connects the cities of White Pine, Morristown, Bean Station, Tazewell, and Harrogate in Tennessee. Entering Kentucky via the Cumberland Gap Tunnel, it connects the cities of Middlesboro and Barbourville. In North Corbin, after merging back with US 25W, a US 25E connector continues west to I-75.

=== U.S. Route 25W ===
Traversing a 145.7 miles (234.5 km) from Newport, Tennessee, to North Corbin, Kentucky, US 25W goes west connecting Dandridge and Knoxville and northwest to Clinton. Going north in parallel or in concurrency with I-75, it goes through Caryville, Jacksboro, LaFollette, and Jellico, before crossing the Tennessee–Kentucky line. Continuing north, it goes through Williamsburg before going through downtown Corbin and then reconnecting with US 25E in North Corbin.

=== Kentucky ===
US 25 starts again in North Corbin and traverses north, in parallel with I-75, connecting the cities of London, Berea, Richmond, Lexington, and Dry Ridge. US 25 ends in Covington at the Ohio state line over the Ohio River along the Clay Wade Bailey Bridge; US 42/US 127 continue into Cincinnati.

=== ADHS corridors ===
US 25 overlaps with three corridors that are part of the ADHS, which is part of Appalachian Regional Commission (ARC). Passed in 1965, the purpose of the ADHS is to generate economic development in previously isolated areas, supplement the Interstate System, connect Appalachia to the Interstate System, and provide access to areas within the region as well as to markets in the rest of the nation.

- Corridor F: From I-75, in Caryville, Tennessee, to US 23, in Jenkins, Kentucky. US 25W overlaps a 8.5-mile (13.7 km) section in Caryville; though already a four-lane boulevard, it is slated to be improved upon in that area. US 25E overlaps a 15.0-mile (24.1 km) section, centered around the Cumberland Gap area. From Harrogate, Tennessee, to Pineville, Kentucky, US 25E is a mostly four-lane limited-access road with interchanges at major intersections.
- Corridor S: From I-81, near Morristown, Tennessee, to SR 63, in Harrogate, Tennessee. The entire 48.7-mile (78.4 km) section of US 25E is authorized for ADHS funding. As of 2013, 22.2 miles (35.7 km) is still slated for construction along the route. Cutting through various mountain ridges, US 25E provides a four-lane limited-access road with interchanges at major intersections.
- Corridor W: From I-85, in Greenville, South Carolina, to I-26/US 74, near East Flat Rock, North Carolina. Of the 39.7-mile (63.9 km) section of US 25, only 30.4 miles (48.9 km) was authorized for ADHS funding. In 2013, both states have completed Corridor W. US 25 in South Carolina provides a four-to-six-lane limited-access road, with interchanges at major intersections; while US 25 in North Carolina is a four-lane controlled-access highway.

== History ==
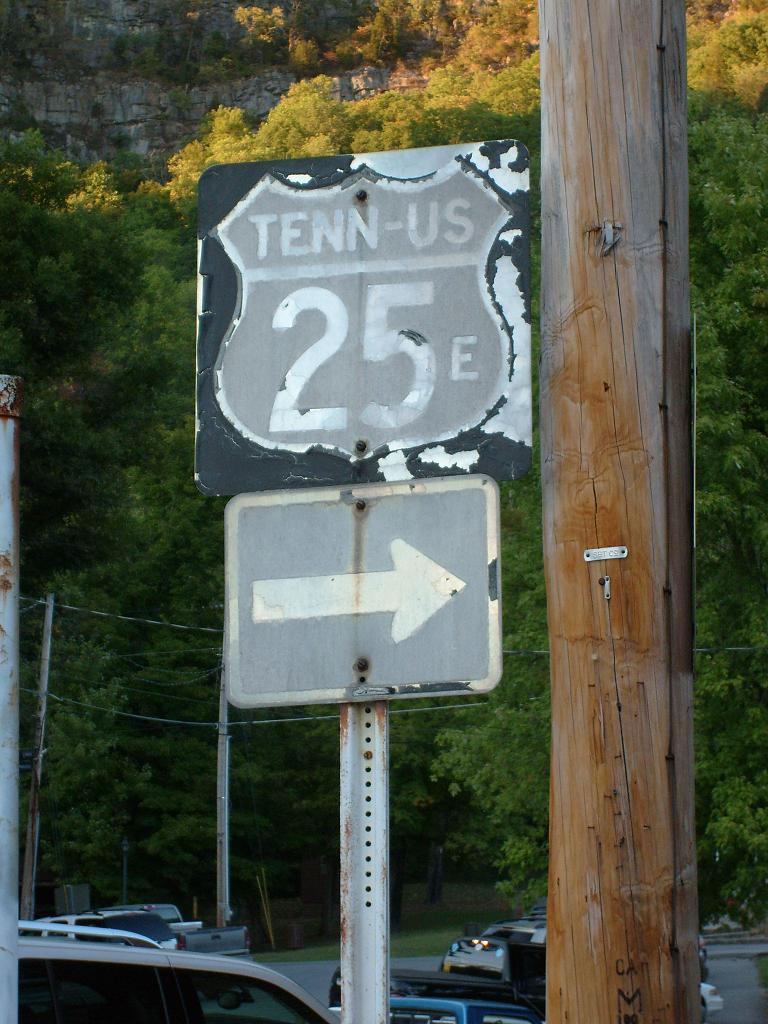
Old US 25E sign in Cumberland Gap, Tennessee, directing traffic to former route over Cumberland Gap

US 25 was established on November 11, 1926, as part of the original U.S. Numbered Highway System; it was routed along the Dixie Highway from North Augusta, South Carolina, to Port Huron, Michigan, with two divides (US 25E and US 25W) through Tennessee and Kentucky, with US 25E having also a short section in Virginia. In 1928, one divided section between Richmond and Newport, Kentucky, was removed; US 25 followed the US 25W routing, while US 25E was mostly replaced by US 27. In 1929, US 25 was extended south into Georgia, ending at US 80 near Statesboro, Georgia. In 1933, US 25 was extended north from Port Huron to Port Austin, Michigan. In 1936, US 25 was extended south again to its current terminus at US 17 in Brunswick, Georgia. In 1957, US 25 was shifted onto new four-lane road in Richmond County, Georgia.

In 1974, US 25 was eliminated in Ohio and Michigan, establishing its northern terminus on the Clay Wade Bailey Bridge in Covington, Kentucky. Its former alignment was replaced by I-75 between Cincinnati and Detroit, and I-94 between Detroit and Port Huron. M-25 continues as the designation of former US 25 between Port Huron and Port Austin, while Ohio State Route 25 identifies much of the former route from Toledo to near Cygnet, Ohio.

In 2000, US 25E was rerouted through the Cumberland Gap Tunnel (opened four years prior), making a direct link between Tennessee and Kentucky, eliminating Virginia's short section. Its old alignment that went through historic Cumberland Gap was handed over to the Cumberland Gap National Historical Park, and the former roadbed through the park restored to an early 19th-century wagon path.

== Major intersections ==
Southern segment

Georgia
US 17 in Brunswick
US 341 in Brunswick. The highways travel concurrently to Jesup.
I-95 in Dock Junction
US 301 / US 341 in Jesup. US 25/US 301 travel concurrently to Statesboro.
US 84 in Jesup. The highways travel concurrently to Ludowici.
US 280 in Claxton
I-16 south-southeast of Register
US 80 in Statesboro. The highways travel concurrently to Hopeulikit.
I-520 in Augusta
US 1 / US 78 / US 278 in Augusta. The highways travel concurrently to North Augusta, South Carolina.

South Carolina

I-20 in North Augusta
US 378 north-northwest of Edgefield
US 178 south-southeast of Greenwood. The highways travel concurrently to southeast of Hodges.
US 221 in Greenwood. The highways travel concurrently through the city.
US 76 in Princeton. The highways travel concurrently to northwest of Princeton.
I-185 south of Gantt
I-85 on the Gantt–Greenville city line
I-185 south-southwest of Dunean
US 123 on the Welcome–Parker city line
US 276 south of Travelers Rest. The highways travel concurrently, but on different lanes, to Travelers Rest.

North Carolina

US 176 south of East Flat Rock
I-26 / US 74 east of East Flat Rock. The highways travel concurrently to Fletcher.
US 64 in Hendersonville
I-40 in Asheville
I-240 / US 70 in Asheville
Future I-26 / US 19 / US 23 / US 70 in Woodfin. I-26/US 19/US 23/US 25 travel concurrently to Weaverville. US 25/US 70 travel concurrently to Newport, Tennessee.

Tennessee

US 321 in Newport. The highways travel concurrently through the city.
US 25E / US 25W / US 70 / US 321 in Newport

Northern segment

Kentucky
US 25E / US 25W in North Corbin
I-75 east-southeast of Mt. Vernon
US 150 in Mt. Vernon
I-75 in Mt. Vernon
US 421 south-southeast of Richmond. The highways travel concurrently to Lexington.
I-75 in Richmond
I-75 south-southeast of Lexington. The highways travel concurrently to Lexington.
US 60 in Lexington. The highways travel concurrently through the city.
US 27 / US 60 / US 68 in Lexington
US 62 / US 460 in Georgetown
US 42 / US 127 in Florence. The highways travel concurrently to the Ohio state line.
I-275 in Crestview Hills
I-71 / I-75 in Fort Mitchell
I-71 / I-75 in Covington

== See also ==
- Special routes of U.S. Route 25
- Dixie Highway

Browse numbered routes
← SR 24	TN	→ SR 25
← I-24	list	→ KY 26
