= Gray, Kentucky =

Unincorporated community in Kentucky, United States

- Unincorporated community
- Location within Kentucky Location within the United States
- Coordinates: 36°56′33″N 84°00′30″W
- Country: United States
- State: Kentucky
- County: Knox
- Elevation: 1,109 ft (338 m)
- Time zone: UTC-5 (Eastern (EST))
  - Summer (DST): UTC-4 (EDT)
- ZIP code: 40734
- Area code: 606
- GNIS feature ID: 512406

Gray is an unincorporated community in Knox County, in southeastern Kentucky, United States. The community is located along US 25E 4.9 miles (7.9 km) East of Corbin. Gray has a post office with ZIP code 40734, which opened on January 25, 1888. There was also a radio station, WKYZ 1590 AM, that began broadcasting in 1984, but the license was deleted in 1998.
