= Douglas Lake =

Man-made reservoir in Tennessee, United States

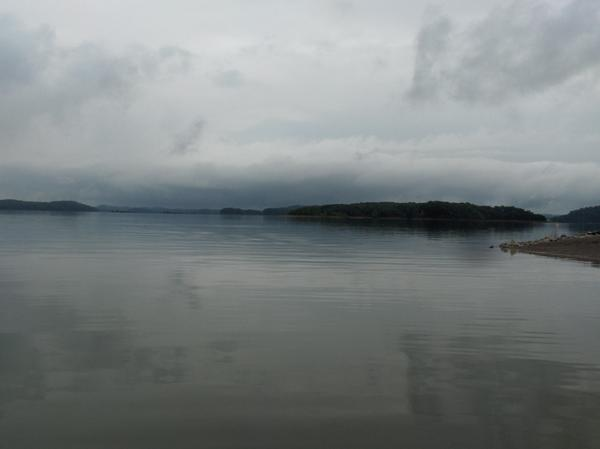
- Douglas Lake

- Location within Tennessee Location within the United States
- Location: Jefferson / Cocke / Sevier / Hamblen counties, State of Tennessee
- Coordinates: 35°57′40″N 83°32′20″W
- Type: Reservoir
- Primary inflows: French Broad River
- Primary outflows: French Broad River
- Basin countries: United States
- Max. length: 60 mi (97 km)
- Max. width: 3,527 ft (1,075 m)
- Surface area: 44.41 sq mi (115.0 km^{2})
- Water volume: 1,081,880 acre⋅ft (1.33448 km^{3})
- Shore length^{1}: 513 mi (826 km)
- Surface elevation: 876 ft (267 m)
- ^{1} Shore length is not a well-defined measure.

Douglas Lake, also called Douglas Reservoir, is a reservoir created by an impoundment of the French Broad River in Eastern Tennessee. This lake is located only a few miles from the Pigeon Forge/Gatlinburg area, and also the Great Smoky Mountains National Park.

The Douglas Dam was built by the Tennessee Valley Authority at a record pace from February 2, 1942, through February 19, 1943, to provide hydroelectric power and to control flooding downstream in the Tennessee River Valley. Douglas Dam is located just over 32 miles (51 km) upstream from the French Broad River's confluence with the Holston River in Knoxville, to form the Tennessee River. The Douglas Lake reservoir inundates about a 40-mile (64 km) stretch of the French Broad River between the Douglas Dam and the Irish Bottoms area near Newport. Small portions of the Nolichucky and Pigeon rivers are also impounded by the lake. During the winter months, the Tennessee Valley Authority lowers the water level to help control flooding, meet power demands, and many other objectives.

The resort town of Baneberry is located on the northern shores of the lake in Jefferson County. Dandridge, the county seat of Jefferson County, is located mostly on the northern shores with a small portion on the southern. Parts of downtown Dandridge are located below the lake's operating levels, and are protected by an earthen dam.
