= Tennessee State Route 342 =

State highway in Tennessee, United States

State Route 342
- TN 342 highlighted in red

Route information
- Maintained by TDOT
- Length: 7.5 mi (12.1 km)
- Existed: July 1, 1983–present

Major junctions
- West end: Panther Creek Park Road and Panther Creek Road northwest of Morristown
- US 11E in Morristown
- East end: US 11E / SR 160 in Morristown

Location
- Country: United States
- State: Tennessee
- Counties: Hamblen

Highway system
- Tennessee State Routes; Interstate; US; State
| ← SR 341 | → SR 343 |

State Route 342 (SR 342) is a state highway in Hamblen County in the eastern part of the U.S. state of Tennessee. The route serves as a connector to Panther Creek State Park.

== Route description ==
SR 342 begins inside Panther Creek State Park at the intersection of Panther Creek Park Road and Panther Creek Road. The route then heads southeast to junction with US 11E and the two routes begin a short 1.2-mile-long (1.9 km) concurrency to and intersection with SR 160 where SR 342 ends.

== History ==
SR 342 formerly turned south along SR 160 and the two routes then began a short 1.9-mile-long (3.1 km) concurrency. Then SR 342 turns southeast and met its original eastern terminus at an intersection with SR 66.

== Major intersections ==
The entire route is in Hamblen County.

| Location | mi | km | Destinations | Notes |
|---|---|---|---|---|
| Panther Creek State Park | 0.0 | 0.0 | Panther Creek Road and Panther Creek Park Road | Western terminus |
| Morristown | | | US 11E (West Andrew Johnson Highway/SR 34) – Morristown | Eastern end of US 11E/SR 34 concurrency |
| Morristown | | | US 11E south (West Andrew Johnson Highway/SR 34) / SR 160 begin – Jefferson City, New Market | Western end of US 11E/SR 34 concurrency; northern terminus of SR 160; Eastern terminus of SR 342 |
| Morristown | | | SR 160 south (Air Park Boulevard) – Newport | Western end of former SR 160 concurrency |
| | 7.5 | 12.1 | SR 66 – Morristown, White Pine, Dandridge | Original eastern terminus |
1.000 mi = 1.609 km; 1.000 km = 0.621 mi: Concurrency terminus
