= Baneberry, Tennessee =

Baneberry
- City
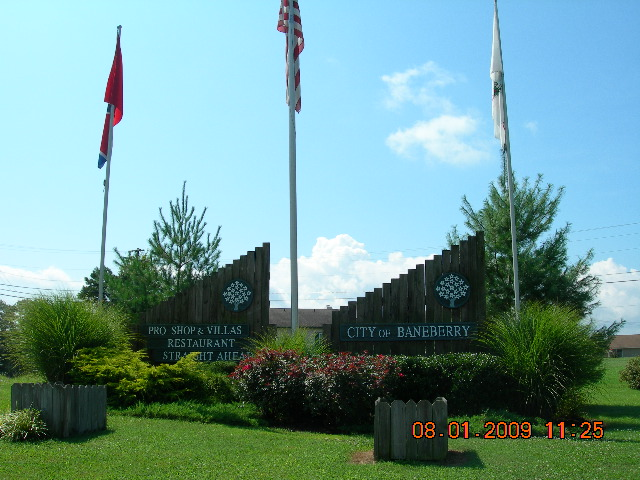
- Baneberry welcome sign

- Flag Seal

- Location of Baneberry in Jefferson County, Tennessee.
- Coordinates: 36°2′45″N 83°16′33″W
- Country: United States
- State: Tennessee
- County: Jefferson

Government
  - Type: Manager-Commissioner
  - Mayor & City Commissioner: Mark Plonski
  - Vice Mayor & City Commissioner: Tom Carter
  - City Commissioner: Mark Howard
  - City Manager: Michael Phagan
  - Other Officials: Other: Russ Gawler (Fire Chief); Vicky Gentry (City Clerk & City Recorder)

Area
  - Total: 1.78 sq mi (4.61 km^{2})
  - Land: 1.78 sq mi (4.61 km^{2})
  - Water: 0 sq mi (0.00 km^{2})
- Elevation: 1,070 ft (326 m)

Population (2020)
  - Total: 523
  - Density: 293.6/sq mi (113.37/km^{2})
- Time zone: UTC-5 (Eastern (EST))
  - Summer (DST): UTC-4 (EDT)
- ZIP code: 37890
- Area code: 865
- FIPS code: 47-03078
- GNIS feature ID: 1302697
- Website: cityofbaneberry.com

Baneberry is a city in Jefferson County, Tennessee. It is part of the Morristown Metropolitan Statistical Area. The population was 523 at the 2020 census. The community was named for native baneberry bushes near the original town site.

== Geography ==
Baneberry is located at 36°2′45″N 83°16′33″W (36.045912, -83.275804).

According to the United States Census Bureau, the city has a total area of 1.8 square miles (4.7 km^{2}), all land.

== Demographics ==
Historical population
Census	Pop.	Note	%±
1990	218		—
2000	366		67.9%
2010	482		31.7%
2020	523		8.5%
2024 (est.)	578		10.5%

=== 2020 census ===
As of the 2020 census, Baneberry had a population of 523 people, with 232 households and 187 families residing in the city.

The median age was 58.0 years. 14.0% of residents were under the age of 18 and 35.4% of residents were 65 years of age or older. For every 100 females there were 106.7 males, and for every 100 females age 18 and over there were 101.8 males age 18 and over.

0.0% of residents lived in urban areas, while 100.0% lived in rural areas.

There were 232 households in Baneberry, of which 22.4% had children under the age of 18 living in them. Of all households, 68.5% were married-couple households, 12.5% were households with a male householder and no spouse or partner present, and 17.7% were households with a female householder and no spouse or partner present. About 19.8% of all households were made up of individuals and 12.9% had someone living alone who was 65 years of age or older.

There were 271 housing units, of which 14.4% were vacant. The homeowner vacancy rate was 1.9% and the rental vacancy rate was 17.6%.

Racial composition as of the 2020 census
Race	Number	Percent
White	501	95.8%
Black or African American	1	0.2%
American Indian and Alaska Native	0	0.0%
Asian	1	0.2%
Native Hawaiian and Other Pacific Islander	0	0.0%
Some other race	9	1.7%
Two or more races	11	2.1%
Hispanic or Latino (of any race)	15	2.9%

=== 2010 census ===
As of the census of 2010, there were 482 people living in the city; a 31.7% population increase since 2000 or 45.2% since 1990. The population density was 265 inhabitants per square mile (102/km^{2}). There were 249 housing units at an average density of 138.3 per square mile (53.4/km^{2}).

There were 204 households, of which 155 were family households and 49 were non-family households. Of the family households, 18.6% had children under the age of 18 living with them. 69.1% were a husband-wife family; 2.0% were male householders with no wife present, and 4.9% were female householders with no husband present. 24.0% of all households were made up of individual (non-family) households and 7.8% had someone living alone who was 65 years of age or older. The average household size was 2.36 and the average family size 2.70.

There were 246 females and 236 males. The overall median age was 54.1 years; females 53.8 years; males 54.4 years. 16.4% of the population was under age 18 and 23.9% over age 65. The remaining 59.7% were between 18 and 65 years of age.

Population by age was: 7.9% under 10 years of age; 10.4% from 10 to 19; 7.3% from 20 to 29; 7.5% from 30-39; 10.4% from 40-49; 19.5% from 50 to 59; 24.9% from 60 to 69; and 12.2% who were 70 years of age or older.

The racial makeup of the city was 96.9% White; 2.1% Hispanic; 0.4% African American; 0.4% two or more races; and 0.2% Native American.

The 2010 median income for a household in the city was $56,776. The per capita income for the city was $32,034. About 17.31% of families and 12.11% of the population were below the poverty line.

== Economy ==
Baneberry is known locally and regionally as a resort community on the shores of Douglas Lake. Located in Baneberry is the Baneberry Golf and Resort, which features an 18-hole golf course, swimming pool, tennis courts, and the Baneberry Inn.
