= Tennessee State Route 160 =

State highway in Tennessee

State Route 160
- SR 160; primary in red, secondary in blue

Route information
- Maintained by TDOT
- Length: 27.1 mi (43.6 km)

Major junctions
- North end: US 11E in Morristown
- SR 66 in Morristown; US 25E in Morristown; I-81 in Lowland
- South end: US 321 near Newport

Location
- Country: United States
- State: Tennessee
- Counties: Hamblen, Cocke

Highway system
- Tennessee State Routes; Interstate; US; State
← SR 159	→ SR 161

State Route 160 (SR 160) is a state highway in East Tennessee that has both four-lane expressway and two-lane rural collector sections. It serves as an arterial bypass route of US 11E/SR 34 in the city of Morristown in Hamblen County.

== Route description ==
=== Hamblen County ===
SR 160 begins as a primary highway at an intersection with US 11E/SR 34 (W Andrew Johnson Highway) in a concurrency with SR 342 in Morristown, heading southeastward as a four-lane divided highway, serving essentially as a southern bypass of Morristown. SR 342 (Alpha Valley Home Road) exits after SR 160 curves more eastwardly, and has an intersection with SR 66 (Merchants Greene Boulevard) shortly afterwards. SR 160 continues east to have an interchange with SR 343 (S Cumberland Street) before coming to an interchange with US 25E/SR 32 (S Davy Crockett Parkway; Exit 1 on US 25E). SR 160 then leaves Morristown and has an intersection with SR 113 before coming to an interchange with Interstate 81 (Exit 12 on I-81) in Lowland, where it turns secondary, narrows to two lanes, and continues through farmland before crossing the Nolichucky River into Cocke County.

=== Cocke County ===
SR 160 enters the mountains and passes by Briarwood Ranch Safari Park before passing through Bybee as it exits the mountains and re-enters farmland. The highway then winds its way southeast along the banks of the French Broad River to enter the city of Newport and come to an end at an intersection with US 321/SR 35 east of downtown.

== History ==
Prior to the extension of the highway, SR 160's original northern terminus was at SR 343, also known as South Cumberland Street and Old US Highway 25E. The new four-lane section opened to traffic on October 17, 1990. Passing through a number of hills and valleys, the road required extensive bridges. The first few miles of the highway took over part of SR 342. The four-lane section goes from US 11E in Morristown to 1.7 miles (2.7 km) south of Interstate 81.

== Junction list ==
County	Location	mi	km	Destinations	Notes
Hamblen	Morristown	0.0	0.0	US 11E / SR 342 west/begin (W Andrew Johnson Highway/SR 34) – Jefferson City, Morristown	Northern terminus and Eastern terminus of SR 342; at-grade intersection with traffic signal
Hamblen	Morristown	1.8	2.9	SR 342 east (Alpha Valley Home Road)	Southern end of SR 342 concurrency
Hamblen	Morristown	3.2	5.1	SR 66 (Merchants Greene Boulevard) – White Pine, Dandridge, Morristown	Diamond interchange
Hamblen	Morristown	7.3	11.7	SR 343 (South Cumberland Street) – Morristown	Former northern terminus, interchange; access to downtown Morristown
Hamblen	Morristown	8	13	US 25E (S Davy Crockett Parkway/SR 32) – Bean Station, Tazewell, White Pine, Newport	Partial cloverleaf interchange; US 25E exit 1
Hamblen		10	16	SR 113 (Springvale Road) – White Pine, Whitesburg	at-grade un-signalized intersection
Hamblen	Lowland	11.4	18.3	I-81 – Knoxville, Bristol	I-81 exit 12; southern end of expressway, primary highway classification; northern end of secondary classification
Cocke		27.1	43.6	US 321 (SR 35) – Newport, Greeneville	Southern terminus
1.000 mi = 1.609 km; 1.000 km = 0.621 mi: Concurrency terminus
