= Witt, Tennessee =

- Unincorporated community
- Witt
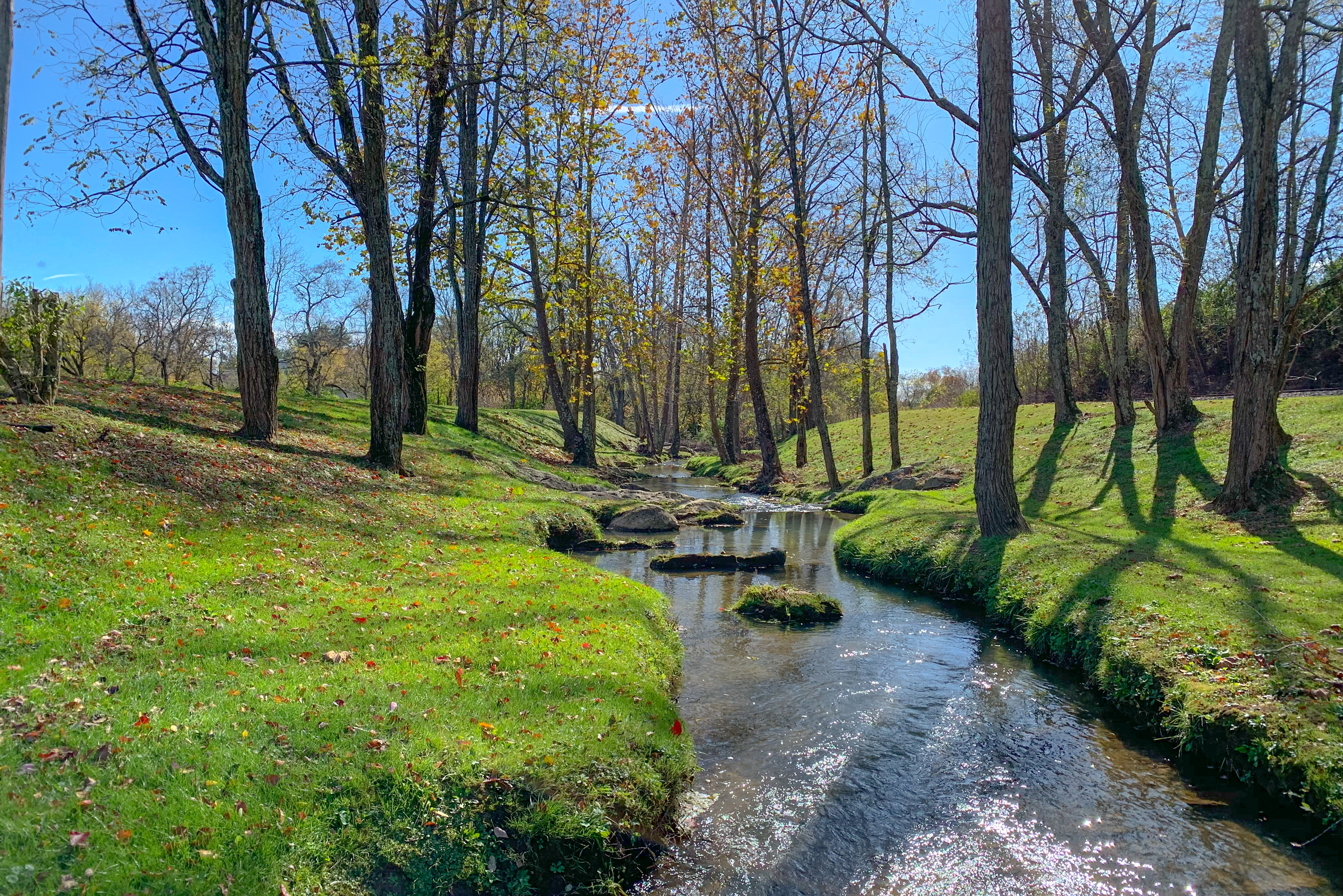
- Sinking Creek in Witt

- Location within Tennessee Location within the United States
- Coordinates: 36°09′0″N 83°16′58″W
- Country: United States
- State: Tennessee
- County: Hamblen
- City: Morristown
- Time zone: UTC-5 (Eastern (EST))
  - Summer (DST): UTC-4 (EDT)
- ZIP code: 37813
- Area code: 423
- GNIS feature ID: 1304642

Witt is an unincorporated community in Hamblen County, Tennessee, United States.

== History ==
Witt was settled by its namesake Caleb Witt, an American Revolutionary War veteran, and at least two of his brothers in 1783 when the area was still known as the State of Franklin. They established Witt's Foundry and a community slowly began to grow. Caleb Witt went on to become a locally well-known pastor until his death in 1827. Witt School was created around 1916 and was replaced by the newly constructed Witt Elementary in 1951. The elementary school is still in use and has had additions to the building in 1968, 1992, and 2001. Witt Elementary School is part of the Hamblen County Board of Education.

== Geography ==
Witt is located near Tennessee State Route 113, Tennessee State Route 32, Interstate 81, and a freight rail route. Other than some parts already annexed by Morristown, Witt is located around 6 miles (9.7 km) south of Morristown's central business district.

== Economy ==
Witt is now primarily used as the site of the East Tennessee Progress Center (ETPC) industrial park. All of the factories and industrial complexes formally in Witt have now been annexed into the larger city of Morristown. Notable companies that have locations in the Witt area of Morristown are International Paper, Kawasaki Tennessee (a subsidiary of Kawasaki Heavy Industries), and Koch Foods.

In 2018, Belgian bus manufacturer Van Hool announced the construction of a 500,000 square feet (46,000 m^{2}) facility at the ETPC, one of the largest industrial development projects in the history of Morristown.
