= List of U.S. Highways in Kentucky =

- Highway markers for U.S. Route 60, U.S. Route 31W, and U.S. Route 421

Highway names
- Interstates: Interstate nn (I-nn)
- US Highways: U.S. Highway nn (US nn)
- State: Kentucky Route nn (KY nn)

System links
- Kentucky State Highway System; Interstate; US; State; Parkways

This is a list of U.S. routes in Kentucky.

== List ==
Number	Length (mi)	Length (km)	Southern or western terminus	Northern or eastern terminus	Formed	Removed	Notes
US 23	157.76	253.89	US 23 at the VA state line	US 23 at the OH state line	1926	current	Also known as the Country Music Highway. It is a designated Kentucky Scenic Byway and an American Byway.
US 25	177.3	285.3	US 25W/US 25E at North Corbin	US 42/US 127 at Covington	1926	current	
US 25W	28	45	US 25W at the TN state line	US 25/US 25E at North Corbin	1926	current	
US 25E	65.9	106.1	US 25E at the TN state line	I-75 at North Corbin	1926	current	
US 27	190.78	307.03	US 27 at the TN state line	US 27 at the OH state line	1926	current	
US 31	0.46	0.74	US 31W/US 31E/US 60 at Louisville	US 31 at the IN state line	1926	current	
US 31W	143.12	230.33	US 31W at the TN state line	US 31/US 31E/US 60 at Louisville	1926	current	
US 31E	140.52	226.15	US 31E/US 231 at the TN state line	US 31/US 31W/US 60 at Louisville	1926	current	
US 37	—	—	Glasgow	Louisville	1934	1952	Existed only on paper and always signed as US 31E along the highway
US 41	148	238	US 41 at the TN state line	US 41 at the IN state line	1926	current	
US 42	105.287	169.443	US 31E/US 60 in Louisville	US 42/US 127 at the OH state line	1926	current	
US 45	51.880	83.493	US 45 at the TN state line	US 45 at the IL state line	1926	current	
US 51	42.155	67.842	I-69/US 51 at the TN state line	US 51/US 60/US 62 at the IL state line	1926	current	
US 52	2	3.2	US 52 / US 119 at the WV state line US 52 / US 119 at the WV state line	US 52 / US 119 at the WV state line US 52 / US 119 at the WV state line	1996	current	
US 60	494.87	796.42	US 51/US 60/US 62 at the IL state line	US 60 at the WV state line	1926	current	
US 62	393	632	US 51/US 60/US 62 at the IL state line	US 62 at the OH state line	1930	current	
US 68	361.96	582.52	US 62 at Reidland	US 68 at the OH state line	1926	current	
US 79	26.80	43.13	US 79 at the TN state line	US 68 at Russellville	1935	current	
US 119	—	—	US 25E at Pineville US 52 / US 119 at the WV state line US 52 / US 119 at the WV state line	US 119 at the WV state line US 52 / US 119 at the WV state line US 52 / US 119 at the WV state line	1926	current	
US 127	207.68	334.23	US 127 at the TN state line	US 42/US 127 at the OH state line	1926	current	
US 150	121	195	I-64/US 150 at the IN state line	US 25 at Mount Vernon	1926	current	
US 168	—	—	Louisville	Mount Vernon	1926	1934	
US 227	120	190	US 25/US 421 in Richmond	US 42/KY 36 in Carrollton	1928	1972	
US 231	114.71	184.61	US 31E/US 231 at the TN state line	US 231 at the IN state line	1926	current	
US 421	272.40	438.39	US 421 at the VA state line	US 421 at the IN state line	1930	current	
US 431	86.93	139.90	US 431 at the TN state line	US 60 in Owensboro	1954	current	
US 460	—	—	US 60/US 421 at Frankfort	US 460 at the VA state line	1933	current	
US 641	69.57	111.96	US 641 at the TN state line	US 60 at Marion	1955	current	
