= Bimble, Kentucky =

Unincorporated community in Kentucky, United States

- Unincorporated community
- Location within Kentucky Location within the United States
- Coordinates: 36°52′30″N 83°49′50″W
- Country: United States
- State: Kentucky
- County: Knox
- Elevation: 1,030 ft (310 m)
- Time zone: UTC-5 (Eastern (EST))
  - Summer (DST): UTC-4 (EST)
- ZIP codes: 40915
- GNIS feature ID: 487321

Bimble is an unincorporated community in Knox County, Kentucky, United States.

The name Bimble was formed by compounding the names of two local farm animals, Bim and Bill. The village was previously known as Yeager until 1966.
