= Frakes, Kentucky =

Unincorporated community in Kentucky, United States

Frakes
- Unincorporated community
- Location within the state of Kentucky Frakes (the United States)
- Coordinates: 36°38′34″N 83°55′40″W
- Country: United States
- State: Kentucky
- County: Bell
- Elevation: 1,489 ft (454 m)
- Time zone: UTC-5 (Eastern (EST))
  - Summer (DST): UTC-4 (EDT)
- ZIP code: 40940
- Area code: 606
- GNIS feature ID: 508032

Frakes is an unincorporated community located in Bell County, Kentucky, United States.

First settled in the 1850s, it was known as South America for its relative remoteness. The community was renamed in the 1930s for the local pastor Hiram Milo Frakes.
