= Kentucky Ridge State Forest =

State forest in Kentucky, United States

- Location within the United States Location within Kentucky
- Nearest city: Pineville, Kentucky
- Coordinates: 36°41′03″N 83°48′25″W
- Area: 15,251 acres (61.72 km^{2})
- Established: 1930
- Governing body: Department of Natural Resources, Division of Forests

Kentucky Ridge State Forest is a state forest in Bell County, Kentucky, United States. The 15,251-acre (61.72 km^{2}) forest was created in 1930 as part of the Land Use and Resettlement Program. In 1954, the United States gave the forest to the state of Kentucky. It contains Pine Mountain State Resort Park.
