= North Corbin, Kentucky =

Census-designated place in Kentucky, United States

- Census-designated place
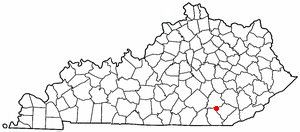
- Location of North Corbin, Kentucky
- Coordinates: 36°57′53″N 84°05′50″W
- Country: United States
- State: Kentucky
- Counties: Laurel, Knox

Area
  - Total: 1.80 sq mi (4.66 km^{2})
  - Land: 1.78 sq mi (4.61 km^{2})
  - Water: 0.019 sq mi (0.05 km^{2})
- Elevation: 1,204 ft (367 m)

Population (2020)
  - Total: 1,727
  - Density: 970.2/sq mi (374.59/km^{2})
- Time zone: UTC-5 (Eastern (EST))
  - Summer (DST): UTC-4 (EDT)
- ZIP Code: 40701 (Corbin)
- Area code: 606
- FIPS code: 21-56694
- GNIS feature ID: 2403345

North Corbin is a census-designated place (CDP) in Laurel and Knox counties in the U.S. state of Kentucky. The population was 1,727 at the 2020 census down from 1,773 at the 2010 census. The census bureau also lists the Laurel County portion of North Corbin as a CCD with a population of 10,729.

The city of Corbin is located south of North Corbin.

The Harland Sanders Café and Museum, the restaurant where Colonel Sanders developed the fried chicken recipe that would later become famous as Kentucky Fried Chicken, is located in the Laurel County portion of North Corbin.

== Geography ==
North Corbin is located in southern Laurel County. A small portion extends east into Knox County. It is bordered to the south by the city of Corbin in Whitley County.

Interstate 75 forms the western edge of the North Corbin CDP, with access from Exit 29, U.S. Route 25E, which forms the northern edge of the CDP. US 25E intersects U.S. Route 25W in North Corbin, forming U.S. Route 25, which leaves town to the north and leads 12 miles (19 km) to London, the Laurel county seat. US 25E leads southeast from North Corbin 16 miles (26 km) to Barbourville, the Knox county seat. US 25W leads south into Corbin and 22 miles (35 km) to Williamsburg, compared to 17 miles (27 km) taking I-75 south. Larger destinations along I-75 include Lexington 85 miles (137 km) to the north and Knoxville, Tennessee, the same distance to the south.

According to the United States Census Bureau, the North Corbin CDP has a total area of 1.80 square miles (4.66 km^{2}), of which 0.02 square miles (0.05 km^{2}), or 1.05%, are water. Lynn Camp Creek forms the southern boundary of the community as well as the Whitley County line. The creek is a west-flowing tributary of the Laurel River and part of the Cumberland River watershed.

== Demographics ==
Historical population
Census	Pop.	Note	%±
2000	1,662		—
2010	1,773		6.7%
2020	1,727		−2.6%
U.S. Decennial Census

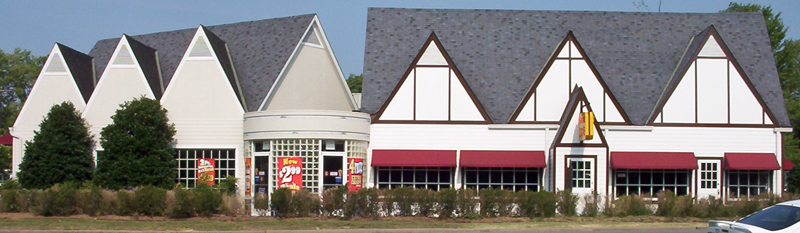
The restaurant where Colonel Sanders developed Kentucky Fried Chicken

=== 2020 census ===
As of the 2020 census, North Corbin had a population of 1,727. The median age was 40.6 years. 21.8% of residents were under the age of 18 and 16.4% of residents were 65 years of age or older. For every 100 females there were 96.5 males, and for every 100 females age 18 and over there were 95.1 males age 18 and over.

100.0% of residents lived in urban areas, while 0.0% lived in rural areas.

There were 725 households in North Corbin, of which 31.9% had children under the age of 18 living in them. Of all households, 40.1% were married-couple households, 18.6% were households with a male householder and no spouse or partner present, and 32.4% were households with a female householder and no spouse or partner present. About 29.1% of all households were made up of individuals and 12.1% had someone living alone who was 65 years of age or older.

There were 833 housing units, of which 13.0% were vacant. The homeowner vacancy rate was 2.0% and the rental vacancy rate was 5.8%.

Racial composition as of the 2020 census
Race	Number	Percent
White	1,579	91.4%
Black or African American	16	0.9%
American Indian and Alaska Native	10	0.6%
Asian	5	0.3%
Native Hawaiian and Other Pacific Islander	0	0.0%
Some other race	15	0.9%
Two or more races	102	5.9%
Hispanic or Latino (of any race)	49	2.8%

=== 2000 census ===
As of the census of 2000, there were 1,662 people, 689 households, and 469 families residing in the CDP. The population density was 913.4 inhabitants per square mile (352.7/km^{2}). There were 774 housing units at an average density of 425.4 per square mile (164.2/km^{2}). The racial makeup of the CDP was 97.41% White, 0.06% African American, 0.60% Native American, 0.24% Pacific Islander, 0.06% from other races, and 1.62% from two or more races. Hispanic or Latino of any race were 0.06% of the population.

There were 689 households, out of which 29.6% had children under the age of 18 living with them, 50.9% were married couples living together, 14.2% had a female householder with no husband present, and 31.8% were non-families. 27.6% of all households were made up of individuals, and 10.0% had someone living alone who was 65 years of age or older. The average household size was 2.41 and the average family size was 2.94.

In the CDP, the population was spread out, with 24.8% under the age of 18, 8.0% from 18 to 24, 28.9% from 25 to 44, 26.5% from 45 to 64, and 11.7% who were 65 years of age or older. The median age was 36 years. For every 100 females, there were 87.0 males. For every 100 females age 18 and over, there were 88.4 males.

The median income for a household in the CDP was $25,756, and the median income for a family was $27,389. Males had a median income of $26,912 versus $20,000 for females. The per capita income for the CDP was $11,104. About 26.6% of families and 33.5% of the population were below the poverty line, including 58.2% of those under age 18 and 8.7% of those age 65 or over.
