= Corbin micropolitan area, Kentucky =

Micropolitan area in Eastern Kentucky

Coordinates: 37°00′N 84°05′W

Corbin, KY Middlesborough–Corbin, KY Combined Statistical Area
- Combined Statistical Area
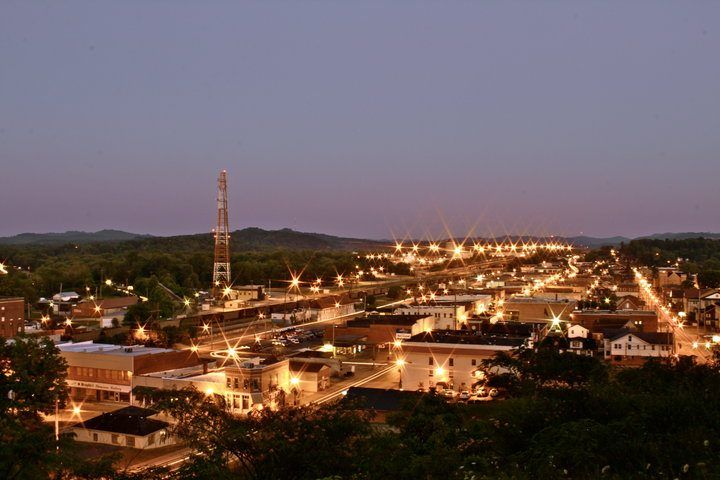
- Downtown Corbin, Kentucky, from North Kentucky Street, looking South down Main Street
Map of Middlesborough–Corbin, KY CSA
City of Corbin
City of London
Corbin, KY μSA
Middlesborough, KY μSA
City of Middlesborough
City of Pineville
- Country: United States
- State: Kentucky
- Principal city: Corbin
- Largest city: Corbin
- Other cities: Williamsburg; Barbourville; Manchester; Middlesborough
- Time zone: UTC−5 (EST)
  - Summer (DST): UTC−4 (EDT)

The Corbin, Kentucky Micropolitan Area (formerly London, Kentucky) Micropolitan Area (μSA) is made up of four counties in the Eastern Coalfield region of Kentucky. Before 2013, the area was officially known as the Corbin–London, KY Combined Statistical Area, and consisted of the Corbin Micropolitan Statistical Area and the London Micropolitan Statistical Area. The Corbin micropolitan area consisted of Whitley County, and the London micropolitan area consisted of Laurel County.

In 2013, the United States Census Bureau folded the CSA into the redefined London micropolitan area, and Knox County was added to the statistical area. This incidentally ended a statistical anomaly that excluded the 20% of the population of Corbin living in Knox County from the statistical area.

As of 2019, the London micropolitan area had a population of 128,215.

The total population of the London, KY μSA changed from 126,565 in 2010 to 128,215 in 2018, a change of 1,650 (1.3%). Among all metros nationwide, London, KY μSA ranked 386th in 2018, based on total population. It ranked 319th based population change from 2010 to 2018 and ranked 456th based population percent change from 2010 to 2018.

With the release of the 2023 Statistical Area definitions, the London micropolitan area was renamed Corbin micropolitan area and Clay County was added to the μSA.

== Counties ==
- Clay
- Knox
- Laurel
- Whitley

== Communities ==
=== Incorporated places ===
- Barbourville (Knox)
- Corbin (Whitley, Laurel, and Knox)
- London (Laurel)
- Williamsburg (Whitley)

=== Census-designated places ===
Note: All census-designated places are unincorporated.

==== Knox County ====
- Artemus
- Flat Lick
- North Corbin (part)

==== Laurel County ====
- London
- East Bernstadt
- North Corbin (part)

==== Whitley County ====
- Emlyn
- Pleasant View
- Rockholds

=== Unincorporated places ===
==== Knox County ====
- Bimble
- Bryants Store
- Cannon
- Crane Nest
- Dewitt
- Girdler
- Green Road
- Heidrick
- Himyar
- Hinkle
- Kayjay
- Mills
- Powers Coal Camp
- Salt Gum
- Scalf
- The Forks of Stinking
- Trosper
- Walker
- Warren
- Watch
- Woollum

==== Laurel County ====
- Atlanta
- Bernstadt
- Boreing
- Buch
- Bush
- Cruise
- Keavy
- Lake
- Lily
- Pittsburg
- Sublimity City
- Symbol

==== Whitley County ====
- Carpenter
- Dixie
- Gatliff
- Goldbug
- Julip
- Lot
- Louden Coal Camp
- Lucky
- Mountain Ash
- Nevisdale
- Rain
- Red Ash Coal Camp
- Redbird
- Saxton
- Scuffletown
- Watts Creek Jellico Coal Company
- Wofford
- Woodbine
- Yaden

== Demographics ==
As of the census of 2000, there were 88,580 people, 34,163 households, and 25,414 families residing within the CSA. The racial makeup of the CSA was 97.66% White, 0.6% African American, 0.2% Native American, 0.3% Asian, 0.002% Pacific Islander, 0.2% from other races, and 1.0% from two or more races. Hispanics or Latinos of any race were 1.1% of the population.

The median income for a household in the CSA was $25,254, and the median income for a family was $30,193. Males had a median income of $21,507 versus $15,031 for females. The per capita income for the CSA was $13,603.

== See also ==
- Kentucky census statistical areas
- List of cities in Kentucky
