= Kentucky Route 225 =

State highway in Kentucky, United States

Kentucky Route 225
- KY 225 highlighted in red

Route information
- Maintained by KYTC
- Length: 16.4 mi (26.4 km)

Major junctions
- South end: KY 92 southwest of Ingram
- KY 930 in Artemus
- North end: US 25E / KY 3439 in Barbourville

Location
- Country: United States
- State: Kentucky
- Counties: Bell, Knox

Highway system
- Kentucky State Highway System; Interstate; US; State; Parkways
← KY 224	→ KY 226

Kentucky Route 225 (KY 225) is a 16.4-mile-long (26.4 km) state highway in the U.S. state of Kentucky. The highway connects mostly rural areas of Bell and Knox counties with Barbourville.

== Route description ==
KY 225 begins at an intersection with KY 92 southwest of Ingram, within Bell County. It travels to the northwest and immediately crosses over Greasy Creek. It winds its way to the northwest, enters Knox County, and travels through Wheeler. It curves to the north-northwest and enters Kayjay. There, it crosses over Tye Fork, curves to the east, and crosses over Tye Fork again. The highway begins paralleling the fork and curves to a northeast direction. Then, it curves to the north and passes Tinsley Cemetery before curving to the west-northwest and traveling through Trosper. It curves to the north and passes Burch Cemetery. KY 225 curves to the northeast and crosses Owens Branch. The highway curves to the north-northwest and crosses over Gregory Branch and Cumberland River. It then enters Artemus, where it crosses over some CSX railroad tracks and intersects the western terminus of KY 930. It heads to the northwest, paralleling those railroad tracks. It curves to the north-northwest, crosses over Fighting Creek, and enters Barbourville. It passes the Knox County Hospital and curves to the north-northeast. It passes Barbourville Cemetery. On the northeastern edge of the cemetery, it intersects the southern terminus of KY 2421 (Cumberland Avenue). At this same intersection, KY 225 heads to the southeast, curves to the northeast, and meets its northern terminus, an intersection with U.S. Route 25E (Cumberland Gap Parkway). Here, the roadway continues as the western end of KY 3439.

== Major intersections ==
County	Location	mi	km	Destinations	Notes
Bell		0.0	0.0	KY 92 – Williamsburg, Pineville	Southern terminus
Knox	Artemus	13.3	21.4	KY 930 east	Western terminus of KY 930
Knox	Barbourville	16.1	25.9	KY 2421 north (Cumberland Avenue)	Southern terminus of KY 2421
Knox	Barbourville	16.4	26.4	US 25E (Cumberland Gap Parkway) / KY 3439 east – Pineville, Corbin	Northern terminus of KY 225; western terminus of KY 3439
1.000 mi = 1.609 km; 1.000 km = 0.621 mi
