= Kentucky Route 3041 =

Highway in Kentucky, United States

Kentucky Route 3041
- Corbin Bypass
- KY 3041 highlighted in red

Route information
- Maintained by KYTC
- Length: 5.700 mi (9.173 km)

Major junctions
- West end: US 25W in Corbin
- East end: US 25E in Corbin

Location
- Country: United States
- State: Kentucky
- Counties: Whitley, Knox

Highway system
- Kentucky State Highway System; Interstate; US; State; Parkways
← KY 3040	→ KY 3042

Kentucky Route 3041 (KY 3041) is a state highway in the southeastern part of the U.S. state of Kentucky. Known as the Corbin Bypass, the route runs 5.700 miles (9.173 km) from U.S. Route 25W (US 25W) east and north to US 25E within Corbin. KY 3041 provides a southeastern bypass of the center of Corbin through eastern Whitley County and western Knox County. The bypass was planned starting in the late 1980s and was constructed in three stages in the mid-1990s. KY 3041 eased congestion in downtown Corbin and stimulated educational and industrial development in the late 1990s.

== Route description ==
KY 3041 begins at US 25W (Cumberland Falls Highway) east of the U.S. Highway's interchange with Interstate 75 southwest of downtown Corbin in the Whitley County portion of the city. The bypass heads east across Bacon Creek and intersects a two-way ramp connector with KY 26 (South Main Street). East of the connector, KY 3041 crosses over KY 26 and a CSX rail line. On a second bridge, the highway crosses Lynn Camp Creek, a tributary of the Laurel River, and enters Knox County. KY 3041 meets the north end of KY 3606 (Woodbine Connector) before curving north and paralleling Youngs Creek. The highway intersects a connector road to the parallel KY 830 (Right Fork East Creek Road), crosses over the East Fork Lynn Camp Creek, another CSX rail line, and the road carrying KY 830 and KY 1232. After the bridge, KY 3041 meets the west end of KY 2417, which connects the bypass with KY 830 and KY 1232. North of KY 2417, the bypass reaches its northern terminus at US 25E (Cumberland Gap Parkway) east of downtown Corbin.

All of KY 3041 is part of the National Highway System. The Kentucky Transportation Cabinet classifies the highway as part of the state primary classification of the state primary road system for its entire length. KY 3041 is in the city of Corbin for its entire course; for most of its length, the city limits form a narrow corridor around KY 3041.

== History ==
By 1988, local and regional business leaders in southeastern Kentucky had stated the need for a southern bypass of Corbin to stimulate industrial and business development and help connect parts of southeastern Kentucky to the Interstate Highway System. Later that year, the state postponed a project in downtown Corbin for 2 to 3 years and started design work on a 1.2-mile-long (1.9 km) section of the Corbin Bypass from US 25E south to an industrial park to ease congestion in Corbin and stimulate development. After the first 1.6-mile-long (2.6 km) segment of the bypass opened in Knox County, the Kentucky Transportation Cabinet designated the new bypass KY 3041 through a May 5, 1994, official order. The agency extended KY 3041 along the remaining 4.1 miles (6.6 km) of the bypass in Knox and Whitley counties through a pair of May 19, 1997, official orders. The completion of the bypass stimulated state-funded institutional development beginning in 1998. That year, Eastern Kentucky University and the Kentucky Community and Technical College System agreed to jointly build a satellite campus along the bypass. In addition, five counties—Knox, Whitley, Clay, McCreary, and Bell—agreed to establish the Southeast Kentucky Industrial Development Authority to receive state funding for establishing an industrial park on the Corbin Bypass. The authority gave assurances that the new industrial park, which would have infrastructure in place for businesses to move in by the end of 1999, would not take business away from the Tri-County Industrial Park already located on the bypass.

== Junction list ==
The entire route is in Corbin.

County	mi	km	Destinations	Notes
Whitley	0.000	0.000	US 25W (Cumberland Falls Highway) to I-75 – Cumberland Falls	Southern terminus
Whitley	1.440	2.317	To KY 26 (South Main Street) – Woodbine	Two-way ramp between KY 26 and KY 3041
Knox	2.361	3.800	KY 3606 south (Woodbine Connector) – Woodbine	
Knox	5.124	8.246	To KY 830 (Right Fork East Creek Road)	Two-way ramp between KY 830 and KY 3041
Knox	5.527	8.895	KY 2417 west to KY 1232	
Knox	5.700	9.173	US 25E (Cumberland Gap Parkway) – Barbourville	Northern terminus
1.000 mi = 1.609 km; 1.000 km = 0.621 mi
