= Kentucky Route 6 =

State highway in Kentucky

Kentucky Route 6
- KY 6 highlighted in red

Route information
- Maintained by KYTC
- Length: 16.380 mi (26.361 km)

Major junctions
- West end: KY 26 in Woodbine
- East end: KY 11 / KY 459 in Barbourville

Location
- Country: United States
- State: Kentucky
- Counties: Whitley, Knox

Highway system
- Kentucky State Highway System; Interstate; US; State; Parkways
← KY 5	→ KY 7

Kentucky Route 6 (KY 6) is a 16.380-mile-long (26.361 km) east–west state highway in Kentucky. The western terminus is at a junction with KY 26, north of Woodbine in Whitley County, and the eastern terminus is at a junction with KY 11 and KY 459 in Barbourville in Knox County.

== Route description ==
KY 6 begins at an intersection with KY 26 in Woodbine, Whitley County, heading southeast as a two-lane undivided road that immediately crosses a CSX railroad line. After the railroad tracks, the route turns to the southwest for a short distance before heading to the southeast along Barbourville Road. KY 6 passes homes and some businesses before leaving Woodbine. The road heads into a mix of fields and woods with some homes, intersecting the southern terminus of KY 3606 before reaching a junction with the northern terminus of KY 1064. The route heads through more rural areas and curves to the east, crossing into Knox County.

KY 6 intersects the southern terminus of KY 3436 and heads southeast into forests, where it passes to the northeast of Wilton Lake. The road heads south before it curves to the southeast. The route turns to the northeast and passes through more woodland with some fields and homes. KY 6 heads east before it continues southeast and intersects the southern terminus of KY 233. The road continues southeast to an intersection with the western terminus of KY 459, at which point it turns to the northeast. The route passes through more forests and winds to the east. Farther east, KY 6 heads into Barbourville and becomes North Main Street, passing homes. The road heads to the southeast and comes to an intersection with the southern terminus of KY 1487. The route passes more residences and some businesses before it heads into the downtown area of Barbourville, where it circles around the Knox County Courthouse on Court Square. KY 6 continues south one block along South Main Street before it comes to its eastern terminus at an intersection with KY 11 and KY 459. Past this intersection, South Main Street continues as part of KY 11.

== Major intersections ==
County	Location	mi	km	Destinations	Notes
Whitley	Woodbine	0.000	0.000	KY 26 (Williamsburg Road)	Western terminus
Whitley	Woodbine	0.583	0.938	KY 3606 north	Southern terminus of KY 3606
Whitley	Woodbine	0.792	1.275	KY 1064 south (Meadow Creek Road)	Northern terminus of KY 1064
Knox		2.752	4.429	KY 3436 north (Liberty Road)	Southern terminus of KY 3436
Knox		8.401	13.520	KY 233 north (Big Indian Road)	Southern terminus of KY 233
Knox		9.610	15.466	KY 459 east	Western terminus of KY 459
Knox	Barbourville	15.859	25.523	KY 1487 north (Manchester Street)	Southern terminus of KY 1487
Knox	Barbourville	16.380	26.361	KY 11 / KY 459 west (Daniel Boone Drive/South Main Street)	Eastern terminus, eastern terminus of KY 459
1.000 mi = 1.609 km; 1.000 km = 0.621 mi
