= London micropolitan area, Kentucky =

Map highlighting the London, KY Micropolitan Statistical Area.

The London, KY Micropolitan Statistical Area is a United States Census Bureau defined micropolitan statistical area located in the vicinity of London, Kentucky. The London Micropolitan Statistical Area encompasses Laurel County entirely. The Micropolitan Statistical Area had a population of 52,715 at the 2000 census. A July 1, 2009 U.S. Census Bureau estimate placed the population at 57,749.

The London Micropolitan Statistical Area is part of the Corbin-London, KY Combined Statistical Area, which also contains the Corbin, KY Micropolitan Statistical Area.

== Communities ==
=== Incorporated places ===
- London (Principal city)

=== Census-designated places ===
Note: All census-designated places are unincorporated.

- East Bernstadt
- North Corbin

=== Unincorporated places ===
- Atlanta
- Lake

== Demographics ==
As of the census of 2000, there were 52,715 people, 20,353 households, and 15,366 families residing in the μSA. There were 22,317 housing units at an average density of 51 per square mile (20/km^{2}). The racial makeup of the county was 97.66% White, 0.63% Black or African American, 0.37% Native American, 0.35% Asian, 0.01% Pacific Islander, 0.08% from other races, and 0.90% from two or more races. 0.55% of the population were Hispanic or Latino of any race.

The median income for a household in the μSA was $27,015, and the median income for a family was $31,318. Males had a median income of $27,965 versus $19,757 for females. The per capita income for the μSA was $14,165.
