= Green Road =

Green Road may refer to:

- Green Road, Kentucky, an unincorporated community within Knox County, Kentucky
- Green Road railway station, a request stop on the Cumbrian Coast Line in north-western England
- SMK Green Road, a public English-medium secondary school in Kuching, Sarawak, Malaysia
- The Green Road (Enright novel), a 2015 novel by Irish author Anne Enright
- Green Road station, on the RTA Rapid Transit system in Ohio, United States

== See also ==
- Green Lane (disambiguation)
- Green Lanes (disambiguation)
- Green Street (disambiguation)
