= Kentucky Route 26 =

State highway in Kentucky, United States

Kentucky Route 26
- KY 26 highlighted in red

Route information
- Maintained by KYTC
- Length: 14.319 mi (23.044 km)

Major junctions
- South end: US 25W near Williamsburg
- North end: US 25W in Corbin

Location
- Country: United States
- State: Kentucky
- Counties: Whitley

Highway system
- Kentucky State Highway System; Interstate; US; State; Parkways
← US 25	→ US 27

Kentucky Route 26 (KY 26) serves as a shorter alternate route for traffic using US 25W between Williamsburg and Corbin in Whitley County. The southern terminus of KY 26 is at US 25W north of Williamsburg, and its northern terminus is also at US 25W, this time in Corbin. Traveling from Williamsburg, while US 25W treks northwesterly past I-75 in the direction of Cumberland Falls State Resort Park, then comes back in a northeasterly direction, crossing I-75 again on the way into Corbin, KY 26 stays on the east side of I-75 for its entirety, providing a more direct path between the two cities.

== Route description ==
KY 26 begins at an intersection with US 25W north of Williamsburg in Whitley County, heading northeast as a two-lane undivided road. The route heads through wooded areas with some fields and residences, coming to a junction with the western terminus of KY 779. The road curves north through more rural areas and passes through Wofford before crossing a CSX railroad line. KY 26 turns northeast and heads through more forested areas, where it comes to an intersection with the southern terminus of KY 2985. The road heads to the north and continues through woodland with some fields. The route passes through more rural areas with some development and runs a short distance to the west of the railroad tracks. KY 26 curves northeast and intersects the eastern terminus of KY 511 in the community of Rockholds. A short distance later, the road comes to a junction with the western terminus of KY 3423.

The route heads to the north and crosses the CSX line to run along the east side of it, passing through more forested areas with some fields and development. KY 26 passes through more rural areas and curves to the northwest, making a turn to the north and passing under the railroad tracks. The road continues to the northeast and runs along the northwest side of the CSX line. The route heads into Woodbine and passes near homes, where it intersects the western terminus of KY 6. KY 26 curves north and heads back into rural areas as Williamsburg Road, where it passes under KY 3041. The road heads into Corbin and becomes South Main Street, heading through industrial and business areas. The route passes through more residential and commercial areas and comes to its northern terminus at another intersection with US 25W. North of here, South Main Street continues as part of US 25W.

== Major intersections ==
The entire route is in Whitley County.

Location	mi	km	Destinations	Notes
Williamsburg	0.000	0.000	US 25W (Cumberland Falls Highway) to I-75 – Williamsburg, Cumberland Falls State Resort Park	Southern terminus
	0.924	1.487	KY 779 east (Browns Creek Road)	Western terminus of KY 779
	2.177	3.504	KY 2985 north (New Zion Road)	Southern terminus of KY 2985
Rockholds	5.048	8.124	KY 511 west	Eastern terminus of KY 511
Rockholds	5.203	8.373	KY 3423 east (Tyes Ferry Road)	Western terminus of KY 3423
Woodbine	12.256	19.724	KY 6 east – Barbourville	Western terminus of KY 6
Corbin	14.319	23.044	US 25W (18th Street/South Main Street)	Northern terminus
1.000 mi = 1.609 km; 1.000 km = 0.621 mi
