= Ensley A. Carpenter =

Doctor, postmaster

Ensley A. Carpenter (about 1819 – before 1910), was a country doctor for whom the town of Carpenter, Kentucky was named. He moved to Whitley County, Kentucky shortly after the American Civil War from neighboring Claiborne County, Tennessee. Carpenter practiced medicine in Whitley County, Bell County, Kentucky, and Knox County, Kentucky from about 1868 into the early 1900s.

The town of Carpenter, Kentucky, where he was the postmaster and town doctor, was named after him.
