= Firewatch (disambiguation) =

Firewatch is a 2016 video game by Campo Santo.

Firewatch or fire watch may also refer to:

== Firefighting, forestry and military ==
- Another term for a fire lookout
- A colloquialism for sentry duty in the United States Marine Corps, see General Orders for Sentries
- if fire protection systems are out of service and a representative of the fire marshal's office must be present, this is called "on fire watch"

== Entertainment ==
- Fire Watch (book), 1984 collection of short stories by Connie Willis
  - "Fire Watch" (short story), the title story in the Connie Willis book

== See also ==
- Fire (disambiguation)
- Watch (disambiguation)
