= Sublime =

Sublime may refer to:

== Theory ==
- Sublime (literary), use of language that excites emotions beyond ordinary experience
- Sublime (philosophy), the quality of greatness

== Entertainment ==
=== Music ===
- SubLime FM, a Dutch radio station dedicated to jazz
- Sublime (band), an American ska punk band
  - Sublime (album), 1996
- Sublime with Rome, briefly known as Sublime, an American musical group
- "Sublime" (song), a 2002 single by Shakaya
- Sub•Lime Records, an imprint of Essential Records

=== Film ===
- Sublime (2007 film), an American horror film
- Sublime (2022 film), an Argentine film

=== Print ===
- Sublime Magazine, a sustainability magazine
- Sublime (Marvel Comics), a comic book character
- SuBLime, a comic imprint of Viz Media for BL manga

== Other uses ==
- Sublime, Texas, a place in the U.S.
- Sublime number, in number theory
- Sublime Text, a source code editor

== See also ==
- Sublimity (disambiguation)
- Sublimation (disambiguation)
