= Sublimity (disambiguation) =

Sublimity is a concept in philosophy.

Sublimity may also refer to:

- Sublimity City, Kentucky, U.S.
- Sublimity, Oregon, U.S.
- Sublimity (album), by Transmission, 2008
- Sublimity (horse) (foaled 2000)

== See also ==
- Sublime (disambiguation)
- Sublimation (disambiguation)
