= Cranes Nest =

Cranes Nest and Crane Nest may refer to:

- Crane Nest, Kentucky
- Cranes Nest, Virginia
- Cranes Nest River, Virginia
