= Appalachian Children's Home =

Coordinates: 36.8691°N 83.8476°W

The Appalachian Children's Home is a home for at-risk children, located on a 158-acre (0.64 km^{2}) campus on the outskirts of Barbourville, Kentucky. It is operated as a Christian ministry with support from several Independent Pentecostal churches in Kentucky and more than 130 other regional churches.

Its stated mission is to "Strive to provide the best possible care available for the children placed in our custody".

== History ==
The home was established in 1949 as a ministry of the Independent Pentecostal Churches. It was formerly called the Barbourville Pentecostal Children's Home. Since 2001 it has been operated by Steve and Alice Yeary.

== Licensing ==
The home is licensed by the State of Kentucky Cabinet for Health and Family Services as a child-caring institution and emergency shelter for up to 44 boys and girls under the age of 18.

== Knox Appalachian School ==
The Knox Appalachian School is a public school founded in 2004 as a joint venture between the Appalachian Children's Home and the Knox County Board of Education to serve the children committed to the Children's Home. It has five certified public school teachers and a Title One Coordinator. It provides instruction from grades 5 to 12. Special education services are offered on-site by a certified special education teacher. One of the most technologically advanced schools in the area, the school is the site of a pilot program for the Plato Learning System, based on individual learning. Its students have opportunities for educational travel on a 60-passenger tour bus to sites such as the Gatlinburg aquarium, visits by Kentucky historical reenactment specialists, and career days to learn about possible employment opportunities.
