= Slick Lizard Coal Camp, Kentucky =

Unincorporated community in Kentucky, United States

Slick Lizard Coal Camp
- Unincorporated community
- Location within Kentucky Location within the United States
- Coordinates: 36°53′46″N 83°51′52″W
- Country: United States
- State: Kentucky
- County: Knox
- Elevation: 1,033 ft (315 m)
- Time zone: UTC-5 (Eastern (EST))
  - Summer (DST): UTC-4 (EDT)
- GNIS feature ID: 2543344

Slick Lizard Coal Camp was an unincorporated community and coal town in Knox County, Kentucky, United States.
