= Mountain Ash =

Mountain Ash may refer to:

== Places ==
- Mountain Ash, Rhondda Cynon Taf, a town in Wales
  - Mountain Ash railway station
  - Mountain Ash RFC, a rugby union club
- Mountain Ash, Kentucky, a town in the U.S.

== See also ==
- Mountain ash (disambiguation)
