= Tom Smith (Kentucky politician) =

American politician

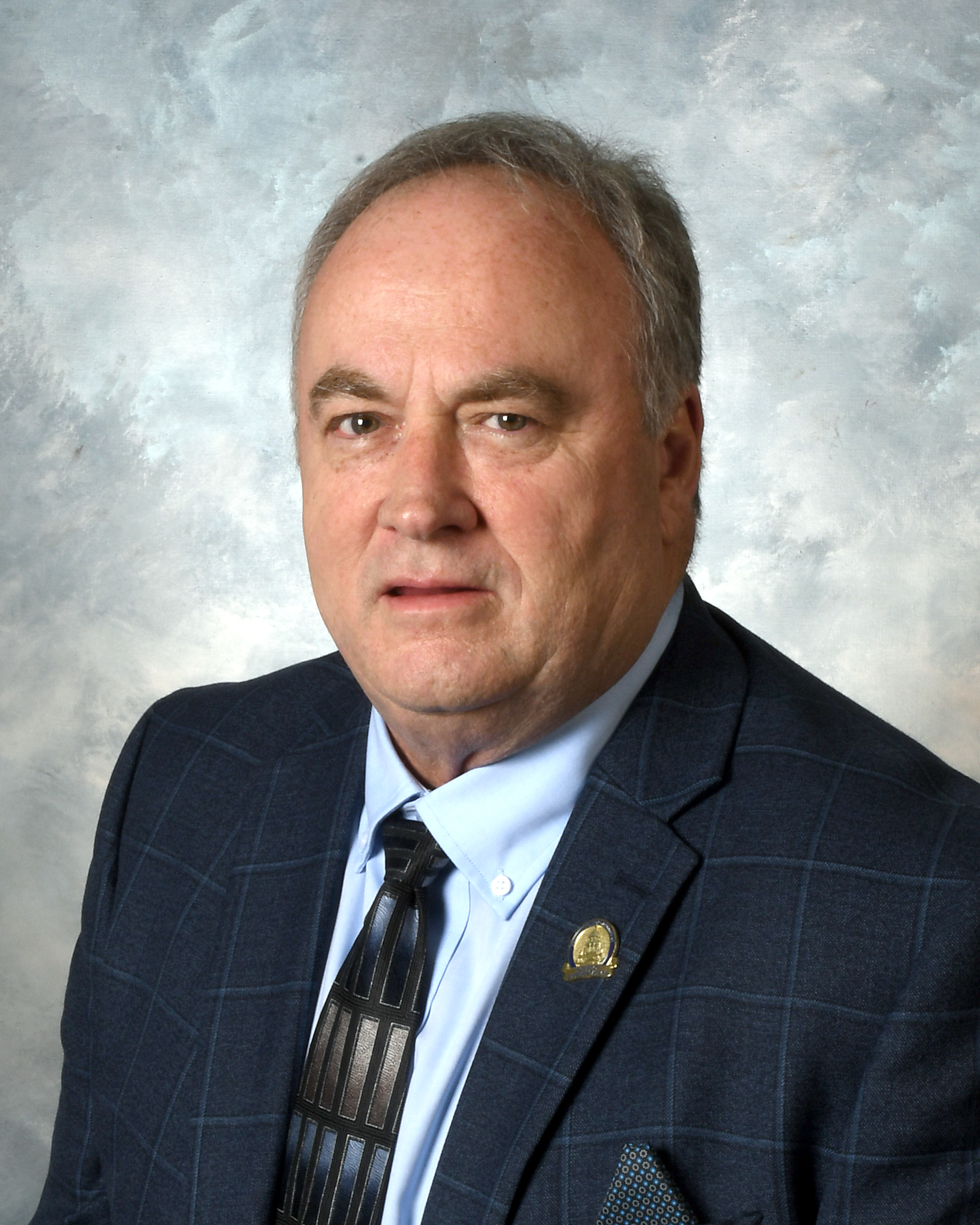

Member of the Kentucky House of Representatives from the 86th district
- Incumbent
- Assumed office January 1, 2021
- Preceded by: Jim Stewart
- In office January 1, 1991 – April 30, 1993
- Preceded by: Caroline White
- Succeeded by: Elbert Hampton

Personal details
- Born: November 20, 1958 (age 67) Barbourville, Kentucky
- Committees: Licensing, Occupations, & Administrative Regulations (Vice Chair); Banking & Insurance; Natural Resources & Energy; Transportation

Tom O'Dell Smith (born November 20, 1958) is an American politician who has served as a Republican member of the Kentucky House of Representatives from Kentucky's 86th House district since January 2021. His district includes Knox County and part of Laurel County. He previously represented the district from 1991 to 1993, but he resigned following his conviction of extortion. He served 27 months in prison.

== Background ==
Smith was born in Barbourville, Kentucky, and attended Williamsburg High School. Currently, Smith holds numerous business interests and works as a consultant.

== Political career ==
=== Operation Crabgrass ===
During the early 1990s, the Federal Bureau of Investigation (FBI) launched Operation BOPTROT in an effort to investigate allegations of corruption involving the state legislature of Kentucky. Alongside BOPTROT, the FBI also initiated Operation Crabgrass in an effort to investigate allegations specifically centered in Eastern Kentucky.

On September 15, 1992, U.S. Attorney for the Eastern District of Kentucky Karen Caldwell and the FBI announced in a press conference that Smith had been indicted on three felony counts of extortion and one count of obstruction of justice. According to the indictment, Smith had extorted a total of $13,750 from Theresa Brown, the wife of a convicted drug dealer, in exchange for obtaining an early release for her husband. Smith intended the money to be contributed to the 1991 Kentucky gubernatorial election campaign of U.S. Representative Larry Hopkins. Smith contested the charges throughout the proceedings, initially claiming that they were politically motivated given their proximity to that November's election. Later, Smith claimed that he was entrapped by the FBI with their intent being to use Smith to provide aid to investigations against his fellow lawmakers.

On March 30, 1993, Smith was found guilty on two of the three extortion charges and was found not guilty on one count of obstruction. On April 30, Smith resigned his position as a state legislator and on July 2, he was sentenced to 27 months in federal prison. In 1997, Governor Paul Patton issued a proclamation restoring Smith's civil rights and granting him the ability to vote despite his felony convictions.

=== Elections ===
- 1990 Smith won the 1990 Republican primary for Kentucky's 86th House district with 805 votes (69.4%) and won the 1990 Kentucky House of Representatives election with 4,188 votes (50.3%) against Democratic incumbent Caroline White.
- 1992 Smith won the 1992 Republican primary with 1,561 votes (67.9%) and won the 1992 Kentucky House of Representatives election with 5,377 votes (51.2%) against Democratic candidate Caroline White.
- 2020 Incumbent representative Jim Stewart chose not to seek reelection. Smith won the 2020 Republican primary with 2,739 votes (38.2%) and was unopposed in the 2020 Kentucky House of Representatives election, winning with 16,677 votes.
- 2022 Smith won the 2022 Republican primary with 4,367 votes (76.5%) and was unopposed in the 2022 Kentucky House of Representatives election, winning with 9,142 votes.
- 2024 Smith won the 2024 Republican primary with 2,913 votes (63%) against challenger Billy Taylor, and was unopposed in the 2024 Kentucky House of Representatives election, winning with 15,285 votes.
