= Heidrick =

Heidrick may refer to:

- Heidrick, Kentucky, an unincorporated community located in Knox County
- Emmet Heidrick (1876–1916), American baseball outfielder
