= Dixie, Kentucky =

Dixie, Kentucky may refer to the following places in the U.S. state of Kentucky:

- Dixie, Henderson County, Kentucky, an unincorporated community
- Dixie, Whitley County, Kentucky, an unincorporated community
