= Louden Coal Camp, Kentucky =

Unincorporated community in Kentucky, United States

Louden Coal Camp
- Unincorporated community
- Location within the state of Kentucky Louden Coal Camp (the United States)
- Coordinates: 36°45′2″N 84°1′44″W
- Country: United States
- State: Kentucky
- County: Whitley
- Elevation: 948 ft (289 m)
- Time zone: UTC-6 (Central (CST))
  - Summer (DST): UTC-5 (CST)
- GNIS feature ID: 2710201

Louden Coal Camp was an unincorporated community and coal town located in Whitley County, Kentucky, United States.
