= Stinking Creek (Kentucky) =

Stream in Knox County, Kentucky, U.S.

Coordinates: 36.837587°N 83.816033°W

Stinking Creek is a stream in Knox County, Kentucky, in the United States.

Stinking Creek was so named because early buffalo hunters were known to leave corpses of animals they killed lying in and around the stream.

== See also ==
- List of rivers of Kentucky
