= Lucky, Kentucky =

Unincorporated community in Kentucky, United States

Lucky
- Unincorporated community
- Location within the state of Kentucky Lucky (the United States)
- Coordinates: 36°44′13″N 84°4′20″W
- Country: United States
- State: Kentucky
- County: Whitley
- Elevation: 981 ft (299 m)
- Time zone: UTC-6 (Central (CST))
  - Summer (DST): UTC-5 (CST)
- GNIS feature ID: 513725

Lucky is an unincorporated community located in Whitley County, Kentucky, United States.
