= Rain, Kentucky =

Unincorporated community in Kentucky, United States

Rain
- Unincorporated community
- Location within the state of Kentucky Rain (the United States)
- Coordinates: 36°43′14″N 83°56′42″W
- Country: United States
- State: Kentucky
- County: Whitley
- Elevation: 1,037 ft (316 m)
- Time zone: UTC-6 (Central (CST))
  - Summer (DST): UTC-5 (CST)
- GNIS feature ID: 508894

Rain is an unincorporated community located in Whitley County, Kentucky, United States.

The origin of the name "Rain" is obscure.
