= Red Ash Coal Camp, Kentucky =

Unincorporated community in Kentucky, United States

Red Ash Coal Camp
- Unincorporated community
- Location within the state of Kentucky Red Ash Coal Camp (the United States)
- Coordinates: 36°35′57″N 84°10′10″W
- Country: United States
- State: Kentucky
- County: Whitley
- Elevation: 1,063 ft (324 m)
- Time zone: UTC-6 (Central (CST))
  - Summer (DST): UTC-5 (CST)
- GNIS feature ID: 2710205

Red Ash Coal Camp was an unincorporated community and coal town located in Whitley County, Kentucky, United States.
