= Watcher =

Watcher or Watchers may refer to:

== In print ==
=== Books ===
- Watcher, a 1997 World of Darkness novel by Charles L. Grant
- Watcher, a 2012 novel by L.A. Weatherly
- Watchers (novel), a 1987 novel by Dean Koontz
- Watchers, a 1998-99 series of novels by Peter Lerangis
- Watchers, a 2013 novel by Philip Caveney
- The Watcher and Other Weird Stories, an 1894 short story collection by Sheridan Le Fanu
  - "The Watcher", an 1847 short story by Le Fanu
- The Watcher, a 1936 novel by Gerald Verner
- The Watcher, a 1959 novel by Dolores Hitchens
- The Watcher and Other Stories, a 1971 short story collection by Italo Calvino
- The Watcher, a 1978 Frank Hastings novel by Collin Wilcox
- The Watcher, a 1981 novel by Kay Nolte Smith
- The Watcher, a 1982 novel by J. Robert Janes
- The Watcher, a 1986 speculative fiction novel by Jane Palmer
- The Watcher, a 1994 novel in the Point Horror series by Lael Littke
- The Watcher, a 1997 novel by James Howe
- The Watcher, a 1999 novel by Melinda Metz, the fourth installment in the Roswell High series
- The Watcher, a 2000 novel by Margaret Buffie, the first installment in the Watcher's Quest trilogy
- The Watcher, a 2004-20 series of novels Lilith Saintcrow
- The Watcher, a 2007 novel by Jeanne C. Stein, the third installment in the Anna Strong, Vampire series
- In the Dark, a 2008 Jonathan Stride novel by Brian Freeman, published in the UK as The Watcher
- The Watcher, a 2008 novel by Beverly Barton
- The Watcher, a 2011 novel by Charlotte Link
- The Watchers, an 1899 novel by A. E. W. Mason
- The Watchers, a 1975 novel by Jane Louise Curry, the fifth installment in the Abaloc series
- The Watchers, a 1987-90 trilogy of novels by Stuart Gordon
- The Watchers, a 1991 novel by Tahar Djaout
- The Watchers: A Mystery at Alton Towers, a 1993 novel by Helen Cresswell
- The Watchers, a 2002-03 series of novels by Caiseal Mór
- The Watchers: The Rise of America's Surveillance State, a 2010 book by Shane Harris
- The Watchers, a 2011 novel by Jon Steele
- The Watchers, a 2015 novel by Neil Spring

=== Subjects ===
- Watcher (angel) or Grigori, a class of fallen angels in Biblical apocrypha
- Watcher (comics), an extraterrestrial species who watches the universe in Marvel Comics
  - Uatu, the Watcher

== In television ==
- Watcher (TV series), a South Korean TV series
- The Watcher (1995 TV series), a UPN TV series starring Sir Mix-a-Lot
- The Watcher (2022 TV series), a Netflix original limited series

=== TV elements ===
- Watcher (Doctor Who), a character in the 1981 Doctor Who serial Logopolis
- Watcher (Buffy the Vampire Slayer), a member of the Watcher's Council in the Buffy and Angel television series
- Watcher (Highlander), a secret organization that watches the Immortals in the Highlander series
- "The Watcher", first episode of the 1965 Doctor Who serial The Time Meddler

== In film ==
- Watcher (film), Emirati-American-Romanian psychological thriller film directed by Chloe Okuno
- Watchers (film), directed by Jon Hess based on the novel by Koontz
- The Watcher (2000 film), a film directed by Joe Charbanic
- The Watcher (2016 film), an American horror film directed by Ryan Rothmaier
- The Watchers (film), a 2024 horror film directed by Ishana Night Shyamalan

== In music ==
- The Watchers (album), a 2001 album by Royal Hunt
- "The Watcher" (song), a song by Dr. Dre on his 1999 album The Chronic 2001
- "Watcher", a song by Bury Tomorrow from their 2014 album Runes
- "The Watcher", a song by Enslaved from their 2008 album Vertebrae
- "The Watcher", a song by Hawkwind from their 1972 album Doremi Fasol Latido
- "The//Watcher", a song by Lorna Shore from their 2017 album Flesh Coffin
- "The Watchers", a song by War of Ages from their 2019 album Void

== Other uses ==
- Watcher (presence), a subscriber for presence information
- In the video game Dark Void, the Watchers appear as reptilians or the Annunaki
- Watcher Entertainment, a digital media studio
- The Watcher of Westfield, New Jersey, an anonymous stalker

== See also ==
- Watch (disambiguation)
- Watching (disambiguation)
