= Watching =

Watching may refer to:

== Perception ==
- Looking, the act of intentionally focusing visual perception on someone or something
- Observation, active acquisition of information
- Surveillance, monitoring of behavior, activities, or information
- Birdwatching, a hobby in which people observe birds

== Media ==
- Watching (TV series), a British television show broadcast from 1987 to 1993
- "Watching" (song), a 1983 Thompson Twins song from the album, Quick Step & Side Kick
- "Watching", a song on the 2016 Ty Dolla Sign mixtape, Campaign
- Harlan Ellison's Watching, a 1989 compilation of essays and film reviews by Harlan Ellison for Cinema magazine

== See also ==
- "Watchin'", a 1998 single by dance band Freemasons
- Watch (disambiguation)
- Watcher (disambiguation)
