= Carpenter, Kentucky =

Unincorporated community in Kentucky, United States

Coordinates: 36°42′57″N 83°58′17″W

Carpenter, is an unincorporated community (Class Code U6) located in Whitley County, Kentucky at an elevation of 1,017 feet. Carpenter appears on the Frakes U.S. Geological Survey Map.

Carpenter was named for its first postmaster and doctor, Ensley A. Carpenter, who moved to Whitley County shortly after the Civil War from neighboring Claiborne County, Tennessee. Ensley A. Carpenter practiced medicine in Whitley, Bell and Knox counties from ca. 1868 into the early 1900s.

Carpenter is located southeast of Corbin on Kentucky Route 92, between Interstate 75 and State Route 25E.
