= Watch (disambiguation) =

A watch is a timepiece that is made to be worn on a person.

Watch may also refer to:

== Vocabulary ==
- Watch, an English noun referring to those who engaged in watchkeeping or watchstanding
  - Vigla (tagma), a Byzantine regiment often translated into English as the "guard watch" or "watch"
  - Watchkeeping, the system used for rotating crew duties at sea
  - Watchman (law enforcement), law enforcement officer

== Arts, entertainment, and media ==
=== Music ===
==== Albums ====
- Watch (Manfred Mann's Earth Band album), 1978
- Watch (Seatrain album), 1973

==== Songs ====
- "Watch" (Billie Eilish song), 2017
- "Watch" (Travis Scott song), 2018
- "Watch", by Maisie Peters from The Good Witch, 2023
- "Watch", by Yeat from Afterlyfe, 2023

=== Television ===
- "Watch" (Law & Order: Criminal Intent), a 2006 episode of Law & Order: Criminal Intent
- W (UK TV channel) (formerly Watch), a British TV station launched in October 2008

=== Other uses in arts, entertainment, and media ===
- Watch (film), a 2001 American documentary
- Watch (novel), also known as WWW: Watch, the 2010 second book in a trilogy by Robert J. Sawyer
- Watch, the name of the fictional pet dog in The Boxcar Children
- Leonardo Watch, a fictional character in Blood Blockade Battlefront

== Computing and technology ==
- Watch (computer programming), a view of a variable's or an expression's value during computer program debugging
- Watch (Unix), a Unix command

== Other uses ==
- Watch, Kentucky, U.S.
- Tropical cyclone warnings and watches, alerts issued to coastal areas threatened by severe storms
- Women and the Church

== See also ==
- End of Watch (novel)
- End of Watch, a 2012 American film
- End of Watch Call
- The Watch (disambiguation)
- Watching (disambiguation)
- Watcher (disambiguation)
- Watch Me (disambiguation)
- Watchlist (disambiguation)
