= Watts Creek Jellico Coal Company, Kentucky =

Unincorporated community in Kentucky, United States

Watts Creek Jellico Coal Company
- Unincorporated community
- Location within the state of Kentucky Watts Creek Jellico Coal Company (the United States)
- Coordinates: 36°47′40″N 84°7′29″W
- Country: United States
- State: Kentucky
- County: Whitley
- Elevation: 945 ft (288 m)
- Time zone: UTC-6 (Central (CST))
  - Summer (DST): UTC-5 (CST)
- GNIS feature ID: 2710257

Watts Creek Jellico Coal Company was an unincorporated community and coal town located in Whitley County, Kentucky, United States.
