= Artemus, Kentucky =

Census-designated place in Kentucky, United States

- Census-designated place
- Location within Kentucky Location within the United States
- Coordinates: 36°50′06″N 83°50′29″W
- Country: United States
- State: Kentucky
- County: Knox

Area
  - Total: 1.36 sq mi (3.51 km^{2})
  - Land: 1.35 sq mi (3.50 km^{2})
  - Water: 0.0039 sq mi (0.01 km^{2})
- Elevation: 1,079 ft (329 m)

Population (2020)
  - Total: 453
  - Density: 335.5/sq mi (129.55/km^{2})
- Time zone: UTC-5 (Eastern (EST))
  - Summer (DST): UTC-4 (EDT)
- ZIP code: 40903
- Area code: 606
- FIPS code: 21-02188
- GNIS feature ID: 2629567

Artemus is an unincorporated community and census-designated place in Knox County, Kentucky, United States. As of the 2020 census, Artemus had a population of 453.

== Geography ==
The community is in central Knox County, 4 miles (6 km) southeast of Barbourville, the county seat. It sits on the north side of the Cumberland River. Kentucky Route 225 passes through the center of town, leading northwest to Barbourville and south 13 miles (21 km) to Kentucky Route 92 in Bell County.

According to the U.S. Census Bureau, the Artemus CDP has a total area of 1.4 square miles (3.5 km^{2}), of which 0.004 square miles (0.01 km^{2}), or 0.36%, are water.

== Climate ==
The climate in this area is characterized by hot, humid summers and generally mild to cool winters. According to the Köppen Climate Classification system, Artemus has a humid subtropical climate, abbreviated "Cfa" on climate maps.

== Demographics ==
Historical population
Census	Pop.	Note	%±
2020	453		—
U.S. Decennial Census

As of the 2010 census, there were 590 people, 233 households, and 163 families residing in the CDP. There were 282 housing units, of which 49, or 17.4%, were vacant. The racial makeup of the CDP was 96.9% white, 0.8% African American, 0.2% Native American, 0.2% Asian, 1.2% some other race, and 0.7% from two or more races. 1.5% of the population were Hispanic or Latino of any race.

Of the 233 households in the CDP, 34.8% had children under the age of 18 living with them, 46.8% were headed by married couples living together, 16.7% had a female householder with no husband present, and 30.0% were non-families. 28.3% of all households were made up of individuals, and 12.4% were someone living alone who was 65 years of age or older. The average household size was 2.53, and the average family size was 3.10.

24.4% of residents in the CDP were under the age of 18, 10.9% were from age 18 to 24, 23.6% were from 25 to 44, 24.6% were from 45 to 64, and 16.4% were 65 years of age or older. The median age was 38.8 years. For every 100 females, there were 96.0 males. For every 100 females age 18 and over, there were 90.6 males.

For the period 2013–17, the estimated median annual income for a household was $55,057, and the median income for a family was $55,922. The per capita income for the CDP was $20,829.
