= Mountain ash =

Mountain ash may refer to:

- Eucalyptus regnans, the tallest of all flowering plants, native to Australia
- Mountain-ashes or rowans, varieties of trees and shrubs in the genus Sorbus
- Fraxinus ornus, a true ash (genus Fraxinus) also, but less commonly, known as mountain ash

== See also ==
- Mountain Ash (disambiguation)
