= Salt Gum, Kentucky =

Unincorporated community in Kentucky, United States

- Unincorporated community
- Location within Kentucky Location within the United States
- Coordinates: 36°56′52″N 83°42′14″W
- Country: United States
- State: Kentucky
- County: Knox
- Elevation: 1,063 ft (324 m)
- Time zone: UTC-5 (Eastern (EST))
  - Summer (DST): UTC-4 (EDT)
- ZIP codes: 40980
- GNIS feature ID: 515187

Salt Gum is an unincorporated community within Knox County, Kentucky, United States.
