= Mills, Kentucky =

Unincorporated community in Kentucky, United States

- Unincorporated community
- Location within Kentucky Location within the United States
- Coordinates: 36°55′22″N 83°38′34″W
- Country: United States
- State: Kentucky
- County: Knox
- Elevation: 1,109 ft (338 m)
- Time zone: UTC-5 (Eastern (EST))
  - Summer (DST): UTC-4 (CDT)
- ZIP codes: 40970
- GNIS feature ID: 514013

Mills is an unincorporated community located in Knox County, Kentucky, United States.

A post office was established in 1891 by Isaac Mills and named for his family. The post office is now closed.
