= Mountain Ash, Kentucky =

Unincorporated community in Kentucky, United States

Mountain Ash
- Unincorporated community
- Location within the state of Kentucky Mountain Ash (the United States)
- Coordinates: 36°39′27″N 84°7′44″W
- Country: United States
- State: Kentucky
- County: Whitley
- Elevation: 997 ft (304 m)
- Time zone: UTC-6 (Central (CST))
  - Summer (DST): UTC-5 (CST)
- GNIS feature ID: 514123

Mountain Ash is an unincorporated community and former coal town located in Whitley County, Kentucky, United States. It is located along U.S. Route 25W and Clear Fork. Today it is home to Mountain Ash Baptist Church, which was founded by 1907. A few dozen homes make up the main part of the community along Old Mountain Ash Pike and Buck Creek Road.

From 1903 to 1932 the Jellico Coal Company operated in Mountain Ash, employing approximately 250 people. Other nearby coal towns were Pleasant View, Saxton, Kensee, and Red Ash.

Coal was first discovered in the area around 1878 and was part of the larger Jellico coal bed that stretched across Whitley County and over the Tennessee border. The coal mined from this region was considered to be of "high quality" and more than two million tons were produced at the mines' peak in 1940 in nearly Campbell County, Tennessee. Whitley County was the second leading county in Kentucky for coal production from 1890 to 1896 and 1899 to 1902. 471,538 net tons of coal were mined in 1923 in Whitley County, with 1,369 workers in the industry (1,149 of those worked underground).

Miners in Mountain Ash were issued company scrip tokens bearing the town's name and their value. These tokens were used at commissaries and company-run shops as money for essentials. Many of these tokens survive today and can be purchased via online platforms such as eBay for less than twenty U.S. dollars.

Mining in the area around Mountain Ash dropped off considerably after the Second World War, leading to a gradual decrease in population as residents moved elsewhere for work in the 1950s and 1960s. Both Whitley County and Campbell County lost nearly 20% of their population from 1950 to 1960. The population has since recovered with nearby towns such as Jellico and Williamsburg reporting population growth in recent decades.
