= Lot, Kentucky =

Unincorporated community in Kentucky, United States

Lot
- Unincorporated community
- Location within the state of Kentucky Lot (the United States)
- Coordinates: 36°36′3″N 84°5′16″W
- Country: United States
- State: Kentucky
- County: Whitley
- Elevation: 1,004 ft (306 m)
- Time zone: UTC-5 (Eastern (EST))
  - Summer (DST): UTC-4 (EST)
- GNIS feature ID: 513645

Lot is an unincorporated community located in Whitley County, Kentucky, United States. Originally known as Boston, it was named after its founder, James "Boss" Faulkner.
