= Elbert Hampton =

American politician

Member of the Kentucky House of Representatives from the 86th district
- In office June 1993 – January 1, 1997
- Preceded by: Tom Smith
- Succeeded by: Jim Stewart

Personal details
- Party: Republican

Elbert Reed Hampton (born 1943) is an American politician from Kentucky who was a member of the Kentucky House of Representatives from 1993 to 1997. Hampton was first elected in a June 1993 special election following the resignation of representative Tom Smith. He was defeated for renomination in 1996 by Jim Stewart.
