= Bryants Store, Kentucky =

Unincorporated community in Kentucky, United States

- Unincorporated community
- Location within Kentucky Location within the United States
- Coordinates: 36°46′28″N 83°55′18″W
- Country: United States
- State: Kentucky
- County: Knox
- Elevation: 971 ft (296 m)
- Time zone: UTC-5 (Eastern (EST))
  - Summer (DST): UTC-4 (EST)
- ZIP codes: 40921
- GNIS feature ID: 488177

Bryants Store is an unincorporated community in Knox County, Kentucky, United States. The post office is active.
