= Sublimation (disambiguation) =

Sublimation is a phase transition in which matter transitions from the solid to the gas phase.

Sublimation or sublimate may also refer to:

- Sublimation (album), by Canvas Solaris, 2004
- Sublimation (psychology), a mature type of defense mechanism
- Sublimate of mercury, or Mercury(II) chloride
- Volcanic sublimate, a product of deposition from vapors around volcanic vents
- Dye-sublimation printing

== See also ==
- Sublime (disambiguation)
- Sublimity (disambiguation)
- Dye-sublimation printer, a type of computer printer
