= Walker, Kentucky =

Unincorporated community in Kentucky, United States

- Unincorporated community
- Location within Kentucky Location within the United States
- Coordinates: 36°52′59″N 83°42′54″W
- Country: United States
- State: Kentucky
- County: Knox
- Elevation: 1,004 ft (306 m)
- Time zone: UTC-5 (Eastern (EST))
  - Summer (DST): UTC-4 (CDT)
- ZIP codes: 40997
- GNIS feature ID: 516204

Walker is an unincorporated community located in Knox County, Kentucky, United States.
