= Powers Coal Camp, Kentucky =

Unincorporated community in Kentucky, United States

- Unincorporated community
- Location within Kentucky Location within the United States
- Coordinates: 36°47′46″N 83°48′00″W
- Country: United States
- State: Kentucky
- County: Knox
- Elevation: 1,627 ft (496 m)
- Time zone: UTC-5 (Eastern (EST))
  - Summer (DST): UTC-4 (EDT)
- GNIS feature ID: 2554678

Powers Coal Camp is an unincorporated community and coal town in Knox County, Kentucky, United States.
