= Flat Lick, Kentucky =

Unincorporated community in Kentucky, United States

- Census-designated place
- Location within Kentucky Location within the United States
- Coordinates: 36°50′07″N 83°45′35″W
- Country: United States
- State: Kentucky
- County: Knox

Area
  - Total: 4.78 sq mi (12.39 km^{2})
  - Land: 4.78 sq mi (12.38 km^{2})
  - Water: 0.0039 sq mi (0.01 km^{2})
- Elevation: 1,188 ft (362 m)

Population (2020)
  - Total: 850
  - Density: 177.8/sq mi (68.65/km^{2})
- Time zone: UTC-5 (Eastern (EST))
  - Summer (DST): UTC-4 (EDT)
- ZIP code: 40935
- Area code: 606
- FIPS code: 21-27730
- GNIS feature ID: 2629617

Flat Lick is an unincorporated community and census-designated place (CDP) in Knox County, Kentucky, United States. As of the 2020 census, Flat Lick had a population of 850.

The oldest community in the county, Flat Lick was settled by Europeans before 1784 and named for a salty rock which attracted wild animals.

== Geography ==
Flat Lick is in eastern Knox County, northeast of the Cumberland River. U.S. Route 25E forms the western edge of the CDP; the highway leads northwest 9 miles (14 km) to Barbourville, the county seat, and southeast 7 miles (11 km) to Pineville.

According to the U.S. Census Bureau, the Flat Lick CDP has an area of 4.8 square miles (12.4 km^{2}), of which 1.7 acres (6,760 m^{2}), or 0.05%, are water.

== Demographics ==
Historical population
Census	Pop.	Note	%±
2020	850		—
U.S. Decennial Census
