= Jim Stewart (politician) =

American politician (born 1958)

Member of the Kentucky House of Representatives from the 86th district
- In office January 1, 1997 – January 1, 2021
- Preceded by: Elbert Hampton
- Succeeded by: Tom Smith

Personal details
- Born: October 21, 1958 (age 67)
- Party: Republican

Jim Stewart III (born October 21, 1958) is an American politician and a former Republican member of the Kentucky House of Representatives who represented district 86 from 1997 to 2021. He did not seek reelection in 2020.

== Elections ==
- 2012 Stewart was unopposed for both the May 22, 2012 Republican Primary and the November 6, 2012 General election, winning with 12,079 votes.
- 1994 Stewart ran in the District 86 three-way 1994 Republican Primary but lost to Elbert Hampton, who was unopposed for the November 8, 1994 General election.
- 1996 Stewart challenged Representative Hampton in the 1996 Republican Primary and won, and won the November 5, 1996 General election against Democratic nominee Denver Jackson.
- 1998 Stewart was unopposed for the 1998 Republican Primary and won the November 3, 1998 General election against Democratic nominee Patrick Hauser.
- 2000 Stewart was unopposed for the 2000 Republican Primary and won the November 7, 2000 General election with 8,454 votes (68.3%) against Democratic nominee David Moore.
- 2002 Stewart was unopposed for the 2002 Republican Primary and won the November 5, 2002 General election with 7,450 votes (60.3%) against Democratic nominee Bill Oxendine.
- 2004 Stewart was unopposed for both the 2004 Republican Primary and the November 2, 2004 General election, winning with 12,164 votes.
- 2006 Stewart was unopposed for the 2006 Republican Primary and won the November 7, 2006 General election with 9,555 votes (72.4%) against Democratic nominee Patty Hatfield.
- 2008 Stewart was unopposed for both the 2008 Republican Primary and the November 4, 2008 General election, winning with 12,006 votes.
- 2010 Stewart was unopposed for both the May 18, 2010 Republican Primary and the November 2, 2010 General election, winning with 10,161 votes.
