= The Watch =

The Watch may refer to:

- The town watch, a medieval precursor to the modern police
- The Watch (film), a science fiction comedy film starring Ben Stiller
- "The Watch" (Seinfeld), an episode of Seinfeld
- "The Watch" (The Amazing World of Gumball), an episode of The Amazing World of Gumball
- The Watch (band), an Italian progressive rock band
- The Watch (TV series), 2021 series, inspired by Terry Pratchett's Discworld novels
- The Watches, a collective name for the television programmes Springwatch, Autumnwatch and Winterwatch

== See also ==
- Watch (disambiguation)
