= Dixie, Whitley County, Kentucky =

Unincorporated community in Kentucky, United States

Dixie, Kentucky
- Unincorporated community
- Location within Kentucky
- Coordinates: 36°41′40″N 84°03′12″W
- Country: United States
- State: Kentucky
- County: Whitley
- Elevation: 981 ft (299 m)
- Time zone: UTC-5 (Eastern (EST))
  - Summer (DST): UTC-4 (EDT)
- Area code: 606
- GNIS feature ID: 486078

Dixie (also Polly Town) is an unincorporated community in Whitley County, Kentucky, United States.
