= Sublime Magazine =

British sustainable lifestyle magazine

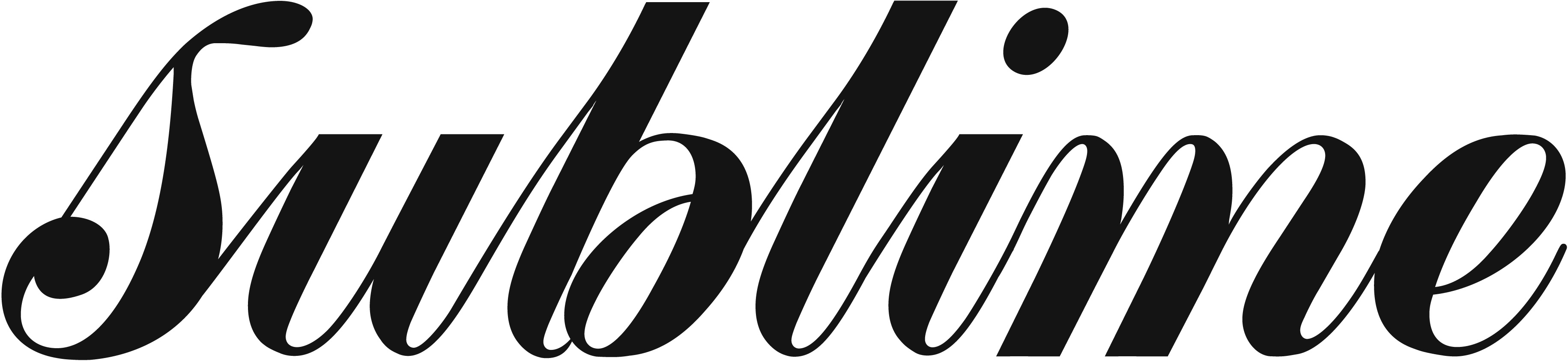
- Editor: Damian and Laura Santamaria
- Categories: Lifestyle
- Frequency: Bi-monthly (every 2 months)
- Publisher: Sublime Magazine Ltd.
- Founded: 2004
- First issue: 2006
- Based in: Highgate, London
- Website: http://www.sublimemagazine.com/

Sublime is an international sustainable lifestyle magazine. It's an independent bi-monthly print publication dedicated to making sustainability appealing.

The magazine is based and published in Highgate, North London, and it is distributed in print to more than 30 countries worldwide.

The magazine is owned solely by its founders and sustained by selective advertising and sales of the printed and digital copies.

== History ==
Sublime was founded in 2004 by husband and wife Damian and Laura Santamaria. In March 2004, they gathered a group of 30 media industry experts to test their concept. Out of these discussions, the core contributors team was formed. The concept was then promoted through events, think tank meetings and the launch of a website. By 2005, Sublime had assembled a group of 300 opinion-makers from around the world who were willing to be involved in spreading the Sublime philosophy.

Issue 0 (taster issue) was launched in September 2006, with 200,000 copies inserted into The Times and the Waitrose magazine. Issue 1 was published in January 2007 with the theme `reversing the order` featuring model Alek Wek on the front cover.

== Topics ==
Sublime covers topics such as nature, energy, fashion, technology, design and architecture, culture, food and well-being. There is a strong emphasis on community, fair trade, natural and organic products, clean technologies and sustainability. Regular contributors include Wayne Hemingway MBE, Jeremy Leggett, Dr Frances Corner, John Grant and Hanspeter Kuenzler. Music reviews, book reviews and editorials also feature alongside other articles.

Every issue of Sublime magazine has a topic or theme related to the articles and other features inside. Regeneration, Eclectic and Thinkers have been themes of past issues.

== Philosophy behind the magazine ==
Sublime aims to promote concepts of originality, ethical values, sustainability and diversity through its content.

The editors of the magazine said in their editorial in issue 26 that "sex, money and celebrity are the three pedestals on which mainstream magazines currently stand. When we started Sublime five years ago, we set out to challenge this convention by basing our publication on the somewhat more opposing principles of integrity, respect and interdependence."

Sublime's purpose is not to produce yet another green or eco magazine, but to promote a post-consumerist lifestyle that satisfies the interests of a 'transition generation'.

The magazine publishes its motto on its Facebook page:

Now that the future happened yesterday
Now that we are not what we can buy
Now that we don't want to get anywhere any faster
Now that we want to make poverty history
Now that people are the most important thing for people
Now that we know that the greatest risk is not to risk
Now that we don't need to be asleep to dream
Now it's time to start again.

== Developments ==
The magazine is trying to develop further than print. One such development is with the Sublime Econic Award, which was launched during March 2010, in Issue 20. In the issue, it explains that "Sublime will reveal the pioneering brands that have a long-standing tradition of empathy towards the environment, those that have made groundbreaking innovations in the eco market." Weleda won the first-ever Econic award, with a model wearing a dress made from their Pomegranate Bodycare Packaging. The creative team of Sublime is responsible for the design, production and photographic shoot of a tailor-made outfit using 'eco' products.

Another branch of the company is the "sublimemagazine.es" website which is a Spanish translation of the English online website. Globally, approximately 450 million people speak Spanish with correspondents in Madrid, Barcelona, Mexico, São Paulo, Buenos Aires, Rio de Janeiro, Bogota and more; the website wants to reach these Spanish-speaking countries.

The "teens.sublimemagazine.com" website wants to reach out to a younger audience with a blog for teenagers. The website is run by a teenage editor and contributors and features articles and topics that it thinks teenagers would be interested in, such as music, fashion beauty and grooming.

== Feedback ==
The Guardian published an article on Sublime and Lunch magazines in 2006. The article says that "Sublime hopes that companies will put their money where their socially responsible mouths are."

TreeHugger, a sustainability website, wrote about the magazine in 2005: "In the notoriously competitive world of magazine publishing where several new publications go under each year, the Sublime team have been meticulous in their market research".

== Editors ==
Damian and Laura Santamaria are the editorial directors of the magazine. Blueprint magazine published an article about the editors in 2001. The journalist writes: "Here's an international, cross-disciplinary network that truly speaks the same language. Its members cover visual communication, product design, fashion and architecture." The says Laura and Damian set up their business in a less-than-traditional way - in a "bullish approach" that "seems to have paid off" and is "refreshing" in the UK industry.

== Contributors ==
There are currently 19 regular contributors to the magazine, in addition to other guest contributors and contributors who no longer work with the magazine.

- Wayne Hemingway MBE, co-founder of fashion label Red or Dead and Hemingway Design. London Leader 2010.
- Jeremy Leggett, CEO of Solar Century and Solaroid. US Climate Institute's Award for Advancing Understanding. Jeremy has recently been appointed a CNN Principal Voice.
