= Green Road, Kentucky =

Unincorporated community in Kentucky, United States

- Unincorporated community
- Location within Kentucky Location within the United States
- Coordinates: 36°57′41″N 83°50′6″W
- Country: United States
- State: Kentucky
- County: Knox
- Elevation: 915 ft (279 m)
- Time zone: UTC-5 (Eastern (EST))
  - Summer (DST): UTC-4 (EDT)
- ZIP codes: 40946
- GNIS feature ID: 493300

Green Road is an unincorporated community within Knox County, Kentucky, United States.
