= Emlyn, Kentucky =

Unincorporated community in Kentucky, United States

- Unincorporated community
- Location within Kentucky Location within the United States
- Coordinates: 36°42′16″N 84°08′36″W
- Country: United States
- State: Kentucky
- County: Whitley

Area
  - Total: 0.74 sq mi (1.92 km^{2})
  - Land: 0.71 sq mi (1.85 km^{2})
  - Water: 0.027 sq mi (0.07 km^{2})
- Elevation: 971 ft (296 m)

Population (2020)
  - Total: 417
  - Density: 584.5/sq mi (225.69/km^{2})
- Time zone: UTC-5 (Eastern (EST))
  - Summer (DST): UTC-4 (EDT)
- ZIP code: 40730
- Area code: 606
- GNIS feature ID: 512067

Emlyn is an unincorporated community and census-designated place in Whitley County, Kentucky, United States. As of the 2020 census, Emlyn had a population of 417. Emlyn has a post office with ZIP code 40730, which opened on May 29, 1902. U.S. Route 25W passes through the community.

== Geography ==
According to the U.S. Census Bureau, the community has an area of 0.740 square miles (1.92 km^{2}); 0.713 square miles (1.85 km^{2}) of its area is land, and 0.027 square miles (0.070 km^{2}) is water.

== Demographics ==
Historical population
Census	Pop.	Note	%±
2010	427		—
2020	417		−2.3%
U.S. Decennial Census
