= Wofford, Kentucky =

Unincorporated community in Kentucky, United States

Wofford
- Unincorporated community
- Location within the state of Kentucky Wofford (the United States)
- Coordinates: 36°46′57″N 84°8′7″W
- Country: United States
- State: Kentucky
- County: Whitley
- Elevation: 955 ft (291 m)
- Time zone: UTC-6 (Central (CST))
  - Summer (DST): UTC-5 (CST)
- ZIP codes: 40769
- GNIS feature ID: 516427

Wofford is an unincorporated community and coal town in Whitley County, Kentucky, United States. It is located approximately three miles north-northeast of Williamsburg on Route 26.

== History ==
Wofford was initially named Mahan for a local family in residence. When a rural branch of the Williamsburg Post Office was established on April 27, 1900, the community was renamed Wofford. The post office was later closed and reincorporated into the Williamsburg Post Office.
