= Green Lanes =

Green Lanes may refer to:

- A green lane (road), a type of road, usually an unpaved rural route.
- Green Lanes (London), a major road running through north London
- Harringay, a neighbourhood in the London Borough of Haringey, sometimes informally referred to as 'Green Lanes' or 'Harringay Green Lanes' because of the railway station
- Green Lanes (album), a 2015 album by Ultimate Painting

== See also ==
- Green Lane (disambiguation)
