= Trosper, Kentucky =

Unincorporated community in Kentucky, United States

- Unincorporated community
- Location within Kentucky Location within the United States
- Coordinates: 36°47′18″N 83°49′9″W
- Country: United States
- State: Kentucky
- County: Knox
- Elevation: 1,014 ft (309 m)
- Time zone: UTC-5 (Eastern (EST))
  - Summer (DST): UTC-4 (Eastern (EDT))
- ZIP code: 40995
- Area code: 606
- GNIS feature ID: 509237

Trosper is an unincorporated community and coal town in Knox County, Kentucky, United States.
