= Cruise, Kentucky =

Unincorporated community in Kentucky, United States

- Unincorporated community
- Location in Kentucky Location in the United States
- Coordinates: 37°19′6″N 84°7′23″W
- Country: United States
- State: Kentucky
- County: Laurel
- Elevation: 1,240 ft (380 m)
- Time zone: UTC-5 (Eastern (EST))
  - Summer (DST): UTC-4 (EST)
- GNIS feature ID: 511664

Cruise is an unincorporated community in Laurel County, Kentucky, United States.

The community was named for an early settler and entrepreneur of the same name. A post office was established in 1899 with Welcom Mullins as its first postmaster.
