= Julip, Kentucky =

Unincorporated community in Kentucky, United States

Julip
- Unincorporated community
- Location within the state of Kentucky Julip (the United States)
- Coordinates: 36°44′34″N 84°3′57″W
- Country: United States
- State: Kentucky
- County: Whitley
- Elevation: 981 ft (299 m)
- Time zone: UTC-6 (Central (CST))
  - Summer (DST): UTC-5 (CST)
- GNIS feature ID: 513091

Julip is an unincorporated community located in Whitley County, Kentucky, United States.
