= Watch, Kentucky =

Unincorporated community in Kentucky, United States

- Unincorporated community
- Location within Kentucky Location within the United States
- Coordinates: 36°57′18″N 84°2′46″W
- Country: United States
- State: Kentucky
- County: Knox
- Elevation: 1,161 ft (354 m)
- Time zone: UTC-5 (Eastern (EST))
  - Summer (DST): UTC-4 (EDT)
- GNIS feature ID: 516240

Watch is an unincorporated community in Knox County, Kentucky, United States. Its post office has been closed.

The origin of the name "Watch" is obscure.
