= Heidrick, Kentucky =

Unincorporated community in Kentucky, United States

- Unincorporated community
- Location within Kentucky Location within the United States
- Coordinates: 36°52′57″N 83°52′43″W
- Country: United States
- State: Kentucky
- County: Knox
- Elevation: 1,001 ft (305 m)
- Time zone: UTC-5 (Eastern (EST))
  - Summer (DST): UTC-4 (CDT)
- ZIP codes: 40949
- GNIS feature ID: 494001

Heidrick is an unincorporated community located in Knox County, Kentucky, United States.
