= Crane Nest, Kentucky =

Unincorporated community in Kentucky, United States

- Unincorporated community
- Location within Kentucky Location within the United States
- Coordinates: 36°59′23″N 83°52′46″W
- Country: United States
- State: Kentucky
- County: Knox
- Elevation: 1,024 ft (312 m)
- Time zone: UTC-6 (Central (CST))
  - Summer (DST): UTC-5 (CST)
- GNIS feature ID: 507772

Crane Nest (also known as Cranes Nest) is an unincorporated community located in Knox County, Kentucky, United States.

A post office was established in 1874. According to tradition, the town gets its name from a rare crane's nest discovered in the area.
