= Nevisdale, Kentucky =

Unincorporated community in Kentucky, United States

Nevisdale
- Unincorporated community
- Location within the state of Kentucky Nevisdale (the United States)
- Coordinates: 36°41′12″N 84°2′46″W
- Country: United States
- State: Kentucky
- County: Whitley
- Elevation: 978 ft (298 m)
- Time zone: UTC-6 (Central (CST))
  - Summer (DST): UTC-5 (CST)
- GNIS feature ID: 514229

Nevisdale is an unincorporated community and coal town located in Whitley County, Kentucky, United States.

The Nevisdale Elementary School closed in 2008. Whitley County decided to consolidate Poplar Creek Elementary School and Nevisdale Elementary School into a new school, Whitley East Elementary School.
