= Laurel County, Kentucky =

County in Kentucky, United States

- County
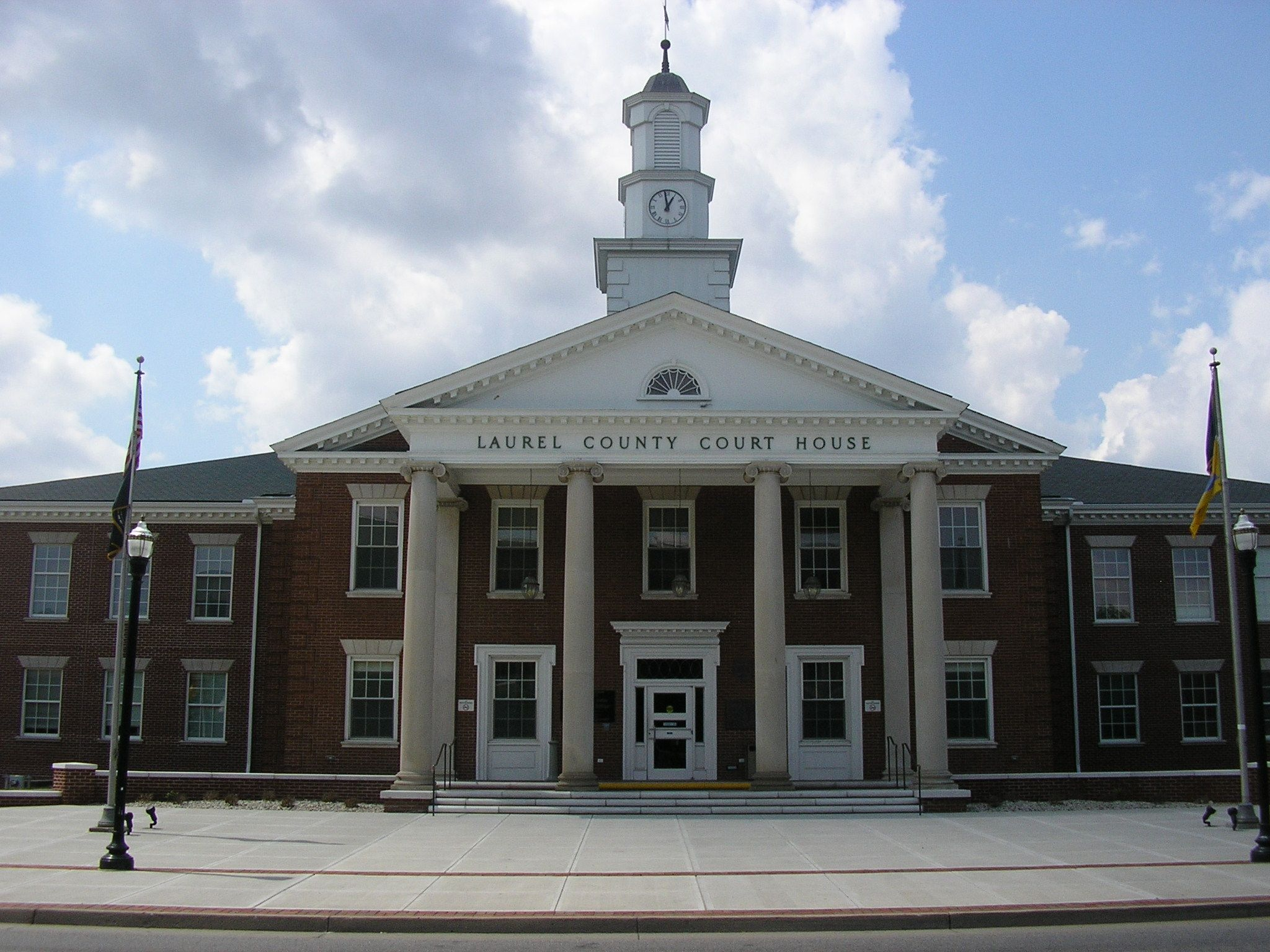
- Laurel County courthouse in London

- Location within the U.S. state of Kentucky
- Coordinates: 37°06′38″N 84°07′04″W
- Country: United States
- State: Kentucky
- Founded: December 21, 1825
- Named for: Mountain laurel trees
- Seat: London
- Largest city: London

Government
  - Judge/Executive: David Westerfield (R)

Area
  - Total: 444 sq mi (1,150 km^{2})
  - Land: 434 sq mi (1,120 km^{2})
  - Water: 9.7 sq mi (25 km^{2}) 2.2%

Population (2020)
  - Total: 62,613
  - Estimate (2025): 63,746 ▲
  - Density: 144/sq mi (55.7/km^{2})
- Time zone: UTC−5 (Eastern)
  - Summer (DST): UTC−4 (EDT)
- Congressional district: 5th
- Website: londonky.gov

Laurel County is a county located in the southeastern portion of the U.S. state of Kentucky. As of the 2020 census, the population was 62,613. Its county seat is London. After a special election in January 2016 alcohol sales are permitted only in the city limits of London. The ordinance went into effect on March 27, 2016, 60 days after results of the election. Laurel County is included in the London, KY Micropolitan Statistical Area.

== History ==
Laurel County, the 80th county to be organized in Kentucky, was established by an act of the general assembly, December 21, 1825, from parts of Rockcastle, Clay, Knox and Whitley Counties. Laurel County was named from the Laurel River, noted for dense laurel thickets along its banks.

Laurel County was the location of the Battle of Wildcat Mountain, a pivotal yet little known battle during the American Civil War that kept Confederate armies from advancing on Big Hill, a major stronghold during the war.

After a fire damaged the courthouse in 1958, a new structure was completed in 1961.

The first Kentucky Fried Chicken was started in southern Laurel County by Colonel Harland Sanders just north of Corbin. Nowadays, visitors are welcomed to the original cafe and museum where they can eat at, tour, and learn about the start of the worldwide franchise. Due to the history of chicken in the county, The World Chicken Festival is celebrated every year in London, the county seat, drawing crowds of up to 250,000 people over the four-day festival.

== Geography ==
According to the United States Census Bureau, the county has a total area of 444 square miles (1,150 km^{2}), of which 434 square miles (1,120 km^{2}) is land and 9.7 square miles (25 km^{2}) (2.2%) is water. Part of Laurel River Lake is in Laurel County.

=== Adjacent counties ===
- Jackson County (northeast)
- Clay County (east)
- Knox County (southeast)
- Whitley County (south)
- McCreary County (southwest)
- Pulaski County (west)
- Rockcastle County (northwest)

=== National protected area ===
- Daniel Boone National Forest (part)

== Demographics ==
Historical population
Census	Pop.	Note	%±
1830	2,206		—
1840	3,079		39.6%
1850	4,145		34.6%
1860	5,488		32.4%
1870	6,016		9.6%
1880	9,131		51.8%
1890	13,747		50.6%
1900	17,592		28.0%
1910	19,872		13.0%
1920	19,814		−0.3%
1930	21,109		6.5%
1940	25,640		21.5%
1950	25,797		0.6%
1960	24,901		−3.5%
1970	27,386		10.0%
1980	38,982		42.3%
1990	43,438		11.4%
2000	52,715		21.4%
2010	58,849		11.6%
2020	62,613		6.4%
2025 (est.)	63,746	▲	1.8%
U.S. Decennial Census; 1790-1960 1900-1990; 1990-2000 2010-2020

=== 2020 census ===
As of the 2020 census, the county had a population of 62,613. The median age was 40.2 years. 23.4% of residents were under the age of 18 and 16.9% of residents were 65 years of age or older. For every 100 females there were 96.9 males, and for every 100 females age 18 and over there were 94.9 males age 18 and over.

The racial makeup of the county was 94.1% White, 0.7% Black or African American, 0.3% American Indian and Alaska Native, 0.7% Asian, 0.0% Native Hawaiian and Pacific Islander, 0.7% from some other race, and 3.6% from two or more races. Hispanic or Latino residents of any race comprised 1.6% of the population.

39.0% of residents lived in urban areas, while 61.0% lived in rural areas.

There were 24,262 households in the county, of which 32.8% had children under the age of 18 living with them and 26.3% had a female householder with no spouse or partner present. About 25.8% of all households were made up of individuals and 10.7% had someone living alone who was 65 years of age or older.

There were 26,533 housing units, of which 8.6% were vacant. Among occupied housing units, 69.5% were owner-occupied and 30.5% were renter-occupied. The homeowner vacancy rate was 1.2% and the rental vacancy rate was 5.8%.

=== 2010 census ===
As of the census of 2010, Laurel County was 97.00% White or European American, 0.3% Native American and 0.7% Black or African American.

There were 20,353 households, out of which 35.20% had children under the age of 18 living with them, 60.60% were married couples living together, 11.40% had a female householder with no husband present, and 24.50% were non-families. 21.70% of all households were made up of individuals, and 8.20% had someone living alone who was 65 years of age or older. The average household size was 2.56 and the average family size was 2.97.

The age distribution was 25.40% under 18, 9.20% from 18 to 24, 30.40% from 25 to 44, 23.50% from 45 to 64, and 11.50% who were 65 or older. The median age was 36 years. For every 100 females, there were 95.60 males. For every 100 females age 18 and over, there were 92.80 males.

The median income for a household in the county was $27,015, and the median income for a family was $31,318. Males had a median income of $27,965 versus $19,757 for females. The per capita income for the county was $14,165. About 17.80% of families and 21.30% of the population were below the poverty line, including 28.80% of those under age 18 and 20.10% of those age 65 or over.

== Politics ==
United States presidential election results for Laurel County, Kentucky
Year	Republican		Democratic		Third party(ies)	
Year	No.	%	No.	%	No.	%
1912	1,085	32.66%	1,094	32.93%	1,143	34.41%
1916	2,383	65.29%	1,171	32.08%	96	2.63%
1920	4,252	71.96%	1,621	27.43%	36	0.61%
1924	3,274	66.24%	1,451	29.35%	218	4.41%
1928	4,906	81.06%	1,141	18.85%	5	0.08%
1932	4,827	57.26%	3,569	42.34%	34	0.40%
1936	4,798	64.08%	2,677	35.76%	12	0.16%
1940	5,180	64.27%	2,860	35.48%	20	0.25%
1944	5,051	70.54%	2,104	29.39%	5	0.07%
1948	4,107	64.60%	2,187	34.40%	64	1.01%
1952	5,776	71.74%	2,263	28.11%	12	0.15%
1956	6,586	73.87%	2,316	25.98%	14	0.16%
1960	7,485	76.42%	2,309	23.58%	0	0.00%
1964	5,008	57.80%	3,633	41.93%	24	0.28%
1968	6,251	67.57%	1,756	18.98%	1,244	13.45%
1972	7,276	75.63%	2,274	23.64%	70	0.73%
1976	6,186	61.41%	3,813	37.85%	74	0.73%
1980	8,868	68.23%	3,969	30.54%	160	1.23%
1984	9,621	74.41%	3,267	25.27%	41	0.32%
1988	9,296	71.54%	3,620	27.86%	78	0.60%
1992	8,583	57.03%	4,560	30.30%	1,907	12.67%
1996	9,454	62.65%	4,306	28.54%	1,330	8.81%
2000	13,029	71.90%	4,856	26.80%	235	1.30%
2004	16,819	75.54%	5,297	23.79%	148	0.66%
2008	17,660	78.49%	4,618	20.52%	222	0.99%
2012	18,151	81.00%	3,905	17.43%	352	1.57%
2016	20,592	82.92%	3,440	13.85%	801	3.23%
2020	23,237	82.66%	4,475	15.92%	399	1.42%
2024	23,516	84.17%	4,037	14.45%	385	1.38%

Like all of the eastern Pennyroyal Plateau and adjacent parts of the Western and Eastern Coalfields, Laurel County was strongly pro-Union during the Civil War. The county – in common with all adjacent areas – has been rock-ribbed Republican ever since. The only Democrats to receive forty percent of the county's vote since then have been Franklin D. Roosevelt in his 1932 landslide and Lyndon Johnson during an equally large landslide in 1964, although with the Republican Party mortally divided Woodrow Wilson did obtain a nine-vote plurality in 1912.

=== Elected officials ===
Elected officials as of January 3, 2025
U.S. House	Hal Rogers (R)	KY 5
Ky. Senate	Brandon J. Storm (R)	21
Ky. House	Josh Bray (R)	71
Ky. House	Nick Wilson (R)	82
Ky. House	Shane Baker (R)	85
Ky. House	Tom Smith (R)	86
Ky. House	Timmy Truett (R)	89
Ky. House	Derek Lewis (R)	90

== Education ==
Two public school districts serve K–12 students in the county:

- Laurel County School District – Operates one preschool, 11 elementary schools, two middle schools, and two high schools.
- East Bernstadt Independent School District – Operates a single K–8 school. High school students in the district may attend high school in either of the Laurel County district's.

== Communities ==
=== Cities ===
- Corbin (Mostly in Whitley County; part also in Knox County)
- London

=== Census-designated places ===
- East Bernstadt
- North Corbin

=== Other unincorporated communities ===
- Atlanta
- Bernstadt
- Boreing
- Bush
- Cruise
- Keavy
- Lake
- Lily
- Pittsburg
- Sublimity City
- Symbol

== Notable residents ==
- Nationally bestselling author Silas House was born and raised in Laurel County.
- Former University of Kentucky basketball star Jeff Sheppard who briefly played in the NBA
- NBA Player Reed Sheppard, son of Jeff and Stacey Sheppard played basketball for University of Kentucky basketball. He was the third overall pick in the NBA Draft 2024 by the Houston Rockets.
- 2000 ASCAP Songwriter of the Year Darrell Scott, who has written hit songs for the Dixie Chicks, Travis Tritt, Brad Paisley, Patty Loveless, and many others, was born in London.
- Chera-Lyn Cook, the first from Southeast Kentucky to win the title of Miss Kentucky. Cook was talent winner and 4th runner-up to Miss America 1999.
- Flem D. Sampson, the 42nd governor of the State of Kentucky is from Laurel County.
- Bill Taylor, professional bass fisherman who was also the director of tournament operations for MLF formerly FLW was born and raised in the Sublimity area of Laurel County. Taylor is also an inductee into the bass fishing hall of fame.

== See also ==
- National Register of Historic Places listings in Laurel County, Kentucky
