= Bush, Kentucky =

Unincorporated community in Kentucky, United States

- Unincorporated community
- Location within Kentucky Location within the United States
- Coordinates: 37°05′33″N 83°52′13″W
- Country: United States
- State: Kentucky
- County: Laurel

Area
  - Total: 0.36 sq mi (0.92 km^{2})
- Elevation: 1,220 ft (370 m)
- Time zone: UTC-5 (Eastern (EST))
  - Summer (DST): UTC-4 (EDT)
- ZIP code: 40741, 40744
- Area code: 606
- GNIS feature ID: 511092

Bush is an unincorporated community in Laurel County, Kentucky, United States. Bush is located on Kentucky Route 80 in eastern Laurel County, 12 miles (19 km) east-southeast of London. Bush had a post office, which opened on February 18, 1840, and closed on January 22, 2011; it still has its own ZIP code, 40724.
