= Green Lane =

Green Lane may refer to:

- Green lane (road), a type of route
- Green Lane (Stockport), a defunct football ground in Stockport, England
- Green Lane, George Town, Penang, Malaysia
- Green Lane, London, United Kingdom
- Some other locations in England
- Green Lane, Pennsylvania, United States
- Greenlane, Auckland, New Zealand
- Green Lane, Singapore
- Green Lane Bridge in Philadelphia

== See also ==
- Green Lane Hospital, a psychiatric hospital in Devizes, England
- Greenlane Clinical Centre, hospital in Auckland, New Zealand - formerly Green Lane Hospital, Auckland
- Green Lane Cricket Ground in Durham, England
- Green Lane railway station, Wirral, England
- Green Lane Masjid, a large mosque in Birmingham, England
- Harringay, a neighbourhood in the London borough of Haringey sometimes incorrectly referred to as Green Lanes or Harringay Green Lanes because of the railway station, named after the A105 road, Green Lanes
- Green Lanes (disambiguation)
