= Goldbug, Kentucky =

Unincorporated community in Kentucky, United States

Goldbug
- Unincorporated community
- Location within the state of Kentucky Goldbug (the United States)
- Coordinates: 36°47′33″N 84°10′5″W
- Country: United States
- State: Kentucky
- County: Whitley
- Elevation: 1,122 ft (342 m)
- Time zone: UTC-5 (Eastern (EST))
  - Summer (DST): UTC-4 (EST)
- GNIS feature ID: 512337

Goldbug is an unincorporated community located in Whitley County, Kentucky, United States.

A post office was established in the community in 1896. The name Goldbug is thought to refer to supporters of the central gold standard issue in the 1896 United States presidential election.
