= Ingram, Kentucky =

Unincorporated community in Kentucky, United States

- Unincorporated community
- Location within Kentucky
- Coordinates: 36°43′49″N 83°47′54″W
- Country: United States
- State: Kentucky
- County: Bell
- Elevation: 1,030 ft (310 m)
- Time zone: UTC-5 (Eastern (EST))
  - Summer (DST): UTC-4 (EDT)
- ZIP code: 40955
- Area code: 606
- GNIS feature ID: 508313

Ingram is an unincorporated community in Bell County, Kentucky, United States. Ingram is located 6.2 miles (10.0 km) west-southwest of Pineville along Kentucky Route 92. Ingram has a post office with ZIP code 40955, which opened on July 15, 1881.
