= Yaden, Kentucky =

Unincorporated community in Kentucky, United States

Yaden
- Unincorporated community
- Location within the state of Kentucky Yaden (the United States)
- Coordinates: 36°44′25″N 84°6′8″W
- Country: United States
- State: Kentucky
- County: Whitley
- Elevation: 945 ft (288 m)
- Time zone: UTC-6 (Central (CST))
  - Summer (DST): UTC-5 (CST)
- GNIS feature ID: 516497

Yaden is an unincorporated community located in Whitley County, Kentucky, United States.

Yaden is home to what is believed to be the 2nd oldest church in Williamsburg that being Mt.Pisgah Baptist Church established in 1888.
