= Kayjay, Kentucky =

Unincorporated community in Kentucky, United States

- Unincorporated community
- Location within Kentucky Location within the United States
- Coordinates: 36°44′39″N 83°50′57″W
- Country: United States
- State: Kentucky
- County: Knox
- Elevation: 1,073 ft (327 m)
- Time zone: UTC-5 (Eastern (EDT))
  - Summer (DST): UTC-4 (EDT)
- GNIS feature ID: 495581

Kayjay is an unincorporated community located in Knox County, Kentucky, United States. Its name comes from the initials of the Kentucky-Jellico Coal Company.
