= Symbol, Kentucky =

Unincorporated community in Kentucky, United States

- Unincorporated community
- Location in Kentucky Location in the United States
- Coordinates: 37°16′26″N 84°8′20″W
- Country: United States
- State: Kentucky
- County: Laurel
- Elevation: 1,253 ft (382 m)
- Time zone: UTC-5 (Eastern (EST))
  - Summer (DST): UTC-4 (EDT)
- ZIP codes: 40764
- GNIS feature ID: 515841

Symbol is an unincorporated community located in Laurel County, Kentucky, United States. Its post office closed in 1988.
