= Sublimity City, Kentucky =

Unincorporated community in Kentucky, United States

Sublimity City
- Unincorporated community
- Location within the state of Kentucky Sublimity City (the United States)
- Coordinates: 37°5′40″N 84°5′1″W
- Country: United States
- State: Kentucky
- County: Laurel
- Elevation: 1,214 ft (370 m)
- Time zone: UTC-5 (Eastern (EST))
  - Summer (DST): UTC-4 (EST)
- GNIS feature ID: 515771

Sublimity City is an unincorporated community located in Laurel County, Kentucky, United States. Originally known as the Sublimity Forest Community, it was developed under the authority of the Emergency Relief Appropriation Act of 1935.
