= Lake, Kentucky =

Unincorporated community in Kentucky, United States

- Unincorporated community
- Location in Kentucky Location in the United States
- Coordinates: 37°5′22″N 83°53′8″W
- Country: United States
- State: Kentucky
- County: Laurel
- Elevation: 1,207 ft (368 m)
- Time zone: UTC-5 (Eastern (EST))
  - Summer (DST): UTC-4 (EST)
- GNIS feature ID: 513187

Lake is an unincorporated community in Laurel County, Kentucky, United States.
