= Atlanta, Kentucky =

Unincorporated community in Kentucky, United States

- Unincorporated community
- Location within Kentucky Location within the United States
- Coordinates: 37°13′57″N 84°02′58″W
- Country: United States
- State: Kentucky
- County: Laurel
- Elevation: 1,010 ft (308 m)

Atlanta is an unincorporated community in Laurel County, Kentucky, United States. Its elevation is 1,010 feet (310 m), and it is located just off Route 30.
