= Saxton, Kentucky =

Unincorporated community in Kentucky, United States

Saxton
- Unincorporated community
- Location within the state of Kentucky Saxton (the United States)
- Coordinates: 36°38′1″N 84°6′36″W
- Country: United States
- State: Kentucky
- County: Whitley
- Elevation: 961 ft (293 m)
- Time zone: UTC-6 (Eastern (EST))
  - Summer (DST): UTC-5 (EST)
- Area code: 606
- GNIS feature ID: 515269

Saxton is an unincorporated community and coal town in Whitley County, Kentucky, United States.
