= Pleasant View, Kentucky =

Census-designated place in Kentucky, United States

Pleasant View
- Unincorporated community & census-designated place
- Location within the state of Kentucky Pleasant View (the United States)
- Coordinates: 36°40′40″N 84°7′43″W
- Country: United States
- State: Kentucky
- County: Whitley

Area
  - Total: 0.82 sq mi (2.13 km^{2})
  - Land: 0.79 sq mi (2.05 km^{2})
  - Water: 0.031 sq mi (0.08 km^{2})
- Elevation: 997 ft (304 m)

Population (2020)
  - Total: 326
  - Density: 412.9/sq mi (159.41/km^{2})
- Time zone: UTC-5 (Eastern (EST))
  - Summer (DST): UTC-4 (EST)
- ZIP code: 40769
- Area code: 606
- FIPS code: 21-61734
- GNIS feature ID: 514657

Pleasant View is a census-designated place, unincorporated community and coal town in Whitley County, Kentucky, United States. As of the 2020 census, Pleasant View had a population of 326. Their post office closed in 1965.

== Demographics ==
Historical population
Census	Pop.	Note	%±
2010	350		—
2020	326		−6.9%
U.S. Decennial Census
