= Woodbine, Kentucky =

Unincorporated community in Kentucky, United States

Woodbine
- Unincorporated community
- Location within the state of Kentucky Woodbine (the United States)
- Coordinates: 36°54′17″N 84°5′20″W
- Country: United States
- State: Kentucky
- County: Whitley
- Elevation: 1,115 ft (340 m)
- Time zone: UTC-5 (Eastern (EST))
  - Summer (DST): UTC-4 (EDT)
- ZIP code: 40771
- Area code: 606
- GNIS feature ID: 516470

Woodbine is an unincorporated community located in Whitley County, Kentucky, United States.
