= Barbourville, Kentucky =

- City
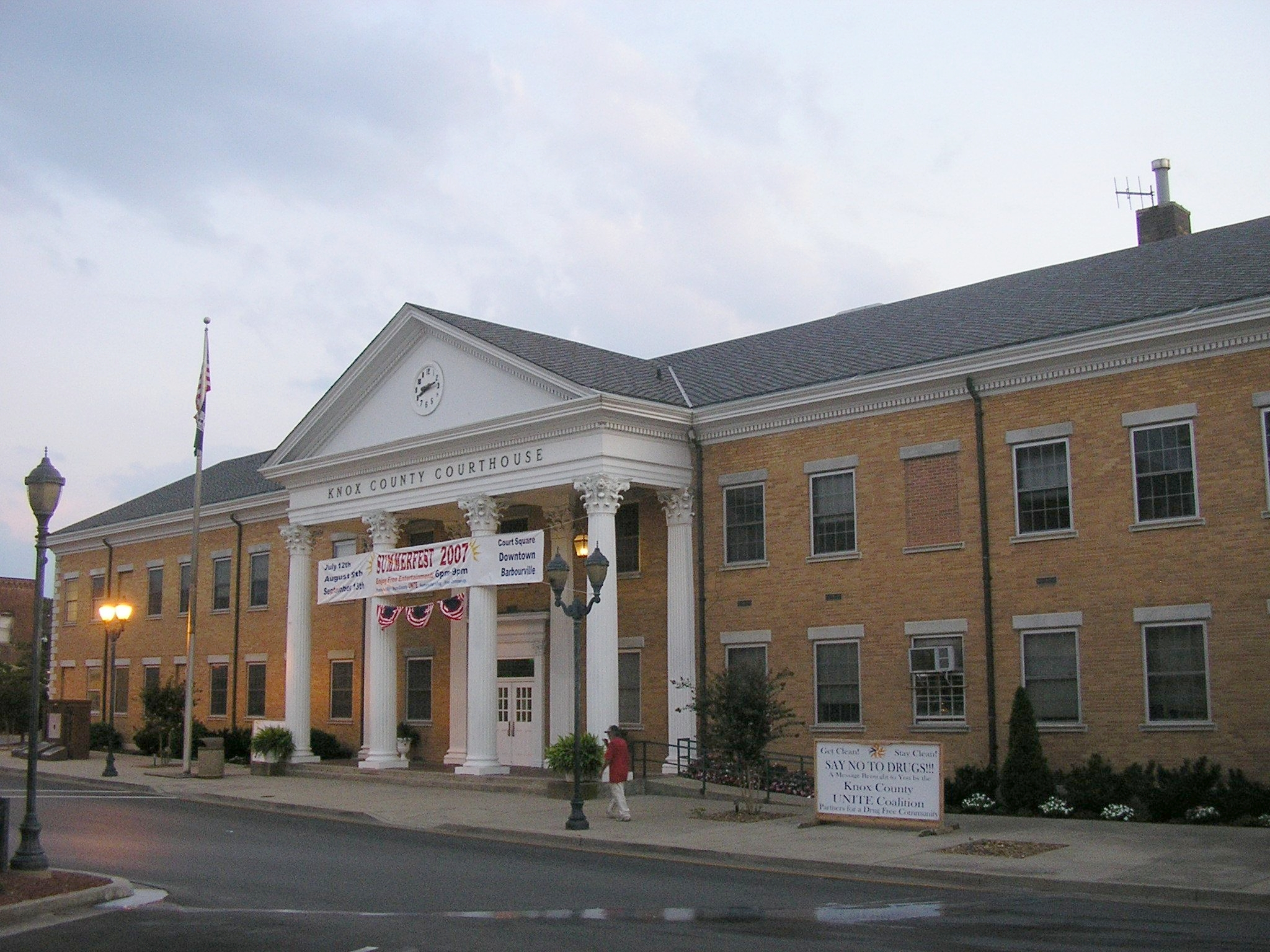
- Knox County Courthouse in Barbourville

- Location in Knox County, Kentucky
- Coordinates: 36°52′00″N 83°53′05″W
- Country: United States
- State: Kentucky
- County: Knox

Government
  - Mayor: David Thompson

Area
  - Total: 2.72 sq mi (7.04 km^{2})
  - Land: 2.66 sq mi (6.88 km^{2})
  - Water: 0.062 sq mi (0.16 km^{2})
- Elevation: 971 ft (296 m)

Population (2020)
  - Total: 3,222
  - Estimate (2024): 3,081
  - Density: 1,213.3/sq mi (468.47/km^{2})
- Time zone: UTC-5 (Eastern (EST))
  - Summer (DST): UTC-4 (EDT)
- ZIP code: 40906
- Area code: 606
- FIPS code: 21-03574
- GNIS feature ID: 2403155
- Website: www.cityofbarbourville.com

Barbourville is a home rule-class city in Knox County, Kentucky, in the United States. As of the 2020 census, Barbourville had a population of 3,222. It is the county seat of Knox County. The city was formally established by the state assembly in 1812. It was incorporated in 1854 and then reincorporated in 1856.

Union Commonwealth University and the Appalachian Children's Home are located in Barbourville.

== Geography ==
Barbourville is in the center of Knox County, in the valley of the Cumberland River where it is joined by Richland Creek. U.S. Route 25E passes through the east side of the city, leading northwest 16 miles (26 km) to Corbin and southeast the same distance to Pineville.

According to the United States Census Bureau, the city has a total area of 2.68 square miles (6.95 km^{2}), of which 2.62 square miles (6.79 km^{2}) are land and 0.06 square miles (0.16 km^{2}), or 2.35%, are water.

=== Climate ===
Climate data for Barbourville, Kentucky (1991–2020 normals, extremes 1950–present)
Month	Jan	Feb	Mar	Apr	May	Jun	Jul	Aug	Sep	Oct	Nov	Dec	Year
Record high °F (°C)	80 (27)	80 (27)	87 (31)	92 (33)	96 (36)	106 (41)	105 (41)	102 (39)	106 (41)	96 (36)	83 (28)	79 (26)	106 (41)
Mean maximum °F (°C)	66.2 (19.0)	70.3 (21.3)	78.0 (25.6)	84.9 (29.4)	88.6 (31.4)	92.6 (33.7)	94.3 (34.6)	93.1 (33.9)	91.4 (33.0)	84.7 (29.3)	75.3 (24.1)	67.4 (19.7)	95.3 (35.2)
Mean daily maximum °F (°C)	45.1 (7.3)	50.1 (10.1)	58.8 (14.9)	69.3 (20.7)	77.4 (25.2)	84.3 (29.1)	87.0 (30.6)	86.2 (30.1)	81.1 (27.3)	70.6 (21.4)	58.3 (14.6)	48.9 (9.4)	68.1 (20.1)
Daily mean °F (°C)	34.9 (1.6)	38.9 (3.8)	45.8 (7.7)	55.3 (12.9)	64.4 (18.0)	72.3 (22.4)	75.9 (24.4)	74.9 (23.8)	68.7 (20.4)	57.1 (13.9)	45.5 (7.5)	38.4 (3.6)	56.0 (13.3)
Mean daily minimum °F (°C)	24.6 (−4.1)	27.6 (−2.4)	32.8 (0.4)	41.3 (5.2)	51.4 (10.8)	60.3 (15.7)	64.8 (18.2)	63.6 (17.6)	56.3 (13.5)	43.5 (6.4)	32.8 (0.4)	27.9 (−2.3)	43.9 (6.6)
Mean minimum °F (°C)	4.7 (−15.2)	10.9 (−11.7)	16.7 (−8.5)	27.0 (−2.8)	36.7 (2.6)	47.9 (8.8)	54.0 (12.2)	52.5 (11.4)	42.5 (5.8)	28.7 (−1.8)	18.6 (−7.4)	11.8 (−11.2)	1.7 (−16.8)
Record low °F (°C)	−22 (−30)	−20 (−29)	−5 (−21)	17 (−8)	28 (−2)	34 (1)	40 (4)	40 (4)	33 (1)	12 (−11)	2 (−17)	−12 (−24)	−22 (−30)
Average precipitation inches (mm)	4.37 (111)	4.35 (110)	4.91 (125)	5.08 (129)	4.54 (115)	5.11 (130)	5.77 (147)	3.98 (101)	3.45 (88)	3.13 (80)	3.82 (97)	5.26 (134)	53.77 (1,366)
Average precipitation days (≥ 0.01 in)	13.1	13.4	13.3	12.7	12.9	12.3	12.8	9.4	9.1	9.6	10.7	13.9	143.2
Source: NOAA

== Demographics ==
Historical population
Census	Pop.	Note	%±
1810	55		—
1830	138		—
1840	224		62.3%
1850	184		−17.9%
1860	230		25.0%
1870	438		90.4%
1880	250		−42.9%
1890	1,162		364.8%
1900	1,010		−13.1%
1910	1,633		61.7%
1920	1,877		14.9%
1930	2,380		26.8%
1940	2,420		1.7%
1950	2,926		20.9%
1960	3,211		9.7%
1970	3,549		10.5%
1980	3,333		−6.1%
1990	3,658		9.8%
2000	3,589		−1.9%
2010	3,165		−11.8%
2020	3,222		1.8%
2024 (est.)	3,081		−4.4%
U.S. Decennial Census

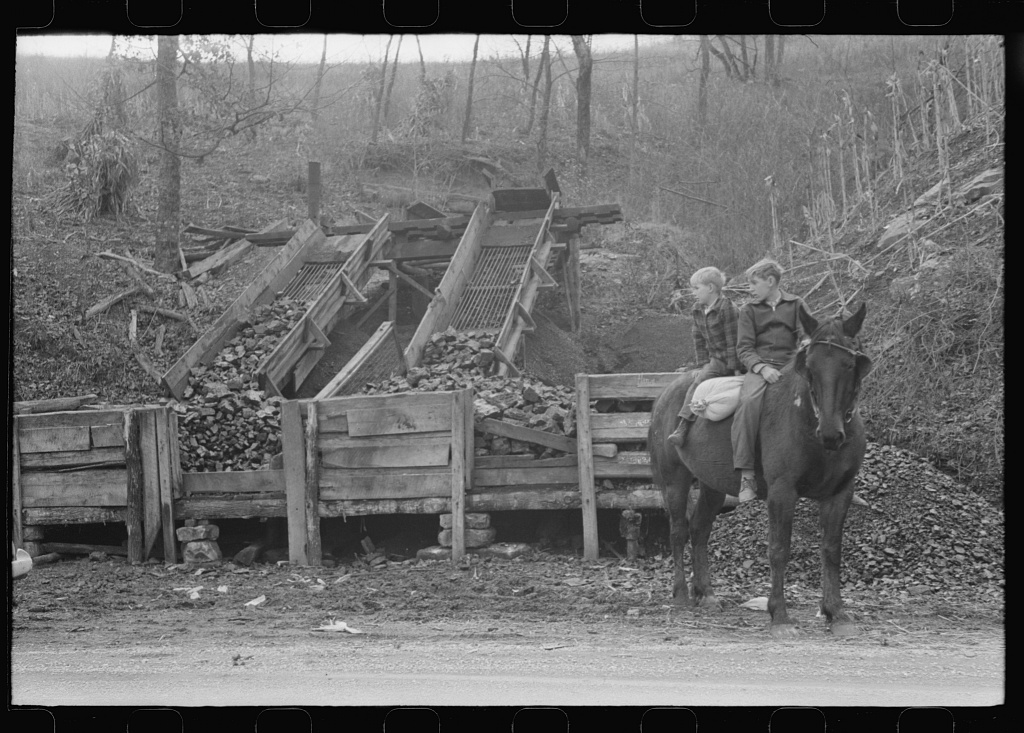
Abner Mine near Barbourville, 1940. Photo by Marion Post Wolcott.

=== 2020 census ===
As of the 2020 census, Barbourville had a population of 3,222. The median age was 39.5 years. 17.5% of residents were under the age of 18 and 18.2% were 65 years of age or older. For every 100 females there were 94.4 males, and for every 100 females age 18 and over there were 91.9 males age 18 and over.

99.4% of residents lived in urban areas, while 0.6% lived in rural areas.

There were 1,227 households in Barbourville, of which 26.4% had children under the age of 18 living in them. Of all households, 30.5% were married-couple households, 22.7% were households with a male householder and no spouse or partner present, and 41.0% were households with a female householder and no spouse or partner present. About 41.1% of all households were made up of individuals and 17.2% had someone living alone who was 65 years of age or older.

There were 1,395 housing units, of which 12.0% were vacant. The homeowner vacancy rate was 2.4% and the rental vacancy rate was 9.0%.

Racial composition as of the 2020 census
Race	Number	Percent
White	2,951	91.6%
Black or African American	114	3.5%
American Indian and Alaska Native	11	0.3%
Asian	12	0.4%
Native Hawaiian and Other Pacific Islander	1	0.0%
Some other race	27	0.8%
Two or more races	106	3.3%
Hispanic or Latino (of any race)	50	1.6%

=== 2000 census ===
As of the census of 2000, there were 3,165 people, 1,211 households, and 662 families residing in the city. The population density was 1,027.4 inhabitants per square mile (396.7/km^{2}). There were 1,646 housing units at an average density of 471.2 per square mile (181.9/km^{2}). The racial makeup of the city was 94.40% White, 3.23% African American, 0.56% Native American, 0.25% Asian, 0.17% from other races, and 1.39% from two or more races. Hispanic or Latino of any race were 0.59% of the population.

There were 1,211 households, out of which 24.9% had children under the age of 18 living with them, 36.9% were married couples living together, 19.6% had a female householder with no husband present, and 40.9% were non-families. 37.8% of all households were made up of individuals, and 15.4% had someone living alone who was 65 years of age or older. The average household size was 2.18 and the average family size was 2.88.

In the city, the population was spread out, with 22.1% under the age of 18, 15.7% from 18 to 24, 24.7% from 25 to 44, 20.5% from 45 to 64, and 17.0% who were 65 years of age or older. The median age was 34 years. For every 100 females, there were 82.2 males. For every 100 females age 18 and over, there were 78.4 males.

The median income for a household in the city was $13,297, and the median income for a family was $20,762. Males had a median income of $31,775 versus $18,102 for females. The per capita income for the city was $11,485. About 32.6% of families and 38.0% of the population were below the poverty line, including 43.4% of those under age 18 and 30.5% of those age 65 or over.

== Arts and culture ==
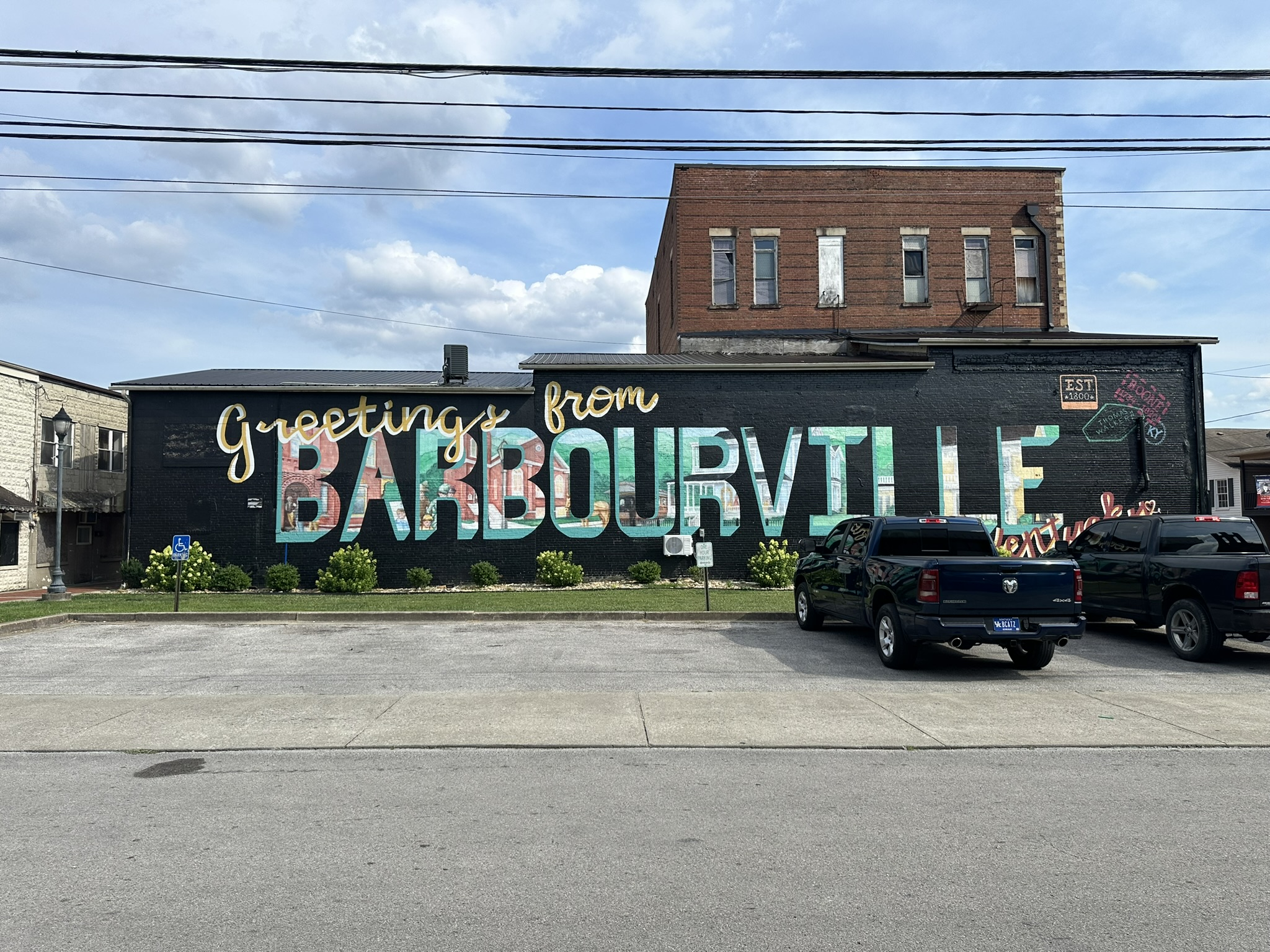
Greetings from Barbourville, 2026

Each year in early October, Barbourville hosts the Daniel Boone Festival, commemorating the pioneer who explored the area in 1775. The festival features open-air concerts, carnival attractions, a beauty pageant, a parade, and other events.

Starting in 2005, the Southern and Eastern Kentucky Tourism Development Association began sponsoring the Springtime Redbud Festival. The first celebration was at Pine Mountain State Resort Park, 20 miles (32 km) south of Barbourville, but the celebration is now held on the campus of Union College (Kentucky). The Redbud Festival in April first featured a quilting workshop and now includes other traditions and crafts, including storytelling, art shows, dulcimer workshops, and a cooking school.

Voters in Barbourville in 2015 approved alcohol sales in the city after 82 years of prohibition established by local law in 1933. The measure won in a special election in December 2015, by a little more than 60 votes. This approval came three and a half years after voters rejected alcohol sales in another special election. The measure will allow alcohol sales in both stores and restaurants.

== Education ==
=== Public schools ===
Public schools are administered by Knox County Public Schools. Schools in Barbourville include:

- Central Elementary School
- G. R. Hampton Elementary School
- Jesse D. Lay Elementary School
- Knox County Middle School
- Knox Central High School
- Dewitt Elementary
- Girdler Elementary
- Flat Lick Elementary
- Lynn Camp Schools

=== Independent schools ===
The Barbourville Independent School District administers Barbourville Elementary School and Barbourville High School.

=== Knox Appalachian School ===
The Knox Appalachian School is a public school serving the needs of the children committed to the Appalachian Children's Home.

=== Public library ===
Barbourville has a lending library, the Knox County Public Library.

=== Higher Education ===
- Union Commonwealth University

== Notable people ==
- Green Adams (1812–1884), United States congressman
- George Madison Adams (December 20, 1837 – April 6, 1920), U.S. congressman (1867–1875), Clerk of the United States House of Representatives in the 44th, 45th, and 46th Congresses (1875–1881), Secretary of State of Kentucky (1887–1891)
- James D. Black (1849–1938), Kentucky governor (1919)
- James S. Golden, U.S. representative, 1949–1955
- Samuel Freeman Miller, U.S. Supreme Court justice
- John M. Robsion Jr., U.S. representative 1953–1959
- Flem D. Sampson, Kentucky governor (1927–1931)
- William A. Stanfill (1892–1971), U.S. senator (1945–1946)
- Kenneth H. Tuggle, Lt. Governor of Kentucky (1943–1947)
- Silas Woodson, Missouri governor
