= Whitley County, Kentucky =

County in Kentucky, United States

- County
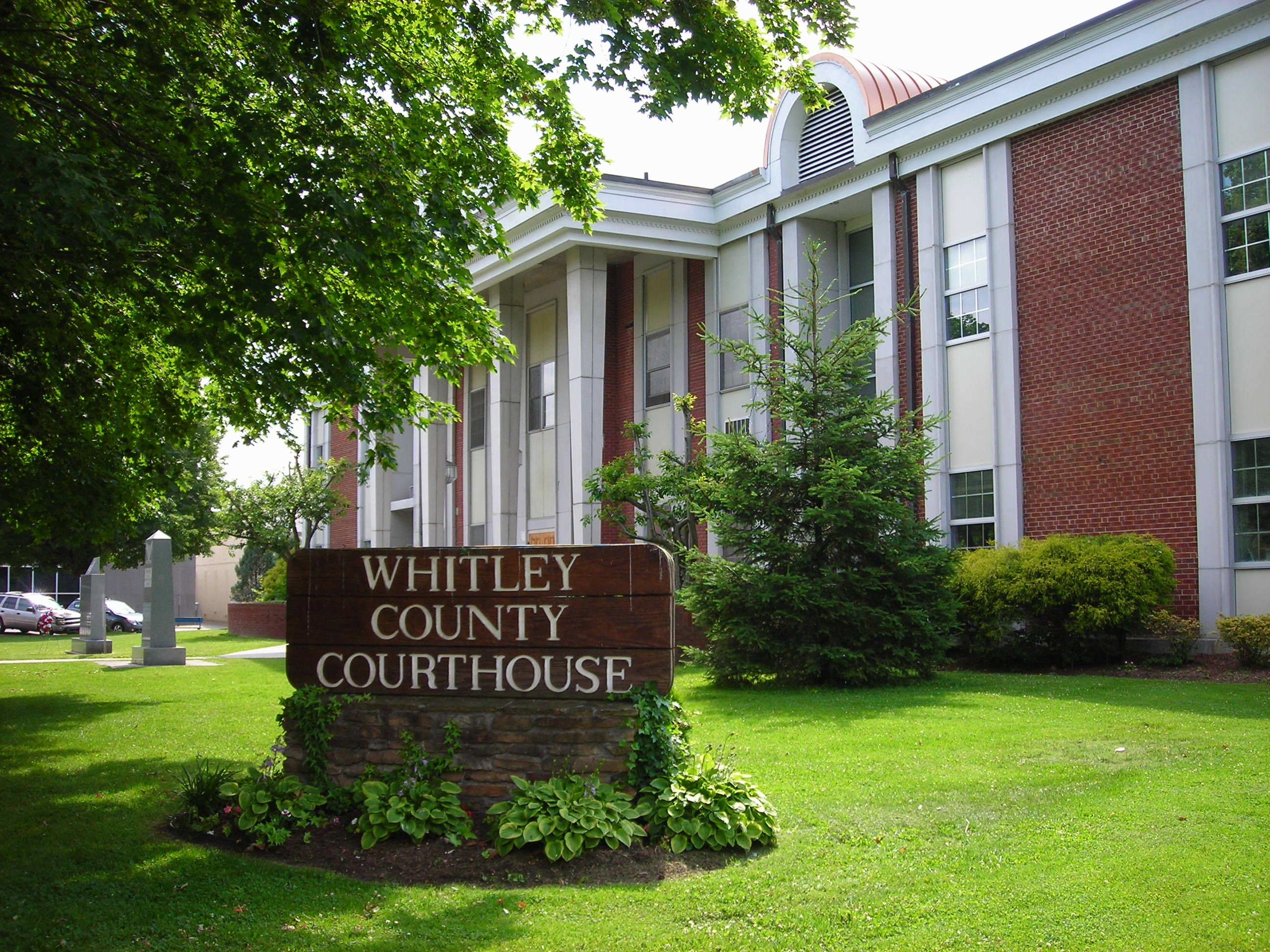
- Whitley County courthouse in Williamsburg

- Seal

- Location within the U.S. state of Kentucky
- Coordinates: 36°46′N 84°09′W
- Country: United States
- State: Kentucky
- Founded: January 17, 1818
- Named for: William Whitley
- Seat: Williamsburg
- Largest city: Corbin

Government
  - Judge/Executive: Pat White Jr. (R)

Area
  - Total: 445 sq mi (1,150 km^{2})
  - Land: 438 sq mi (1,130 km^{2})
  - Water: 7.3 sq mi (19 km^{2}) 1.6%

Population (2020)
  - Total: 36,712
  - Estimate (2025): 37,297 ▲
  - Density: 83.8/sq mi (32.4/km^{2})
- Time zone: UTC−5 (Eastern)
  - Summer (DST): UTC−4 (EDT)
- Congressional district: 5th
- Website: www.whitleycountyfiscalcourt.com

Whitley County is a county located in the southeastern part of the U.S. state of Kentucky. As of the 2020 census, the population was 36,712. Its county seat is at Williamsburg, though the largest city is Corbin, and the county's District Court (a trial court of limited jurisdiction) sits in both cities. Whitley County is included in the London, KY Micropolitan Statistical Area.

== History ==
The area now encompassed by Kentucky's Whitley County was first founded in 1772, when all of what is now the state of Kentucky was in the frontier county of Fincastle County, Virginia. Fincastle was divided in 1776, with the western portion named Kentucky County, Virginia. In 1780, Virginia set aside all land in Kentucky County for soldiers who had served in the Revolutionary War. Kentucky County was divided into 3 counties, Jefferson, Fayette, and Lincoln. Lincoln County was divided in 1799, with part of becoming Knox County. On January 17, 1818, the Legislature removed the southwest portion of Knox to create a separate subdivision, named Whitley County. In 1912, some of the previous Whitley area was partitioned off to create McCreary County.

The new county was given the name of Whitley in honor of William Whitley, noted pioneer and Indian fighter. In the years prior to 1818, many skirmishes were fought between Indians and hunters and trappers in the area. Colonel William Whitley, is famous locally for fighting many of these battles within the area, safeguarding the Wilderness Road, as well as for his service in the War of 1812, where he was killed at the Battle of the Thames. The county seat, Williamsburg, is also named for Colonel Whitley, with the first court held at the home of the town's earliest resident, Samuel Cox.

Thomas Walker was the first known white man to see Whitley County. His expedition began in 1750. During his passage he named the Cumberland River, after the Duke of Cumberland. The estimated population of Whitley County in 1818 was 500. It had increased to 7,522 by 1860; that number includes 186 slaves. Extension of a railroad spur into Whitley County (1883) provided significant impetus to its continued growth. Industry began to flourish - primarily lumber mills and coal mines. The Whitley County courthouse burned in 1931. It was replaced with federal funding.

Its rugged terrain, densely forested woodlands, and a history of conflict with local Indian tribes all combined to make for a very slow rate of growth in Whitley County. The development of the coal mining industry in the area towards the late 1800s spurred on population growth as poor families from neighboring states rushed into the county and led to the formation of Corbin, still the largest city in Whitley County.

North Corbin, just north of Whitley County is home to Sanders Cafe, which is the birthplace of Kentucky Fried Chicken. It was founded there by Harland David Sanders, better known as Colonel Sanders, in 1930.

== Politics ==
United States presidential election results for Whitley County, Kentucky
Year	Republican		Democratic		Third party(ies)	
Year	No.	%	No.	%	No.	%
1912	723	22.89%	1,388	43.94%	1,048	33.18%
1916	3,919	76.27%	1,171	22.79%	48	0.93%
1920	7,235	82.04%	1,556	17.64%	28	0.32%
1924	4,716	68.38%	1,413	20.49%	768	11.14%
1928	8,060	83.26%	1,610	16.63%	10	0.10%
1932	6,186	62.99%	3,576	36.42%	58	0.59%
1936	5,733	64.27%	3,175	35.59%	12	0.13%
1940	6,502	61.36%	4,078	38.49%	16	0.15%
1944	6,378	73.05%	2,352	26.94%	1	0.01%
1948	5,611	64.03%	2,932	33.46%	220	2.51%
1952	7,030	70.22%	2,958	29.55%	23	0.23%
1956	7,759	74.33%	2,656	25.45%	23	0.22%
1960	7,553	71.84%	2,961	28.16%	0	0.00%
1964	4,779	49.79%	4,782	49.82%	38	0.40%
1968	5,639	59.74%	2,134	22.61%	1,666	17.65%
1972	6,788	74.91%	2,199	24.27%	75	0.83%
1976	6,100	58.70%	4,212	40.53%	80	0.77%
1980	7,007	63.26%	3,889	35.11%	181	1.63%
1984	7,851	68.17%	3,575	31.04%	90	0.78%
1988	7,337	65.58%	3,794	33.91%	57	0.51%
1992	5,998	49.30%	4,600	37.81%	1,569	12.90%
1996	5,402	50.58%	4,174	39.08%	1,104	10.34%
2000	7,502	63.72%	4,101	34.83%	171	1.45%
2004	9,559	70.14%	3,985	29.24%	85	0.62%
2008	10,015	73.08%	3,484	25.42%	205	1.50%
2012	10,232	78.27%	2,683	20.52%	157	1.20%
2016	11,312	82.13%	2,067	15.01%	395	2.87%
2020	12,567	81.84%	2,552	16.62%	237	1.54%
2024	12,687	84.16%	2,237	14.84%	151	1.00%

Whitley County is a historically Republican county, and part of the pro-union bloc of southern Kentucky. Since 1900, the only Democrats who have carried the county were Woodrow Wilson in 1912 (when the Republican Party was bitterly divided) and Lyndon B. Johnson over Barry Goldwater in 1964, with Goldwater losing by three votes.

=== Local government ===
The current elected officials of Whitley County are:

- County Judge/Executive: Pat White Jr.
- County Magistrate: Scotty Harrison
- County Magistrate: Michael Jarboe
- County Magistrate: Raleigh Meadors
- County Magistrate: Mondo Cima
- County Attorney: Don R. Moses
- County Coroner: Andy Croley
- County Treasurer: Nicholas Simpson
- County Sheriff: Bill Elliotte
- County Surveyor: Robert Moses
- Property Valuation Administrator: Ronnie Moses
- County Clerk: Carolyn Wilson
- Circuit Court Clerk: Gary Barton

=== Elected officials ===
Elected officials as of January 3, 2025
U.S. House	Hal Rogers (R)	KY 5
Ky. Senate	Robert Stivers (R)	25
Ky. House	Nick Wilson (R)	82

== Public corruption ==
From 2009 to 2011, young journalist Adam Sulfridge and his editor Samantha Swindler of the Times-Tribune (Corbin, KY) worked to expose corruption in the Whitley County Sheriff's Department. Then-Sheriff Lawrence "Larry" Hodge (R) was first elected in 2002. Sheriff Hodge built his reputation as a tough crime fighter, but most residents did not know the Sheriff accepted money in exchange for allowing defendants to walk free. Sheriff Hodge also stole seized firearms and drug evidence, according to the Times-Tribune and affidavits filed by the Bureau of Alcohol, Tobacco, Firearms and Explosives.

On November 8, 2010 (while he was still Sheriff), a Whitley County grand jury returned a 21-count indictment against Hodge. He remained Sheriff until the end of 2010, as he was defeated in the Republican Party primary earlier in the year (May) in a landslide by Colan Harrell, who won in the general election in November. In the late spring of 2011, Hodge appeared in United States District Court for the Eastern District of Kentucky in London and pleaded to an 'information.' That summer, Hodge was sentenced to 15.5 years in federal prison for drug trafficking, money laundering and extorting persons arrested by his department (with Williamsburg attorney Ronnie "Ron" W. Reynolds, who was sentenced to three years in federal prison for his part in the crimes). Kentucky state auditors determined at least $200,000 had been stolen or was otherwise missing from Sheriff Hodge's official accounts.

== Geography ==
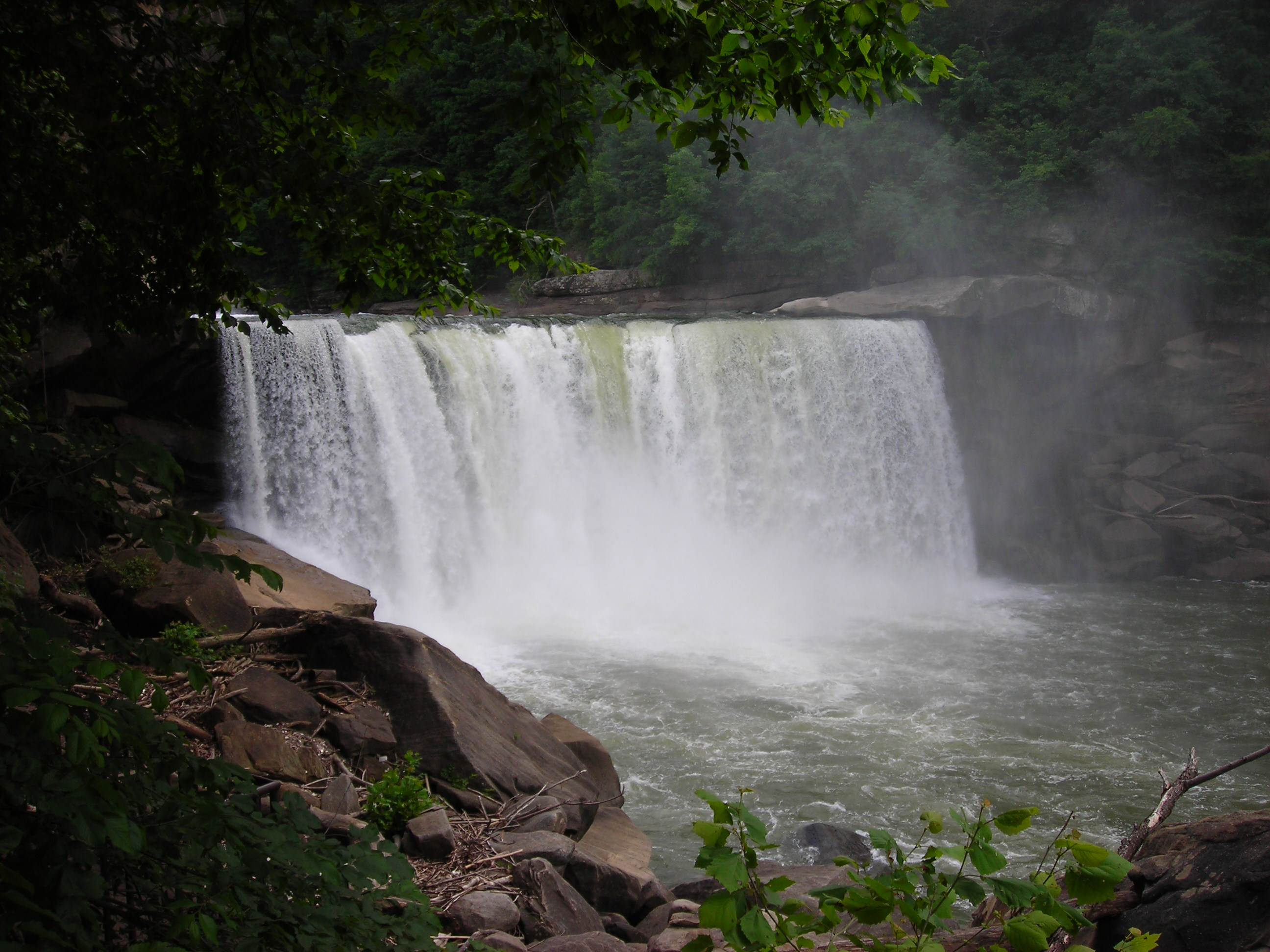
Cumberland Falls

According to the United States Census Bureau, the county has a total area of 445 square miles (1,150 km^{2}), of which 438 square miles (1,130 km^{2}) is land and 7.3 square miles (19 km^{2}) (1.6%) is water.

Whitley County is located within the Cumberland Plateau of southeastern Kentucky, which is greatly overlapped by the broad Eastern Coal Field region of the state. Because of its location in the midst of Cumberland Mountains, elevations in the county range from 723 to 2,220 feet (220 to 677 m) above sea level. 38,000 acres (150 km^{2}) of western Whitley County are preserved within the Daniel Boone National Forest. Cumberland Falls, in Cumberland Falls State Resort Park, is the largest waterfall in Kentucky. Both Daniel Boone Forest and Cumberland Falls State Park are operated by the Kentucky State Parks system, also located in the county. The county contains two regionally significant waterways, the Laurel and Cumberland rivers.

=== Geographic features ===
- Cumberland Falls
- Cumberland Plateau
- Cumberland River
- Jellico Mountain
- Laurel River
- Laurel River Lake

=== Adjacent counties ===
- Laurel County - north
- Knox County - northeast
- Bell County - east
- Claiborne County, Tennessee - southeast
- Campbell County, Tennessee - south
- McCreary County - west

=== National protected area ===
- Daniel Boone National Forest (part)

== Transportation ==
=== Major highways ===
- Interstate 75
- U.S. Route 25W
- Kentucky Route 11
- Kentucky Route 26
- Kentucky Route 90
- Kentucky Route 92
- Kentucky Route 312
- Kentucky Route 904

=== Airport ===
- KBYL, Williamsburg-Whitley County Airport

== Demographics ==
Historical population
Census	Pop.	Note	%±
1820	2,340		—
1830	3,806		62.6%
1840	4,673		22.8%
1850	7,447		59.4%
1860	7,762		4.2%
1870	8,278		6.6%
1880	12,000		45.0%
1890	17,590		46.6%
1900	25,015		42.2%
1910	31,982		27.9%
1920	27,749		−13.2%
1930	29,730		7.1%
1940	33,186		11.6%
1950	31,940		−3.8%
1960	25,815		−19.2%
1970	24,145		−6.5%
1980	33,396		38.3%
1990	33,326		−0.2%
2000	35,865		7.6%
2010	35,637		−0.6%
2020	36,712		3.0%
2025 (est.)	37,297	▲	1.6%
U.S. Decennial Census; 1790–1960 1900–1990; 1990–2000 2010–2020

=== 2020 census ===
As of the 2020 census, the county had a population of 36,712. The median age was 38.0 years. 24.3% of residents were under the age of 18 and 17.0% of residents were 65 years of age or older. For every 100 females there were 99.1 males, and for every 100 females age 18 and over there were 96.5 males age 18 and over.

The racial makeup of the county was 93.4% White, 1.5% Black or African American, 0.3% American Indian and Alaska Native, 0.6% Asian, 0.0% Native Hawaiian and Pacific Islander, 0.7% from some other race, and 3.4% from two or more races. Hispanic or Latino residents of any race comprised 1.9% of the population.

36.3% of residents lived in urban areas, while 63.7% lived in rural areas.

There were 13,794 households in the county, of which 32.4% had children under the age of 18 living with them and 28.9% had a female householder with no spouse or partner present. About 27.8% of all households were made up of individuals and 12.2% had someone living alone who was 65 years of age or older.

There were 15,469 housing units, of which 10.8% were vacant. Among occupied housing units, 67.2% were owner-occupied and 32.8% were renter-occupied. The homeowner vacancy rate was 1.0% and the rental vacancy rate was 4.8%.

=== 2000 census ===
As of the census of 2000, there were 35,865 people, 13,780 households, and 9,894 families residing in the county. The population density was 82 per square mile (32/km^{2}). There were 15,288 housing units at an average density of 35 per square mile (14/km^{2}). The racial makeup of the county was 98.37% White, 0.34% Black or African American, 0.23% Native American, 0.20% Asian, 0.01% Pacific Islander, 0.09% from other races, and 0.76% from two or more races. 0.69% of the population were Hispanics or Latinos of any race.

There were 13,780 households, out of which 33.70% had children under the age of 18 living with them, 54.90% were married couples living together, 13.00% had a female householder with no husband present, and 28.20% were non-families. 25.20% of all households were made up of individuals, and 10.20% had someone living alone who was 65 years of age or older. The average household size was 2.52 and the average family size was 3.01.

The age distribution was 25.80% under 18, 10.80% from 18 to 24, 27.30% from 25 to 44, 23.20% from 45 to 64, and 12.90% who were 65 or older. The median age was 35 years. For every 100 females, there were 93.30 males. For every 100 females age 18 and over, there were 89.60 males.

The median income for a household in the county was $22,075, and the median income for a family was $27,871. Males had a median income of $26,518 versus $17,001 for females. The per capita income for the county was $12,777. About 21.60% of families and 26.40% of the population were below the poverty line, including 34.10% of those under age 18 and 19.00% of those age 65 or over.

== Economy ==
Whitley County's economy has always relied heavily on its natural resources, particularly coal and timber from the area's heavily forested, mountainous terrain. Due to the rough territory created by the Cumberland Mountains, agriculture in the county has historically been less significant, although tobacco and corn are grown in some areas.

== Education ==
=== K-12 ===
Three public school districts serve the county:

- Whitley County School District
  - The largest of the three districts, it serves the county outside of the cities of Corbin and Williamsburg.
- Williamsburg Independent School District
  - Serves the city of Williamsburg with a single K-12 school.
- Corbin Independent School District
  - Serves the entire city of Corbin, making it one of the few districts in Kentucky whose boundaries cross county lines.

=== Colleges and universities ===
The University of the Cumberlands (formerly known as Cumberland College), located in Williamsburg, is the largest private university in Kentucky, and the only university with its main campus in Whitley County. The school's sports teams play on the NAIA level and provide college level sporting events for the local community.

In addition, Eastern Kentucky University maintains a branch campus in the Whitley County portion of Corbin just outside Woodbine.

== Alcohol sales ==
Whitley County, which had historically been dry, is now officially classified by the state as a moist county - sale of alcohol in the county is prohibited except in certain areas as voted on by the residents of the area, including at least one area of the county allowing full retail alcohol sales. In Whitley County, the areas that permit alcohol sales are:

- The city of Corbin voted in February 2012 to allow full retail alcohol sales in the city limits after voting in 2006 to allow by the drink alcohol sales in qualifying restaurants.
- The city of Williamsburg voted in June 2016 to allow full retail alcohol sales in the city limits after voting in 2012 to allow by-the-drink alcohol sales in qualifying restaurants.

== Communities ==
=== Cities ===
- Corbin (partly in Knox and Laurel counties)
- Williamsburg (county seat)

=== Census-designated places ===
- Emlyn
- Pleasant View
- Rockholds

=== Unincorporated communities ===
- Canada Town
- Carpenter
- Gatliff
- Goldbug
- Julip
- Mountain Ash
- Nevisdale
- Packard
- Piney Grove
- Saxton
- Siler
- Wofford
- Woodbine
- Yaden

== See also ==
- National Register of Historic Places listings in Whitley County, Kentucky
