= Knox County, Kentucky =

County in Kentucky, United States

- County
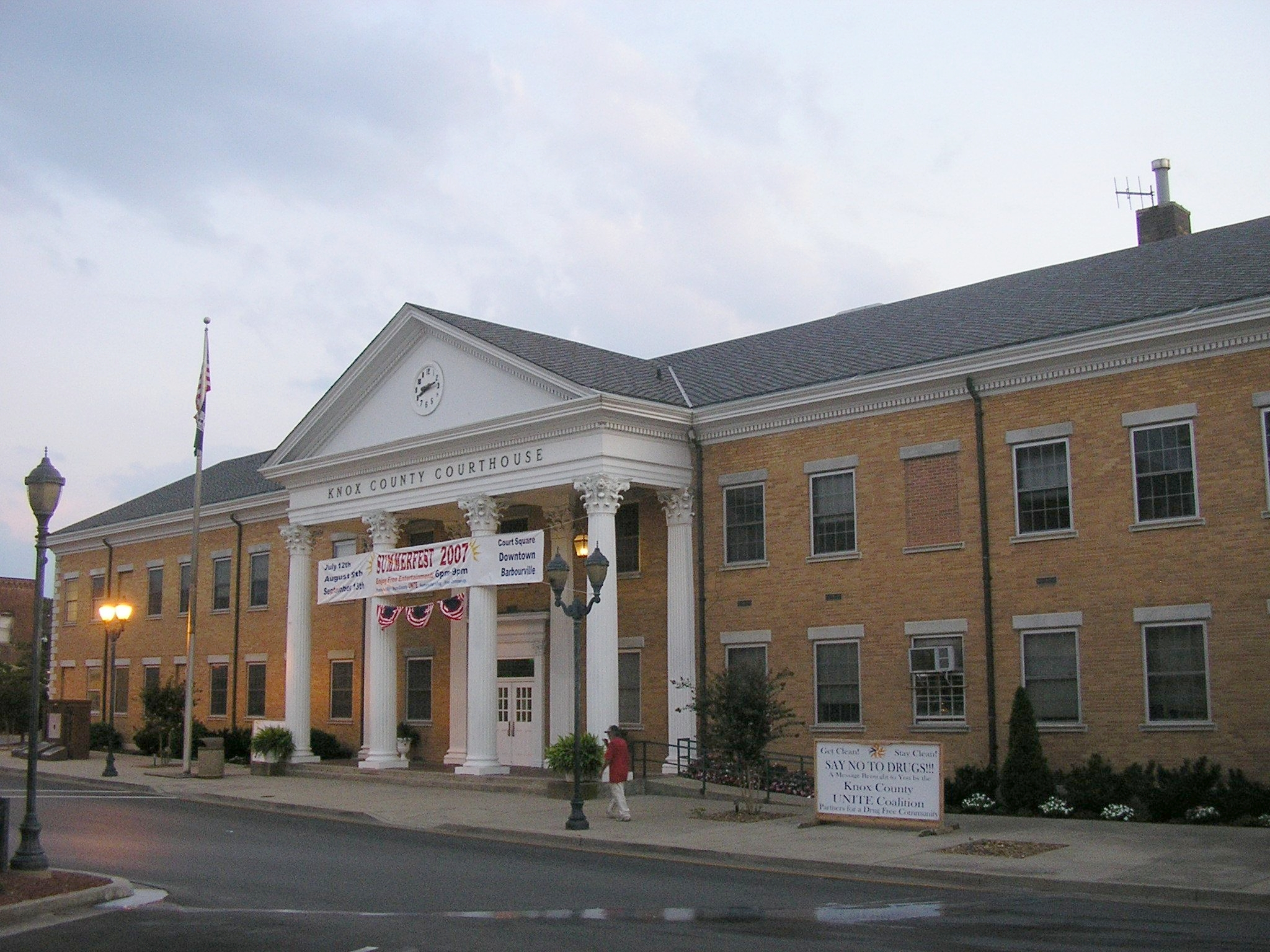
- Knox County courthouse in Barbourville

- Location within the U.S. state of Kentucky
- Coordinates: 36°53′26″N 83°51′15″W
- Country: United States
- State: Kentucky
- Founded: December 19, 1799
- Named for: Henry Knox
- Seat: Barbourville
- Largest city: Barbourville

Government
  - Judge/Executive: Mike Mitchell (R)

Area
  - Total: 388 sq mi (1,000 km^{2})
  - Land: 386 sq mi (1,000 km^{2})
  - Water: 1.5 sq mi (3.9 km^{2}) 0.4%

Population (2020)
  - Total: 30,193
  - Estimate (2025): 29,532 ▼
  - Density: 78.2/sq mi (30.2/km^{2})
- Time zone: UTC−5 (Eastern)
  - Summer (DST): UTC−4 (EDT)
- Congressional district: 5th
- Website: knoxfiscalcourt.com

Knox County is a county located in Appalachia near the southeastern corner of the U.S. state of Kentucky. As of the 2020 census, the population was 30,193. Its county seat is Barbourville. The county is named for General Henry Knox. It is one of the few coal-producing counties in Kentucky that has not suffered massive population loss. Knox County is included in the Corbin, KY Micropolitan Statistical Area.

== History ==
Knox County was formed on December 19, 1799, from portions of Lincoln County. It is usually assumed to be named for Henry Knox of Massachusetts, a Revolutionary War general and the first United States Secretary of War. However, there is strong evidence that it was actually named for James Knox. Knox was a pre-war explorer and long hunter, a veteran of Dunmore's War and the Revolutionary War, a pioneer guide, road-builder, and legislator. Knox had used the Wilderness Road, which traverses the county, as an explorer and later oversaw its improvement into a wagon road.

The Civil War Battle of Barbourville was fought on September 19, 1861, between 800 Confederate soldiers from General Felix Zollicoffer's command and 300 Union troops who attempted to defend the Union's Camp Andrew Johnson. The Union men tore up the planks on the bridge in an attempt to keep the Confederates from crossing, but the more numerous Confederates succeeded anyway. They destroyed the camp and seized the arms and equipment it contained.

The present courthouse, completed in 1964, is the fifth courthouse to serve the county.

The county has historically had coal mining as the driver of its economy. Unlike other areas of southeastern Kentucky, it has continued to maintain jobs and much of its population.

== Geography ==
According to the United States Census Bureau, the county has a total area of 388 square miles (1,000 km^{2}), of which 386 square miles (1,000 km^{2}) is land and 1.5 square miles (3.9 km^{2}) (0.4%) is water.

=== Adjacent counties ===
- Clay County (northeast)
- Bell County (southeast)
- Whitley County (southwest)
- Laurel County (northwest)

== Economy ==
The largest employers in Knox County are Health Care & Social Assistance (1,406 people), Retail Trade (1,331 people), and Educational Services (1,226 people). But the highest-paying jobs are with mining, quarrying, and oil and gas extraction. Real estate sales, and rental and leasing also pay well, followed by finance and insurance.

== Demographics ==
Historical population
Census	Pop.	Note	%±
1810	5,875		—
1820	3,661		−37.7%
1830	4,315		17.9%
1840	5,722		32.6%
1850	7,050		23.2%
1860	7,707		9.3%
1870	8,294		7.6%
1880	10,587		27.6%
1890	13,762		30.0%
1900	17,372		26.2%
1910	22,116		27.3%
1920	24,172		9.3%
1930	26,266		8.7%
1940	31,029		18.1%
1950	30,409		−2.0%
1960	25,258		−16.9%
1970	23,689		−6.2%
1980	30,239		27.6%
1990	29,676		−1.9%
2000	31,795		7.1%
2010	31,883		0.3%
2020	30,193		−5.3%
2025 (est.)	29,532	▼	−2.2%
U.S. Decennial Census; 1790-1960 1900-1990; 1990-2000 2010-2020

=== 2020 census ===
As of the 2020 census, the county had a population of 30,193. The median age was 40.9 years. 23.2% of residents were under the age of 18 and 18.5% of residents were 65 years of age or older. For every 100 females there were 93.1 males, and for every 100 females age 18 and over there were 90.7 males age 18 and over.

The racial makeup of the county was 94.8% White, 1.0% Black or African American, 0.3% American Indian and Alaska Native, 0.3% Asian, 0.0% Native Hawaiian and Pacific Islander, 0.4% from some other race, and 3.3% from two or more races. Hispanic or Latino residents of any race comprised 1.1% of the population.

38.0% of residents lived in urban areas, while 62.0% lived in rural areas.

There were 12,047 households in the county, of which 30.4% had children under the age of 18 living with them and 30.9% had a female householder with no spouse or partner present. About 30.7% of all households were made up of individuals and 13.9% had someone living alone who was 65 years of age or older.

There were 13,723 housing units, of which 12.2% were vacant. Among occupied housing units, 64.8% were owner-occupied and 35.2% were renter-occupied. The homeowner vacancy rate was 1.7% and the rental vacancy rate was 10.4%.

=== 2000 census ===
As of the census of 2000, there were 31,795 people, 12,416 households, and 8,939 families residing in the county. The population density was 82 per square mile (32/km^{2}). There were 13,999 housing units at an average density of 36 per square mile (14/km^{2}). The racial makeup of the county was 97.84% White, 0.82% Black or African American, 0.25% Native American, 0.17% Asian, 0.02% Pacific Islander, 0.08% from other races, and 0.82% from two or more races. 0.57% of the population were Hispanic or Latino of any race.

There were 12,416 households, out of which 34.40% had children under the age of 18 living with them, 54.30% were married couples living together, 13.60% had a female householder with no husband present, and 28.00% were non-families. 25.70% of all households were made up of individuals, and 10.60% had someone living alone who was 65 years of age or older. The average household size was 2.51 and the average family size was 3.01.

In the county, the population was spread out, with 26.20% under the age of 18, 9.70% from 18 to 24, 28.10% from 25 to 44, 23.20% from 45 to 64, and 12.80% who were 65 years of age or older. The median age was 35 years. For every 100 females, there were 92.90 males. For every 100 females age 18 and over, there were 88.70 males.

The median income for a household in the county was $18,294, and the median income for a family was $23,136. Males had a median income of $24,833 versus $18,390 for females. The per capita income for the county was $10,660. About 29.60% of families and 34.80% of the population were below the poverty line, including 42.40% of those under age 18 and 28.90% of those age 65 or over.

== Politics ==
United States presidential election results for Knox County, Kentucky
Year	Republican		Democratic		Third party(ies)	
Year	No.	%	No.	%	No.	%
1912	1,391	39.02%	888	24.91%	1,286	36.07%
1916	3,192	73.18%	1,126	25.81%	44	1.01%
1920	5,228	76.68%	1,534	22.50%	56	0.82%
1924	3,767	67.34%	1,537	27.48%	290	5.18%
1928	5,928	79.76%	1,497	20.14%	7	0.09%
1932	4,513	56.85%	3,375	42.52%	50	0.63%
1936	4,921	58.97%	3,419	40.97%	5	0.06%
1940	5,003	60.06%	3,319	39.84%	8	0.10%
1944	5,178	68.40%	2,385	31.51%	7	0.09%
1948	4,241	58.98%	2,814	39.13%	136	1.89%
1952	5,470	66.28%	2,766	33.52%	17	0.21%
1956	6,341	71.39%	2,539	28.59%	2	0.02%
1960	5,814	66.29%	2,956	33.71%	0	0.00%
1964	3,583	46.11%	4,150	53.41%	37	0.48%
1968	4,388	57.77%	2,244	29.55%	963	12.68%
1972	5,017	72.93%	1,805	26.24%	57	0.83%
1976	4,931	56.93%	3,642	42.05%	88	1.02%
1980	5,539	59.95%	3,543	38.34%	158	1.71%
1984	5,730	65.87%	2,932	33.71%	37	0.43%
1988	4,903	62.21%	2,919	37.03%	60	0.76%
1992	5,011	51.00%	3,787	38.54%	1,027	10.45%
1996	4,502	49.50%	3,736	41.08%	857	9.42%
2000	6,058	61.13%	3,690	37.24%	162	1.63%
2004	8,108	67.41%	3,822	31.78%	98	0.81%
2008	8,150	71.56%	3,074	26.99%	165	1.45%
2012	8,467	76.28%	2,484	22.38%	149	1.34%
2016	9,885	82.29%	1,761	14.66%	366	3.05%
2020	11,012	82.97%	2,114	15.93%	147	1.11%
2024	11,178	84.82%	1,821	13.82%	180	1.37%

Knox County is part of the Unionist bloc of counties covering the eastern Pennyroyal Plateau and the western part of the Eastern Coalfield. Like all counties in this bloc, Knox County is majority white by a high proportion, strongly opposed secession, and has been rock-ribbed Republican ever since the Civil War. The only Democrat to carry Knox County since then has been Lyndon Johnson during his 1964 landslide.

On the state level, Knox County has historically been strongly Republican, having only voted for the Democratic candidate for Governor six times since 1900. Since 2000, Knox County has voted for the Democratic candidate only once, in 2011.

=== Elected officials ===
Elected officials as of January 3, 2025
U.S. House	Hal Rogers (R)	KY 5
Ky. Senate	Robert Stivers (R)	25
Ky. House	Tom Smith (R)	86

== Education ==
=== K–12 ===
Three public school districts serve the county:

- Knox County Public Schools serves the entire county, including the cities of Barbourville and Corbin. The following are schools funded by the Knox County Public School District (grades served in parentheses):
  - Central Elementary (PS–5)
  - Dewitt Elementary (PS–5)
  - Flat Lick Elementary (PS–5)
  - Girdler Elementary (PS–5)
  - G.R. Hampton Elementary (PS–5)
  - Jesse D. Lay Elementary (PS–5)
  - Lynn Camp Elementary (PS–5)
  - Knox County Middle School (6–8)
  - Lynn Camp High School (6–12)
  - Knox Appalachian School (5–12)
  - Knox Central High School (9–12)
  - Knox County Learning Academy (9–12)
- Barbourville Independent School District serves the city of Barbourville at a single campus with elementary and high school sections (grades PS–12).
- The Corbin Independent School District serves the entire city of Corbin, making it one of the few districts in Kentucky whose boundaries cross county lines. The following are schools funded by the Corbin Independent School School District (grades served in parentheses):
  - Corbin Primary School (K–2)
  - Corbin Elementary (3–4)
  - Corbin Intermediate (5–6)
  - Corbin Middle School (7–8)
  - Corbin High School (9–12)

=== Higher education ===
Union College, a small Methodist-affiliated liberal arts college, is located in Barbourville.

== Communities ==
=== Cities ===
- Barbourville (county seat)
- Corbin (primarily in Whitley County)

=== Census-designated places ===
- Artemus
- Flat Lick
- North Corbin (primarily in Laurel County)

=== Other unincorporated places ===
- Gray
- Kay Jay

== Wildlife ==
- A portion of the 54,136 acres (21,908 ha) Cumberland Forest WMA sits in the county.

== See also ==
- Dry county
- National Register of Historic Places listings in Knox County, Kentucky
