= 2025 Somerset–London tornado =

EF4 tornado in Kentucky, U.S.

Coordinates: 37.02°N 85.03°W

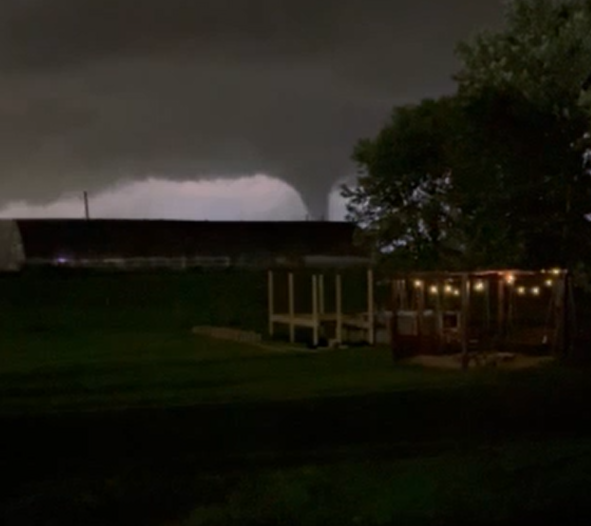
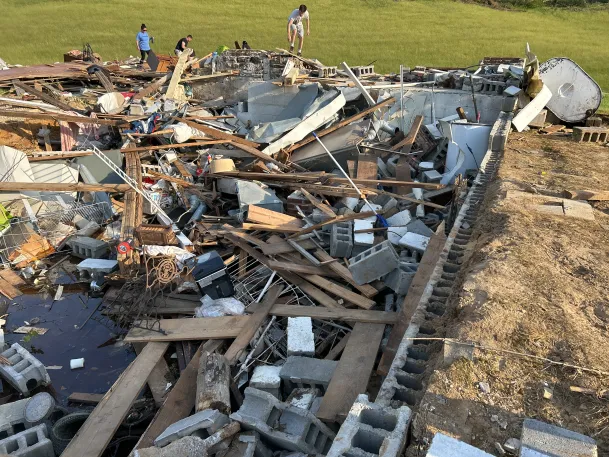
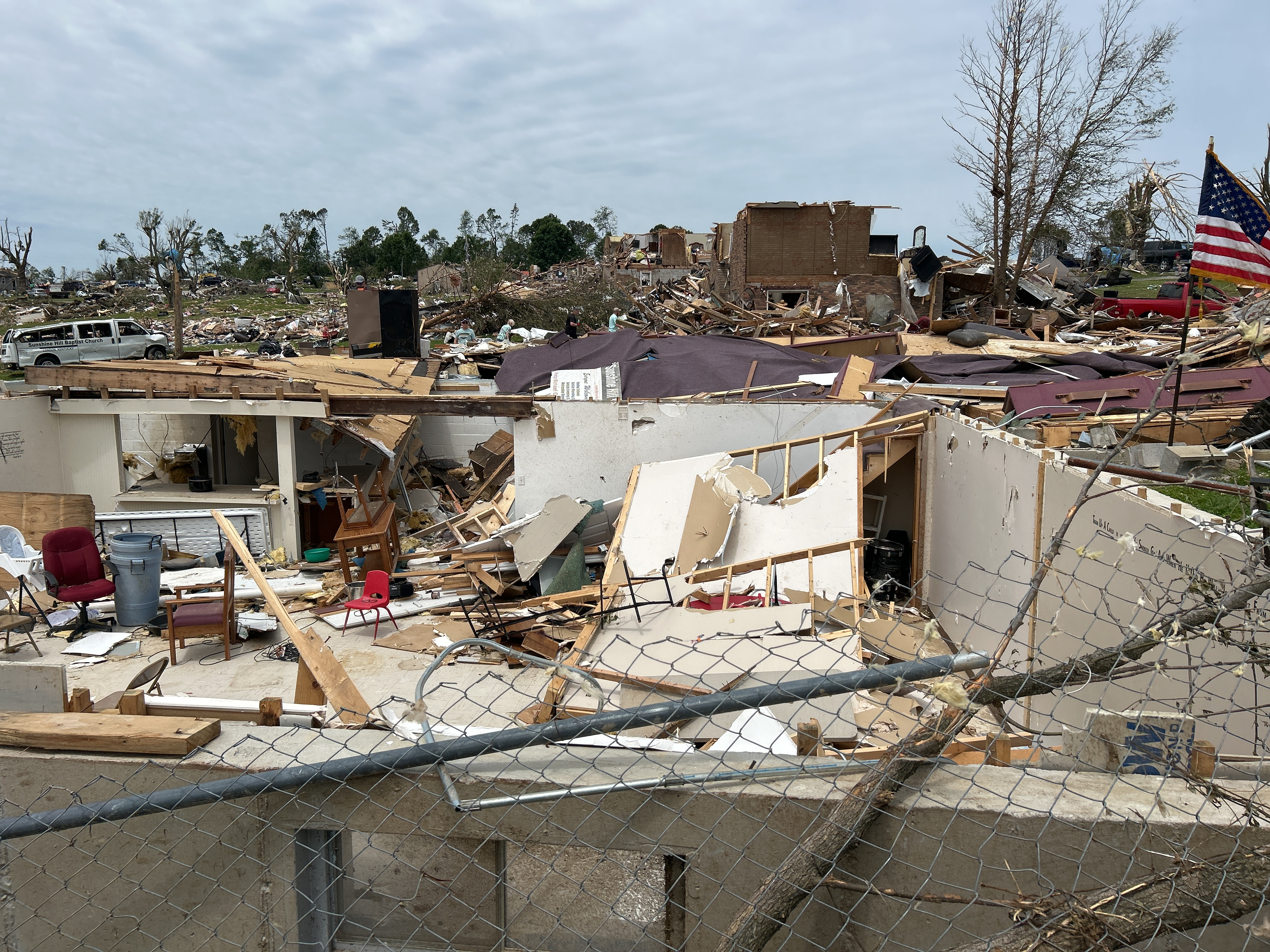
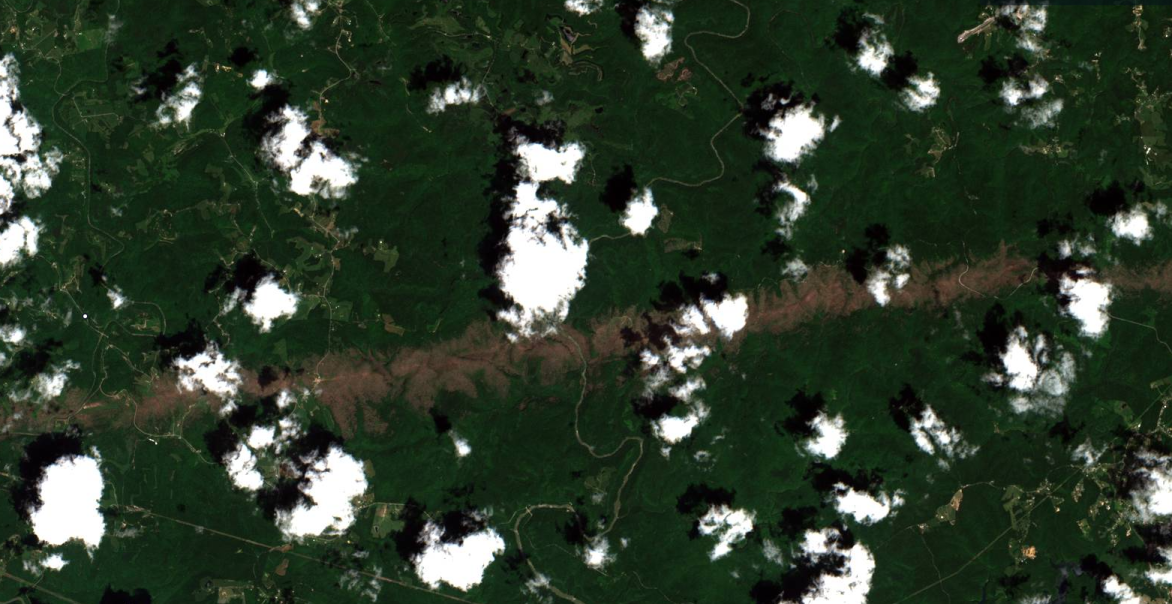
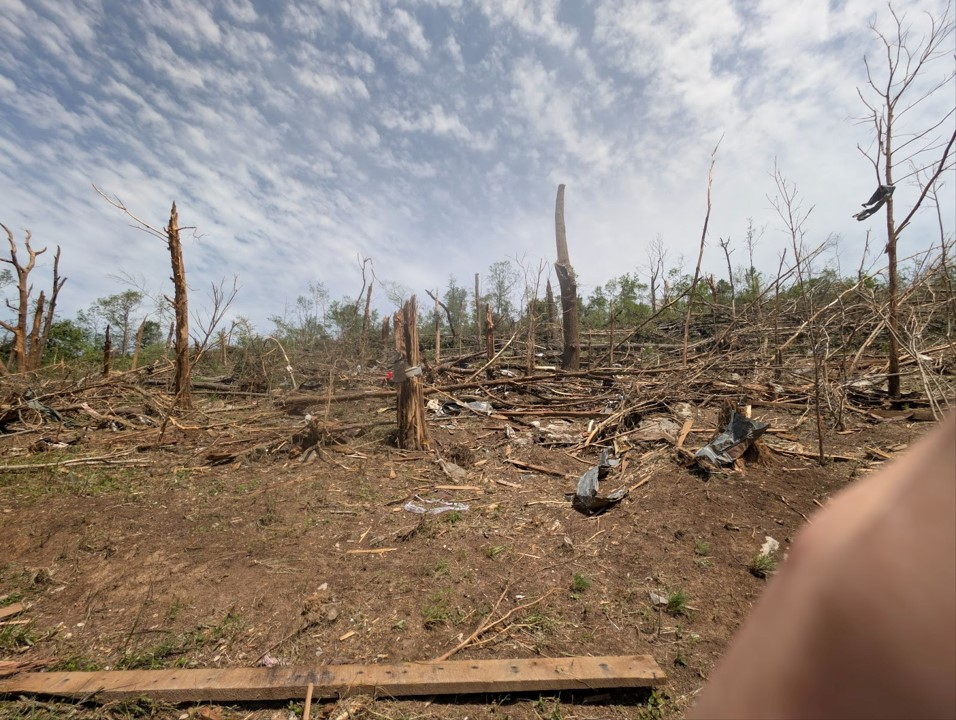
- Clockwise from top: A photo of the tornado in Somerset, The Sunshine Hills Baptist Church in London swept away at low-end EF4 intensity, Violent tree debarking and stubbing in the Daniel Boone National Forest, Deeply pronounced "damage scar" through the Daniel Boone National Forest, imaged by Sentinel-2 on May 23, A home northwest of Mount Victory was leveled by the tornado

Meteorological history
- Formed: May 16, 2025, 9:27 p.m. CDT (UTC–05:00)
- Dissipated: May 16, 2025, 11:56 p.m. EDT (UTC-04:00)
- Duration: 1 hour, 29 minutes

EF4 tornado
- on the Enhanced Fujita scale
- Max width: 1,700 yards (0.97 mi; 1.6 km)
- Path length: 60.08 miles (96.69 km)
- Highest winds: 170 mph (270 km/h)

Overall effects
- Fatalities: 19 direct (+1 indirect)
- Injuries: 108
- Damage: $350 million (2025 USD) (Laurel County only)
- Areas affected: Russell County, Pulaski County (specifically Somerset), Laurel County (specifically London)
- Part of the tornado outbreak of May 15–16, 2025 and Tornadoes of 2025

In the late evening hours of May 16, 2025, a large and deadly nocturnal EF4 tornado moved through the western Cumberland Plateau, impacting the Kentucky cities of Somerset and London. The tornado, which was on the ground for almost an hour and a half, killed 19 people and injured 108 others along a 60 mi (97 km) track. It was the second tornado that day rated EF4 by the National Weather Service, with the first one occurring hours prior in Illinois as part of a major tornado outbreak in mid-May.

The supercell that produced this tornado initiated over 400 miles (640 km) away in the south-central Missouri Ozarks region. The supercell produced few tornadoes along its track through Missouri, Illinois, and Kentucky, including a small but intense EF3 tornado that brought destructive impacts to the area south of the village of Blodgett: several homes suffered major damage, mobile homes were destroyed, and trees were snapped. Two fatalities occurred and ten others were injured. Afterwards, the supercell crossed the Ohio River into Kentucky. The supercell produced a brief EF1 tornado near Lamasco and an EF2 tornado near Allegre, damaging or destroying several mobile homes and outbuildings. After the London tornado dissipated, the supercell eventually got absorbed into the mesoscale convective system.

The tornado first touched down in central Russell County, initially causing minor damage to trees and infrastructure before quickly intensifying to EF3 strength, inflicting major damage to a home near Whittle. The tornado weakened and shrunk after crossing into Pulaski County. After crossing Lake Cumberland, the tornado struck the southern side of Somerset at low-end EF3 intensity, inflicting severe to major damage to several homes and businesses. After leaving the city, the tornado tore through parts of the Daniel Boone National Forest at mid-range EF3 to low-end EF4 intensity, shredding and snapping several trees and destroying a couple of homes as the tornado entered Laurel County. The tornado then impacted the southern side of London at low-end EF4 intensity, inflicting catastrophic destruction to several homes, neighborhoods, and industrial buildings, resulting in several fatalities. The tornado dissipated shortly after near the community of Lida. The tornado was on the ground for 90 minutes and tracked for 60 miles (97 km).

Recovery efforts immediately following the tornado were intensive, with several aid organizations, including The Salvation Army and the Federal Emergency Management Agency, traveling to London with relief supplies. Following the tornado, media outlets claimed National Weather Service office in Jackson, Kentucky was understaffed due to the staffing cuts made by Department of Government Efficiency, although the office was fully staffed at the same time of the tornado.

== Meteorological synopsis ==
On May 12, the Storm Prediction Center outlined a Day 5 risk for middle Mississippi River valley. A pacific front associated with May 15 convection was expected to stall across the middle Mississippi and lower Ohio Valleys before moving north as a potent warm front. Ensemble Guidance models at the time were hinting at dewpoints reaching between mid to upper 60s, possibly reaching into low 70s, with the likelihood of one or more linear segments to traverse across the mid-Mississippi, lower Ohio, to potentially into Tennessee valleys. On May 14 at 0730 UTC, The Storm Prediction Center outlined a slight (2/5) risk over much of the Ozark Plateau, Mississippi and Ohio River Valleys, with possibility of seeing scattered discrete supercells, organized clusters, including the chance of a long-lived mesoscale convective system. Medium and long-range guidance model suggest the development of thunderstorms along the warm front, with a surface trough ahead of the mid-level wave will mature. The models depicted an environment where the mean level convective available potential energy (MLCAPE) values were around 3000 J/kg and effective bulk shear of 40-50kn, developing a potent environment, with thermodynamic/kinematic conditions supporting development of long-lived severe weather. Despite this, there were still uncertainties around the event, with persistent disagreement among models still evident in regards to the northward extent of the warm sector, with some recent model runs showing the likelihood of persistent morning convection, and other model runs showing less morning convection.

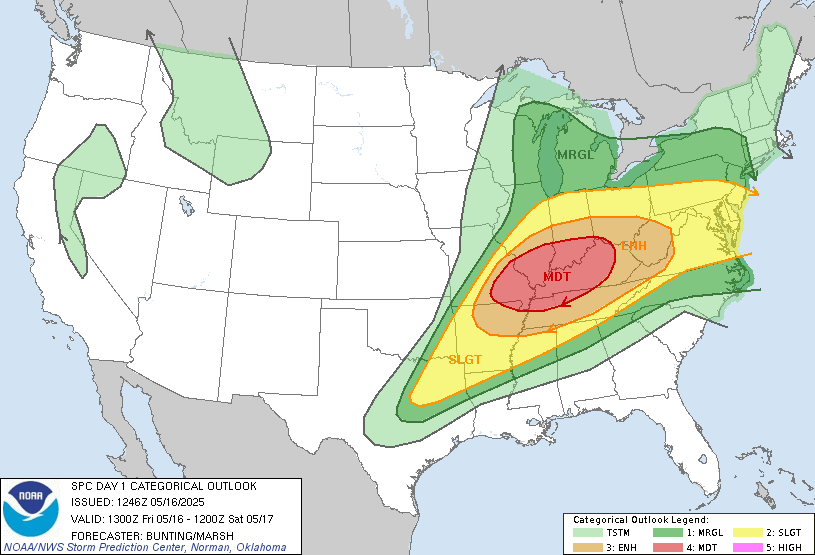
Storm Prediction Center outlook issued at 1300 UTC on May 16, 2025, outlining a moderate risk for the Ohio Valley

In the evening hours on the same day at 1730 UTC, an enhanced (3/5) risk was outlined for most of lower Ohio Valley, with one or more organized cluster and couple more discrete supercells. An upper-level trough over the southern High Plains will traverse quickly across the Midwest, strong mid to upper southwesterly flow will overspread the region, the 500 mb jet stream was forecasted to be around 70-90kn. A highly moist airmass was forecasted to be in place extending from southern Missouri into southern Illinois and into northeast Ohio. Increased southerly flow ahead of the cold-front allows the warm-front along the I-70 corridor to lift north throughout the afternoon. Strong destabilization was forecasted to occur as a result of steep mid-level from cooling aloft and dewpoints of mid to upper 60s. Low-level jet around 45-60kn was forecasted to overspread the region due to peak daylight heating into the evening.

The Storm Prediction Center outlined a moderate (4/5) risk over much of the middle Mississippi and lower Ohio Valleys on May 16, with the greatest risk over southeastern Missouri, far northeastern Arkansas, northwestern Tennessee, southern Illinois and Indiana, far southwestern Ohio, and much of Kentucky. The upper-level low centered over the border of North Dakota and Minnesota was expected to move eastward into the middle Mississippi Valley. Following persisting convection from the previous day, a warm front swept over a large region from Missouri to the Ohio and Tennessee Valley regions. Over this region, the atmosphere was expected to sharply destabilize, with mean level convective available potential energy (MLCAPE) values exceeding 2500 J/kg, strong mid-level flow, and deep-layer wind shear exceeding 50 kn (58 mph; 93 km/h) expected to help develop and intensify severe weather and associated supercells. The 06z outlook issued by Chris Broyles and Harry Weinman mentioned the risk of "a high-end long-track tornado...from far southeast Missouri...into western Kentucky".

== Tornado summary ==
=== Eastern Russell County to Somerset ===
Warning chronology of the tornado
Type	Locations included	Time (EDT)	Ref.
Radar-indicated	Jamestown; Somerset; Elihu; Grade	10:29 p.m.	
Confirmed (via weather spotters)	Somerset; Grade; Dykes; Mount Victory	10:57 p.m.	
PDS (spotter confirmed)	Ruth; Somerset; London; Levi Jackson State Park; Lesbas	11:07 p.m.	
PDS (radar confirmed)	Ruth; Somerset; London; Levi Jackson State Park; Lesbas	11:18 p.m.	
Continuation of PDS (radar confirmed)	Ruth; Somerset; London; Levi Jackson State Park; Lesbas	11:34 p.m.	

The tornado first touched down in Russell County northeast of Jamestown at 10:26 p.m. EDT. At the touchdown point, the tornado damaged the roof of an outbuilding as it started eastward and crossed KY 619. The tornado then shattered windows and inflicted roof and siding damage to a home before crossing Caney Creek, uprooting trees on the hillsides on both sides of the creek. The tornado then turned east-northeastward, rolling and destroying a mobile home before crossing McFarland Creek and moving into Whittle and crossing KY 1611. The tornado partially removed the roof off a home and an outbuilding as it moved east-northeastward and crossed KY 76 before rapidly intensifying to high-end EF2 intensity, significantly debarking and stubbing hardwood trees, and destroying mobile homes and a camper. The tornado then crossed Alligator Creek and continued east-northeastward at low-end EF2 strength, snapping and uprooting trees, and destroying a garage. It then briefly strengthened to low-end EF3 intensity as it crossed Gosser Ridge Road, unroofing and destroying most of the exterior walls of a one-story brick home, with another home sustaining major EF1 roof damage. Several trees nearby were snapped.

Video of the tornado in Somerset

The small tornado maintained low-end EF3 intensity as it crossed into Pulaski County and continued eastward across House Fork Creek and Wolf Creek, stubbing and debarking hardwood trees. The tornado then weakened slightly and struck a farmstead on a Cundiff Road at high-end EF2 strength, unroofing a home and destroying several outbuildings as well as a small and large solo. The tornado then briefly reached low-end EF3 intensity on Cooks Chapel Road, unroofing and knocking down the exterior walls of a home and stubbing more trees. It then weakened significantly to low-end EF2 intensity as it crossed KY 196, unroofing another home, heavily damaging or destroying multiple outbuildings, and snapping trees. The tornado then narrowed and weakened further to EF1 intensity as it continued eastward and passed south of Faubush, damaging outbuildings and snapping trees along KY 1664. One small area of EF2 damage occurred on Oakes Road with a suffering considerable roof and exterior damage. The tornado then continued eastward at EF1 intensity as it passed south of Nancy and crossed KY 761 and KY 235 while gradually shrinking in size. Homes suffered roof damage, outbuildings were destroyed, and more trees were snapped. The tornado then crossed Clifty Creek and struck a neighborhood south of KY 80, causing heavy EF1-EF2 roof damage to homes and snapping trees and power poles. The tornado then narrowed even further and crossed Fishing Creek at EF1 strength before descending a steep hillside across KY 1577. After crossing KY 914 and entering the southern side of Somerset, the tornado strengthened and reached EF2 intensity as it continued down the hillside. Two homes were destroyed, other homes and apartment building suffered heavy roof and exterior wall damage, vehicles were damaged, and trees were snapped or uprooted. The tornado then impacted the Somerset Cinemas 8 building, about 100 people were inside watching movies at the time the building was struck. The building received minor roof and structural damage. A strip mall along Parkers Mill Way received major damage to its roof at mid-range EF2 strength.

The southside wall of the Pulaski County Area Technology Center sustained complete collapse. Along US 27/KY 1642, the tornado intensified to high-end EF2 intensity. The Redeemer Lutheran Church of Somerset received heavy damage, with the front and back walls of the church collapsing, major roof damage was also noted to occur. Multiple trees and power poles around the church were snapped or twisted. Adjacent to the church, the Baxter's Coffee restaurant also sustained major damage, with the roof being torn away and two walls collapsing. The Speedway and South Central Bank received significant roof and structural damage, with metal and electric power poles around the area snapped. The Hardee's restaurant had all their windows blown out and the sign broken and bent. Afterwards, the tornado sustained high-end EF2 intensity as it crossed Southern School Road. The Independent Opportunities Community Hab was completely flattened, with other nearby metal buildings sustaining significant damage.

Along Regency Drive and Weddle Lane, the tornado intensified to low-end EF3 strength, removing most of the roof and second story of the recently built Warrior Martial Arts building. At the South Kentucky Rural Electric Cooperative Corporation facility, the tornado inflicted major damage to the main office building and unroofed and collapsed most of the warehouse next to the building. From there, the tornado continued eastward at EF2 intensity, damaging a metal building system, destroying a small shed, and snapping more trees and power poles. More trees were snapped or uprooted at a farm where a small barn was shifted off its foundation, a silo was destroyed, metal roofing was removed from a building and several vehicles were damaged. In all, around a dozen homes and 20 businesses were destroyed in the Somerset area.

The tornado then crossed KY 914 again, snapping and uprooting swaths of trees as it exited Somerset. After crossing Pitman Creek, the tornado demolished an outbuilding along Doc Newell Road before crossing the Cincinnati Southern Railway and impacting a home along KY 2747 at low-end EF3 intensity. A poorly built home was blown off its foundation. The tornado maintained low-end EF3 intensity after crossing KY 1247 and impacted a small neighborhood along Curtis Ray Road. Several homes were substantially damaged, with the homes closest to the tornado's path being partially leveled. Several trees were snapped or uprooted, an outbuilding was destroyed, and cars and trailers at a junk yard were moved or flipped over. Along Elihu Cabin Hollow Road, a recently built barndominiam/metal framed house was completely swept away at mid-range EF2 intensity, with most of the debris being unable to be located, a shed on this property was also thrown 100 yd (91 m) clockwise to the other side of the home.

Downstream from the home, another group of homes were impacted at high-end EF2 intensity. A top part of a home was torn away, leaving the subfloor left, a small outbuilding nearby was destroyed. Multiple trees were downed and uprooted around the property. Southwest of the community of Alcalde, the tornado intensified to low-end EF3 strength. Along KY 769, a large transmission tower was crumpled and thrown 250 yd (230 m). Several softwood trees were severely debarked, a home was unroofed and its side exterior walls collapsed, two barns were wiped clean off their foundation, and several trees were substantially snapped and uprooted. The tornado continued to produce heavy EF2 tree damage as it moved eastward. It also knocked over an RV and collapsed a metal barn on KY 1643.

=== Daniel Boone National Forest ===
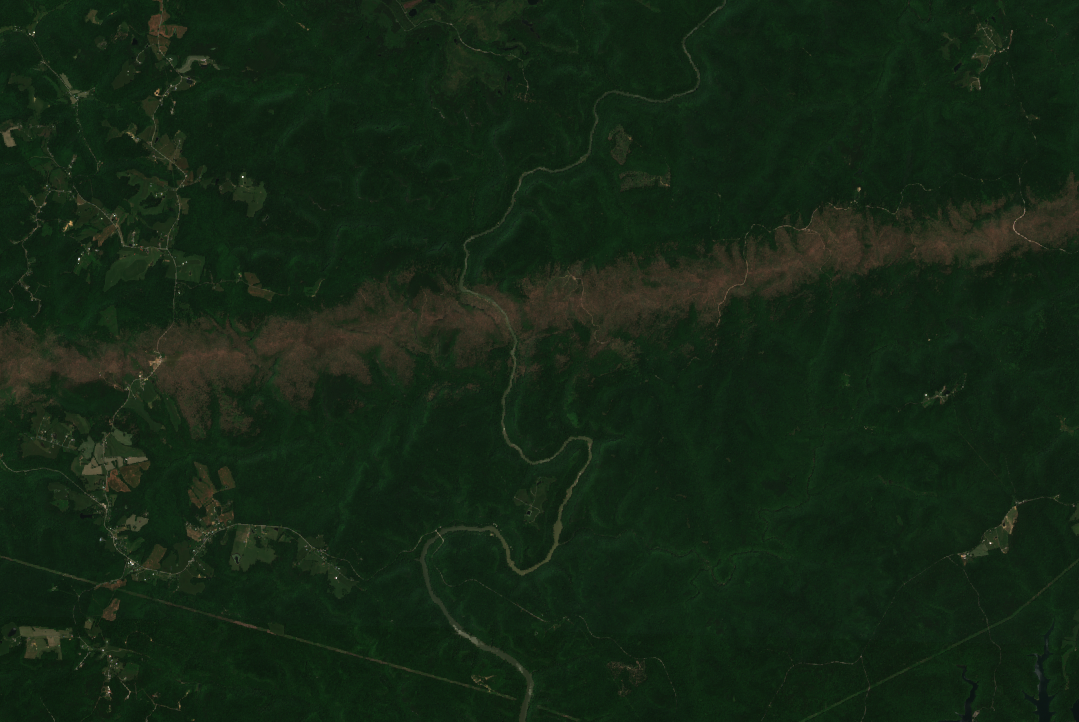
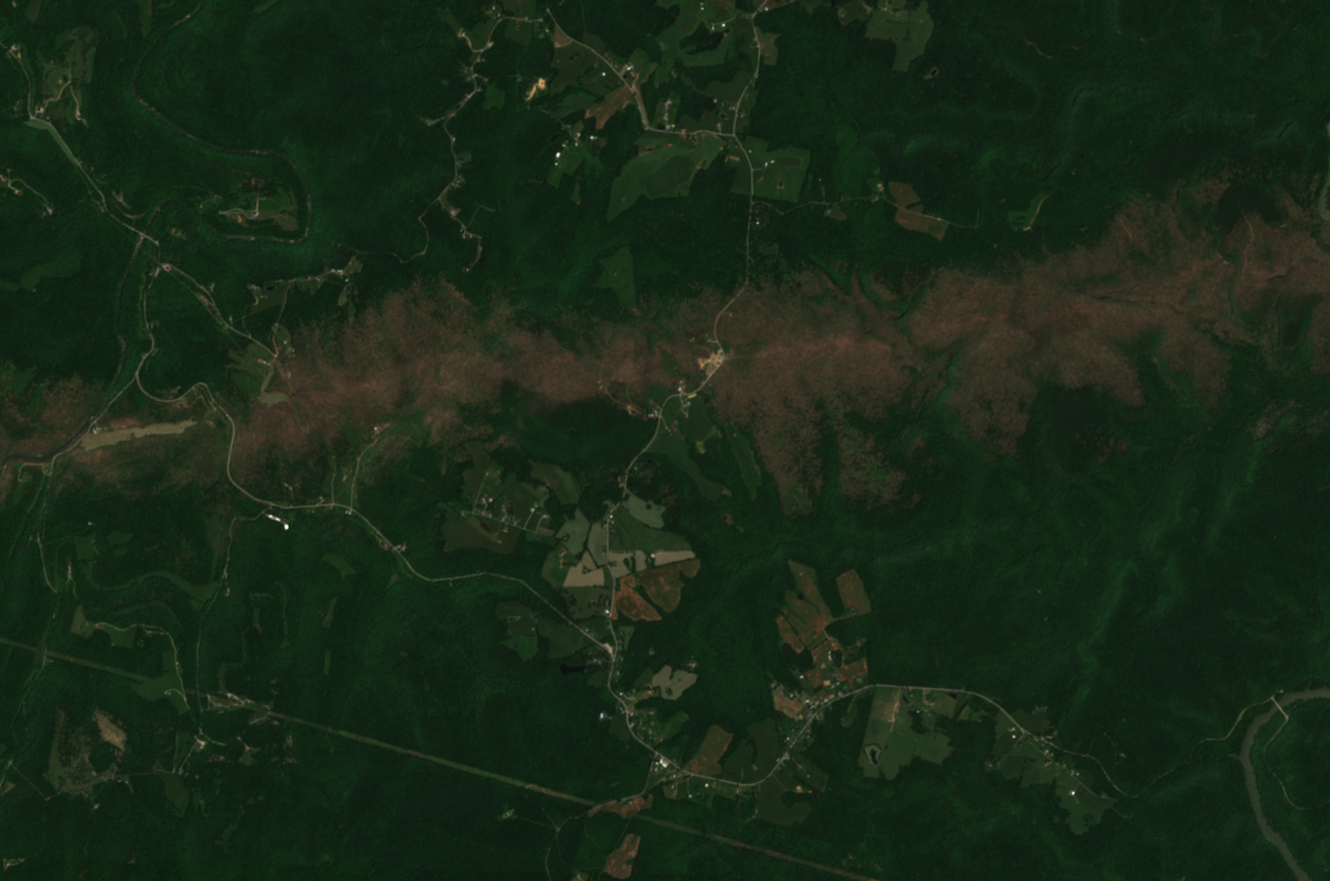
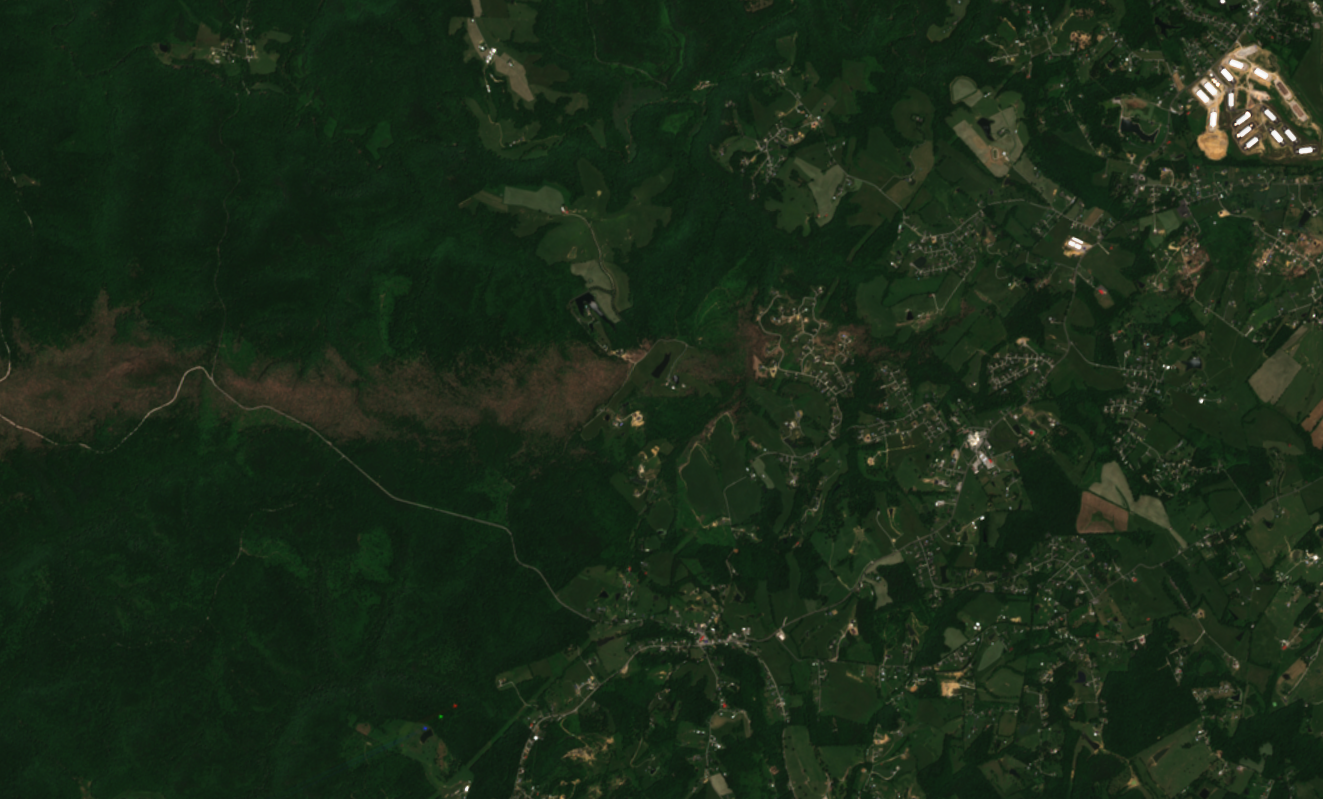
Sentinel-2 imagery taken on June 2 of forest scarring in the Daniel Boone National Forest

The tornado then moved into the Daniel Boone National Forest and quickly intensified to EF3 strength, splintering and debarking swaths of trees as it grew in size. North of the community of Poplarville along KY 3269, the tornado intensified to low-end EF4 intensity for the first time. A one-story concrete foundation home was leveled. Three people were taking shelter, an elderly couple and a friend. Two survived, but the wife, a 69-year-old woman, was killed by flying debris and was later found in the yard of the home. Several nearby outbuildings on the property were obliterated and swept away, a car was heavily damaged, and several trees behind the property were extensively debarked and stubbed.

The tornado then weakened as it continued eastward and crossed KY 192 at EF2 intensity. Another area of intense tree damage occurred east of KY 192, with the tornado regaining EF3 intensity. This included extreme tree damage with only stubs and heavily debarked softwood trees left behind. Surveyors assessed the wind speeds to be at 153 mph (246 km/h), which is the highest wind speed rating for damage to softwood trees, but noted that the tornado was likely at EF4 intensity here. After briefly weakening to EF2 intensity, the tornado regained EF3 intensity as it approached KY 1003 while continuing to grow in size. Entire swaths of softwood trees were mowed down, debarked, and stubbed with surveyors again noting that the tornado may have reached EF4 intensity multiple times along this segment of the path. The tornado reached its maximum width of just under a mile as it crossed KY 1003, where several homes were heavily damaged or destroyed, including some that had some or all of their exterior walls knocked down, two mobile homes and outbuildings were blown away, vehicles were damaged, and power poles were damaged.

The tornado then crossed into Laurel County, continuing to mow down swaths of trees. After crossing the county line, it began to shrink in size and weaken slowly as it continued eastward, dropping to EF2 intensity along W Line Creek Road. The tornado then began impacting large residential areas southwest of London, first impacting the Laurel Canyon subdivision at high-end EF2 intensity. Multiple homes had their roofs completely removed and exterior walls knocked down, while other homes suffered minor to moderate roof damage. Wooden power poles were snapped, and several trees and power poles were snapped or uprooted as well. The tornado then shrank some more and weakened further to EF1 intensity, damaging or destroying outbuildings and snapping or uprooting trees. It then exited the forest and crossed KY 192 again, removing most of the roof off a home.

=== Southern London and rapid dissipation ===
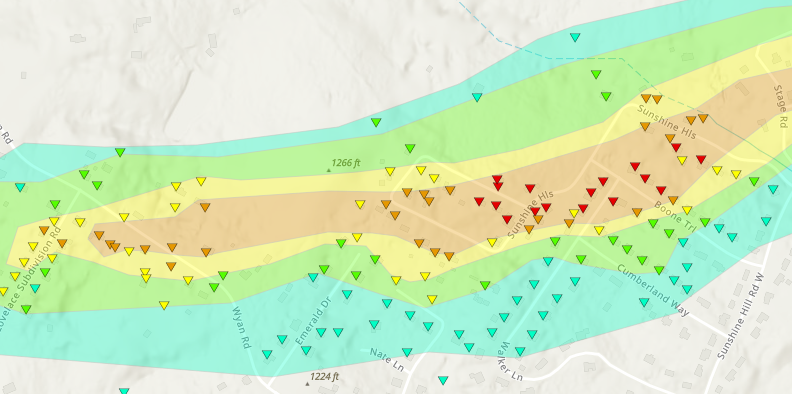
Path of the Somerset-London tornado tearing through the Sunshine Hills subdivision. Key EF0 65–85 mph EF1 86–110 mph EF2 111–135 mph EF3 136–165 mph EF4 166–200 mph

The tornado strengthened to high-end EF2 intensity along Hart Church Road. Extensive tree damage occurred, with several trees snapped, and multiple homes experienced significant roof damage, including one that had most of its walls leveled. A 47-year-old woman was killed along this road when her home suffered major damage. The tornado then briefly lifted above the tree line as it descended another hill before touching back down at the bottom of the hill. The tornado intensified further to high-end EF3 intensity as it impacted the Lovelace Subdivision and Wyan Road. Three homes were swept away, including an unanchored, elevated two-story vinyl home that was thrown across Wyan Road, with several other homes receiving significant damage, including some that were leveled or had only interior walls left standing. Other homes nearby had severe roof damage, outbuildings were destroyed, vehicles were damaged, including a tractor-trailer that was turned to its side, and trees and power poles were snapped. An elderly couple was killed in one of the homes. The tornado maintained high-end EF3 intensity, impacting the south and southeastern parts of the Sunshine Hills subdivision. Three homes were completely leveled or swept away. One of them had a concrete slab that was lifted and cracked, as the small room on the slab was ripped away. However, poor construction quality prevented a higher rating. Several mobile homes were also obliterated, and many outbuildings were swept away. The tornado then became violent once again with winds of 170 mph (270 km/h). The Sunshine Hills Baptist Church was completely swept off its foundation, leaving sections of the basement intact. Two well-built brick veneer homes beside the church were mostly destroyed, leaving a few interior walls standing. To the east of the church, across the street, another row of homes was destroyed. Trees in this area were violently debarked and denuded, with one of them having twisted metal wrapped around it.

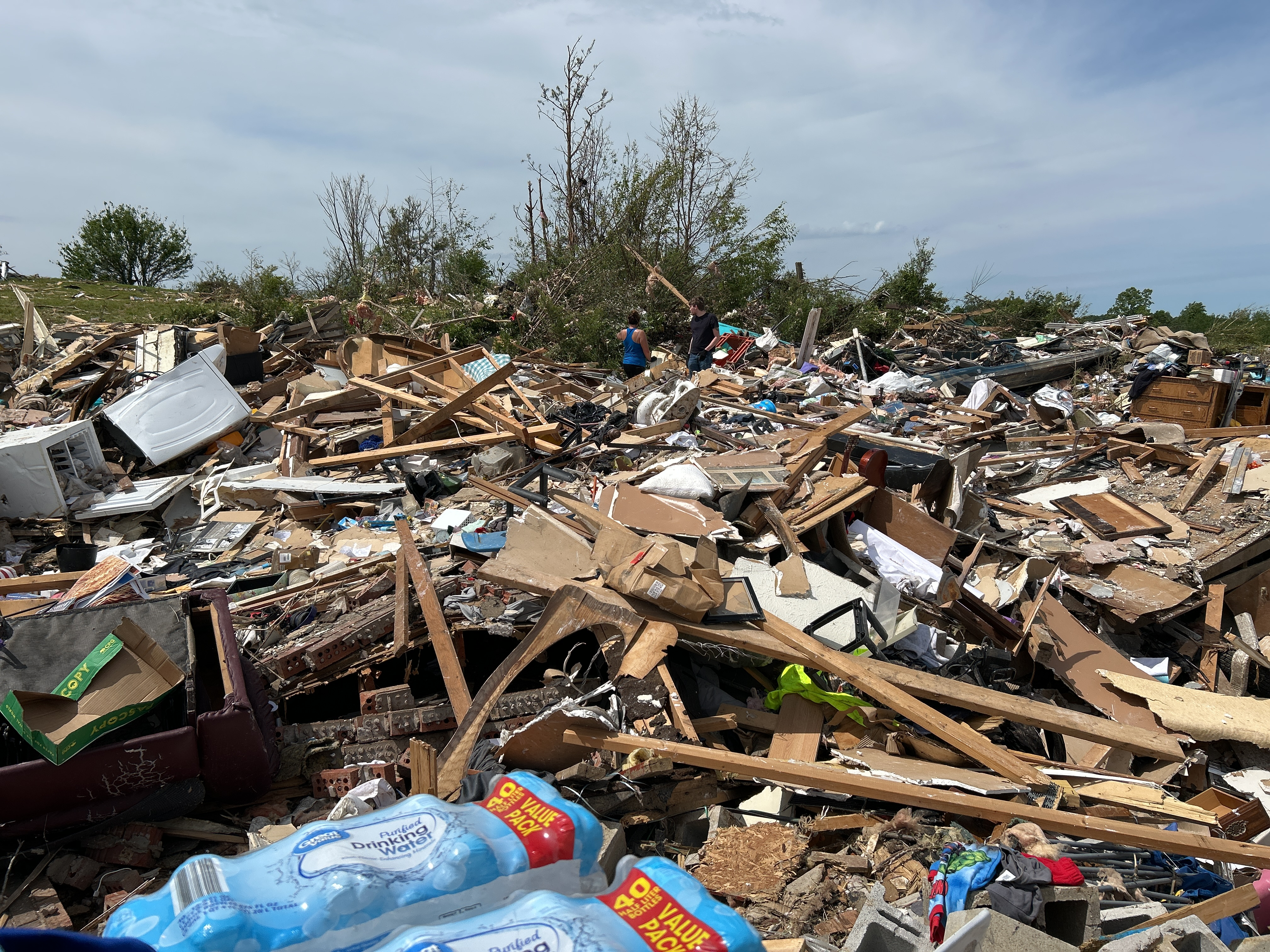
EF4 damage in the Sunshine Hills subdivision of London

The tornado crossed over Walker Lane, demolishing a row of three homes at low-end EF4 intensity. The tornado crossed Boone Trail, leveling and sweeping away several more homes off their foundations, a 68-year-old elderly woman was killed in her home along Boone Trail. The tornado continued onto Sunshine Hills Road, sweeping away one home and heavily damaging others, a concrete porch from the swept home was shifted 10–20 ft (3.0–6.1 m) and was cracked in half, the family in the swept home survived with minor injuries. Two homes were mostly leveled, leaving a few interior walls standing, with a man being killed in one of the homes. Another one-story brick home was completely flattened, and several softwood and hardwood trees were heavily debarked and stubbed. The tornado weakened slightly to high-end EF3 intensity, impacting the Saddlebrook Garden Homes. A couple of poorly constructed homes were leveled and swept away at estimated windspeeds up to 160 mph (260 km/h). Several other homes were mostly leveled, with a few interior walls standing, and many softwood trees were extensively debarked, a 67-year-old retired woman was killed in one of the homes along Saddle Road. Most of the casualties from this tornado occurred in the Sunshine Hills subdivision, with at least nine fatalities occurring in the subdivision alone.

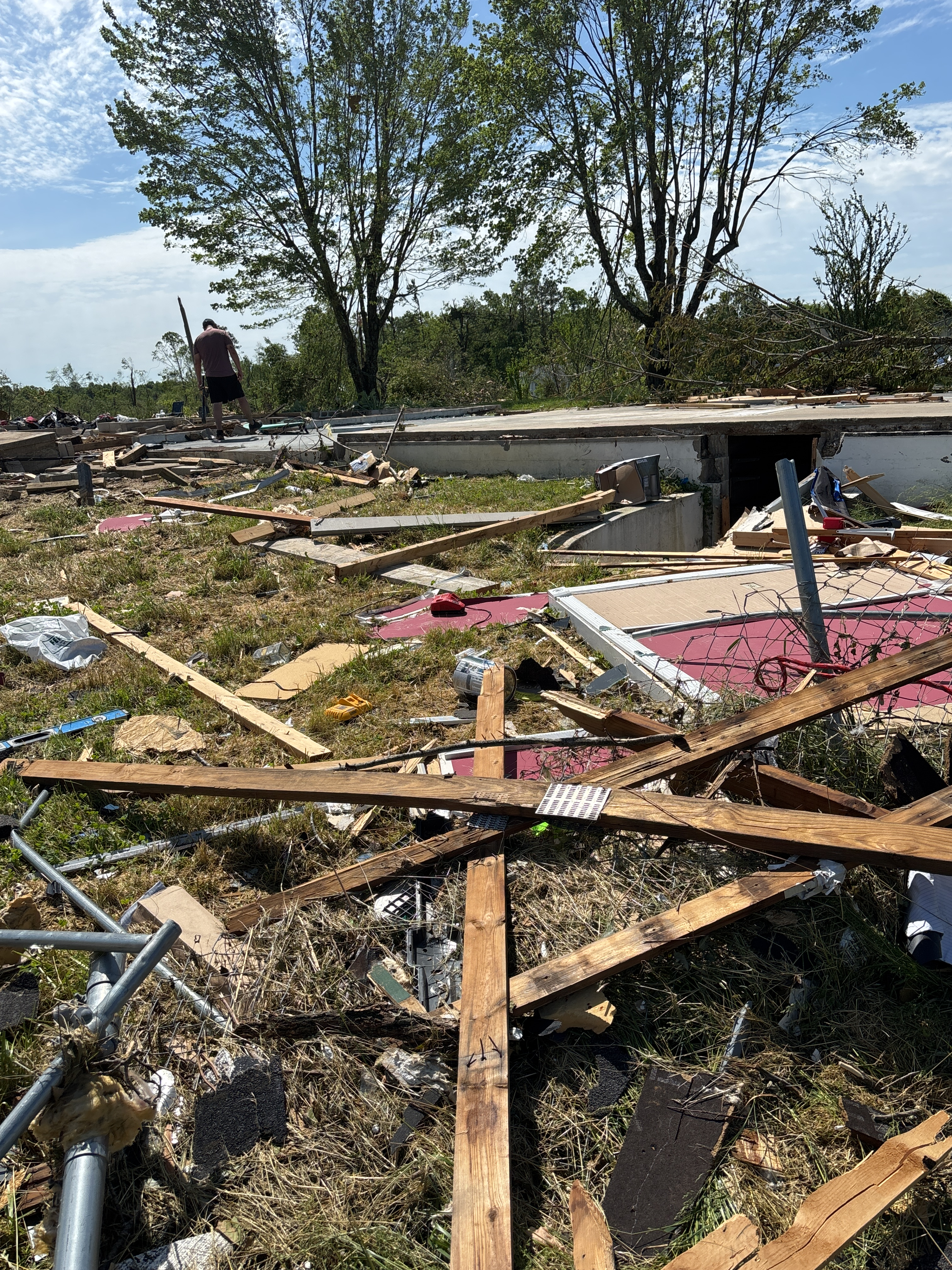
EF3 damage to a home east of Interstate 75 in London

The tornado then crossed KY 363 and I-75 and weakened to mid-range EF3 intensity as it impacted a neighborhood and mobile home park along Philpot Road. A poorly built home was swept away, and several mobile homes were destroyed. Multiple homes sustained moderate to significant roof damage, two one-story houses had their exterior walls collapse, a garage was destroyed, and several trees were snapped. The tornado weakened further to mid-range EF2 intensity, impacting another neighborhood along Hawkins Road and McGill Pine Grove Road. Multiple homes sustained significant roof damage, and several broken glass windows, and trees were snapped or uprooted. The tornado continued northeast and impacted another subdivision along KY 1006. Another poorly built home along Airview Drive, another home along the road was mostly leveled, with a few interior walls left standing. Multiple outbuildings and garages were destroyed, a couple of homes sustained minor to severe roof damage, a mobile home was obliterated, trees were severely debarked and denuded, and another poorly built home was leveled at mid-range EF3 intensity. Two elderly siblings were killed in this subdivision as their home was destroyed here.

CCTV footage of the tornado moving near the London-Corbin airport at high-end EF3 intensity.

The tornado continued eastward, crossing over the runway of the London-Corbin Airport before impacting the Meadowlane Subdivision near the airport. Initially impacting at low-end EF3 intensity, two mobile homes along Court Road were demolished, a home had large sections of its roof ripped away, and several other homes sustained moderate roof damage. The tornado intensified slightly along Oak Road. A couple of homes were destroyed, with interior walls left standing, and a couple more had their exterior walls collapse, an unanchored home was shifted off its foundation, and several homes along Meadowlane Road had extensive roof damage, and some of their walls collapsed. The tornado intensified further along the road, two homes were mostly leveled, with interior walls left standing at estimated windspeeds up to 150 mph (240 km/h). Around the same time, a security camera from across the runway captured the tornado tearing through the subdivision at 11:47 p.m. EDT. The tornado crossed Miller Lane, leveling another poorly constructed home at the same intensity, a detached garage was leveled on the property. The tornado slightly intensified to estimated winds of 155 mph (249 km/h) along Miller Lane cul-de-sac. Three rows of homes were leveled, but the poor construction quality negated a higher rating. A few other homes were left with their interior walls intact, trees were severely debarked, and another home with subpar construction was leveled.

The tornado maintained EF3 intensity, impacting several warehouses and hangars south of the main airport building. Several hangars and metal building systems were significantly damaged, with a couple of them destroyed. A couple of aircraft, including six Beechcraft T-34 Mentors and a medical helicopter, were thrown and destroyed. The tornado reached high-end EF3 intensity, impacting a large metal building along Airport Drive. The entire structure was completely destroyed, with debris swept clean from the foundation, and the I-beams were torn loose from their anchoring. The Soelberg Industries manufacturing center was leveled by the tornado. The Maximus Industrial building along KY 1006 was heavily damaged by the tornado, inflicting severe damage to its exterior walls and parts of the interior walls. A family of three was taking shelter inside the building, and their 25-year-old son was killed by the tornado as the building collapsed. Near the building, a small neighborhood was impacted; two one-story brick homes had parts of its exterior walls collapsed, several homes were unroofed, a mobile home was badly damaged, and a large tree was uprooted.

The tornado then crossed US 25, strengthening slightly to low-end EF3 intensity as it impacted a small business sector along the highway. The Triple Threat Martial Arts school and a large apartment building along this highway was completely destroyed, resulting in two fatalities inside the apartment. The Southside Florist shop were flattened, with estimated windspeeds up to 140 mph (230 km/h). Adventure Pets pet store was heavily damaged, none of the pets inside were killed, but three exotic birds worth thousands of dollars were missing and considered stolen. The C & R Auto Repair shop was flattened and a strip mall suffered heavy exterior walls damage. Afterwards, the tornado crossed the CSX CC Subdivision and impacted a two-story home along Levi Jackson Mill Road, inflicting major damage to the structure. A small cabin nearby was unroofed and several trees were snapped or uprooted and an outbuilding was destroyed. The Loughran's Olympic Boxing & Martial Arts building was significantly damaged, with parts of the structure being ripped away.

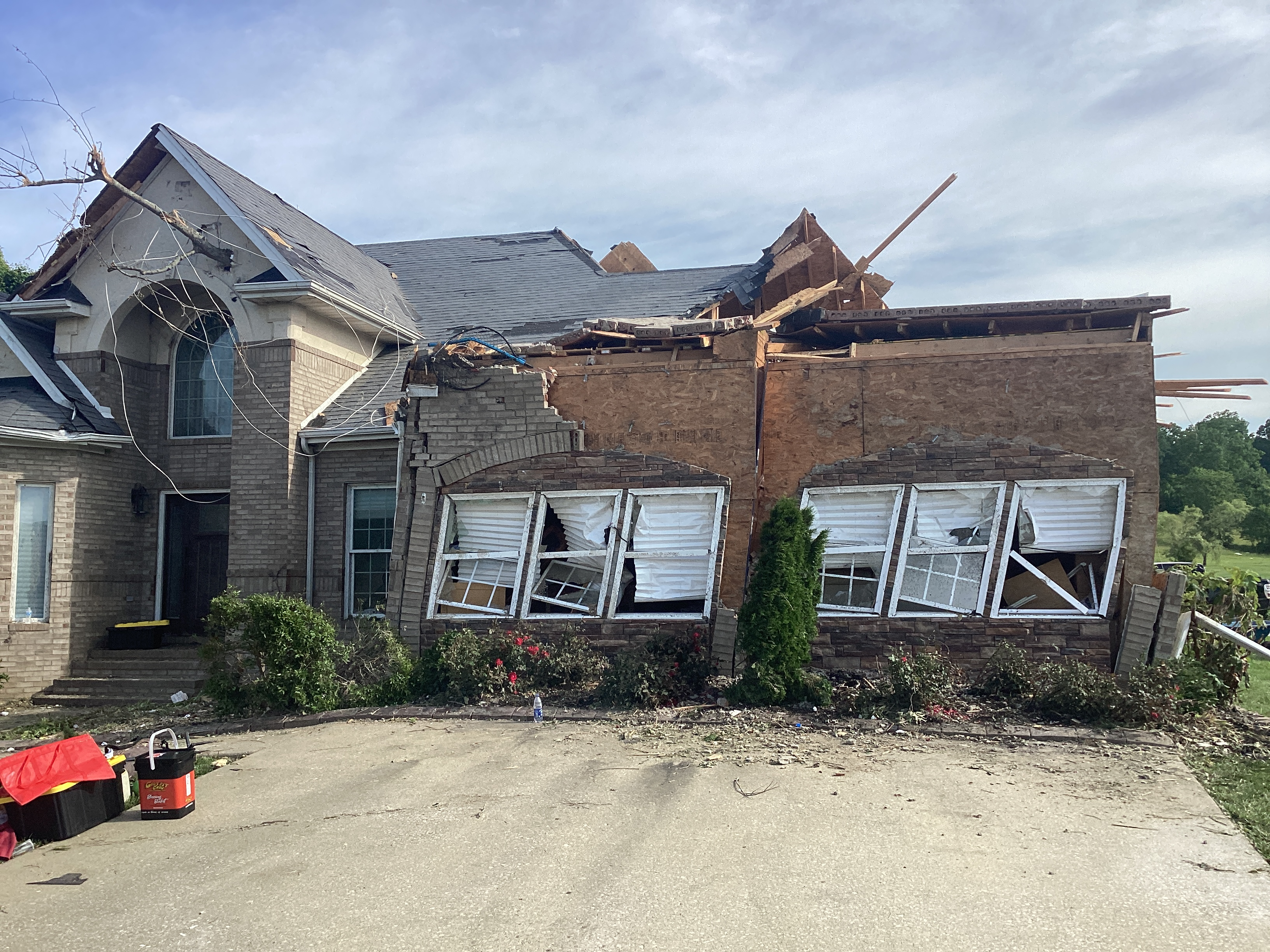
EF2 damage to a house east of London

The tornado then went through the forested areas of the Levi Jackson Wilderness Road Park, crossing KY 229 and impacting the Laurel County Fairgrounds, destroying a couple of warehouses, snapping trees and power poles, and uprooting trees. The Slate Hill Baptist Church was unroofed at EF2 intensity The tornado intensified slightly to high-end EF2 strength for the final time, impacting the Crooked Creek Golf Club neighborhood. A home along the intersection of Crooked Creek Road and Cedar Ridge Drive was heavily damaged. Another home along Cedar Ridge Drive was also heavily damaged, leaving a few interior walls standing with estimated windspeed up to 135 mph (217 km/h). Two other homes sustained significant roof damage. After impacting the first couple of homes along Cedar Ridge, the tornado abruptly weakened significantly, mainly shattering windows, snapping or uprooting trees, and causing light roof damage at EF1 strength. After exiting the neighborhood, the tornado continued eastward, causing EF0-EF1 damage to trees before weakening further to EF0 strength after crossing Farris Road. From there, the tornado crossed KY 521, KY 830, KY 80, and KY 488, mainly causing minor tree damage, with a home along KY 830 also suffering minor damage. The tornado then dissipated west of Lida just after crossing KY 488 at 11:56 pm EDT.

The tornado was on the ground for 90 minutes, tracked 60.08 mi (96.69 km), and reached a peak width of 1,700 yd (1,600 m). Laurel County declared a mass casualty incident. In all, 19 people were killed, including 18 in London, and one person in rural Pulaski and Russell County; at least 108 others were injured as reported from the CHI St. Joseph Hospital in London. The tornado was preliminary rated EF3 before being upgraded to EF4 several days later.

== Aftermath ==
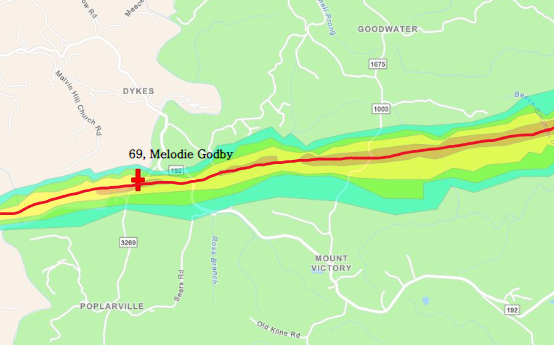
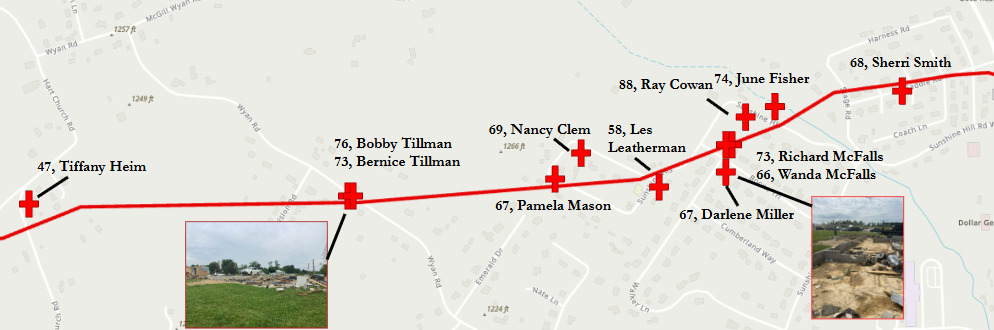
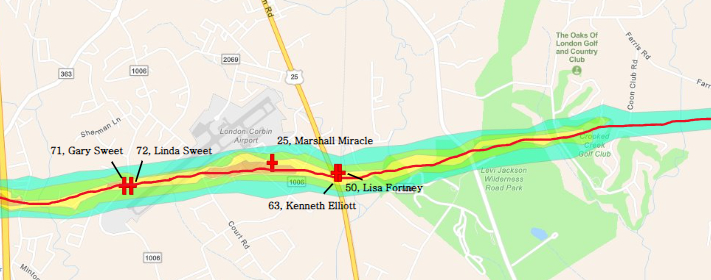
Fatality maps of the tornado throughout its 60.08-mile (96.65 km) path

=== Casualties ===
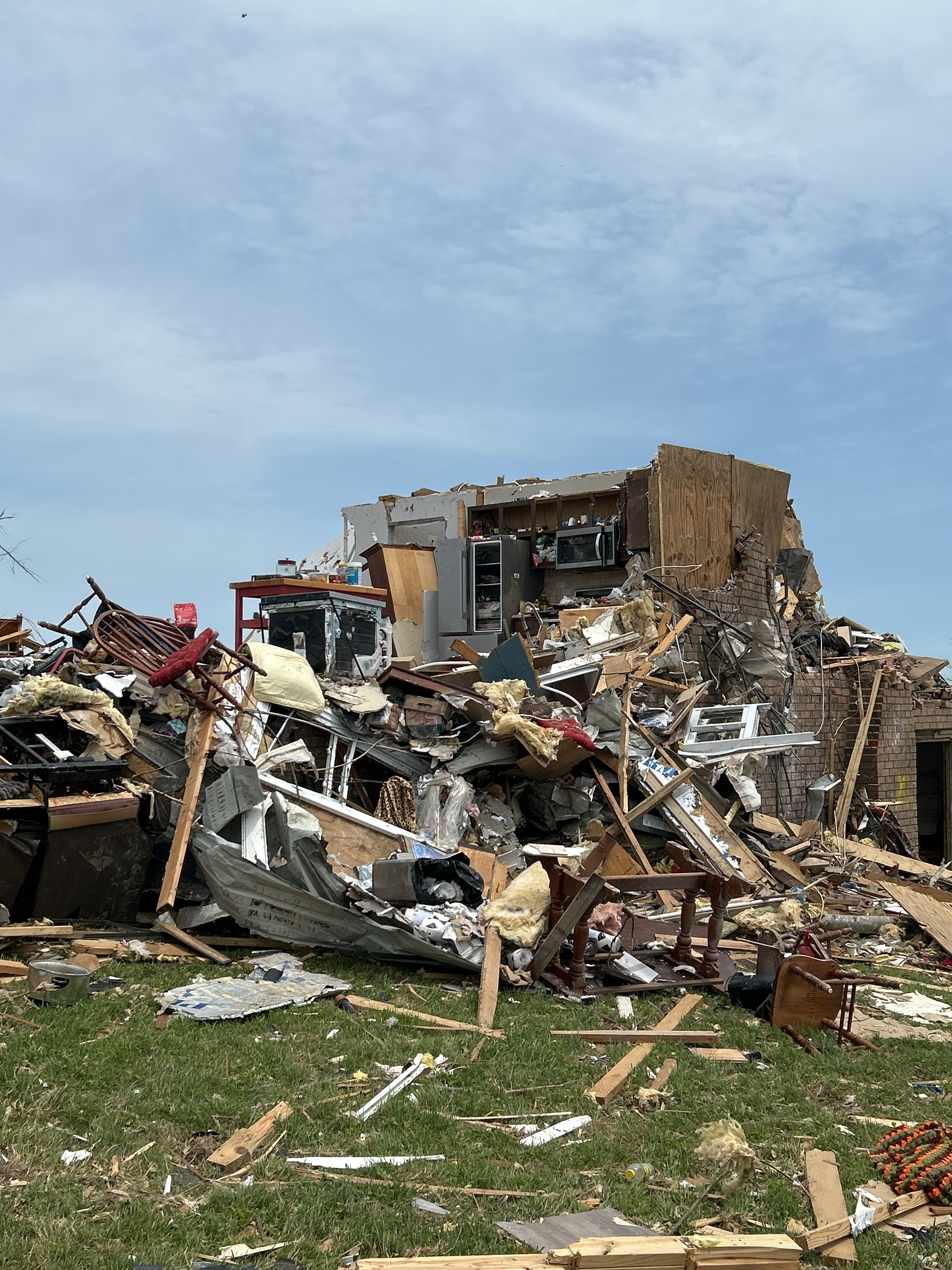
EF4 damage to a home in London where a family was killed

Eighteen people were reported as killed as a direct result of the tornado. Of the eighteen killed, seventeen of the deaths occurred in London. One death occurred in rural Pulaski County, and one person was killed indirectly in Russell County from carbon monoxide poisoning as a result of a generator being used after a power outage. Another man who lived in London also died of his injuries months later on December 2, 2025, from pneumonia enhanced by paralysis injuries sustained during the tornado. The tornado was the deadliest in Eastern Kentucky on record. At least one of the deaths occurred in the Sunshine Hills subdivision, where a family with an unspecified number of members was killed. A grove of trees saved the lives of a family in the same subdivision; survey teams noted that "the only thing that likely saved this house and its occupants was the grove of trees located behind it, on the southwest side, which took the brunt of most of the debris coming from the houses upstream, while also delimbing and debarking the trees in the process". A couple, a major firefighter from the Laurel County Fire Department and his wife, were thrown 150–300 ft (46–91 m) into a field after the tornado destroyed their home; the firefighter was killed and his wife was left in critical condition.

One person in a home on the subdivision had to receive an amputation as a result of damage from the tornado, which was rated EF4 at his property. Another couple each lost an arm as they were sheltering next to each other during the tornado. A family that was sheltering in their home was thrown as their residence was swept away, but the family survived with minor injuries. News agency Fox Weather wrote that the subdivision itself looked "unrecognizable". The New York Times said that the tornado was "out of a horror movie".

Local authorities in Somerset feared that the death toll would've been high in the city if the tornado had veered into more populated subdivisions along Parker Mills Road or had touched down during daylight, where the business district would have been very active with employees and customers. In the wake of the tornado, the Saint Joseph Health Hospital in London saw an influx of patients, more than 100 people were treated in the hospital, one died, but the majority were treated and released, with eleven sent to other hospitals and four were admitted. In total, 108 patients were treated for injuries, ranging from cuts to punctured lungs and bruises. The age range of the patients treated were from one-year-old to elderly individuals. At least ten others were injured by the tornado; eight people remained in hospitals according to a WLEX-TV publication on May 17.

List of tornado victims
Name	Age	Location
Lisa Fortney	50	London
Leslie Leatherman	58	London
Tiffany Heim	47	London
Pamela Mason	57	London
Marshall Miracle	25	London
June Fisher	74	London
Darlene Miller	67	London
Richard McFall	73	London
Wanda McFall	65	London
Kenneth Elliott	63	London
Bobby Tillman	76	London
Bernice Tillman	73	London
Ray Cowan	88	London
Linda Sweet	72	London
Gary Sweet	71	London
Nancy Clem	69	London
Sherri Smith	68	London
David Krell (Note: The death is officially ruled as double pneumonia.)	46	London
Debra Edelman (Note: The death is officially ruled as carbon monoxide poisoning.)	93	Lake Cumberland
Melodie Godby	69	Rural Pulaski County

=== Damage ===
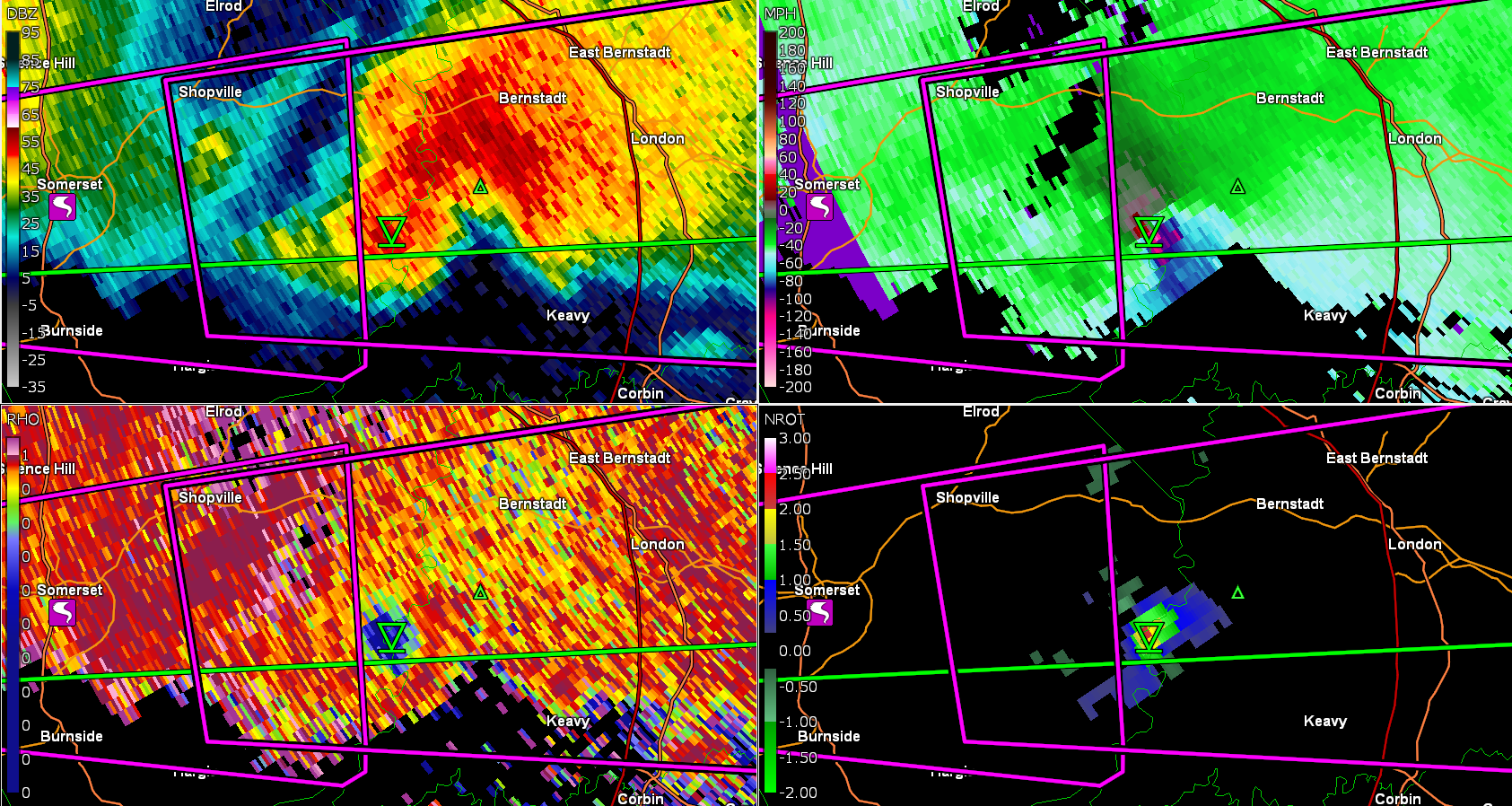
Radar imagery of the tornado east of Somerset, approaching London

The tornado damaged or destroyed 1,500 homes and caused $350 million (2025 USD) in damage in Laurel County alone. The tornado received a rating of EF4 on the Enhanced Fujita scale following a damage survey, classifying the tornado as violent based on the damage it caused. Meteorologist Chuck Grier at the NWS office in Jackson said that "to get one of those in our area is quite rare and quite an impressive coming together of atmospheric conditions", referring to the tornado. According to the damage survey, EF4 damage was inflicted between two different areas along the tornado's 59.9 mi (96.4 km) track. The first portion of EF4 damage occurred in the Daniel Boone National Forest east of Somerset, where a farmhouse was completely destroyed and trees were debarked and denuded. The United States Forest Service advised visitors to avoid areas in advance of windfall.

The second occurred within London city limits; seventeen homes in the Sunshine Hills subdivision west of the London-Corbin Airport sustained EF4-rated damage. In addition, almost consistent EF3-rated damage was inflicted by the tornado as it moved through the Daniel Boone National Forest. Thousands of trees were leveled by the tornado, traveling 47 miles (76 km) through the forest, where it swept through almost 30,000 acres of trees. Although the highest rating that softwood trees in the forest could receive was mid-range EF3, damage surveyors noted that there was "complete timber devastation" in the forest and that the wind speeds were likely higher than that, including at an area near Mount Victory.

Initial state assessment estimate that more than $59 million is needed to clean up more than 1.5 million cubic yards of debris from buildings and vegetation in Somerset and London. Mayor of Somerset, Alan Keck, reported that 20 businesses in the commercial area and dozens of home were damaged or destroyed by the tornado. Aerial video taken by several drone operators and storm chasers in the days following the tornado showed extreme damage in London; aerial footage was shared widely by news agencies. Damage from the tornado was also visible on satellite imagery. As of 2025, it is one of three tornadoes to inflict EF4 rated damage within the state of Kentucky; it is also the second-deadliest EF4 tornado in Kentucky post-2007 after the 2021 Western Kentucky tornado. The tornado was the strongest ever surveyed in National Weather Service Jackson's "county warning area".

=== Recovery efforts ===
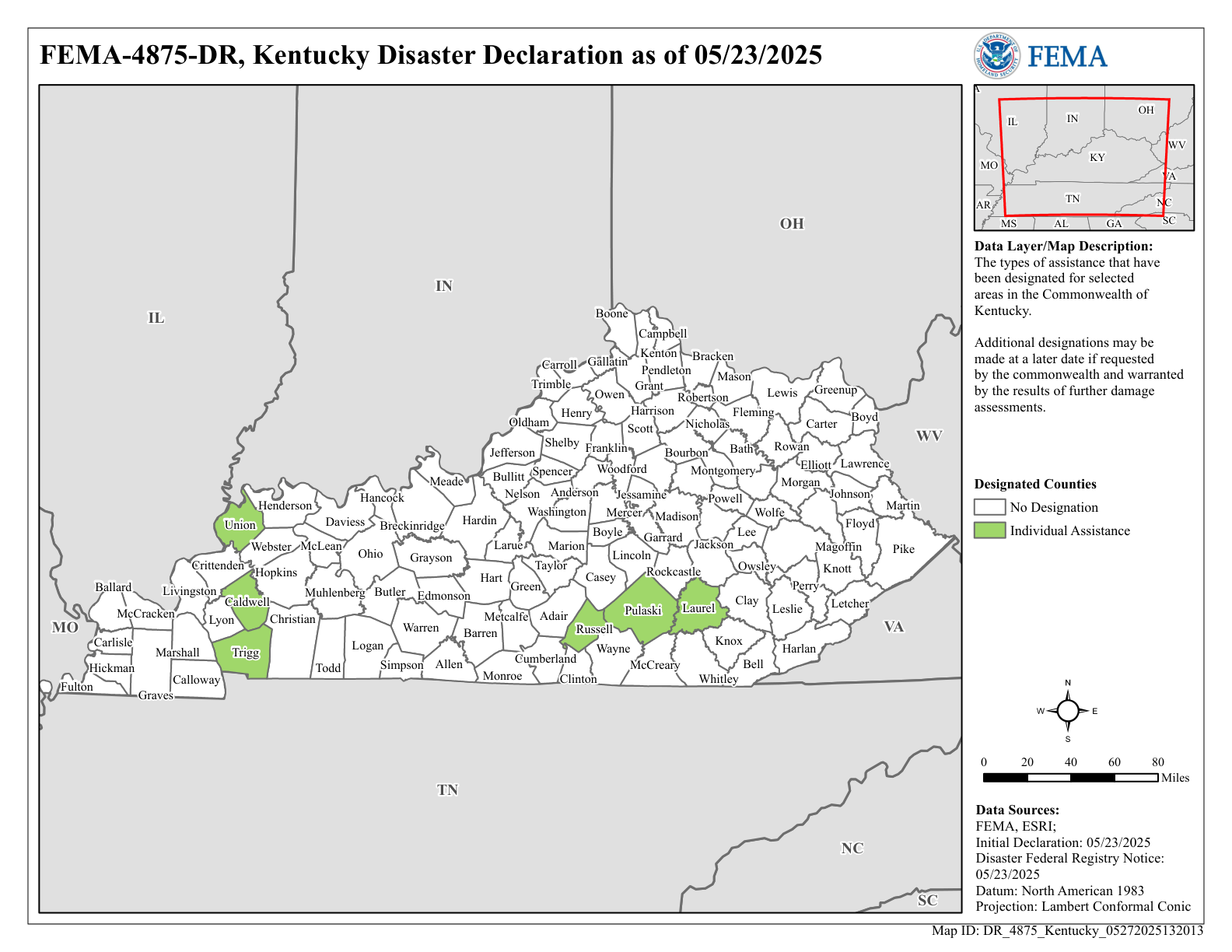
FEMA-made map of counties in Kentucky declared as disaster areas as of May 23

The Federal Emergency Management Agency (FEMA) was dispatched to London to help with immediate recovery efforts. Kentucky governor Andy Beshear praised the federal response to the tornado, stating "but they've done a good job when FEMA has come in to Kentucky, and I'm grateful". Senator Rand Paul also remarked on FEMA's operations immediately following the tornado, saying "talking with the emergency management people here, they feel like the federal government—and same in Pulaski County—the federal government is doing a pretty good job right now". Operation Barbecue Relief were mobilized in London to serve meals to survivors and first responders, expecting to serve 1,500 meals per day in Kentucky. The Team Kentucky Storm Relief Fund, established by Governor Andy Beshear, and United Way of Laurel County Long-Term Disaster Fund accepted any donations the places impacted by the tornado. The Salvation Army volunteers offered meals and emotional and spiritual care in Somerset on May 17 and in London the next day, with the volunteers serving lunch and dinner at the Creek Church in Somerset for victims and volunteers on May 19. At the Creek Church, the tornado provided 200 to 300 hot meals per day to victims impacted the tornado. Looting occurred after the tornado, with looters stealing donations at the Bill Vaughn Memorial Trailer Park in London, though more donations poured in after the looting.

FEMA announcement on May 23

Samaritan's Purse sent out two disaster relief units tractor trailers filled with supplies and equipment, unit seven set up a base of operation at the Calvary Baptist Church in London. Perry County Fiscal Court officials organized multiple drop-off locations to collect supplies to help victims of the tornado in London, residents of the county were urged to donate items, which included tarps for temporary shelter, protection and gift cards for food, and other essential supplies. Kroger donated $25,000 (2025 USD) to God's Pantry Food Bank for the communities impacted by the tornado. Kroger stores in Laurel and Pulaski counties donated 24 packs of water to the areas impacted by the tornado, with the company donating box truck of hygiene products and shelf-stable food to the Laurel County Sheriff's Office to a shelter that was set up at the Laurel County High School.

Walmart and its foundation and Sam's Club partnered with nonprofit organizations to provide resources to London, raising $750,000 to support relief efforts. The Walmart Superstore located in London offered free meals through the support of Operation BBQ relief. Meade Tractor donated $100,000 (2025 USD) to the city of London to aid in recovery efforts. Other organizations participated in relief and recovery efforts immediately following the tornado. On May 30, a town hall meeting was held in London for people affected by the tornado to ask questions about the event and discuss disaster relief in the town; FEMA and the American Red Cross were in attendance.

The same day, Governor Beshear stated that more funding was needed for recovery efforts, saying "what I'm seeing are expenses that are large enough to where I think a SAFE fund will be needed, especially for Laurel and Pulaski counties". FEMA declared six Kentucky counties a disaster area on May 23 under the identification number "DR-4875-KY", after a request for aid assistance was submitted by Beshear. The six counties included Russell, Pulaski and Laurel counties. Beshear also estimated that cleanup costs would likely total over $59 million (2025 USD) and that 1,500,000 yards (4,500,000 ft) of debris will need to be removed from areas where the tornado impacted.

=== Staffing cuts and aid controversy ===
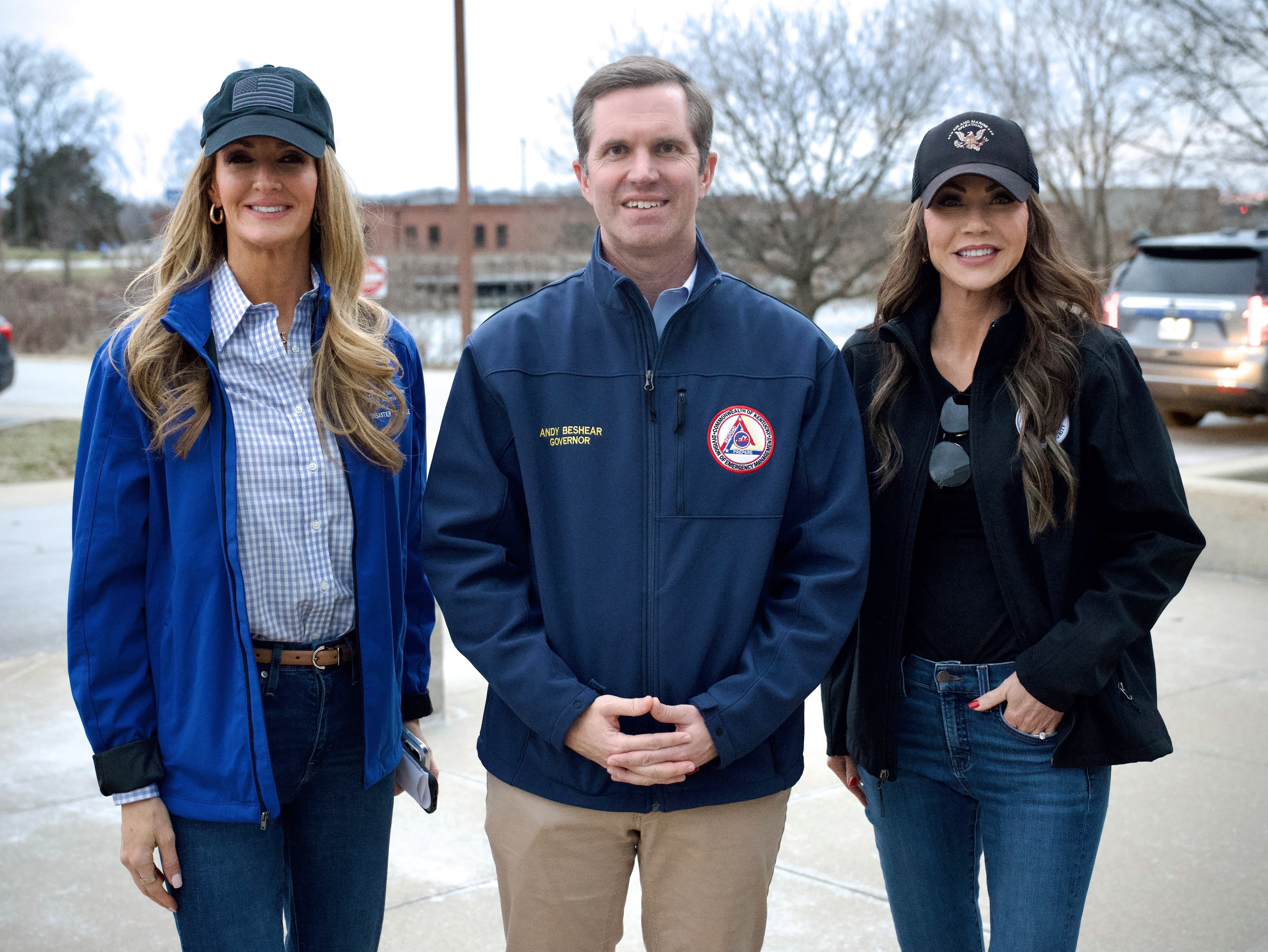
Kentucky governor Andy Beshear (center, seen in February 2025) praised the government's response to the tornado

The issuance of tornado warnings during the event, and staffing cuts as a whole at the National Weather Service in Jackson, Kentucky, were a talking point following the tornado. Due to staffing cuts caused by the Department of Government Efficiency, the three major NWS offices in Kentucky were all understaffed at the time of the tornado outbreak. Despite the cuts, the Jackson office was prepared to be fully staffed on May 16 due to the upcoming severe weather event. Christian Cassell, one of the lead meteorologists at the office, stated that "we saw the risk many days ago. We were already planning how we would staff days in advance". Fact-checking website Snopes refuted the claim that tornado warnings were not issued for Somerset and London as a result of staffing cuts.

On May 24, Governor Beshear's request for government-led aid was approved, which included grants for temporary housing and loans to cover uninsured property losses.

=== Documentation ===
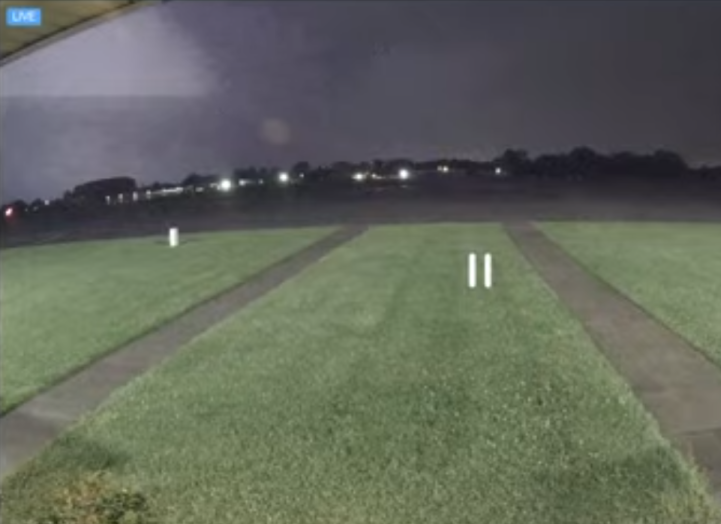
The tornado, seen on a Google Nest doorbell camera approaching London

A video taken of the tornado in Pulaski County was posted on social media, which television station WYMT-TV displayed live. In Somerset, a security camera located on a Pro Fab, Inc. building captured the tornado's winds shortly before the building was destroyed. At 11:47 pm EDT, the tornado was captured on the London-Corbin Airport's south-facing security camera. Shortly after the tornado entered the camera's viewing range, it cut power to the airport. The tornado was captured on camera as it passed over the Levi Jackson Park area south of London.

== Gallery ==
=== Somerset, Kentucky ===
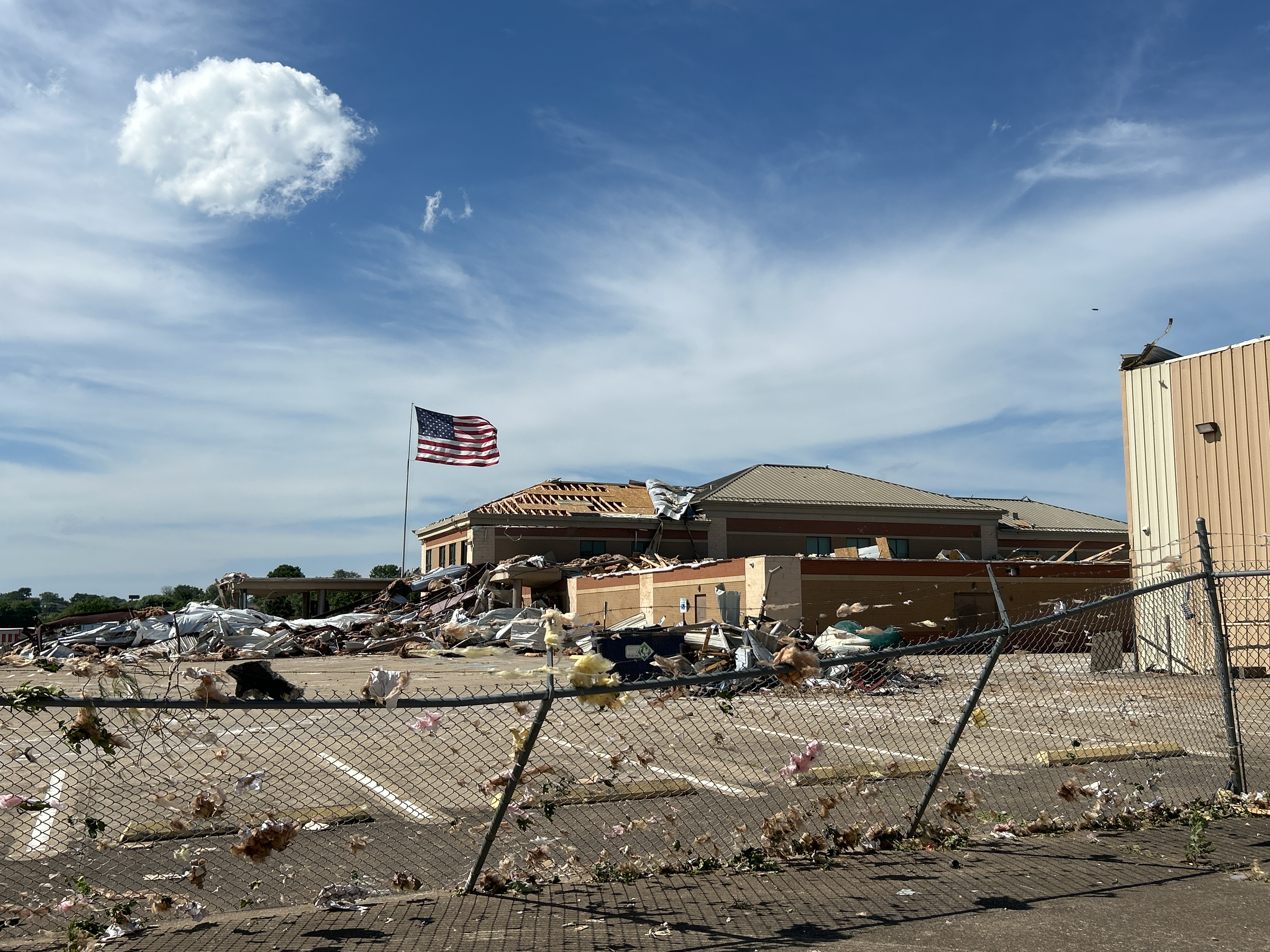
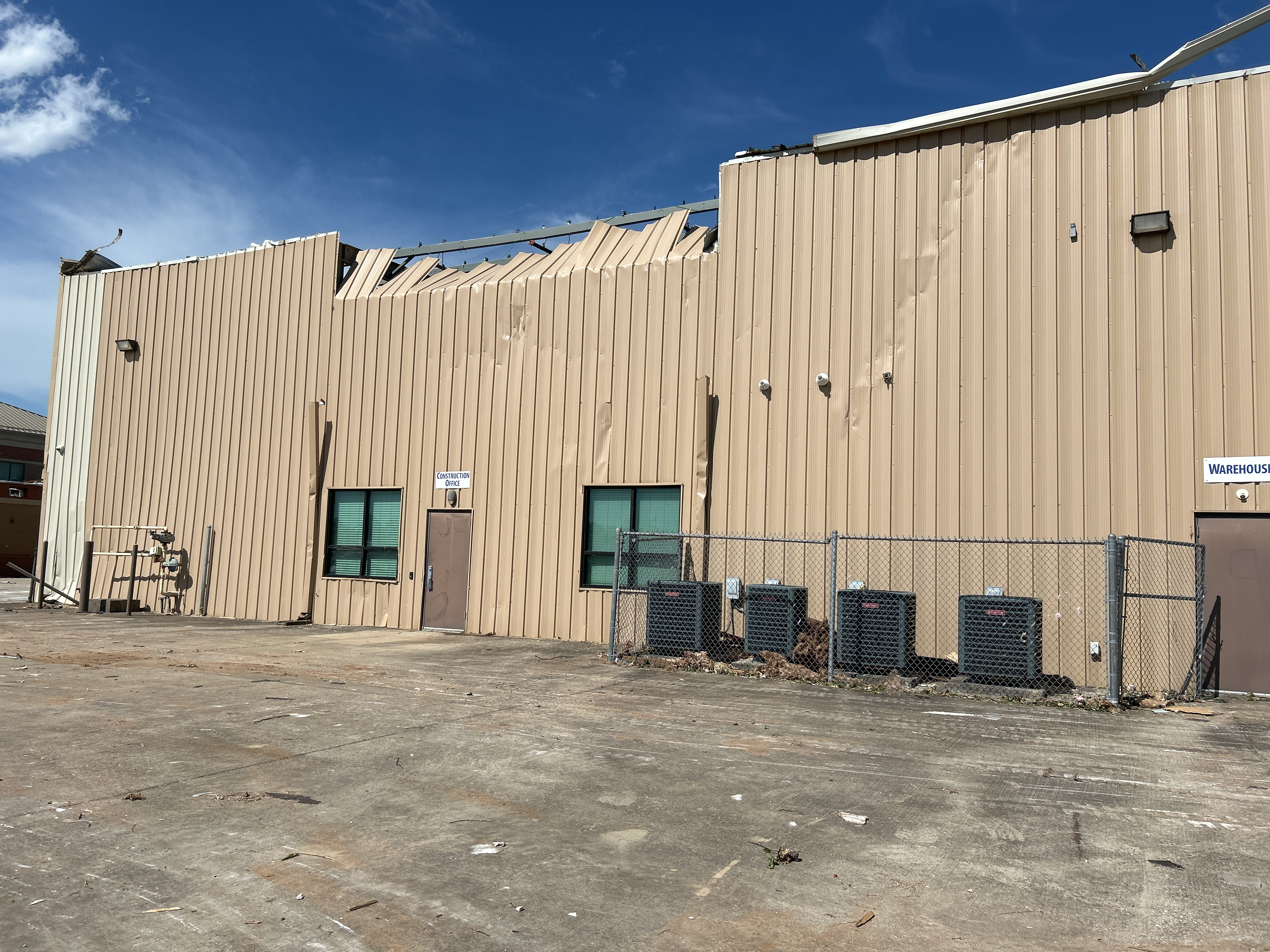
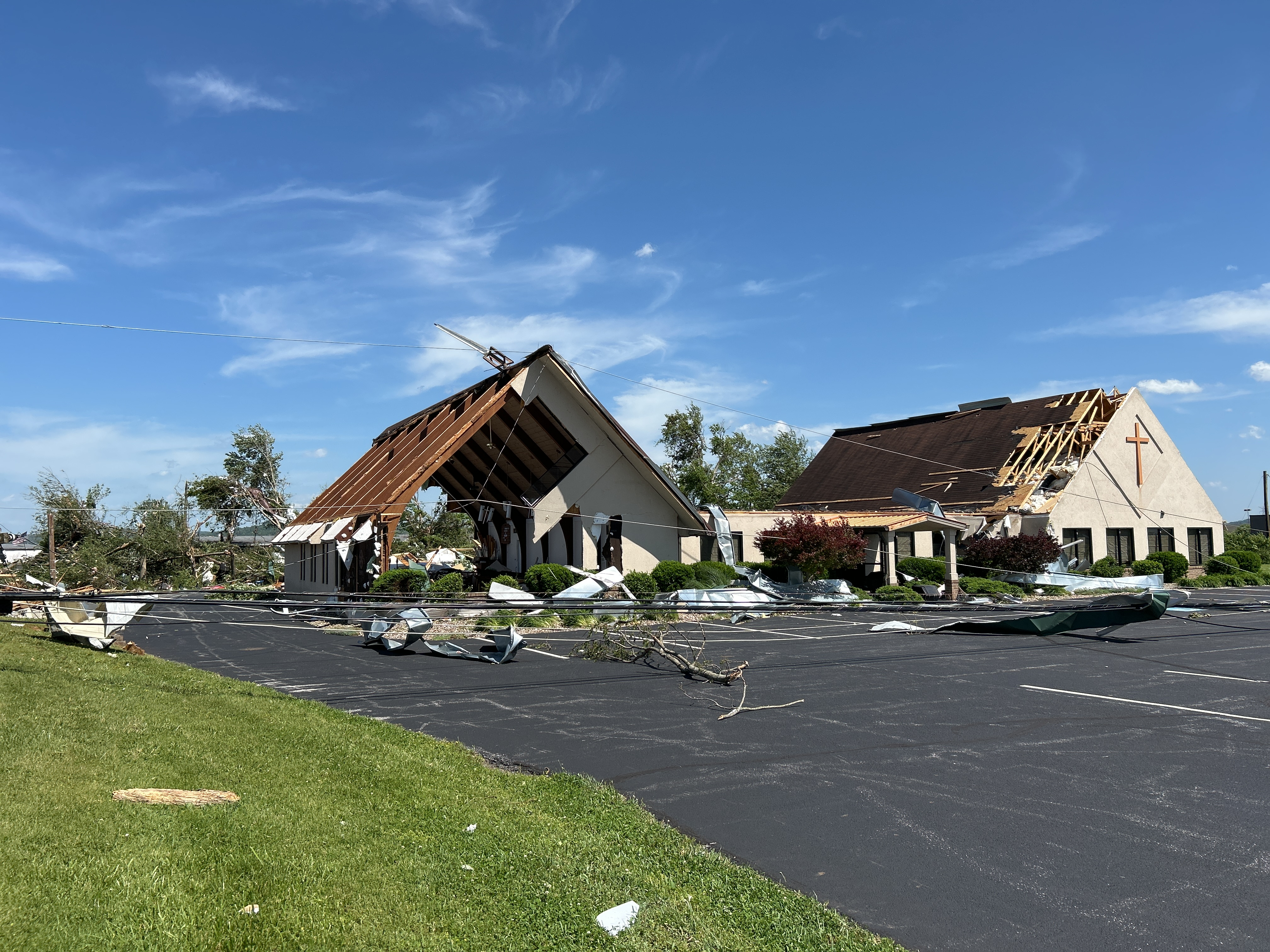
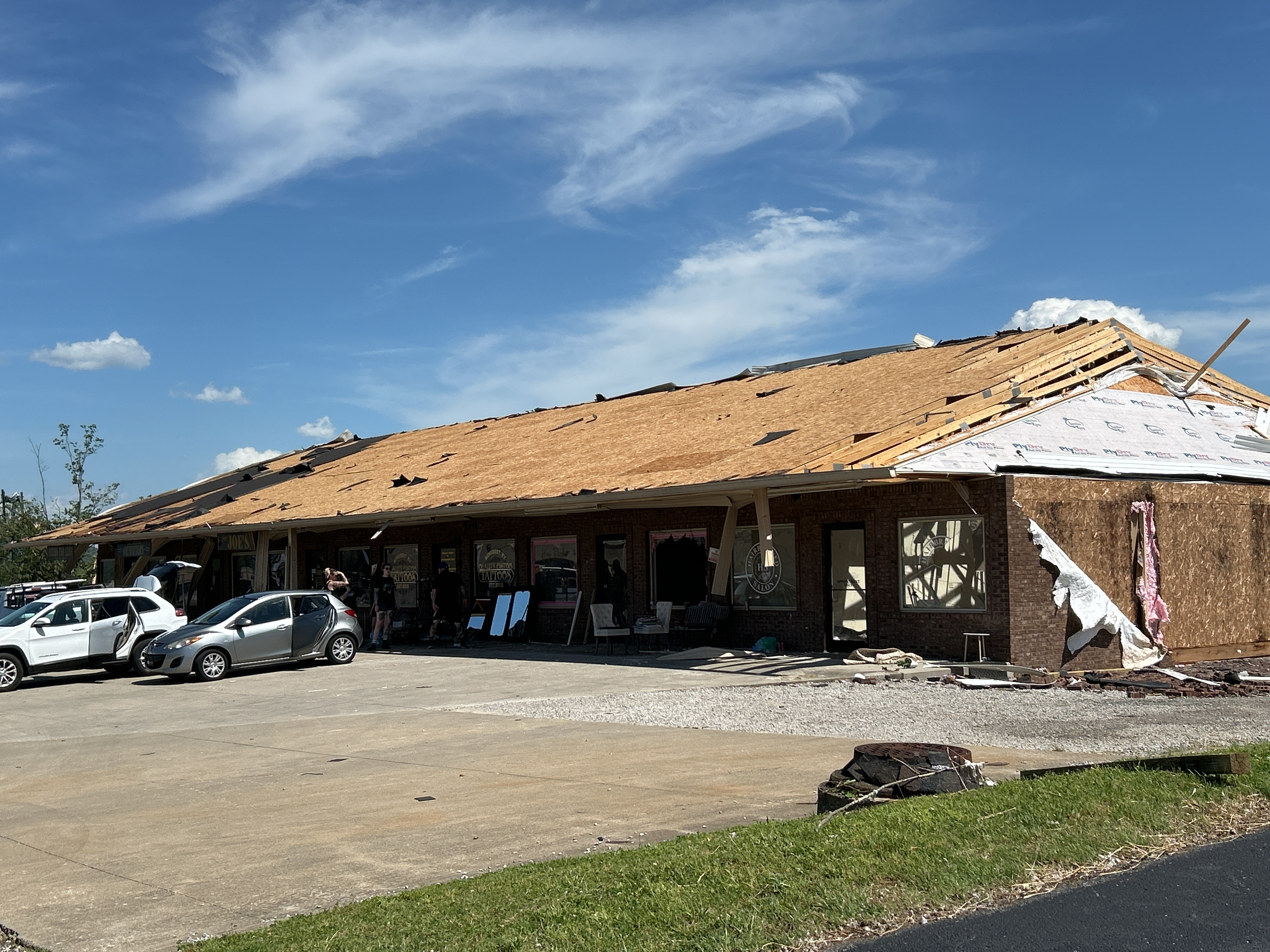
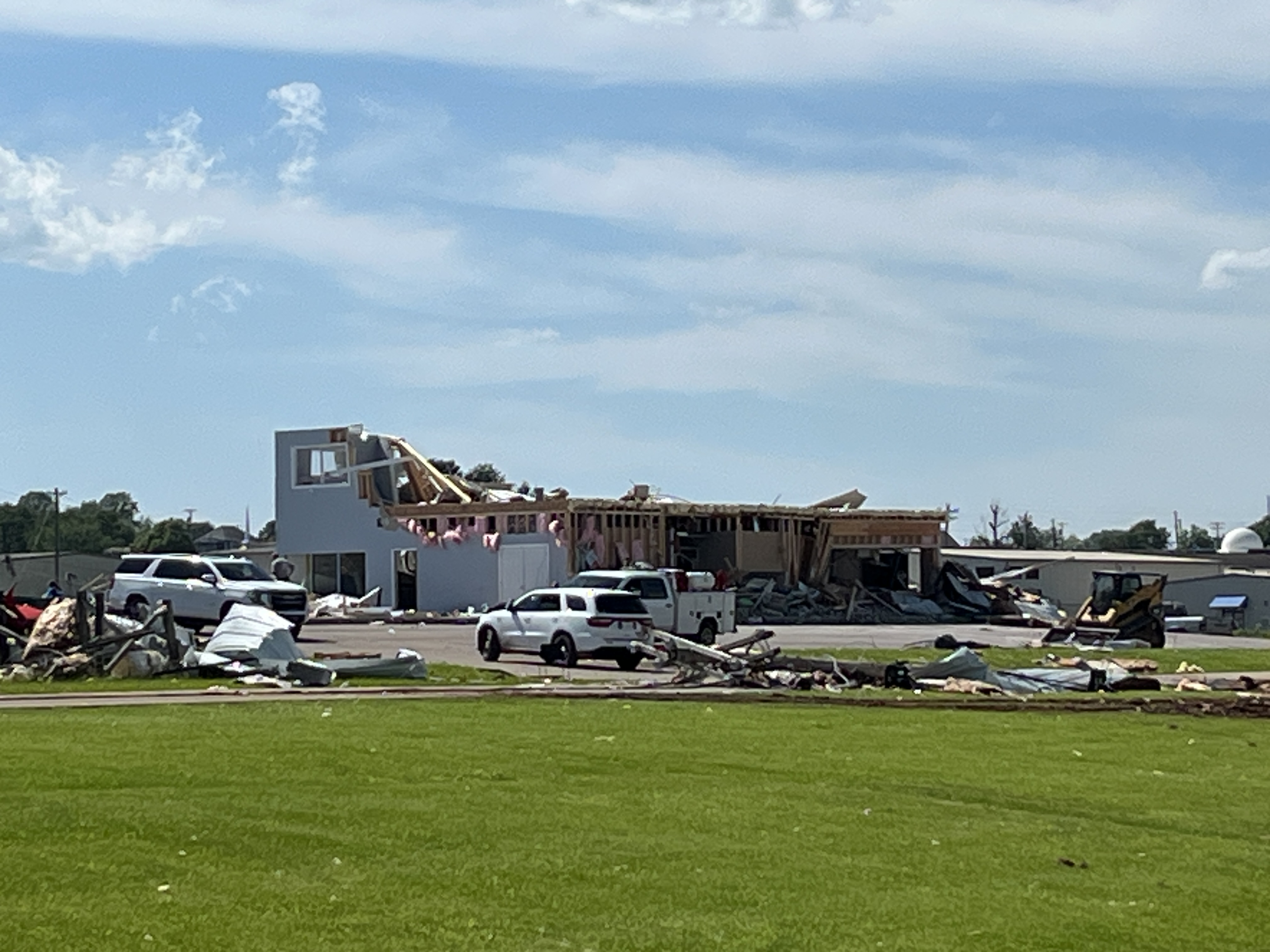
EF2 and EF3 damage in the southern portions of Somerset

=== London, Kentucky ===
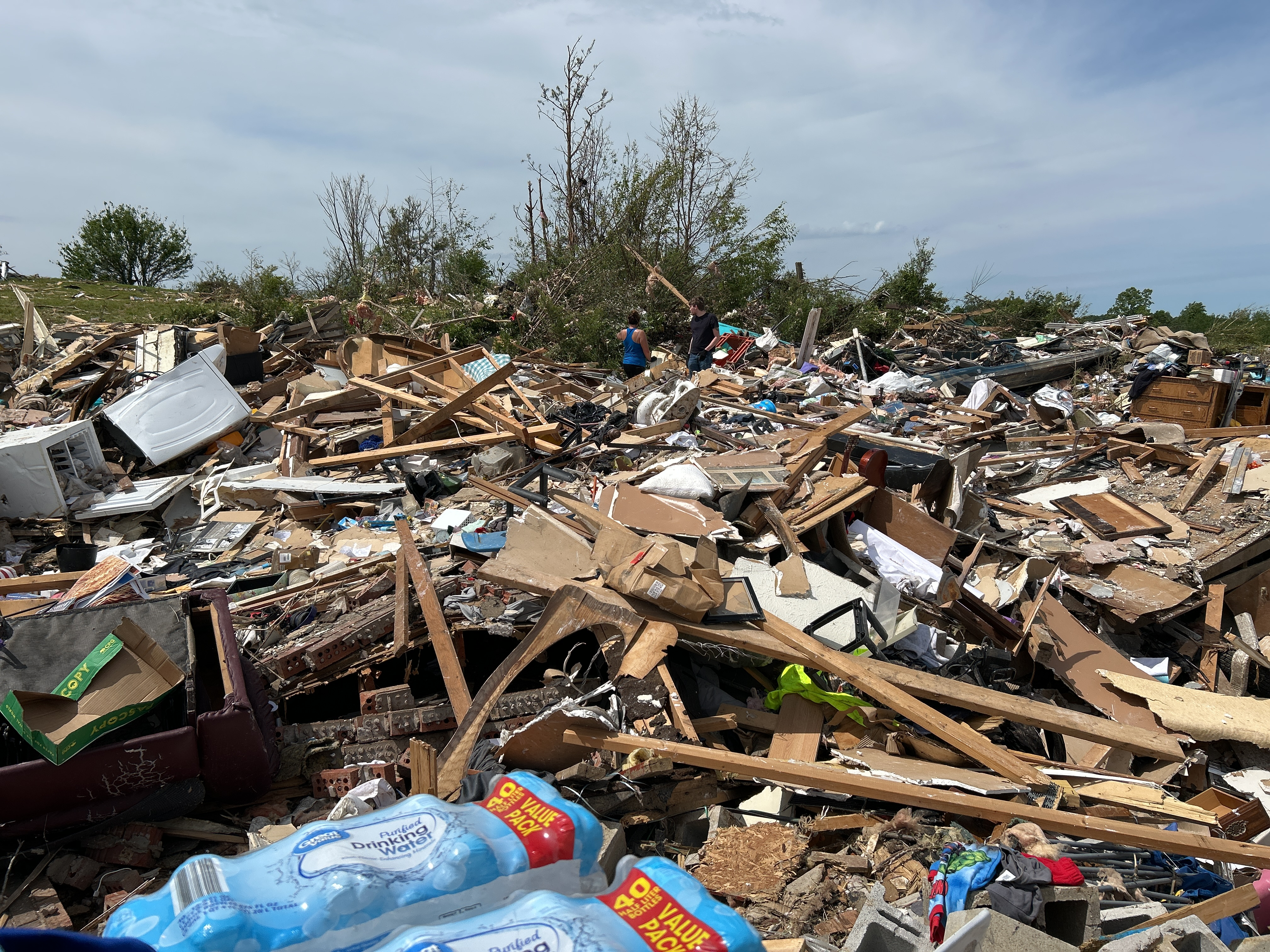
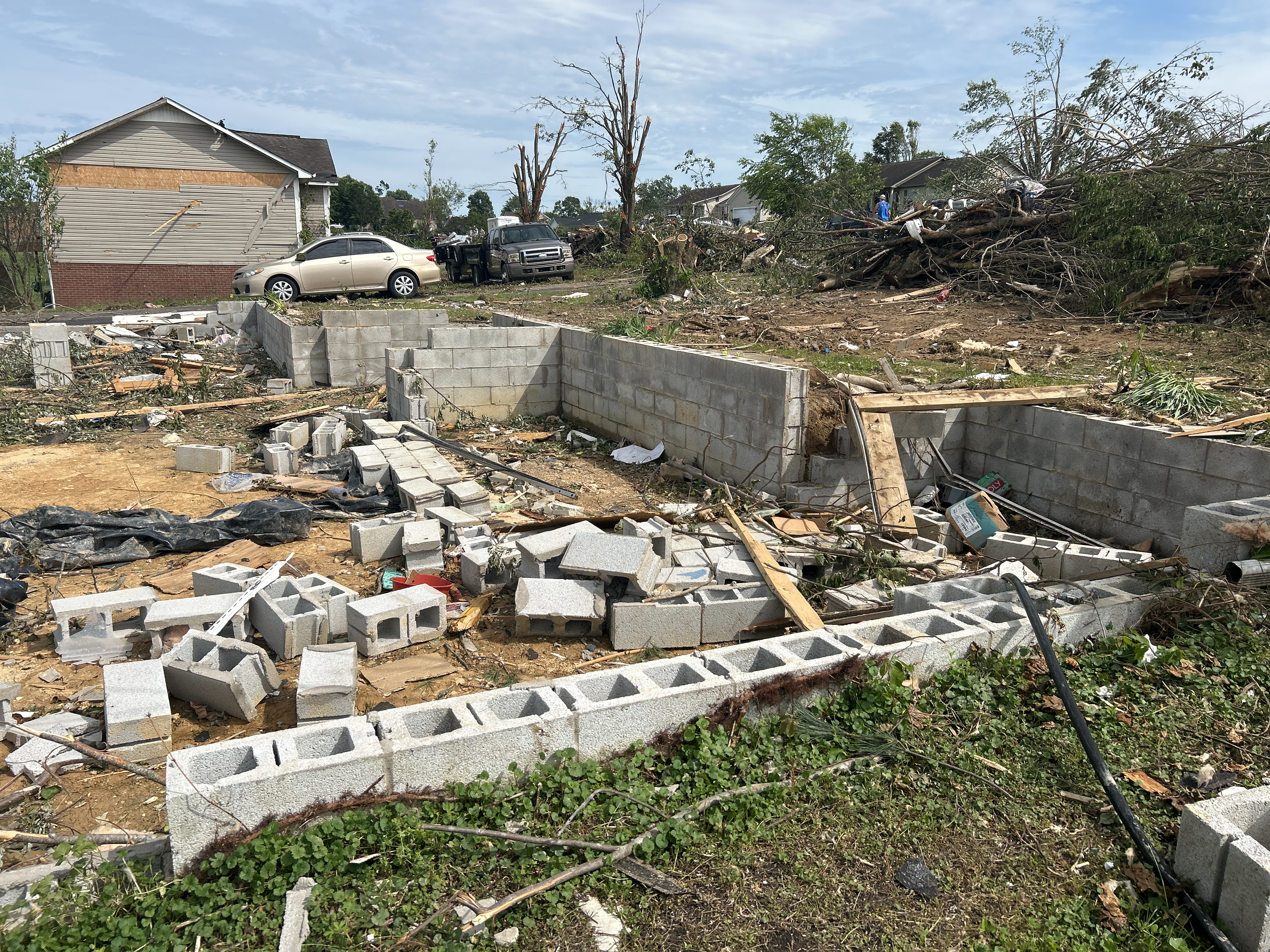
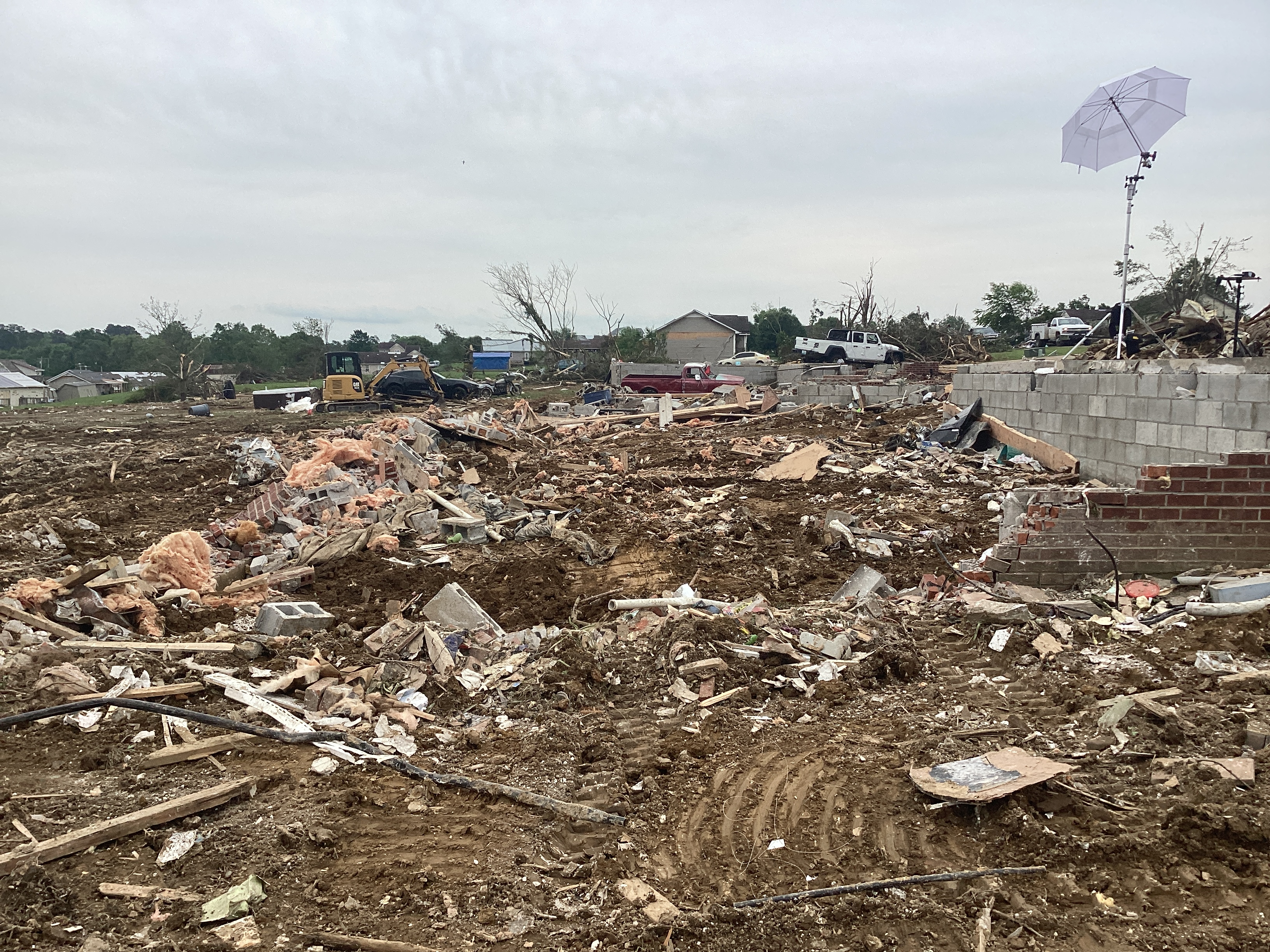
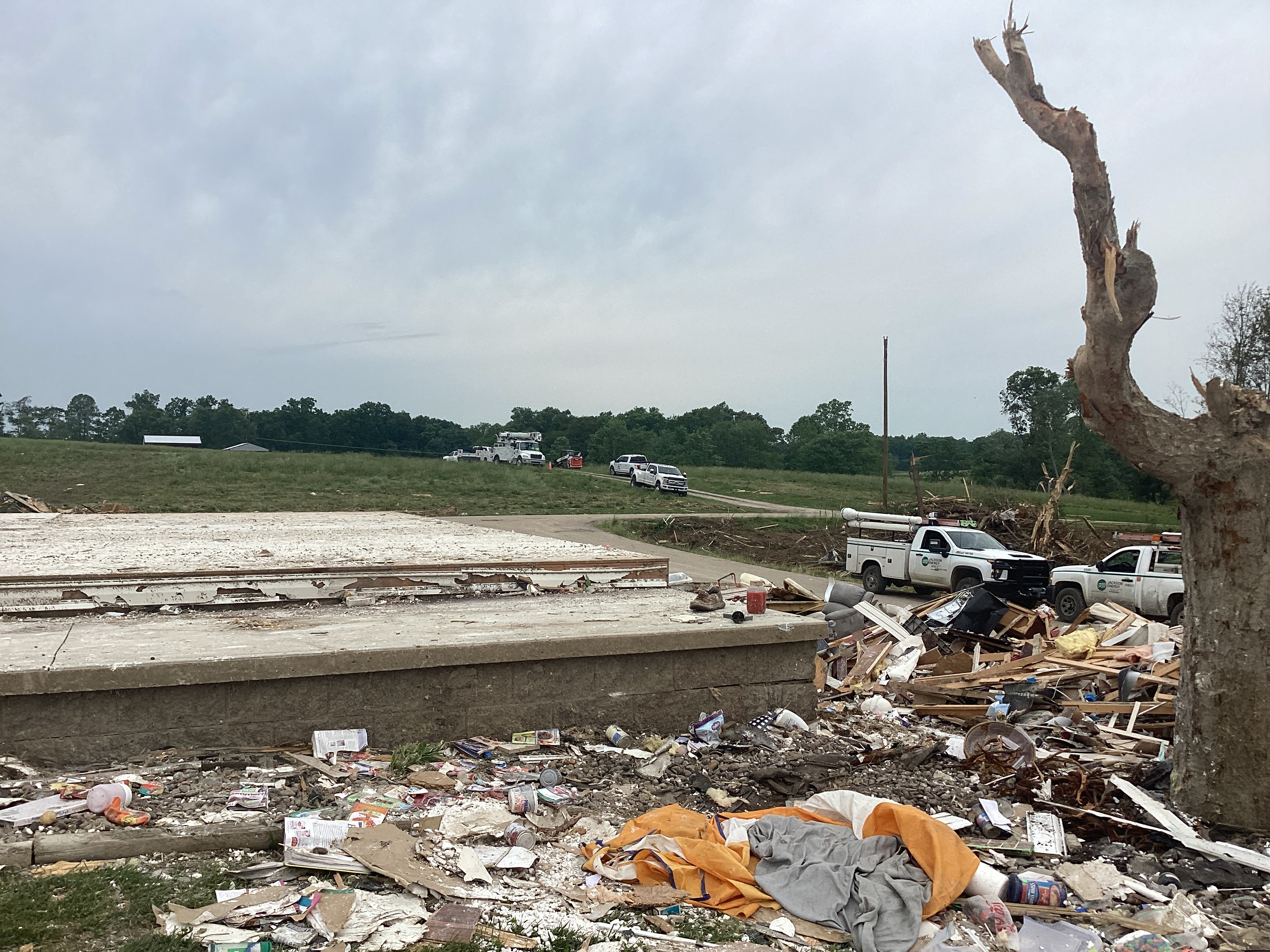
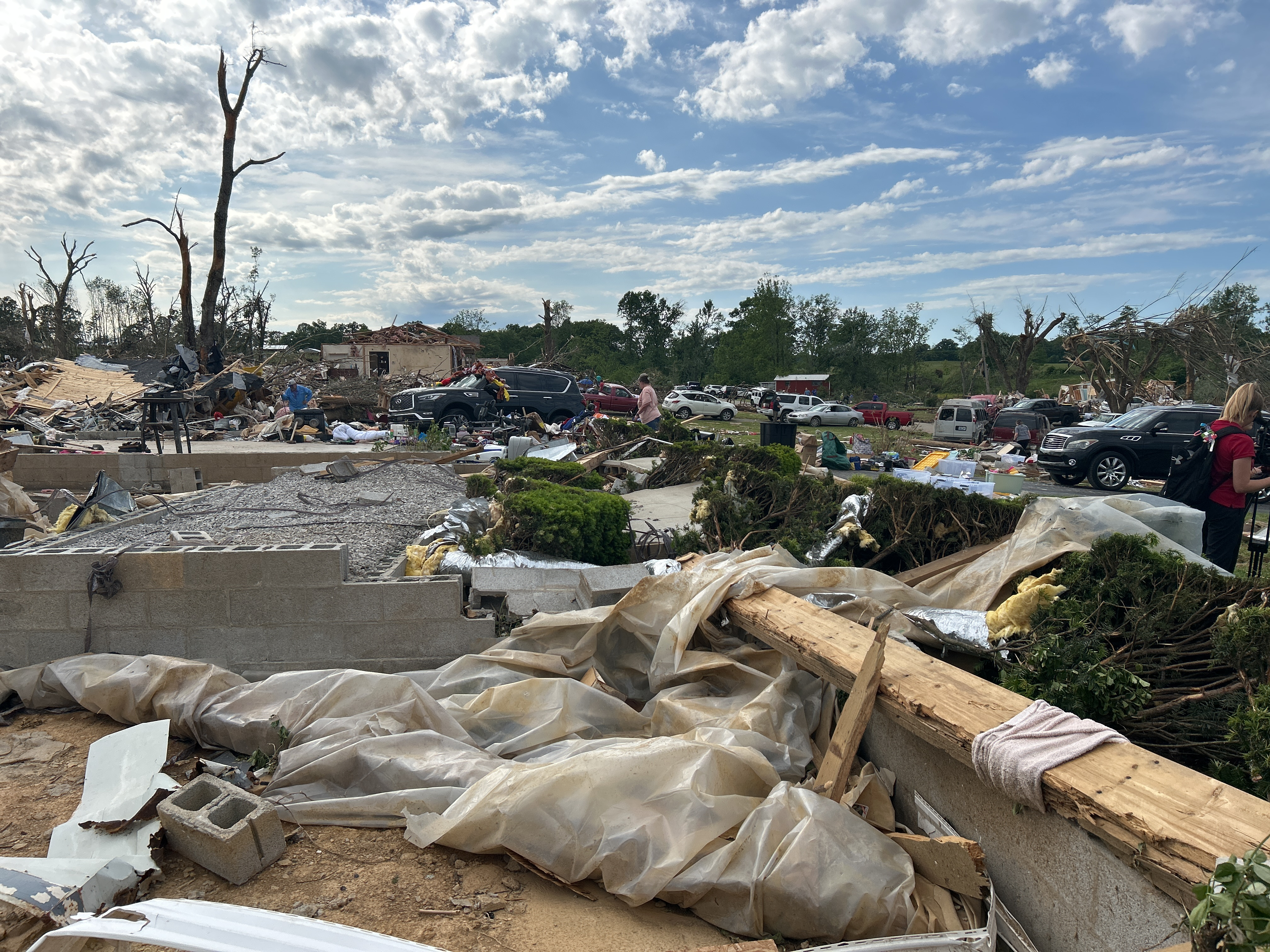
EF4 damage in the Sunshine Hills subdivision of London

== See also ==
- List of F4, EF4, and IF4 tornadoes (2020–present)
- Tornadoes of 2025
- 2012 West Liberty tornado – A long-track and deadly EF3 tornado in eastern Kentucky over 13 years prior
- 1971 Gosser Ridge tornado – An F4 tornado in similar areas, being the only other recorded violent tornado in Pulaski County, Kentucky
- 2020 Cookeville tornado – Another nocturnal EF4 tornado in Tennessee in a similar region that killed 19
- 2021 Western Kentucky tornado – A large, destructive and long-track EF4 tornado that impacted areas in western Kentucky at night over 3 years prior
