= Kentucky Route 192 =

State highway in Kentucky, United States

Kentucky Route 192
- KY 192 highlighted in red

Route information
- Maintained by KYTC
- Length: 40.5 mi (65.2 km)

Major junctions
- South end: KY 80 Bus. east of Somerset
- KY 914 east of Somerset; KY 692 east of Somerset; I-75 in London; US 25 in London; KY 80 in London
- North end: Hal Rogers Parkway in London

Location
- Country: United States
- State: Kentucky
- Counties: Pulaski, Laurel

Highway system
- Kentucky State Highway System; Interstate; US; State; Parkways
← KY 191	→ KY 193

Kentucky Route 192 (KY 192) is a 40.5-mile-long (65.2 km) state highway in the U.S. state of Kentucky. The highway connects the Somerset area and the London areas with mostly rural areas of Pulaski and Laurel counties.

== Route description ==
=== Pulaski County ===
KY 192 begins at an intersection with KY 80 Bus. (East Mt. Vernon Street/Mt. Victory Road) just east of Somerset, within Pulaski County. It travels to the east and begins to curve to the southeast. It intersects KY 914 It then intersects the southern terminus of KY 692 (Grundy Road). The highway curves to the south and enters Ruth. There, it crosses over Pitman Creek. Almost immediately, it curves to an easterly direction. Then, it intersects the northern terminus of KY 1643 (Colo Road). It curves to the southeast and crosses over Buck Creek and enters Daniel Boone National Forest. Almost immediately, KY 192 curves to the south and southeast. It intersects the northern terminus of KY 3269 (Poplarville Road). It crosses over Mud Lick Branch and enters Mt. Victory. There, it intersects the southern terminus of KY 1003. It winds its way to the east and crosses the Rockcastle River and enter Laurel County.

=== Laurel County ===
KY 192 continues to the southeast and skirts along the southern edge of the Cane Creek Wildlife Management Area, where it intersects the northern terminus of KY 1193. It then heads to the northeast. On the eastern edge of the national forest, it intersects the northern terminus of KY 312 (Laurel Lake Road). It then travels along the eastern edge of the forest and intersects the western terminus of KY 552 (West Pine Hill Road). The highway passes Cold Hill Elementary School. At Honeysuckle Lane, it leaves the forest. It intersects the southern terminus of KY 3432 (Parker Road) before passing Wiginton Cemetery and New London Country Club. It intersects the western terminus of KY 3012 (Esquire Road). Almost immediately, it has an interchange with Interstate 75 (I-75) and enters London. The highway intersects KY 1006 (Old Whitley Road/West 5th Street). It curves to the southeast and intersects KY 363 (Keavy Road/Whitley Road). It curves to the northeast and intersects U.S. Route 25 (US 25; South Laurel Road/South Main Street). It immediately crosses over Whitley Branch. The next intersection is with KY 229 (Barbourville Road). It then crosses over some railroad tracks and then intersects KY 80 (Manchester Road). It then meets its eastern terminus, an intersection with the Hal Rogers Parkway.

== Major intersections ==
County	Location	mi	km	Destinations	Notes
Pulaski		0.0	0.0	KY 80 Bus. (East Mt. Vernon Street/Mt. Victory Road) to KY 80	Western terminus
Pulaski		0.7	1.1	KY 914	
Pulaski		1.1	1.8	KY 692 north (Grundy Road) – Shopville	Southern terminus of KY 692
Pulaski		7.2	11.6	KY 1643 south (Colo Road)	Northern terminus of KY 1643
Pulaski	Daniel Boone National Forest	11.4	18.3	KY 3269 south (Poplarville Road) – Poplarville	Northern terminus of KY 3269
Pulaski	Mt. Victory	14.4	23.2	KY 1003 north	Southern terminus of KY 1003
Rockcastle River				Unnamed bridge	
Laurel	Cane Creek Wildlife Management Area	22.5	36.2	KY 1193 south	Northern terminus of KY 1193
Laurel	Daniel Boone National Forest	29.0	46.7	KY 312 south (Laurel Lake Road) – Corbin	Northern teminus of KY 312
Laurel	Daniel Boone National Forest	31.1	50.1	KY 552 east (West Pine Hill Road)	Western terminus of KY 552
Laurel		35.2	56.6	KY 3432 north (Parker Road)	Southern terminus of KY 3432
Laurel		36.5	58.7	KY 3012 east (Esquire Road)	Western terminus of KY 3012
Laurel	London	36.6	58.9	I-75 – Knoxville	I-75 exit 38
Laurel	London	37.0	59.5	KY 1006 (Old Whitley Road/West 5th Street)	
Laurel	London	37.8	60.8	KY 363 (Keavy Road/Whitley Road)	
Laurel	London	38.6	62.1	US 25 (South Laurel Road/South Main Street) – Corbin, Mount Vernon	
Laurel	London	38.9	62.6	KY 229 (Barbourville Road)	
Laurel	London	39.9	64.2	KY 80 (Manchester Road)	
Laurel	London	40.5	65.2	Hal Rogers Parkway – Manchester, Hazard	Eastern terminus
1.000 mi = 1.609 km; 1.000 km = 0.621 mi
