= WVCT =

- Keavy, Kentucky; United States
- Frequency: 91.5 MHz
- Branding: Your Gospel Eagle

Programming
- Format: Christian radio

Ownership
- Owner: Victory Training School Corp.

Technical information
- Licensing authority: FCC
- Facility ID: 70115
- Class: A
- ERP: 2,400 watts
- HAAT: 116.0 meters
- Transmitter coordinates: 36°59′1″N 84°8′1″W

Links
- Public license information: Public file; LMS
- Webcast: no
- Website: thegospeleagle.com

WVCT (91.5 FM) is a radio station broadcasting a Southern gospel Christian radio format. Licensed to Keavy, Kentucky, United States, the station is currently owned by Victory Training School Corp.
