= Kentucky Route 312 =

State highway in Kentucky, United States

Kentucky Route 312
- KY 312 highlighted in red

Route information
- Maintained by KYTC
- Length: 11.365 mi (18.290 km)

Major junctions
- West end: KY 192 near Corbin
- US 25W in Corbin
- East end: US 25E and World Drive in Corbin

Location
- Country: United States
- State: Kentucky
- Counties: Laurel, Whitley, Knox

Highway system
- Kentucky State Highway System; Interstate; US; State; Parkways
← KY 311	→ KY 313

Kentucky Route 312 (KY 312) is a 11.365-mile-long (18.290 km) state highway in Kentucky that runs from Kentucky Route 192 northwest of Corbin to U.S. Route 25E and World Drive in eastern Corbin via Corbin.

== Route description ==
KY 312 begins at KY 192, heads southeasterly and passes through the unincorporated community of Keavy. It then enters Whitley County and crosses over Interstate 75 (I-75) without an interchange. The highway descends Gordon Hill into downtown Corbin. The road then enters Knox County and ends at U.S. Route 25E (US 25E).

== Major intersections ==
County	Location	mi	km	Destinations	Notes
Laurel		0.000	0.000	KY 192 (Laurel Road)	Western terminus
Laurel		3.481	5.602	KY 3430 east (Level Green Road)	Western terminus of KY 3430
Laurel	Keavy	4.071	6.552	KY 363 north (Keavy Road)	Southern terminus of KY 363
Laurel		6.189	9.960	KY 3430 west (Level Green Road) / Rooks Creek Road	Eastern terminus of KY 3430
Laurel		6.723	10.820	KY 770 north	Southern terminus of KY 770
Whitley	Corbin	8.232	13.248	KY 2989 south / Texas Avenue	Northern terminus of KY 2989
Whitley	Corbin	8.890	14.307	KY 2384 south (Barton Mill Road)	Northern terminus of KY 2384
Whitley	Corbin	9.680	15.578	US 25W south (North Kentucky Avenue)	Western terminus of US 25W south concurrency
Whitley	Corbin	9.729	15.657	US 25W north (South Main Street) / East Gordon Street	Western terminus of US 25W north concurrency
Whitley	Corbin	9.962	16.032	US 25W north (Laurel Avenue)	Eastern terminus of US 25W concurrency
Knox	Corbin	10.356	16.666	KY 830 south (North Beatty Avenue)	Western terminus of KY 830 concurrency
Knox	Corbin	10.381	16.707	KY 830 north (Hamlin Avenue)	Eastern terminus of KY 830 concurrency
Knox	Corbin	10.568	17.008	KY 1629 east (Carter Street) / Vanbever Court	Western terminus of KY 1629
Knox	Corbin	10.932	17.593	KY 1232 east (Barbourville Road)	Western terminus of KY 1232
Knox	Corbin	11.365	18.290	US 25E (Cumberland Gap Highway) / World Drive	Eastern terminus; continues beyond US 25E was World Drive
1.000 mi = 1.609 km; 1.000 km = 0.621 mi
