= Keavy, Kentucky =

Unincorporated community in Kentucky, United States

- Unincorporated community
- Keavy
- Location within Kentucky Location within the United States
- Coordinates: 37°00′27″N 84°08′22″W
- Country: United States
- State: Kentucky
- County: Laurel
- City: London
- Time zone: UTC-5 (Eastern (EST))
  - Summer (DST): UTC-4 (EDT)
- ZIP code: 40737
- Area code: 606

Keavy is an unincorporated community in Laurel County, Kentucky, in the United States. Keavy is part of the Corbin, Kentucky micropolitan area. Keavy has its own post office with the zip code 40737.

== History ==
Keavy was named after a shoe brand.

== Geography ==
Keavy is located at the intersection of Kentucky Routes 312 and 363 in Laurel County.

== Notable person ==
Keavy is the birthplace of professional quarterback Jarrett Stidham, who played for Baylor University and Auburn University. He is a current member of the Denver Broncos in the National Football League.

== Media ==
- WVCT, Southern gospel Christian radio station in Keavy.
