= Boreing, Kentucky =

Unincorporated community in Kentucky, United States

- Unincorporated community
- Location within Kentucky Location within the United States
- Coordinates: 37°02′17″N 84°00′53″W
- Country: United States
- State: Kentucky
- County: Laurel
- Elevation: 1,194 ft (364 m)

Boreing is an unincorporated community in Laurel County, in the U.S. state of Kentucky.

== History ==
A post office was established at Boreing in 1884 and remained in operation until it was discontinued in 1971. The community was named for Vincent Boreing, a Kentucky politician.

== Geography ==
Boreing is located on Kentucky Route 229, intersecting with Kentucky Route 1023.
