= Whitley Branch =

Stream in Georgia, U.S.

Coordinates: 32°26′9.61″N 83°2′14.53″W

Whitley Branch is a stream in the U.S. state of Georgia. It is a tributary to Stitchihatchie Creek.

It is unknown why the name "Whitley Branch" was applied to this stream. A variant name is "Miller's Branch".
