= Kentucky Route 1006 =

Ayodhyawale

Kentucky Route 1006
- KY 1006 highlighted in red

Route information
- Maintained by KYTC

Major junctions
- South end: Entrance to Levi Jackson Wilderness Road State Park near London
- US 25 in London; KY 363 in London; KY 192 in London
- North end: US 25 / KY 80 / East Fifth Street in London

Location
- Country: United States
- State: Kentucky
- Counties: Laurel

Highway system
- Kentucky State Highway System; Interstate; US; State; Parkways
← KY 1005	→ KY 1007

Kentucky Route 1006 (KY 1006) is an 6.899-mile-long (11.103 km) state highway in the U.S. state of Kentucky. The route is located entirely within Laurel County; the majority of the highway runs along the border of, or within the city limits of, London. KY 1006 begins at the western entrance to Levi Jackson Wilderness Road State Park and terminates at US Route 25 (US 25), KY 80, and East Fifth Street in downtown London.

== Route description ==
The highway begins at the western entrance of Levi Jackson Wilderness Road State Park, through which the road continues as Levi Jackson Road. The route then crosses the CSX CC Subdivision before intersecting US 25. Between the park and US 25, the route is known locally as Levi Jackson Mill Road. Beyond US 25, the highway becomes known as Old Whitley Road and runs through the southwestern suburbs of London between I-75 and US 25. Approaching London, it intersects KY 363 at a roundabout before proceeding northwest toward I-75. Just east of the interstate, it intersects Kentucky Route 192, which serves as a southern bypass of London. Beyond KY 192, the highway becomes West Fifth Street and enters downtown London. The route terminates at US 25 and KY 80 adjacent to the county courthouse, although the road continues across US 25/KY 80 as East Fifth Street.

== History ==
The roundabout with KY 363 was installed by October 20, 2015.

== Major intersections ==
The entire route is in Laurel County.

Location	mi	km	Destinations	Notes
	0.000	0.000	Levi Jackson Wilderness Road State Park	Southern terminus; continues as Levi Jackson Road into park
London	0.515	0.829	US 25 (South Laurel Road) to I-75	To I-75 signed northbound only
London	3.867	6.223	KY 2069 east (Sublimity School Road)	Western terminus of KY 2069
London	4.201	6.761	KY 363	Roundabout
London	5.364	8.633	KY 192 to Hal Rogers Parkway / I-75	To I-75 signed southbound only
London	6.899	11.103	US 25 / KY 80 (North Main Street) to Hal Rogers Parkway; East Fifth Street	Northern terminus; continues as East Fifth Street beyond US 25 / KY 80
1.000 mi = 1.609 km; 1.000 km = 0.621 mi
