= Stitchihatchie Creek =

Stream in Georgia, U.S.

Coordinates: 32.45495°N 83.02604°W

Stitchihatchie Creek is a stream in the U.S. state of Georgia. It is a tributary to Rocky Creek.

Stitchihatchie most likely is a name derived from the Muscogee language meaning "edge stream". Variant names are "Tickee Hatchee Creek", "Tickeehatchee Creek" and "Tickehachee Creek".
