= Kentucky Route 229 =

State highway in Kentucky, United States

Kentucky Route 229
- KY 229 highlighted in red

Route information
- Maintained by KYTC
- Length: 20.7 mi (33.3 km)

Major junctions
- South end: US 25E in Bailey Switch
- KY 830 near Tuttle; KY 192 in London
- North end: US 25 in London

Location
- Country: United States
- State: Kentucky
- Counties: Knox, Laurel

Highway system
- Kentucky State Highway System; Interstate; US; State; Parkways
← KY 228	→ KY 230

Kentucky Route 229 (KY 229) is a 20.7-mile-long (33.3 km) state highway in the U.S. state of Kentucky. The highway connects rural areas of Knox and Laurel counties with London.

== Route description ==
=== Knox County ===
KY 229 begins at an intersection with U.S. Route 25E (Cumberland Gap Parkway) in Bailey Switch, within Knox County. It travels to the north-northwest, paralleling Richland Creek. It curves to the north-northeast and intersects the eastern terminus of KY 1527. It heads to the northeast and curves to the north. The highway curves to the northwest and intersects the southern terminus of KY 1803. It crosses over Richland Creek and then begins paralleling Knox Fork. KY 229 curves to the north-northwest and leaves the fork. It intersects the northern terminus of KY 1304. Just before it intersects the eastern terminus of KY 1610 (Tuttle Road), it enters Laurel County.

=== Laurel County ===
KY 229 crosses over Robinson Creek. Then, it intersects KY 830 (Robinson Creek Road). The two highways travel concurrently, cross over Little Robinson Creek, and passes Robinson Creek Cemetery before they split. KY 229 heads in a west-northwesterly direction. It passes Campground Cemetery and intersects the northern terminus of KY 1023. It travels through Boreing, and then crosses over Laurel River. The highway intersects KY 1189 (Rocky Branch Road/Parkside Road). It then enters Levi Jackson Wilderness Road State Park. There, it intersects the southern terminus of KY 2390 (J.M. Feltner Road). After it leaves the park, it curves to the northwest and crosses the Little Laurel River. The highway then enters London, where it intersects KY 192. On the eastern edge of the Dyche Memorial Park cemetery, KY 229 meets its northern terminus, an intersection with US 25 (South Main Street).

== Major intersections ==
County	Location	mi	km	Destinations	Notes
Knox	Bailey Switch	0.0	0.0	US 25E (Cumberland Gap Parkway) – Barbourville, Corbin	Southern terminus
Knox		0.6	0.97	KY 1527 west	Eastern terminus of KY 1527
Knox		3.9	6.3	KY 1803 north	Southern terminus of KY 1803
Knox		8.1	13.0	KY 1304 south	Northern terminus of KY 1304
Laurel		8.6	13.8	KY 1610 west (Tuttle Road)	Eastern terminus of KY 1610
Laurel		10.5	16.9	KY 830 south (Robinson Creek Road)	Southern end of KY 830 concurrency
Laurel		10.9	17.5	KY 830 north (Rough Creek Road)	Northern end of KY 830 concurrency
Laurel		12.8	20.6	KY 1023 south	Northern terminus of KY 1023
Laurel		16.2	26.1	KY 1189 (Rocky Branch Road/Parkside Road)	
Laurel	Levi Jackson Wilderness Road State Park	17.1	27.5	KY 2390 north (J.M. Feltner Road)	Southern terminus of KY 2390
Laurel	London	20.0	32.2	KY 192	
Laurel	London	20.7	33.3	US 25 (South Main Street) – Corbin, Mount Vernon	Northern terminus
1.000 mi = 1.609 km; 1.000 km = 0.621 mi
