= Ruth, Kentucky =

Unincorporated community in Kentucky, United States

Coordinates: 37°04′30″N 84°31′27″W

Ruth is an unincorporated community in Pulaski County, in the U.S. state of Kentucky.

== History ==
The community was named for Ruth, the daughter of a town merchant.
