= Whittle, Kentucky =

Unincorporated community in Kentucky, United States

Whittle
- Unincorporated community
- Location within the state of Kentucky Whittle (the United States)
- Coordinates: 37°1′34″N 84°56′46″W
- Country: United States
- State: Kentucky
- County: Russell
- Elevation: 1,047 ft (319 m)
- Time zone: UTC-6 (Central (CST))
  - Summer (DST): UTC-5 (EDT)
- GNIS feature ID: 509366

Whittle is an unincorporated community located in Russell County, Kentucky, United States.
