= Kentucky Route 363 =

State highway in Kentucky, United States

Kentucky Route 363
- KY 363 highlighted in red

Route information
- Maintained by KYTC
- Length: 11.105 mi (17.872 km)

Major junctions
- South end: KY 312 in Keavy
- KY 552 northeast of Keavy; KY 192 in London
- North end: US 25 in London

Location
- Country: United States
- State: Kentucky
- Counties: Laurel

Highway system
- Kentucky State Highway System; Interstate; US; State; Parkways
← KY 362	→ KY 364

Kentucky Route 363 (KY 363) is a 11.105-mile-long (17.872 km) state highway in the U.S. state of Kentucky. The highway connects mostly rural areas of Laurel County with Keavy and London.

== Route description ==
KY 363 begins at an intersection with KY 312 (Laurel Lake Road) in Keavy, in the southwestern part of Laurel County. It travels to the north-northeast and passes Locust Grove Cemetery. It curves to the east-northeast and begins a concurrency with KY 552. The two highways head to the northeast and curve to the north-northwest. When they split, KY 363 turns to the right, to the east-southeast, and curves to the northeast. It crosses over Campbell Branch and curves to the east-northeast. After crossing over Horse Branch, it travels to the north-northeast and then curves to the northeast. It crosses over Ward Branch and curves to a northerly direction, where it begins to parallel Interstate 75 (I-75). The highway travels through Pine Grove. It crosses over Lick Branch and passes Wyan–Pine Grove Elementary School. It curves to the northeast and travels on an overpass that crosses over I-75. The highway intersects the northern terminus of KY 3429 (Philpot Road) and then crosses over Cloyd and Sampson branches. On the southwestern edge of London, it intersects KY 1006 (Old Whitley Road) at a roundabout. Immediately after this, KY 363 heads to the north-northeast and enters London proper. It intersects KY 192 and then enters downtown London. It curves to the northeast and intersects the northern terminus of KY 2391 (South Dixie Street). The highway continues to the northeast and meets its northern terminus, an intersection with U.S. Route 25 (US 25; South Main Street).

== Major intersections ==
The entire route is in Laurel County.

Location	mi	km	Destinations	Notes
Keavy	0.000	0.000	KY 312 (Laurel Lake Road) – Laurel Lake Flatwoods, Corbin	Southern terminus
	2.214	3.563	KY 552 east	Southern end of KY 552 concurrency
	3.478	5.597	KY 552 west (West Pine Hill Road)	Northern end of KY 552 concurrency
	8.200	13.197	KY 3429 south (Philpot Road)	Northern terminus of KY 3429
London	9.205	14.814	KY 1006 (Old Whitley Road)	Roundabout
London	9.658	15.543	KY 192 to Hal Rogers Parkway	
London	10.879	17.508	KY 2391 south (South Dixie Street)	Northern terminus of KY 2391
London	11.105	17.872	US 25 (South Main Street) – Corbin, Mount Vernon	Northern terminus
1.000 mi = 1.609 km; 1.000 km = 0.621 mi: Concurrency terminus
