= Levi Jackson Wilderness Road Park =

State park in Kentucky, United States

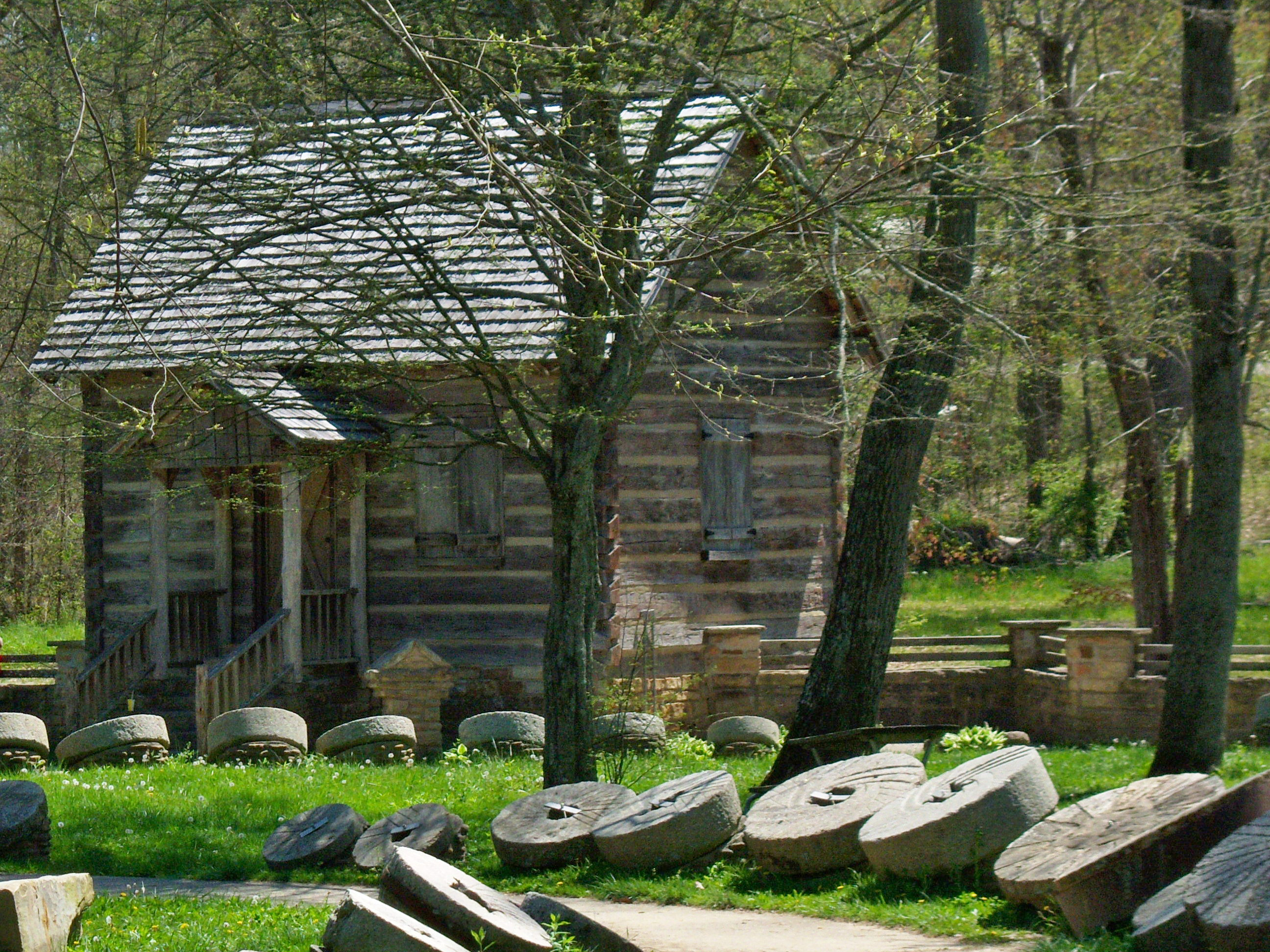
- McHargue's Mill

- Location within Kentucky Location within the United States
- Location: Laurel, Kentucky, United States
- Coordinates: 37°04′59″N 84°02′30″W
- Area: 896 acres (363 ha)
- Elevation: 1,152 ft (351 m)
- Established: 1931
- Named for: Levi Jackson and the Wilderness Road
- Governing body: London Tourism and Parks
- Website: Levi Jackson Wilderness Road Park

Levi Jackson Wilderness Road Park is a former state park located just south of London, Kentucky in Laurel County. It is now a city park under the auspices of the city of London, KY. The park encompasses 896 acres (363 ha) and includes a section of the Wilderness Road that early settlers used to reach Kentucky. The park is named for Levi Jackson, an early Kentucky pioneer. It serves as both a recreational and historic park.

== History ==
The historic Wilderness Road was the main route used by settlers for more than 50 years to reach Kentucky from Virginia. In 1775, Daniel Boone blazed a trail for the Transylvania Company from Fort Chiswell in Virginia through the Cumberland Gap into Kentucky. It was later lengthened, following Native American trails, to the Falls of the Ohio at Louisville. The Wilderness Road was rough and steep. In the early days of the trail, it could only be traveled on foot or horseback. As more travelers passed, the road improved and horse-drawn wagons were able to follow the trail. In spite of the conditions, thousands of people used it. Many of their descendants still live in Kentucky including members of the McNitt Company, a group of pioneers who were attacked by Native Americans on October 3, 1786.

The park is crossed by portions of the Wilderness Road and Boone's Trace, another pioneer trail blazed by Daniel Boone. It is still open today to hiking and while the Wilderness Road has since been paved as part of Kentucky Route 229.

Levi Jackson was one of the first settlers in Laurel County. He arrived in 1802 with his partner, John Freeman, who claimed a large tract of land along the Wilderness Road as payment for Freeman's services in the American Revolutionary War. Jackson built a large two-story house which he licensed as a tavern in 1803. He and John Freeman ran the Wilderness Road Tavern and Laurel River Post Office. The surrounding area became known as "Jackson's Farm" and remained in the Jackson family until 1931 when the land was donated to the state to honor the pioneers of Kentucky.

The land on which Levi Jackson Wilderness Road Park sits was donated to the state by his descendants in 1931. The park facilities were constructed during the Great Depression in 1935. The National Park Service spent $55,000, building cabins, foot-bridges, parking areas, an auditorium, and observation tower. Additionally, the Civilian Conservation Corps restored an old log cabin and built McHargue's Mill in 1939.

== Features ==
=== Mill ===
McHargue's Mill is a reproduction working watermill with authentic interior works. It was built on the banks of the Little Laurel River by the Works Progress Administration (WPA)in 1939. Outside the mill is a large display of millstones. The working stones in the mill were brought over the Wilderness Road in 1812. Fresh ground corn meal can be purchased by visitors. The mill is open seasonally.

=== Museum ===
The Mountain Life Museum is a restored pioneer village that consists of several cabins and other pioneer era structures. Some of the cabins are arranged with tools and household items to demonstrate what a pioneer settlement looked like during the Wilderness Road era. Relics of the early settlers and of Native Americans are also on display. Buildings on the grounds include a barn, stable, loom house, church and blacksmith shop. The blacksmith has barred windows and was used as a jail in location filming of The Kentuckian, a 1955 movie starring Burt Lancaster. The Museum is open during the season Wednesday - Saturday 10 till 5 and Sunday 1 till 5.

=== Burial ground ===
The McNitt Company was one of many large groups of early settlers who used the Boones Trace to cross the Appalachian Mountains and move into the Ohio Valley. The group of fourteen families came under attack on the evening of October 3, 1786. On that night they failed to post a guard against attacks by Native Americans. The settlers "danced and drank until late the evening" and were attacked after they had fallen asleep. Twenty-four known victims died that night with just three survivors. The dead were buried near the site of the massacre at what is known as the Defeated Camp Burial Ground, within the boundaries of Levi Jackson Wilderness Road State Park.

== Activities and amenities ==
The park is open for year-round recreation including picnicking, camping, hiking and bird-watching.

- Camping: The park's wooded campground has 136 sites. Campers have access to utility hook-ups and a grocery store. There are three central services buildings featuring laundry and shower facilities as well as modern latrines. There is a miniature golf course near the campground entrance. There is a large group camping area. The large group area includes an activity center.
- Trails: There are 8.5 miles (13.7 km) of hiking trails in the park. The trails follow the Wilderness Road and Boone's Trace.
- A community pool is located within the park, as are basketball courts, horseshoes pits and volleyball facilities. Picnic tables are scattered throughout the park and there are four picnic shetlers available for large groups.
