= WCTT =

WCTT can refer to:

- Wimbledon Common Time Trial
- WCTT-FM, a radio station at 107.3 FM located in Corbin, Kentucky
- WCTT (AM), a radio station at 680 AM located in Corbin, Kentucky
