= National Register of Historic Places listings in Knox County, Kentucky =

Location of Knox County in Kentucky

This is a list of the National Register of Historic Places listings in Knox County, Kentucky.

It is intended to be a complete list of the properties on the National Register of Historic Places in Knox County, Kentucky, United States. The locations of National Register properties for which the latitude and longitude coordinates are included below, may be seen in a map.

There are 8 properties listed on the National Register in the county. Another property was once listed but has been removed.

This National Park Service list is complete through NPS recent listings posted March 21, 2025.

== Current listings ==
	Name on the Register	Image	Date listed	Location	City or town	Description
1	Barbourville Commercial District	Barbourville Commercial District	August 2, 1984 (#84003885)	Roughly bounded by Daniel Boone Dr., Liberty, High, and Jail Sts. 36°51′57″N 83°53′19″W	Barbourville	
2	Croley-Evans Site (15KX24)		November 30, 1985 (#85002975)	Address Restricted	Rockhold	
3	East Main Street Bridge	East Main Street Bridge	March 28, 1986 (#86000605)	Engineers St. and Lynn Camp Creek; 36°57′11″N 84°05′40″W	Corbin	
4	Mitchell Building-First State Bank Building	Mitchell Building-First State Bank Building	August 1, 1984 (#84002751)	222 Knox St. 36°52′01″N 83°53′12″W	Barbourville	
5	Old Classroom Building, Union College	Old Classroom Building, Union College	May 30, 1975 (#75000788)	College St. 36°52′14″N 83°53′18″W	Barbourville	
6	Saint Camillus Academy	Saint Camillus Academy	March 28, 1986 (#86000607)	Center St. 36°57′06″N 84°05′06″W	Corbin	
7	Soldiers and Sailors Memorial Gymnasium	Soldiers and Sailors Memorial Gymnasium	August 1, 1984 (#84001794)	Union College campus 36°52′15″N 83°53′15″W	Barbourville	
8	Speed Hall	Speed Hall	April 29, 1982 (#82002731)	College St. 36°52′15″N 83°53′20″W	Barbourville	

== Former listing ==
	Name on the Register	Image	Date listed	Date removed	Location	City or town	Description
1	Owens House		June 18, 1975 (#75000789)	October 19, 1978	335 Knox St.	Barbourville	

== See also ==
- List of National Historic Landmarks in Kentucky
- National Register of Historic Places listings in Kentucky
