= Mitchell Building (disambiguation) =

The Mitchell Building was built in 1876 in Milwaukee, Wisconsin.

Mitchell Building may also refer to:

- Cobbs and Mitchell Building in Cadillac, Michigan
- Mitchell Building on the National Register of Historic Places listings in Knox County, Kentucky
- Mitchell Building, a building at the University of Adelaide on North Terrace, Adelaide in South Australia
- Dame Roma Mitchell Building on Angas Street, Adelaide, South Australia
- The Mitchell Building, a building at the State Library of New South Wales in Sydney
