= Wyrick =

Wyrick is a surname. Notable people with the surname include:

- Blair Wyrick of Single File, a band from Westminster, Colorado
- Charles Wyrick, Oklahoma Senator from District 1, which includes Craig, Delaware and Ottawa counties
- Jimmy Wyrick (born 1976), former American football cornerback in the National Football League
- Mabel Martin Wyrick (1913–2003), writer whose published books include If Quilts Could Talk
- Steve Wyrick (born 1970), American magician from Garland, Texas
- Travis Wyrick, music producer and owner of Lakeside Studios in Knoxville, Tennessee
- V. Neil Wyrick (born 1928), writer and minister in the Presbyterian Church (USA)

== See also ==
- WRCK (disambiguation)
- WRIC (disambiguation)
- WYRK
