= Calvin Bird =

American football player (1938–2013)

No. 21
- Position: Wide receiver

Personal information
- Born: February 11, 1938; Corbin, Kentucky, U.S.
- Died: June 19, 2013 (aged 75); Kingsport, Tennessee, U.S.
- Listed height: 6 ft 2 in (1.88 m)
- Listed weight: 185 lb (84 kg)

Career information
- High school: Corbin
- College: Kentucky (1958–1960)
- NFL draft: 1961: 17th round, 237th overall pick
- AFL draft: 1961: 6th round, 47th overall pick

Career history
- New York Jets (1963)*
- * Offseason or practice squad member only

Awards and highlights
- First-team All-SEC (1960); Second-team All-SEC (1959); University of Kentucky Athletics Hall of Fame; Kentucky Wildcats No. 21 retired

James Calvin Bird (February 11, 1938 – June 19, 2013) was an American football halfback who played college football for the Kentucky Wildcats and spent an off-season in the American Football League (AFL) with the New York Jets as a wide receiver.

== Early life ==
Bird grew up in Corbin, Kentucky and played football and basketball and ran track at Corbin High School. He was one of four brothers, all of whom played sports at Corbin and later in college. In football, he led his team to the state championship as a junior and was selected All-State as a junior and senior. He also set the state scoring record his junior year and the national scoring record his senior year, the latter in which he scored 264 points. In basketball, he averaged 32 points per game as a senior. The school later retired his No. 66 football jersey.

== College career ==
Bird attended the University of Kentucky and played football for head coach Blanton Collier. He played five positions for the Wildcats, including halfback, kick returner, wide receiver, and defensive back. He was chosen as Southeastern Conference (SEC) Sophomore of the Year in 1958 after leading the conference in receptions and receiving yards. He was a second-team All-SEC selection in 1959 and a first-team All-SEC selection as a senior in 1960.

Bird led Kentucky in receiving and all-purpose yards in each of his three seasons playing for the team. His proudest achievement was beating Tennessee all three seasons. In 1958 and 1959 he scored every point Kentucky made against Tennessee. He played in three all-star games following his senior season and was the most valuable player of the All-American All-Star Game. In 1997 his No. 21 jersey was retired by Kentucky. In 2005, he was elected as a charter member into the University of Kentucky Athletics Hall of Fame.

== Professional football and later life ==
Bird was drafted in 1961 by the Cleveland Browns of the National Football League and the San Diego Chargers of the American Football League, though he did not play for either team. He joined the New York Jets in the summer of 1963 as a wide receiver, but was cut by the team before the season and did not see any playing time. He married while a senior at Kentucky to Okeh Jean in 1960, and they remained together until his death 53 years later on June 19, 2013.

== Family ==
Bird and his three brothers—Jerry, Rodger, and Billy—each played sports in high school and at the University of Kentucky. Jerry played basketball for Kentucky from 1954 to 1956, and his No. 22 jersey is retired by the Kentucky basketball team. Billy played football at Kentucky in the early 1960s. Rodger was a two-time All-SEC halfback for the Wildcats in 1964 and 1965 and played three seasons in the AFL for the Oakland Raiders. His jersey was also retired by Kentucky.
