= WKDP =

WKDP can refer to:

- WKDP (AM), a radio station (1330 AM) licensed to Corbin, Kentucky, United States
- WKDP-FM, a radio station (99.5 FM) licensed to Corbin, Kentucky, United States
