= Evans Site =

Evans Site may refer to:

- Evans Site (Tonganoxie, Kansas), listed on the National Register of Historic Places in Leavenworth County, Kansas
- Croley-Evans Site (15KX24), Rockhold, Kentucky, listed on the National Register of Historic Places in Knox County, Kentucky
- Evans Site (New Town, North Dakota), listed on the National Register of Historic Places in Mountrail County, North Dakota
