= Rodger Bird =

American football player (1943–2020)

Profile
- Position: Safety

Personal information
- Born: July 2, 1943; Corbin, Kentucky, U.S.
- Died: May 16, 2020 (aged 76); Henderson, Kentucky, U.S.

Career information
- High school: Corbin (KY)
- College: Kentucky
- AFL draft: 1966: 7th round, 63rd overall pick

Career history
- Oakland Raiders (1966–1968)

Awards and highlights
- AFL champion (1967); Second-team All-American (1964); 2× First-team All-SEC (1964, 1965)
- Stats at Pro Football Reference

Rodger Paul Bird (July 2, 1943 – May 16, 2020) was an American professional football player for the Oakland Raiders of the American Football League (AFL). He was with the Raiders from 1966 through 1968 and played defensive back.

In Super Bowl II, Bird fumbled a punt by the Green Bay Packers' Donny Anderson late in the first half. The Packers recovered, allowing Don Chandler to kick a 43-yard field goal on the final play before halftime to increase Green Bay's lead to 16–7. The Raiders lost 33–14 in Vince Lombardi's final game coaching the Packers.

He played college football at the University of Kentucky for the Wildcats and high school at his hometown Corbin High School. Bird rushed for 1,699 yards and 21 touchdowns at Kentucky and played safety as well. He was a two-time All-SEC selection in 1964 and 1965 and a Time Magazine All-American in 1965, and was inducted into the Kentucky Athletic Hall of Fame. Bird's three brothers, Jerry, Calvin and Billy played either basketball or football at the University of Kentucky.

On May 16, 2020, Bird died at the age of 76 at his home in Henderson, Kentucky.

== See also ==
- List of American Football League players
