= Jackson Park (Milwaukee) =

Park in Milwaukee, Wisconsin, United States

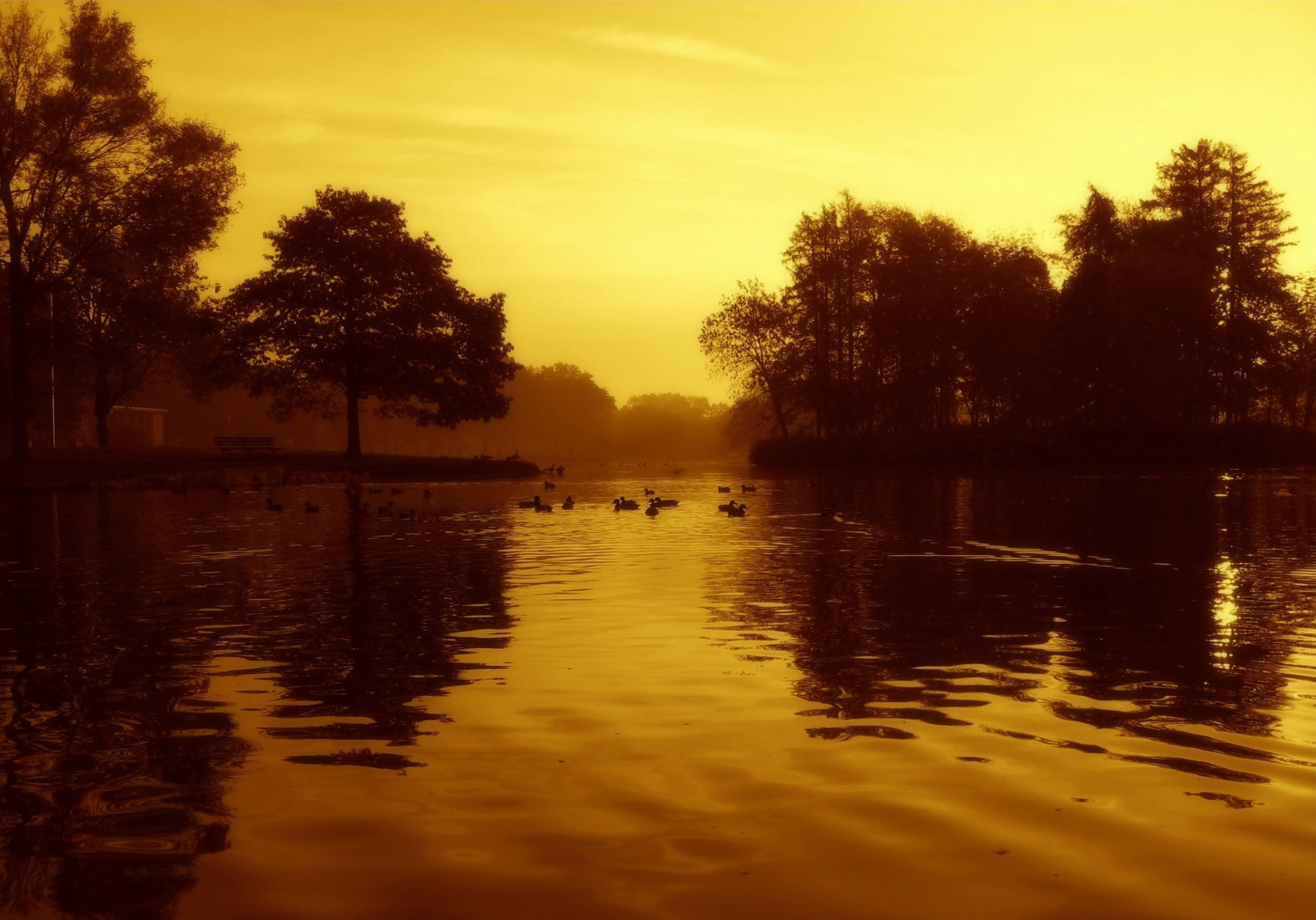
- Jackson Park ducks on the lagoon
- Interactive map of Jackson Park
- Location: Milwaukee, Wisconsin
- Coordinates: 42.995531°N 87.964057°W
- Area: 113.2 acres (45.8 ha)
- Created: 1907
- Operator: Milwaukee County Parks Department
- Public transit: MCTS
- Website: link

Jackson Park is a Milwaukee County park in the city of Milwaukee, Wisconsin.

== History ==
Jackson Park is includes a parcel of land originally purchased by the City of Milwaukee in 1907. It was known as Reynolds Grove at that time. It was renamed Jackson Park, after President Andrew Jackson, in 1910.

Clearing of the land became a priority in the 1920s as picnic use dominated the park. Planning for athletics facilities led to the purchase of an additional 53-acre parcel. Play areas for children were added, prior to the construction of an outdoor pool in 1932. The pool was the first outdoor facility in the City of Milwaukee.

A lagoon connected to the Kinnickinnic River was excavated by Works Progress Administration laborers in the 1930s. In 1950, a pavilion for boating and skating on the lagoon was completed. A bathhouse at the pool opened in 1962.

A master plan is in the design phase.

Locations in the park are displayed in the map provided by the County Parks.

== Spirit of Commerce ==
Gustav Haug created Spirit of Commerce, also known as "The Pewter Lady" in 1881. From that year until it was moved to Reynolds Grove in 1909, it stood over the Chamber of Commerce Building in downtown Milwaukee (now known as the Mackie Building). The South Division Civic Association made a gift of the sculpture in moving it to the park. An inscription on the base of the sculpture reads: "May this statue ever be a silent witness to the progress and growth of Milwaukee."
