= Spirit of Commerce =

Artwork by Gustave Haug

Coordinates: 42°59′42.5″N 87°57′45.5″W

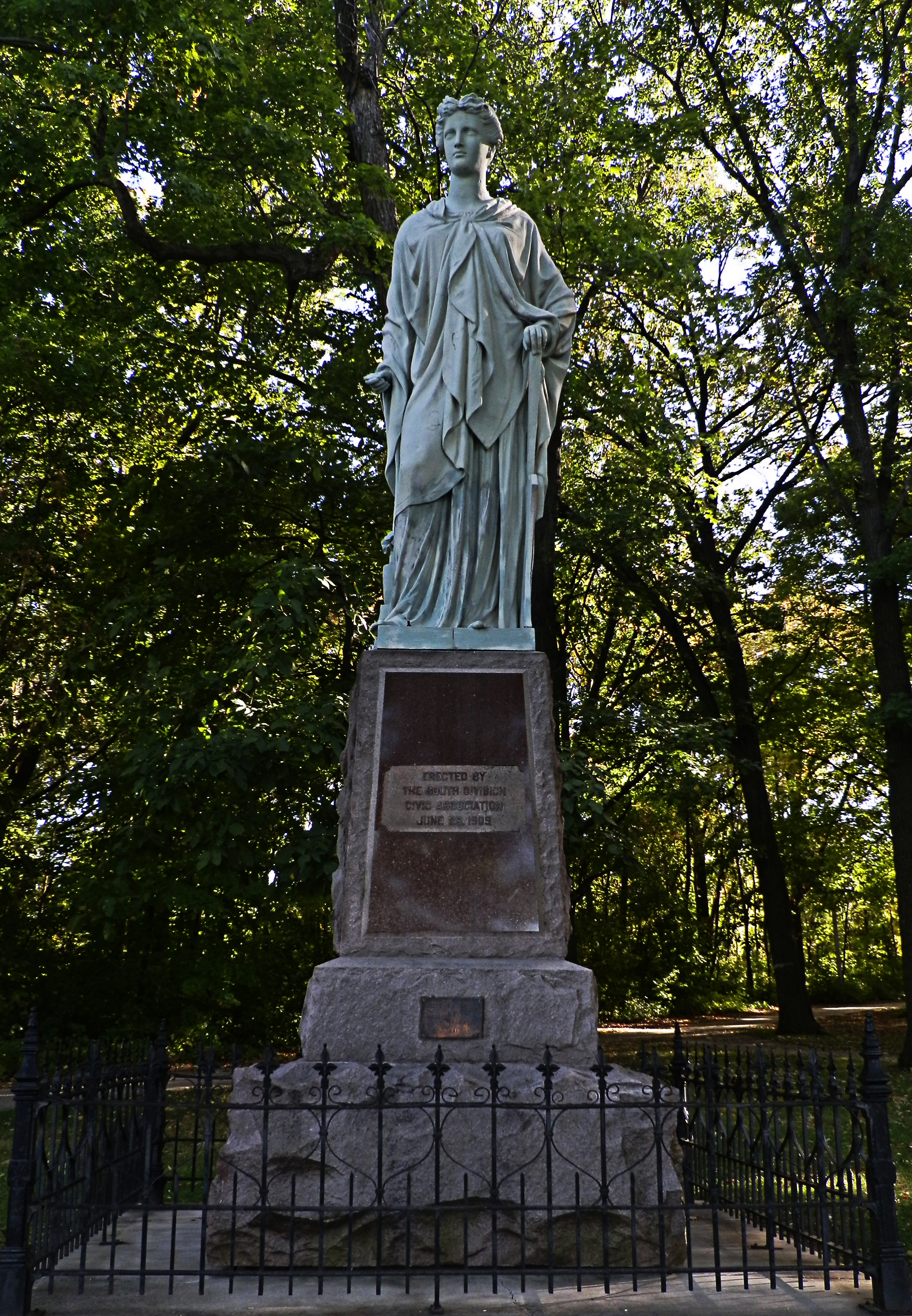
- Artist: Gustav Haug
- Year: 1881
- Dimensions: 460 cm (180 in)
- Location: Jackson Park near lagoon, Milwaukee
- Owner: Milwaukee County Parks Department, Administrator

Spirit of Commerce is a public artwork by German artist Gustav Haug located in Jackson Park, which is on the south side of Milwaukee, Wisconsin. This zinc sculpture is 15 feet (4.6 metres) tall and sits on a red granite pedestal near the park's lagoon. It is the oldest public sculpture in Milwaukee.

== Description ==
Spirit of Commerce depicts an allegorical female figure. The woman holds a quill in her proper right hand and a rudder in her proper left hand. A bag of money is at her feet. She wears a flowing robe. On the front of the pedestal, an engraved inscription reads, "Erected by the South Division Civic Association June 26, 1909." On the rear of the pedestal, an engraved inscription reads, "May this statue ever be a silent witness to the progress and growth of Milwaukee." The sculpture's base bears a plaque crediting the work to Gustav Haug with the date 1881.

== Information ==
The sculpture was originally commissioned by architect Edward Townsend Mix for the Milwaukee Grain Exchange and Chamber of Commerce building, which is now known as the Mackie Building. Haug carved the sculpture in wood, and then Mix sent it to New York to be cast in zinc at a cost of $1,500. Spirit of Commerce stood over the building's front entrance opposite another allegorical figure, Progress, until 1909 when both were removed.

=== Location history ===
In 1909, the sculpture was given to the South Division Civic Association and it was relocated, via horse-drawn cart, to what is now Jackson Park. Thousands attended the dedication ceremony, which featured a speech by Mayor David S. Rose. In 1958, the sculpture was rededicated at a ceremony featuring Mayor Frank Zeidler.

Short video of sculpture.

== Artist ==
Gustav Haug was born in Magdeburg, Germany in 1836. He studied sculpture in Berlin and Paris. In 1864, he settled to Milwaukee where he became involved in creating ornamental custom carving for the city's second courthouse (1873–1939), private residences of Alexander Mitchell and John Plankinton, and St. Paul's Episcopal Church. He died in 1887 at age 51.

== Condition ==
The sculpture was vandalized in the 1980s. The figure's hands, the quill, and the pedestal's bronze plaque were all stolen. In 1991, after years of fundraising, art conservators cleaned the statue and replaced its missing parts.
