= The Times-Tribune =

The Times-Tribune may refer to:

- The Times-Tribune (Corbin)
- The Scranton Times-Tribune
