= Jerry Smith (basketball, born 1941) =

American basketball player

Personal information
- Born: October 7, 1941 (age 85)
- Listed height: 6 ft 2 in (1.88 m)
- Listed weight: 185 lb (84 kg)

Career information
- High school: Corbin (Corbin, Kentucky)
- College: Furman (1960–1963)
- NBA draft: 1963: 2nd round, 12th overall pick
- Drafted by: Detroit Pistons
- Position: Guard
- Number: 50

Career highlights
- 3× First-team All-SoCon (1961–1963); No. 50 retired by Furman Paladins
- Stats at Basketball Reference

Jerry Smith (born October 7, 1941) is an American former basketball player. He was the 12th overall pick by the Detroit Pistons in the 1963 NBA draft. Smith came from Corbin, Kentucky to Furman University, where he averaged 23.2 points per game for his career.

== College career ==
Coming from Corbin High School, which had also produced Frank Selvy, Smith was heavily recruited, but decided to follow in Selvy's footsteps and attend Furman.

Smith became a three-time All-Southern Conference player for Furman University and was a prolific scorer. He averaged 22.4 points in 1960–1961, 27.0 in 1961–1962 and 20.3 in 1962–1963. Smith led the Southern Conference in scoring with in 1962 and earned All-America Second Team honors that year. Smith remains Furman's all–time leader in career free throw percentage at 82.2%, and ranks fifth in program history with 1,885 career points, averaging 23.2 points per game for his career under coach Lyles Alley.

== Professional career ==
On April 30, 1963, the Detroit Pistons selected Smith in Round 2 with Pick 4 (#12 overall) in the 1963 NBA Draft. Smith agreed to contract terms with the Pistons on July 9, 1963. The Pistons ultimately kept first-round pick Eddie Miles instead, (Miles was the only rookie kept on the team) with Smith being cut from the roster on October 15, 1963.

== Honors ==
- Smith was inducted into the Furman Athletic Hall of Fame in 1988
- Smith had his No. 50 retired by Furman in 2010 and joined Frank Selvy (28), Clyde Mayes (34), Darrell Floyd (33), Jonathan Moore (25) and Nield Gordon (27) as the only players to have their number retired.
