= Corbin High School =

Coordinates: 36.9316°N 84.0947°W

Location
- 1901 Snyder Street; Corbin, (Whitley County), Kentucky 40701; United States

Information
- Type: Public high school
- School district: Corbin Independent Schools
- Principal: Steve Jewell
- Staff: 51.09 (FTE)
- Enrollment: 813 (2023-2024)
- Student to teacher ratio: 15.91
- Colors: Red and white
- Nickname: Redhounds
- Website: https://www.corbinschools.org/corbin-high-school

Corbin High School (CHS) is a senior high school in Corbin, Kentucky, United States. A part of the Corbin Independent School District, it serves grades 9–12. In 2016, it had about 950 students.

== Athletics ==
Corbin High had a number of notable athletes who were active in the 1950s and 1960s and became a part of professional and university athletic teams, including:

- Tommy Adkins
- Bob Barton
- Billy Bird - American football player
- Calvin Bird - American football player; a member of the 1955 team, which never had a loss
- Jerry Bird - basketball player
- Rodger Bird - American football player
- Steve Bird
- Bob Coleman
- Jesse Grant
- Steve Jewel - American football player
- Roy Kidd
- Frank Selvy - basketball player
- Jerry Smith

Gary West, a man from Bowling Green, Kentucky, who became friends with Rodger Bird while attending university, stated that the community little leagues formed the foundation for the success of athletics at Corbin High; all of the players of the little leagues attended the same high school.

In 2013, West wrote a book, The Boys from Corbin, America's Greatest Little Sports Town, discussing the school's sports teams of the 1950s and 1960s. At first, Rodger Bird declined to assist with the writing a book about his high school career, but six months later he agreed on the condition that the book also discussed the Selvys and other famous athletes from CHS.
