= News Journal (Kentucky) =

Weekly newspaper in Kentucky, U.S.

- Type: Weekly newspaper
- Format: Broadsheet
- Owner: Forcht Group of Kentucky
- Publisher: Don Estep
- Editor: Don Estep
- Headquarters: 215 North Main Street, Corbin, Kentucky 40701, USA 105 South Second Street, Williamsburg, Kentucky 40769, USA
- Circulation: 8,431 weekly
- Price: 50 cents
- Website: TheNewsJournal.net

The News Journal is a weekly newspaper based in Corbin, Kentucky with an office in Williamsburg, Kentucky, that covers Knox, Laurel and Whitley counties in that state. The newspaper is owned and published by The Whitley Wiz, Inc. a Forcht Group of Kentucky Company.

The News Journal was formed when the Corbin! This Week and the Whitley Republican merged.

For a time, the News Journal also published Somerset and London editions, but now only publishes one weekly edition, covering both Corbin and Williamsburg.

== See also ==
- The Times-Tribune: daily newspaper also based in Corbin
