= WCTT-FM =

- Corbin, Kentucky; United States
- Frequency: 107.3 MHz
- Branding: T-107

Programming
- Format: Classic Adult Hits
- Affiliations: UK Sports Network

Ownership
- Owner: Eubanks family; (Encore Communications, Inc.)
- Sister stations: WCTT, WKDP, WKDP-FM

History
- First air date: June 1, 1967
- Former frequencies: 107.1 MHz (1967–1987)
- Call sign meaning: Corbin Times–Tribune (original owner)

Technical information
- Licensing authority: FCC
- Facility ID: 14360
- Class: C2
- ERP: 50,000 watts
- HAAT: 150 meters (490 ft)
- Transmitter coordinates: 36°54′9″N 84°4′55″W

Links
- Public license information: Public file; LMS
- Website: t1073.com

WCTT-FM (107.3 FM, "T-107") is a Classic Adult Hits–formatted radio station licensed to Corbin, Kentucky, United States. The station is currently owned by the Eubanks family as part of a quadropoly with adult standards station WCTT (680 AM), talk radio station WKDP (1330 AM), and country music station WKDP-FM (99.5 FM). All four stations share studios on Adams Road on the northwest side of Corbin, while WCTT-FM's transmitter is co-located with its AM counterpart in Woodbine.

== History ==
WCTT-FM signed on as a counterpart to the AM station in 1967. The station originated on 107.1, broadcasting a classical music format before moving to adult contemporary music in the 1980s. WCTT-FM received a major signal upgrade in a move to 107.3 MHz in 1987.
