= WRHR-LP =

- Corbin, Kentucky; United States
- Frequency: 95.3 MHz
- Branding: Red 95.3

Ownership
- Owner: Corbin Independent School District

History
- Call sign meaning: RedHound (school mascot) Radio

Technical information
- Licensing authority: FCC
- Facility ID: 133957
- Class: L1
- ERP: 100 watts
- HAAT: 5.3 meters
- Transmitter coordinates: 36°55′54″N 84°5′40″W

Links
- Public license information: LMS

WRHR-LP (95.3 FM) is a radio station licensed to Corbin, Kentucky, United States. The station is currently owned by Corbin Independent School District.
