= Corbin Independent School District =

School district in Kentucky, United States

Address
- 108 Roy Kidd Avenue Corbin, Kentucky, 40701; United States

District information
- Type: Public
- Grades: PreK–12
- NCES District ID: 2101320

Students and staff
- Students: 2,875
- Teachers: 177.0
- Staff: 199.0
- Student–teacher ratio: 16.24

Other information
- Website: www.corbinschools.org

Corbin Independent School District or Corbin Schools is a school district headquartered in Corbin, Kentucky.

== Schools ==
Secondary schools:

- Corbin High School (grades 9–12)
- Corbin Middle School (grades 6–8)

Primary schools:

- Corbin Elementary School (grades 4–5)
- Corbin Primary School (grades K-3)

Preschools:

- Corbin Preschool Center (preschool)

Alternative schools:

- Corbin Area Technology Center (grades 9–12)
- Corbin Educational Center (grades 5–12)
- School of Innovation (grades K-12)

== See also ==
- WRHR-LP: educational radio station owned by the district
