= Furman Paladins men's basketball =

Men's basketball team that represents Furman University

2026–27 Furman Paladins men's basketball team
- University: Furman University
- First season: 1908–09; 118 years ago
- Athletic director: Jason Donnelly
- Head coach: Bob Richey (10th season)
- Location: Greenville, South Carolina
- Arena: Timmons Arena (capacity: 4,000)
- Conference: SoCon
- Nickname: Paladins
- Colors: Royal purple and white
- All-time record: 1,387–1,339 (.504)

NCAA Division I tournament Sweet Sixteen
- 1974

NCAA Division I tournament appearances
- 1971, 1973, 1974, 1975, 1978, 1980, 2023, 2026

Conference tournament champions
- 1971, 1973, 1974, 1975, 1978, 1980, 2023, 2026

Conference regular-season champions
- 1974, 1975, 1977, 1980, 1991, 2017, 2023

The Furman Paladins men's basketball team is the basketball team that represents Furman University in Greenville, South Carolina, United States. The school's team currently competes in the Southern Conference. They are currently led by head coach Bob Richey and play their home games at the Timmons Arena.

Furman has appeared eight times in the NCAA Division I men's basketball tournament, most recently in 2026. The team's 2023 appearance ended a 43-year absence from the NCAA tournament after their most recent appearance prior in 1980.

== Postseason ==
=== NCAA Division I Tournament results ===
The Paladins have appeared in the NCAA Division I Tournament eight times. Their combined record is 2–8.

Year	Seed	Round	Opponent	Result
1971		First Round	Fordham	L 74–105
1973		First Round	Syracuse	L 82–83
1974		First Round; Sweet Sixteen; Regional 3rd Place Game	South Carolina; Pittsburgh; Providence	W 75–67; L 78–81; L 83–95
1975		First Round	Boston College	L 76–82
1978	3Q	First Round	(1L) Indiana	L 62–63
1980	10	First Round	(7) Tennessee	L 69–80
2023	13	First Round; Second Round	(4) Virginia (5) San Diego State	W 68–67; L 52–75
2026	15	First Round	(2) UConn	L 71–82

=== NIT results ===
The Paladins have appeared in the National Invitation Tournament (NIT) 3 times. Their combined record is 0–3.

Year	Round	Opponent	Result
1991	First Round	West Virginia	L 67–86
2019	First Round	Wichita State	L 70–76
2025	First Round	North Texas	L 64–75

=== CIT results ===
The Paladins have appeared in the CollegeInsider.com Postseason Tournament (CIT) three times. Their combined record is 3W–3L.

Year	Round	Opponent	Result
2011	First Round	East Tennessee State	L 63–76
2016	First Round; Second Round	Louisiana–Monroe; Louisiana–Lafayette	W 58–57; L 72–80
2017	First Round; Quarterfinals; Semifinals	USC Upstate; Campbell; Saint Peter's	W 79–57; W 79–64; L 51–77

== Retired numbers ==
Furman has retired six jersey numbers.

Furman Paladins retired numbers
No.	Player	Career
25	Jonathan Moore	1976–1980
27	Nield Gordon	1951–1953
28	Frank Selvy	1951–1954
33	Darrell Floyd	1953–1956
34	Clyde Mayes	1972–1975
50	Jerry Smith	1960–1963

== Notable players ==
- Jordan Loyd (born 1993), basketball player for Maccabi Tel Aviv of the Israeli Basketball Premier League, formerly in the NBA.
- Jalen Slawson (born 1999), basketball player for the Indiana Pacers.
