= WCTT (AM) =

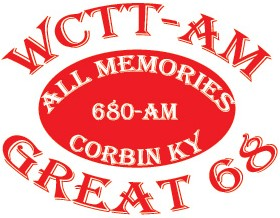
- Corbin, Kentucky; United States
- Frequency: 680 kHz
- Branding: Great 68

Programming
- Format: Adult standards

Ownership
- Owner: Eubanks family; (Encore Communications, Inc)
- Sister stations: WCTT-FM, WKDP (AM), WKDP-FM

History
- First air date: 1947 (first license granted, at 1400)
- Former frequencies: 1400 kHz (1947–1951)
- Call sign meaning: Corbin Times-Tribune (original owner)

Technical information
- Licensing authority: FCC
- Facility ID: 14361
- Class: B
- Power: 770 watts day 830 watts night
- Transmitter coordinates: 36°54′9″N 84°4′50″W
- Translator: 105.3 W287DL (Corbin)

Links
- Public license information: Public file; LMS
- Website: wctt.com

WCTT (680 AM) is a radio station broadcasting an adult standards format known as Great 68. Licensed to Corbin, Kentucky, United States. The station is currently owned by the Eubanks family as part of a quadropoly with CHR/Top 40 station WCTT-FM (107.3 FM), Talk radio station WKDP (1330 AM), and country music station WKDP-FM (99.5 FM). All four stations share studios on Adams Road northwest of Corbin near the intersection of I-75 and US 25E, while WCTT's transmitter facilities are located in the nearby Woodbine community. The station maintains an FM translator: W287DL (105.3 FM). The translator's transmitter is located at the studios on Adams Road.

== History ==
WCTT went on-the-air May 5, 1947, at 2:00 p.m., inaugurating its broadcast with a performance of The Star-Spangled Banner by the Corbin Chapel Choir. The station was owned by J. Springer Robinson, owner of The Harlan Daily Enterprise, and John L. Crawford. Per the FCC history cards, the station was first licensed on 1400 kilohertz to the local newspaper, the Corbin Times-Tribune. The transmitter was located 0.7 miles south of the Corbin city limits on US-25 North. In 1951, the frequency was changed to the current 680 kHz.

In its early days, WCTT served as an important outlet for local music. One program that highlighted musicians was a Sunday night barn dance program titled Minstrels, which ran through the mid-1950s. Another important feature of early WCTT was a weekday morning show that aired from 8:30 to 9 a.m. and originated from local business Bailey's Country Store in nearby Williamsburg. The program covered a variety of topics, including serving as a local tradio outlet.

In 1960, the license was transferred to Tri-County Broadcasting, and in 1980 to Crawford Enterprises, under the control of Mary Heath Robinson. The WCTT stations were sold to its current owners, the Eubank family under the licensee Encore Communications, Inc in 1995.

As of 1989, the station broadcast a country music format.

According to the FCC ownership reports from 1999 through 2019, the licensee (Encore Communications, Inc) is owned by Eubanks Electrical Supply on South Main Street, which is owned by Dallas and Peggy Eubanks, who are husband and wife. They also own WKDP (AM) and WKDP-FM, which are licensed in Corbin.
