= Mabel Martin Wyrick =

Mabel Martin Wyrick (9 March 1913 – 12 October 2003) was an American writer. Her published books include If Quilts Could Talk... I'd Listen, Tales of the Rails, How to Bury a Drifter, The Ultimate Irony, Factual Folklore, and Land Beneath the Lake. Her work has also been published in collections of Appalachian writing.

Wyrick wrote weekly newspaper columns for several years called "If Quilts Could Talk ... I'd Listen" and "Land Beneath the Lake". Her columns were regularly featured in several periodicals, including the Corbin Times Tribune, the Sentinel-Echo, the Berea Citizen, Appalachian Heritage, and Back Home in Kentucky. She also published six books, three of which told the stories of early life in the hills of Southeastern Kentucky. She also published two books of fiction which were set in the Laurel County, Kentucky area, and one book of railroad tales as told to her by her second husband, Wilson L. Wyrick.

She married Lohren F. Martin Sr. on 23 November 1929, and moved to his family's farm on Muddy Gut Creek in Laurel County. They had five children, one of whom died as a toddler. During this time, Wyrick primarily ran the household and farmed. However, she also worked outside the home during the auctions at the Dean-Planters Tobacco Warehouse in London, Kentucky. After her husband's death in 1976, Wyrick moved to Corbin, Kentucky, where she quickly became involved in the community. She was instrumental in beginning a library for the Senior Citizen's Center by gathering books herself and soliciting donations for books from many of the Corbin merchants and residents. She also volunteered in the Adult Literacy project and taught several people to read because she found so much enjoyment in reading herself.

Wyrick began her writing career in 1978 at the request of the editor of Corbin Times Tribune. Her first newspaper columns described her experiences while traveling in the Holy Land. She quickly expanded her columns to tell stories from her childhood as well as stories passed down through her friends and family. Her unique style allowed the reader to peek in at life during a simpler time when neighbors lived, worked, laughed, cried, and worshipped together. As a result, her columns were an instant success. She coined the term “Factual Folklore” to describe her writing - tales based on fact which have been passed down through the generations. In a 1999 interview with the Lexington Herald, Wyrick said that, “Factual folklore is my link between folklore and history. It's the history that wasn't written down, but should have been.”
