= Saint Camillus Academy =

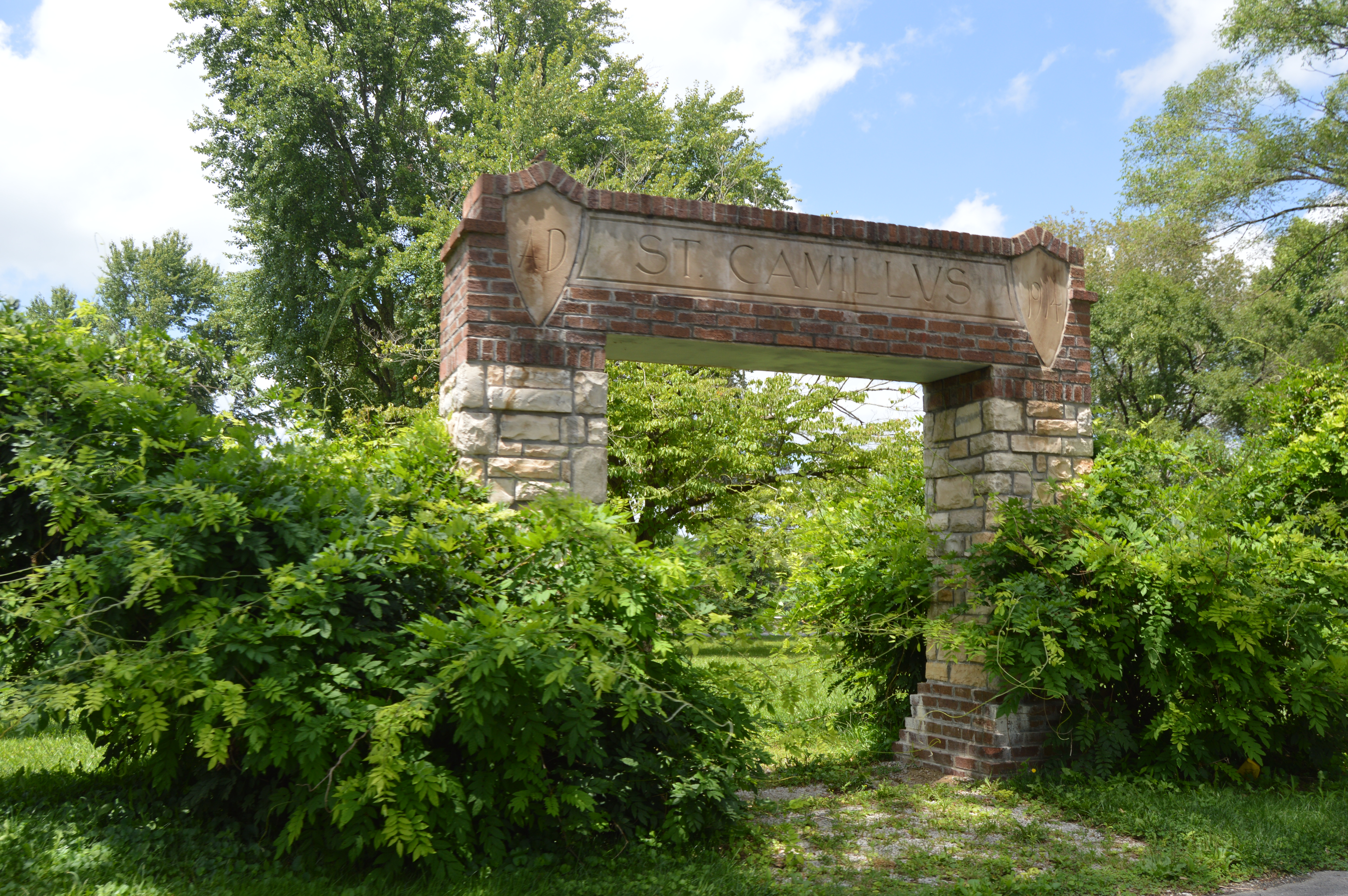
- The post and lintel around what was formerly the entrance to the original building

Location
- 709 Roy Kidd Avenue; Corbin, Kentucky 40701; United States

Information
- Denomination: Roman Catholic
- Established: 1908
- Founder: Sisters of Divine Providence
- School district: Corbin Independent School District
- Oversight: Diocese of Lexington
- Principal: Mrs. Dorothy Smith
- Teaching staff: 11.4 (FTE) (as of 2007-08)
- Grades: Prekindergarten-8
- Gender: Coed
- Enrollment: 197 (as of 2007-08)
- Student to teacher ratio: 14.3 (as of 2007-08)
- Website: www.stcamillusacademy.cdlex.org

Saint Camillus Academy was a Catholic school located in Corbin, Kentucky, established in 1908 by the Sisters of Divine Providence with the help of the Diocese of Covington. The school originally served students in grades 1-12 and included boarding facilities for girls.

In 2013 the school closed and its building was sold to Corbin Schools System. Demolition of the current building was set to begin in early 2016 with the construction of the new CMS to follow soon after.

== History ==
Sacred Heart School was established as a parish school in 1908 with the assistance of the Sisters of Divine Providence. The Sisters took over operation of the school from the parish in 1913, at which time the school became known as Saint Camillus Academy. A new building was constructed and a high school program added. By 1972, the school had an enrollment of 300 in grades 1-12 and a second building was erected. A kindergarten program was added in 1985. In 1996, a Montessori preschool program was added and the high school program was closed.

=== Closure ===
In 2013 the school closed due to decreased enrollment and its building was sold to Corbin Schools System. For the 2013–14 and the first semester of the 2014–15 school year it was home to the Corbin Educational Center. The Corbin Educational Center, or CEC, is a Day Treatment school under the Corbin Independent School District. It provides day treatment services for students from Corbin, Williamsburg, and Whitley County. Over Christmas break of the 2014–15 school year CEC returned to the former Corbin City Utilities building. The former Saint Camillus site will now be home to the new Corbin Middle School. Demolition of the current building is set to begin in early 2016 with the construction of the new CMS to follow soon after.

== Campus ==
- Saint Camillus Academy
- U.S. National Register of Historic Places
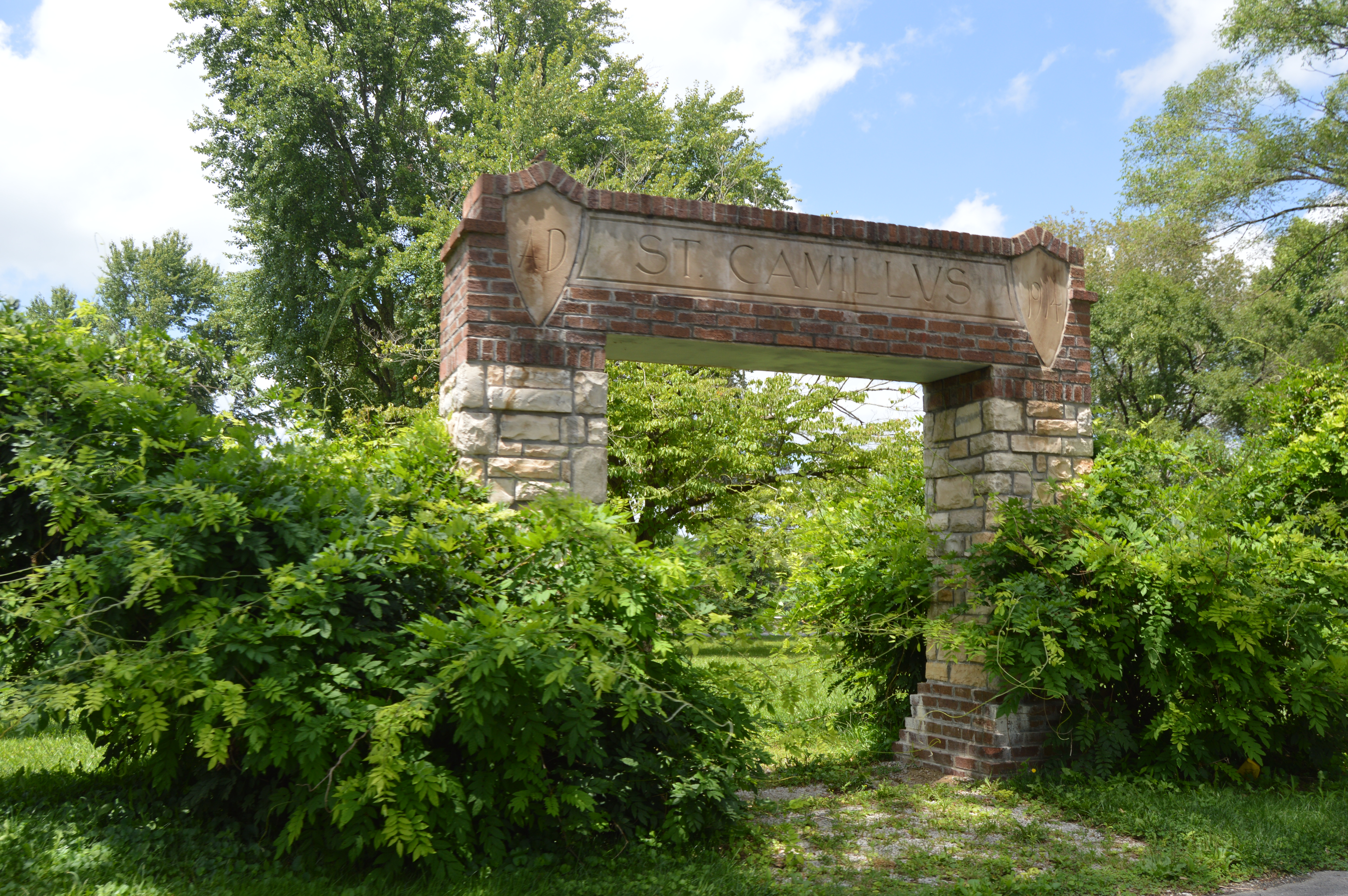
- Entryway to the original building

- Location within Kentucky Location within the United States
- Location: Center Street, Corbin, Kentucky
- Coordinates: 36°57′5″N 84°5′7″W
- Built: 1921
- Architect: Robert E. Crowe
- Architectural style: Prairie School
- NRHP reference No.: 86000607
- Added to NRHP: 1986-03-28

The school was initially housed in a rented residence on Laurel Street. A thirty-five acre site was purchased in 1914 and the school's first permanent building was dedicated in May 1915. An annex that included a chapel and library was added in 1921. After a new building was constructed in 1973, the older building continued to be used for classes and as a residence. The 1914 building was demolished in June 2008.

The current campus includes two buildings, a pavilion, and environmental science facilities that were recognized when the school was named a 2009 PRIDE Campus of the Year. Funds from the PRIDE program have assisted in the school establishing "two wetlands, a butterfly garden, a greenhouse, nature trail and two tracking boxes."

== Extracurricular activities ==
St. Camillus students participated in the National Geography Bee, Math and Science Club, Knox County Spelling Bee, and multi-leveled academic competition among the surrounding counties.
