= Mitchell Building =

Historic commercial building in Wisconsin, United States

- U.S. National Register of Historic Places
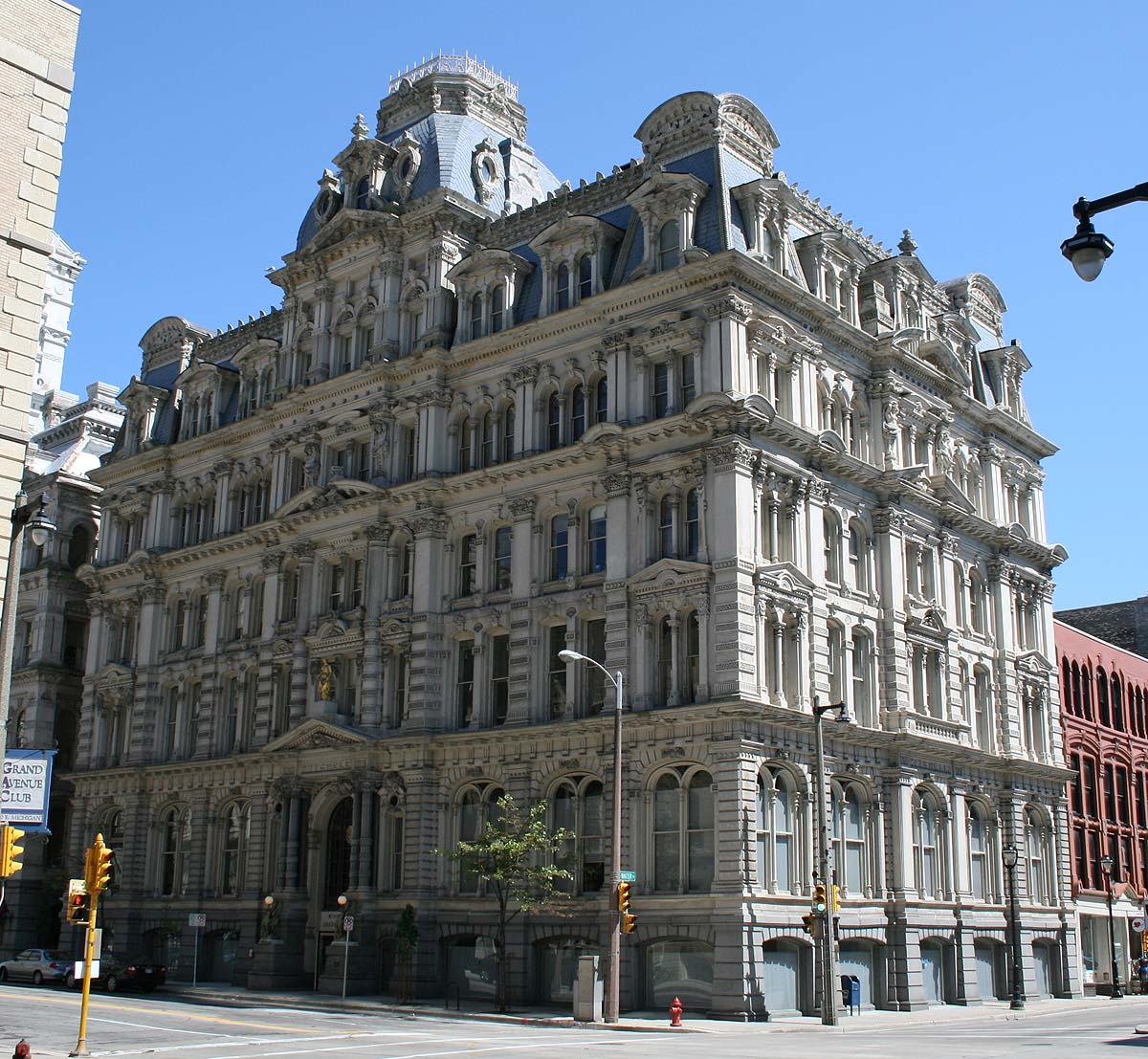
- Mitchell Building in 2009
- Location: 207 E. Michigan St. Milwaukee, Wisconsin
- Coordinates: 43.03721°N 87.90852°W
- Built: 1876
- Architect: E. Townsend Mix
- Architectural style: Second Empire
- NRHP reference No.: 73000087
- Added to NRHP: April 3, 1973

The Mitchell Building is an ornate five-story bank and insurance building designed by E. Townsend Mix in Second Empire style and built in 1876 in Milwaukee, Wisconsin. It was added to the National Register of Historic Places in 1973.

== History ==
Alexander Mitchell was a Scottish immigrant who came to the U.S. in 1839. By 1876 he was a successful businessman - president of the Wisconsin Marine and Fire Insurance Company Bank, the Chicago, Milwaukee & St. Paul Railroad, and the Northwestern National Insurance Company. He had also served two terms in the U.S. House of Representatives, representing Wisconsin's 4th District. Around that year he commissioned this new office building to house his bank and insurance companies. It replaced Mitchell's previous Marine Bank building and is believed to sit on the site of the home of Solomon Juneau, who founded Milwaukee in the 1830s.

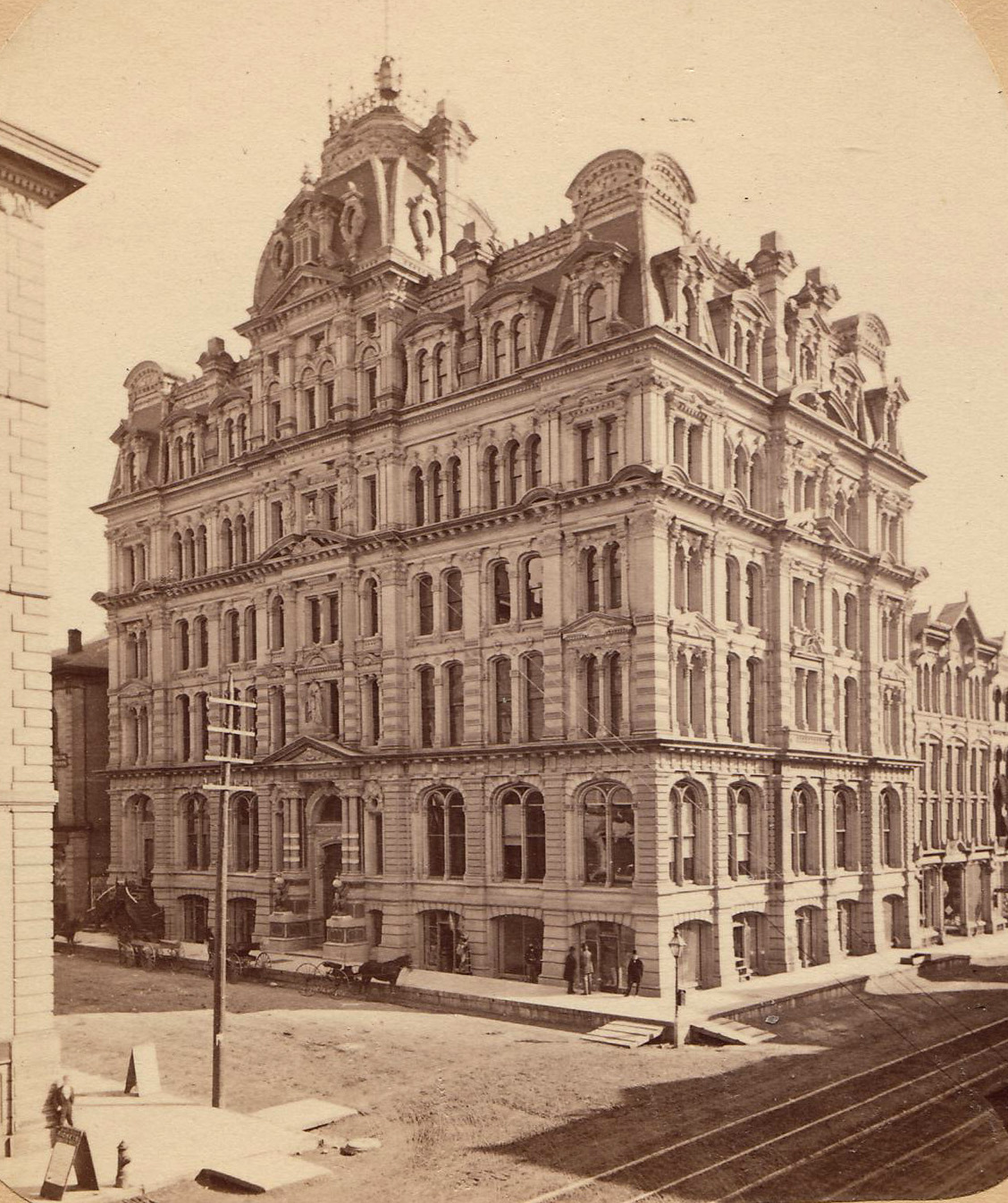
Early photo

Mitchell hired prominent Milwaukee architect E. Townsend Mix to design his new building, and Mix came through with a 5-story rectangular block, in then-popular Second Empire style, with its first-story walls of gray Minnesota granite and upper walls of limestone, trimmed with multiple elaborate cornices and window hoods, with a complex mansard roof and an ornate central tower. Masonry contractor John Roberts carried out Mix's design. Francis A. Lydston decorated inside with frescoes. The interior was said to be as elaborate as the exterior, with marble floors, wainscot, and elegant staircases, but much of that has disappeared with remodeling.

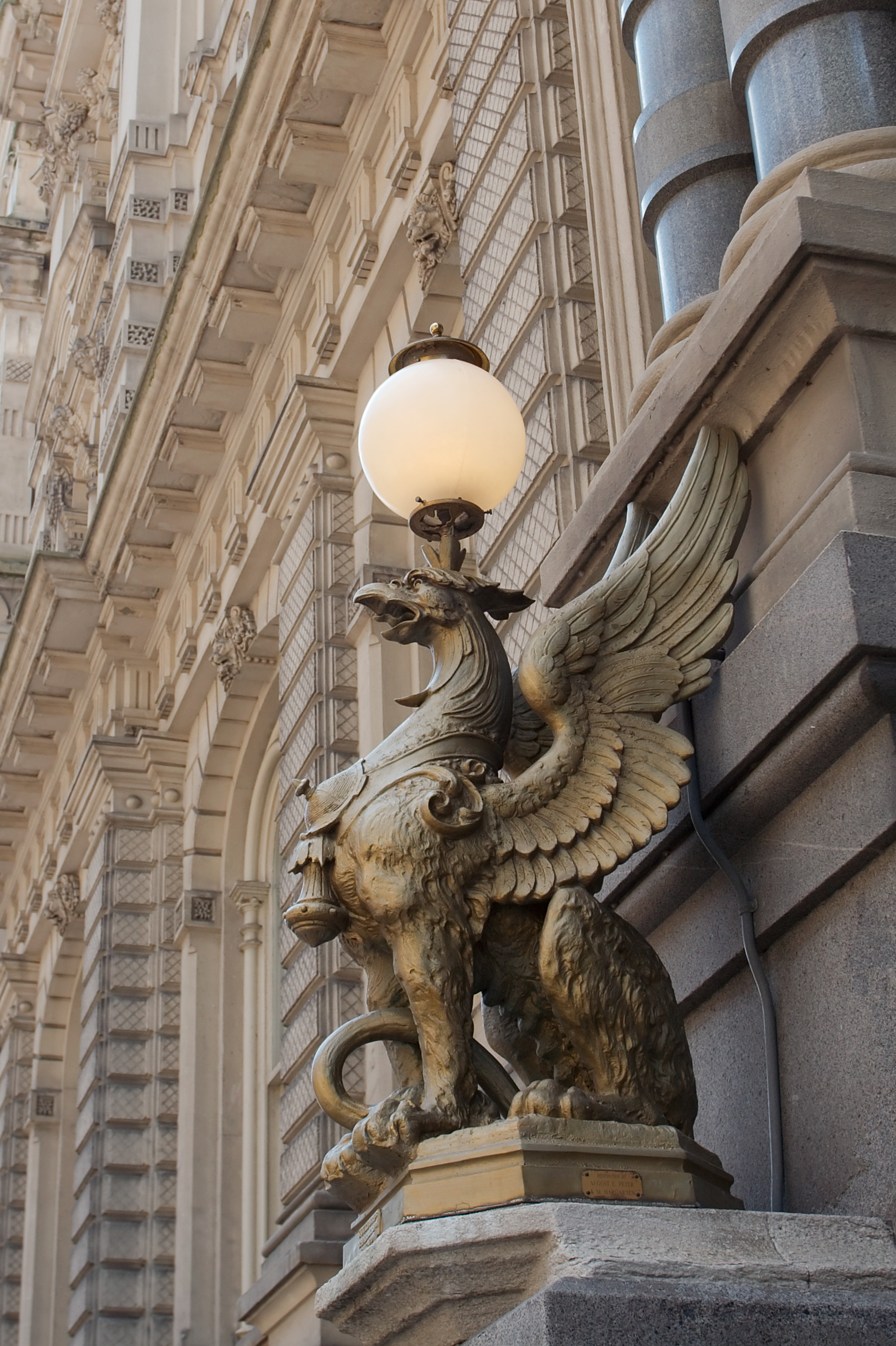

On completion in 1878, Mitchell's bank and insurance company took residence in the building. The bank remained until 1930. In 1879 the Mackie Building was begun just next door, also built by Mitchell, designed by E. Townsend Mix and listed on the National Register of Historic Places.

Today the exterior of the Mitchell Building remains highly intact, and stands as an example of Second Empire style in Milwaukee.
