= Jerry Bird =

American basketball player

Personal information
- Born: February 3, 1934 Corbin, Kentucky, U.S.
- Died: July 16, 2017 (aged 83) Corbin, Kentucky, U.S.
- Listed height: 6 ft 6 in (1.98 m)
- Listed weight: 210 lb (95 kg)

Career information
- High school: Corbin (Corbin, Kentucky)
- College: Kentucky (1953–1956)
- NBA draft: 1956: 3rd round, 18th overall pick
- Drafted by: Minneapolis Lakers
- Playing career: 1958–1959
- Position: Forward
- Number: 7

Career history
- 1958–1959: New York Knicks

Career highlights
- Second-team All-SEC (1956)
- Stats at NBA.com
- Stats at Basketball Reference

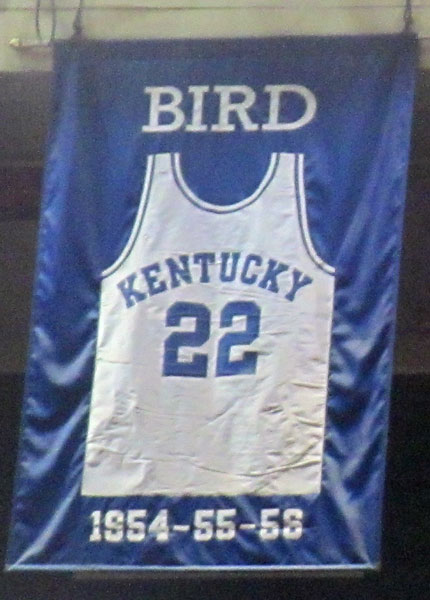
A jersey honoring Bird hangs in Rupp Arena.

Jerry Lee Bird (February 3, 1934 – July 16, 2017) was an American basketball player. Born in Corbin, Kentucky, he played collegiately for the University of Kentucky. He was selected by the Minneapolis Lakers in the 1956 NBA draft and played 11 NBA games for the New York Knicks (1958–59).

== Career statistics ==
Legend
| GP | Games played | GS | Games started | MPG | Minutes per game |
| FG% | Field goal percentage | 3P% | 3-point field goal percentage | FT% | Free throw percentage |
| RPG | Rebounds per game | APG | Assists per game | SPG | Steals per game |
| BPG | Blocks per game | PPG | Points per game | **Bold** | Career high |

=== NBA ===
==== Regular season ====
| Year | Team | GP | MPG | FG% | FT% | RPG | APG | PPG |
|---|---|---|---|---|---|---|---|---|
| 1958–59 | New York | 11 | 4.1 | .375 | 1.000 | 1.1 | .4 | 2.3 |
