= WKDP (AM) =

Radio station in Corbin, Kentucky, US

- Corbin, Kentucky; United States
- Frequency: 1330 kHz

Programming
- Format: Country music
- Affiliations: Motor Racing Network; Performance Racing Network

Ownership
- Owner: Eubanks family; (Eubanks Broadcasting, Inc.)
- Sister stations: WKDP-FM, WCTT (AM), WCTT-FM

History
- First air date: November 1961
- Former call signs: WYGO (1961–1989)

Technical information
- Licensing authority: FCC
- Facility ID: 19815
- Class: D
- Power: 5,000 watts day 16 watts night
- Transmitter coordinates: 36°56′20″N 84°4′44″W
- Translators: W250CL (97.9 MHz, Corbin)

Links
- Public license information: Public file; LMS

WKDP (1330 AM) is a radio station licensed to Corbin, Kentucky, United States. The station is currently owned by the Eubanks family as part of a quadropoly with adult standards station WCTT (680 AM), country music station WKDP-FM (99.5 FM), and adult contemporary music station WCTT-FM (107.3 FM). All four stations share studios on Adams Road adjacent to I-75 northwest of Corbin in southern Laurel County, while its transmitter is located off Combs Road in eastern Corbin.

In addition to its primary AM signal, WKDP is repeated on an FM translator: W250CL (97.7 MHz). That station's transmitter is co-located with the studios on Adams Road.

== History ==
WKDP signed on-the-air in November 1961 as WYGO. The station was founded by Tri-County Broadcasting, led by Don Mills and Cal Smith. In 1965, the station would be sold to James C. Vernon. An FM counterpart would sign on in 1967 at 99.3 MHz (now 99.5). At this time, the station aired a format consisting of pop and rock, with programming from ABC.

By 1989, WKDP broadcast a country music format. Major changes would come to the station that year. Vernon sold WYGO-AM-FM to local businessman Dallas Eubanks, who changed the stations' call letters to the current WKDP. Eubanks would also split the shared format with its FM sister and began broadcasting oldies.
