= WKDP-FM =

- Corbin, Kentucky; United States
- Frequency: 99.5 MHz
- Branding: 99.5 KD Country

Programming
- Format: Country music

Ownership
- Owner: Eubanks family; (Eubanks Broadcasting, Inc.)
- Sister stations: WKDP, WCTT, WCTT-FM

History
- First air date: 1967
- Former call signs: WYGO-FM (1967–1989)
- Former frequencies: 99.3 MHz (1967–1987)

Technical information
- Licensing authority: FCC
- Facility ID: 19816
- Class: C2
- ERP: 50,000 watts
- HAAT: 216.0 meters
- Transmitter coordinates: 36°57′14″N 83°58′41″W

Links
- Public license information: Public file; LMS
- Webcast: no
- Website: wkdp.com

WKDP-FM (99.5 FM) is a country music–formatted radio station licensed to Corbin, Kentucky, United States. The station is currently owned by the Eubanks family as part of a quadropoly with WKDP (1330 AM), adult standards station WCTT (680 AM), and Top 40/CHR station WCTT-FM (107.3 FM). All four stations share studios on Adams Road northwest of Corbin in southern Laurel County, while its transmitter is located off US 25E near Gray.

== History ==
The station signed on the air as WYGO-FM in 1967 on 99.3 MHz, with a MOR format. The format was upgraded to adult contemporary in 1984. Three years later, WYGO-FM would receive a significant signal upgrade in a move to 99.5 FM. On March 6, 1989, the station changed its call sign to the current WKDP and dropped its adult contemporary music format for its current country music. format.

As of 1989, the station simulcast its AM sister with a country music format.
