= Cobbs and Mitchell Building =

- U.S. National Register of Historic Places
- Michigan State Historic Site
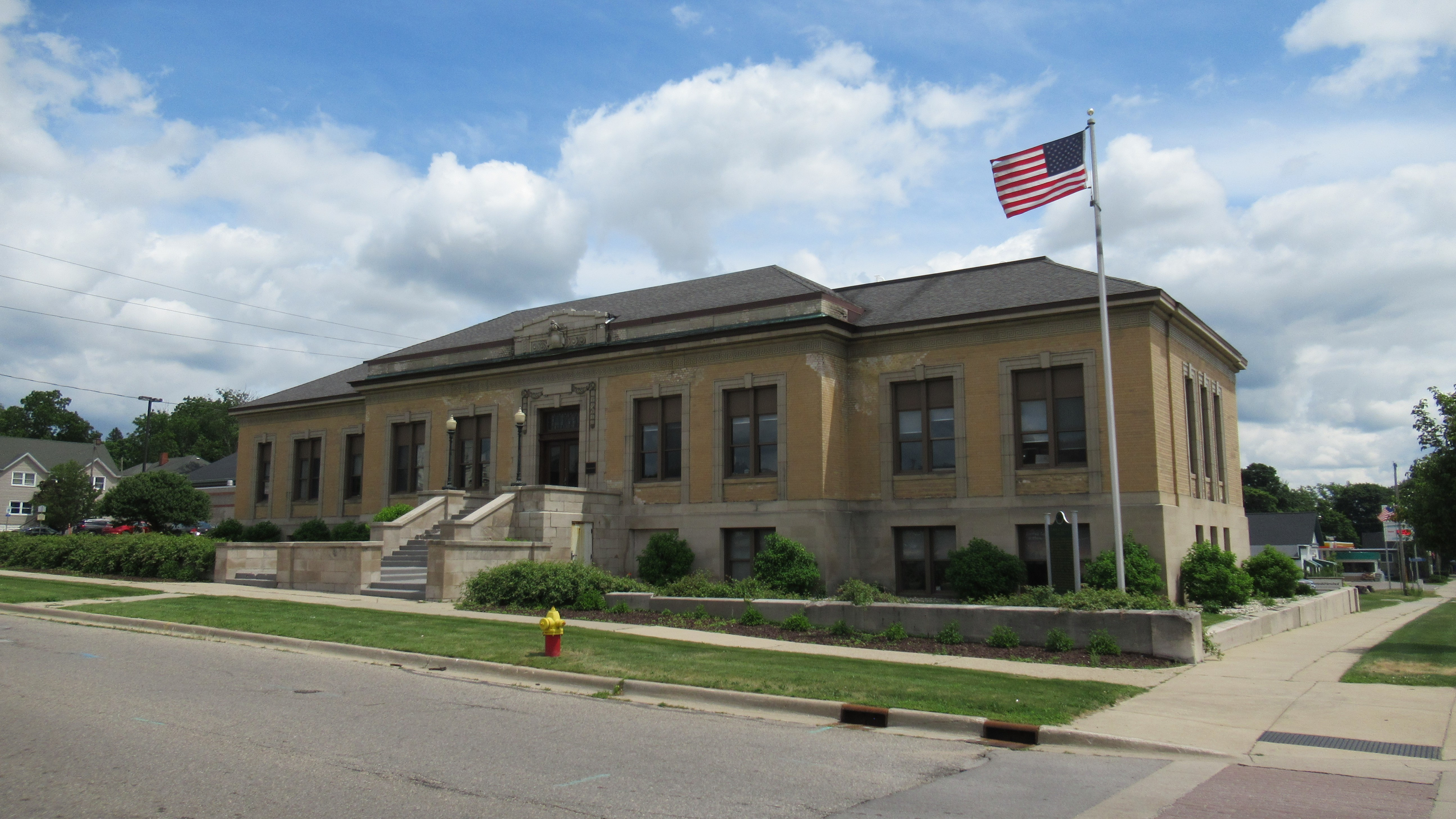

- Location within Michigan
- Interactive map
- Location: 100 E Chapin St, Cadillac, Michigan
- Coordinates: 44°14′54″N 85°23′52″W
- Area: less than one acre
- Built: 1905
- Architect: George D. Mason
- Architectural style: Classical Revival
- NRHP reference No.: 10000479

Significant dates
- Added to NRHP: July 19, 2010
- Designated MSHS: February 27, 1980

The Cobbs and Mitchell Building is an office building located at 100 East Chapin Street in Cadillac, Michigan. It was designated a Michigan State Historic Site in 1980. and listed on the National Register of Historic Places in 2010.

== Background ==
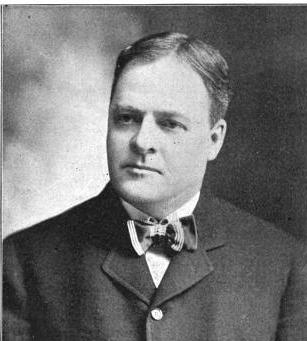
William W Mitchell

George A. Mitchell, the youngest son of Congressman William Mitchell, arrived in the Cadillac area in 1869, exploring the proposed route of the Grand Rapids and Indiana Railroad. Mitchell was particularly interested in the area near Clam Lake (now Lake Cadillac). In 1871, he returned to the area and platted a village on the shore of the lake, and by January 1872 the village had 300 inhabitants. Mitchell was able to induce many influential businessmen and lumbermen to settle in his new community, including his nephew William W. Mitchell; John R. Yale, who opened the Pioneer Sawmill in June 1871; and Jonathon W. Cobbs.

Cobbs was born in Westville, Ohio, in 1828, the son of Joseph and Tacy Cobbs. He learned his father's trade of woodworking, then moved to Butlerville, Indiana, to operate a sawmill. There in 1855 he married Nancy J. Preble; the couple had three daughters: Tacy, Fauna, and Isabelle, and adopted a son, Frank. Cobbs eventually owned three sawmills in Indiana, but decided that the Cadillac area held more promise; he moved there in 1874 and purchased the Pioneer Sawmill from John R. Yale. In 1877, he took on William W. Mitchell as a partner.

William W. Mitchell was born in 1854 in Hillsdale, Michigan, the third son of Charles T. Mitchell. He went to school at Hillsdale College, and in 1873 followed his uncle George to Cadillac. There he married Ella Yost; the couple had two children, Charles T. and Marie. He worked for his uncle for a few years, and in 1877 entered into a partnership with Jonathon W. Cobbs, marking the beginning of the firm of Cobbs & Mitchell. Cobbs & Mitchell was among the largest lumbering firms in Michigan, supplying hardwood flooring and other products to consumers. At its high point, Cobbs & Mitchell used 100,000 feet of raw lumber daily.

Jonathon W. Cobbs remained active in the business until approximately 1895, when he fell ill and turned over his duties to his son Frank. Jonathon W. Cobbs died in 1898. William W. Mitchell continued on as president of the firm; he also formed Mitchell Brothers with his brother, Austin W. Mitchell, to make flooring.

== Building history ==
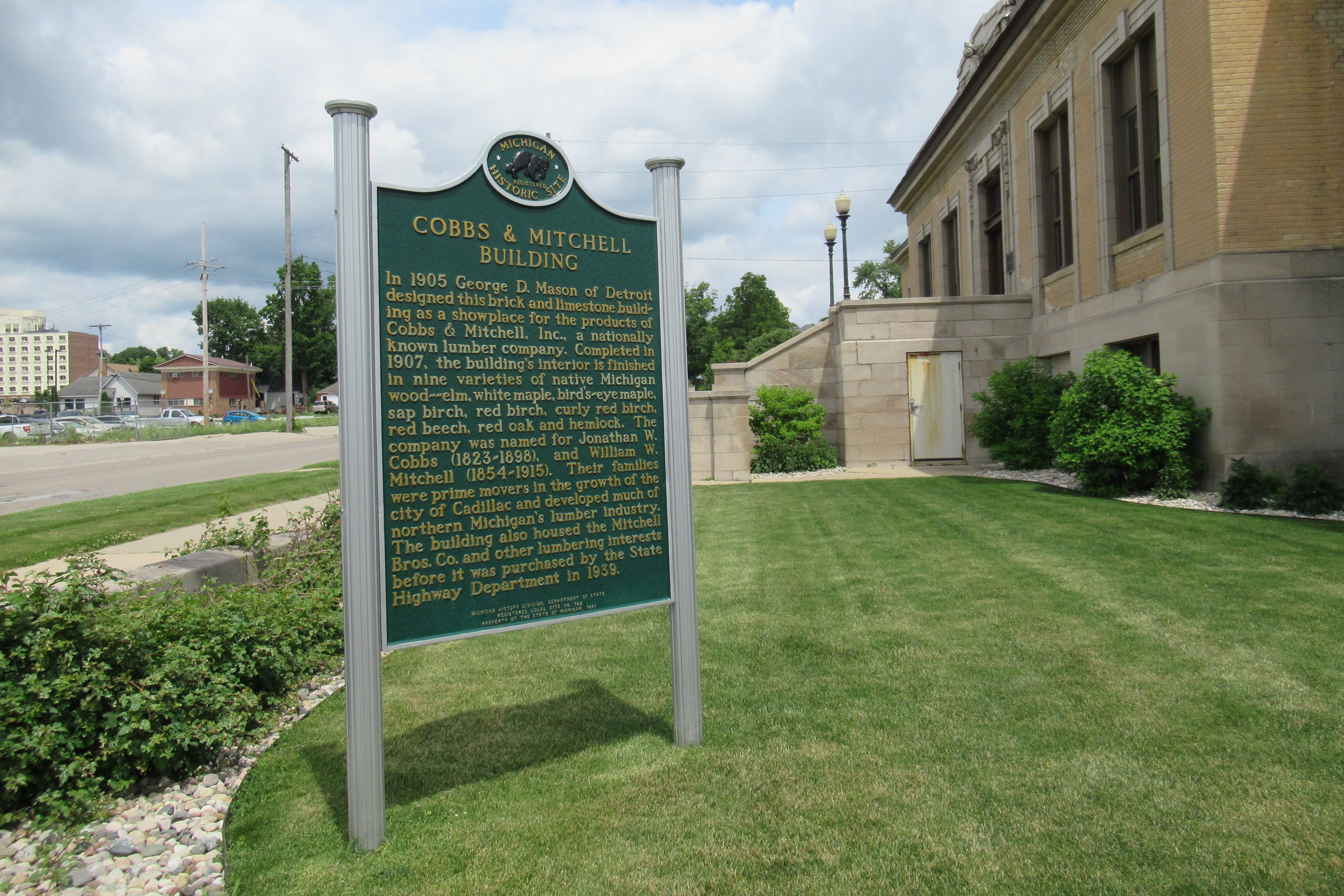
Michigan state historic marker

In 1905, Cobbs & Mitchell hired George D. Mason of Detroit to design this brick and limestone building as a showplace for their products. The building was completed in 1907, and served as the headquarters and sales offices of Cobbs & Mitchell and of Mitchell Brothers Company, with space leased to other lumbering interests and local firms. In 1938, the State Highway Department (now the Michigan Department of Transportation) purchased the building; they used it as a headquarters for planning expansion of roadways in the northern Michigan area.

The Michigan Department of Transportation used the building until 2008. In 2010, it was acquired by the city of Cadillac, which intended to promote the reuse of the property by the private sector. Later in the year, the city sold the building to Michilake Corporation, a private developer. The building has been refinished.

In April 2017, philanthropist, real estate developer and investor, Robb Munger became the owner of the Cobbs and Mitchell historical building. Robb Munger restored and updated the historical landmark. The building re-opened on July 3, 2018, to the public for an open house

== Description ==
The Cobbs & Mitchell Building is a single story Classical Revival structure built of brick and limestone with a hip roof. It is three bays wide, with a grand center entryway decorated by decorative garland molds. Limestone forms the base of the building, rising eight feet from grade level.

The interior contains 11,762 square feet (1,092.7 m^{2}) in a main floor, basement level, and unfinished attic. The building is finished throughout using nine varieties of wood native to Michigan: elm, white maple, bird's-eye maple, sap birch, red birch, curly red birch, red beech, red oak and hemlock. The original marble fireplaces, radiators, and wallpaper are intact.
