= WRCK =

WRCK may refer to:

- WRCK (AM), a radio station (1480 AM) licensed to Remsen, New York, United States
- WUTQ-FM, a radio station (100.7 FM) licensed to Utica, New York, United States, known as WRCK from December 2010 through March 2012
- WKVU, a radio station (107.3 FM) licensed to Utica, New York, United States, known as WRCK from March 1981 through December 2010
- WLS-FM, a radio station (94.7 FM) licensed to Chicago, Illinois, United States, known as WRCK from May 1980 through December 1980
- WSRU, a radio station (88.1 FM) licensed to Slippery Rock, PA, United States, known as WRCK (carrier current AM) from 1980 to November 1990.
