= WRIC =

WRIC could refer to two broadcast stations in the United States:

- WRIC-TV, a television station licensed to Petersburg, Virginia
- WRIC-FM, a radio station licensed to Richlands, Virginia
