= Old Classroom Building, Union College =

- U.S. National Register of Historic Places
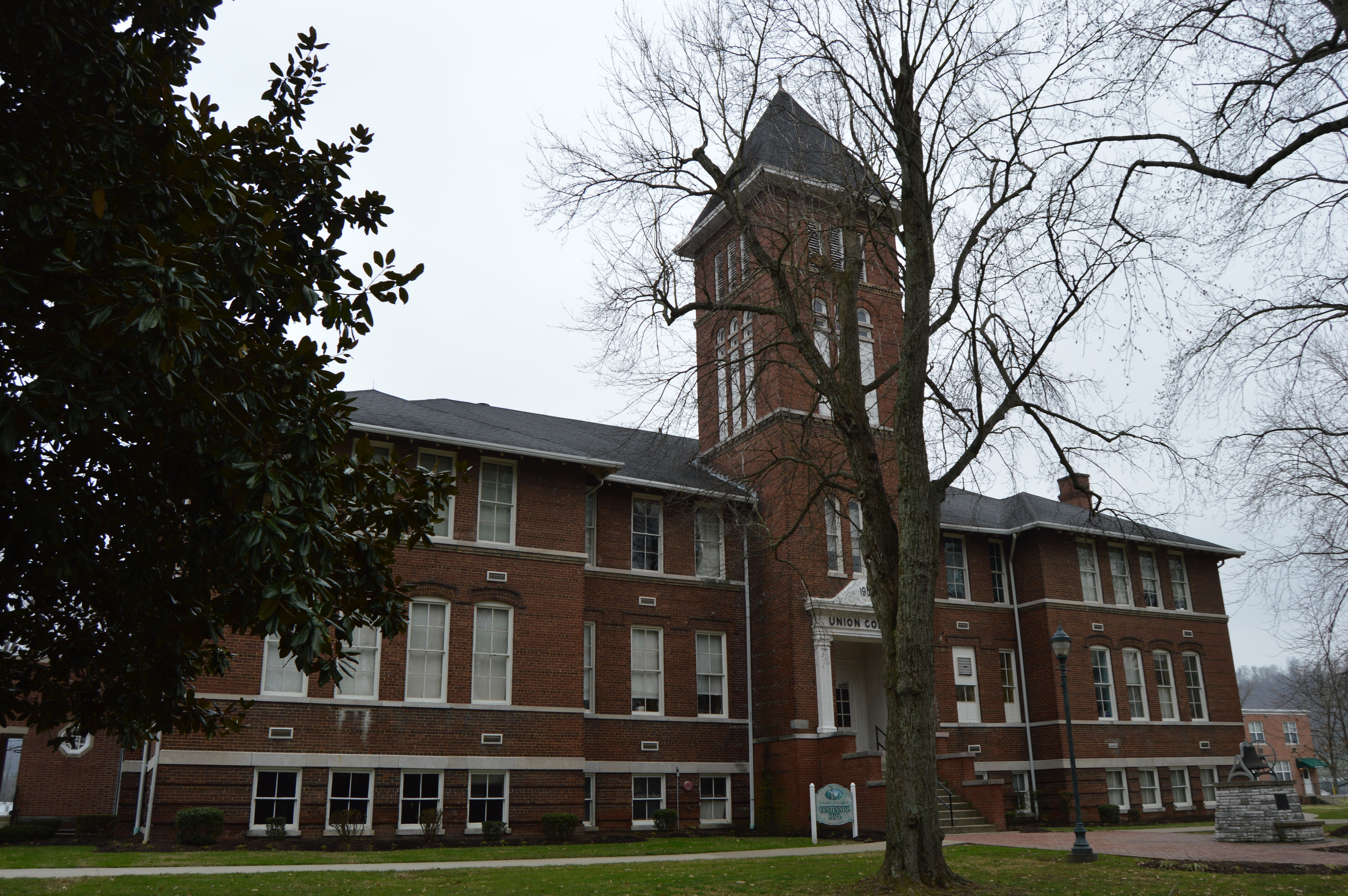

- Location within Kentucky Location within the United States
- Location: College St., Barbourville, Kentucky
- Coordinates: 36°51′14″N 83°53′18″W
- Area: 9 acres (3.6 ha)
- Built: 1907
- NRHP reference No.: 75000788
- Added to NRHP: May 30, 1975

The Old Classroom Building, Union College, located on College Street in Barbourville, Kentucky, is a historic building of Union College which was built in 1907. It was listed on the National Register of Historic Places in 1975.

A university official, in its 1974 NRHP nomination, suggests: "The design of the building as a whole by an as yet unknown architect is of somewhat anomalous stylistic character (perhaps vaguely Italian Romanesque in flavor), unassuming, but well-proportioned, and exactly calculated to fulfill the role of landmark that it does."

== See also ==
- Speed Hall (1905)
- Soldiers and Sailors Memorial Gym (1919)
