= Speed Hall =

- U.S. National Register of Historic Places
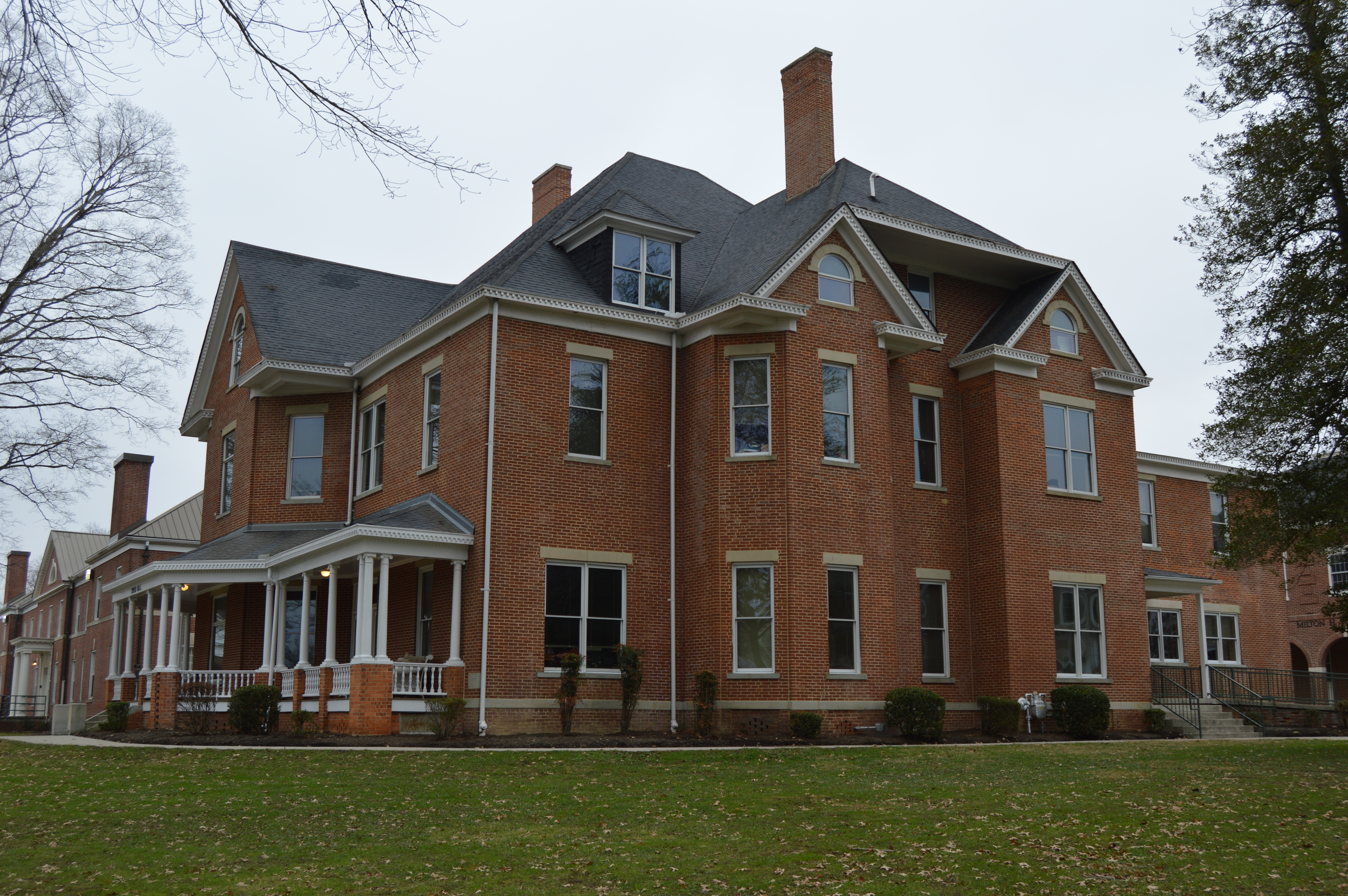

- Location within Kentucky Location within the United States
- Location: College St., Barbourville, Kentucky
- Coordinates: 36°52′15″N 83°53′20″W
- Area: 0.2 acres (0.081 ha)
- Built: 1903-05
- NRHP reference No.: 82002731
- Added to NRHP: April 29, 1982

Speed Hall, on the campus of Union College in Barbourville, Kentucky, was built during 1903–05. It was listed on the National Register of Historic Places in 1982.

It is Union College's oldest building. It served originally as the women's dormitory, until Pfeiffer Hall was opened in 1943. It was later used by the music department, by the home economics department, and for administration.

It is named for benefactor Fanny Henning Speed, of Louisville, Kentucky, who was the wife of Joshua Speed, a close friend of Abraham Lincoln. Her connection to Union College was through Dr. Daniel Stevenson, pastor of Trinity Methodist Episcopal Church in Louisville before he became president of Union College in 1886. She left half of her estate, $500,000, to the college, allowing it to embark on a major building program.

== See also ==
- Old Classroom Building (1907)
- Soldiers and Sailors Memorial Gym (1919)
