= Soldiers and Sailors Memorial Gymnasium =

- U.S. National Register of Historic Places
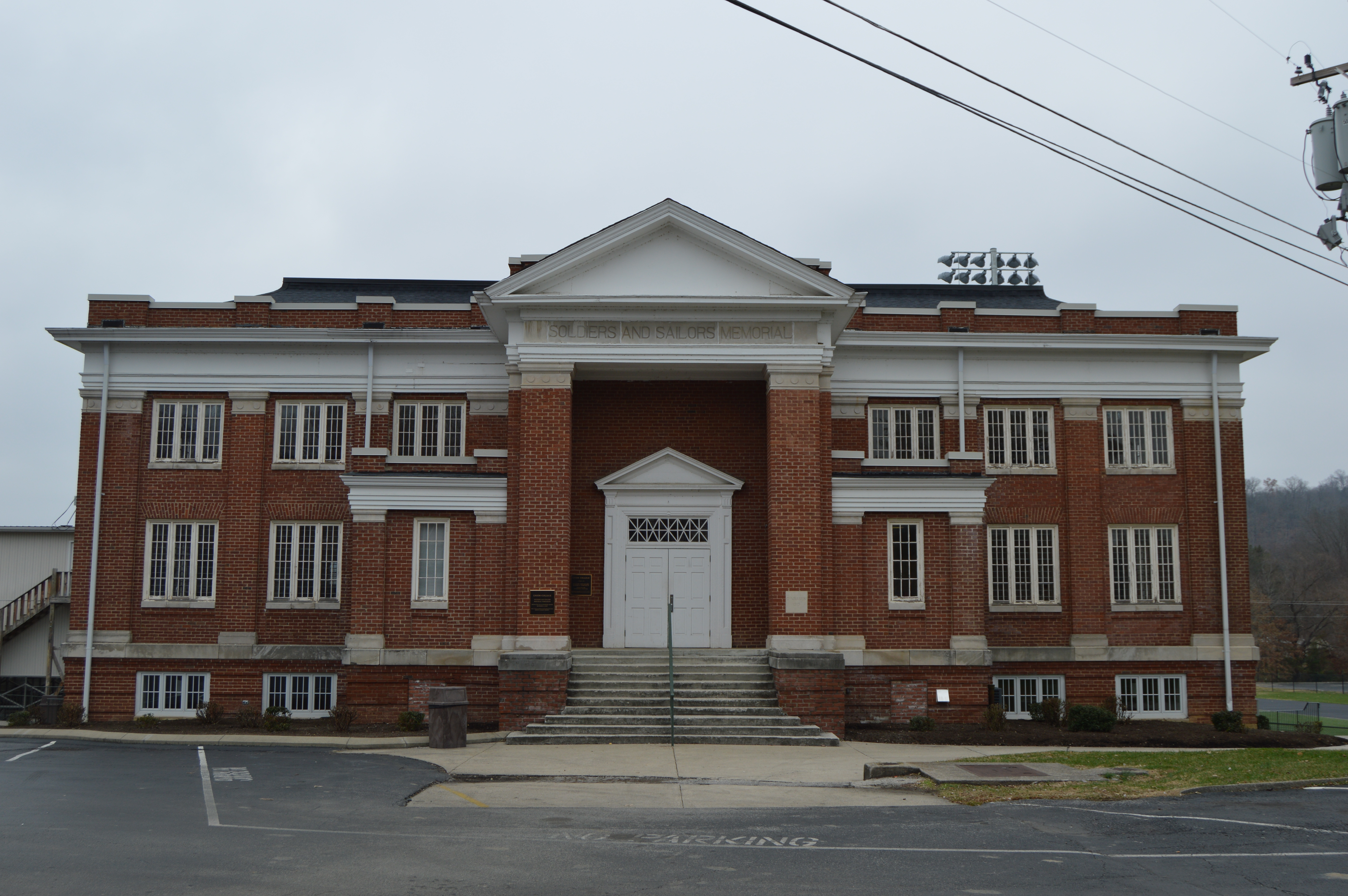

- Location within Kentucky Location within the United States
- Location: Union College Campus, Barbourville, Kentucky
- Coordinates: 36°52′15″N 83°53′15″W
- Area: 1 acre (0.40 ha)
- Built: 1919
- Architectural style: Colonial Revival
- NRHP reference No.: 84001794
- Added to NRHP: August 1, 1984

The Soldiers and Sailors Memorial Gymnasium, on the campus of Union College in Barbourville, Kentucky, was listed on the National Register of Historic Places in 1984.

It is a Colonial Revival-style building built in 1919.

It was deemed "significant as an outstanding example of Colonial Revival architecture in Southeast Kentucky and in the history of higher education in southeast, Kentucky. It is also significant because of its association with efforts in Knox County and within the Methodist Episcopal Church of Kentucky to create a fitting memorial for the Knox County and Methodist men of Kentucky who died in World War I."

== See also ==
- Speed Hall (1905)
- Old Classroom Building (1907)
