= Evans Site (New Town, North Dakota) =

- U.S. National Register of Historic Places
- Nearest city: New Town, North Dakota
- Area: 1 acre (0.40 ha)
- NRHP reference No.: 80002922
- Added to NRHP: February 8, 1980

The Evans Site (32MN301) is a Native American site located in northwestern North Dakota north of New Town. It was listed on the National Register of Historic Places in 1980. The site is a multicomponent campsite. It was surveyed by archaeologists Fred E. Schneider and Jeff Kinney in the late 1970s. Items found at the site include Avonlea projectile points and sherds of ceramics and Mortlach wares.
