= Mackie Building =

Historic commercial building in Wisconsin, United States

- U.S. National Register of Historic Places
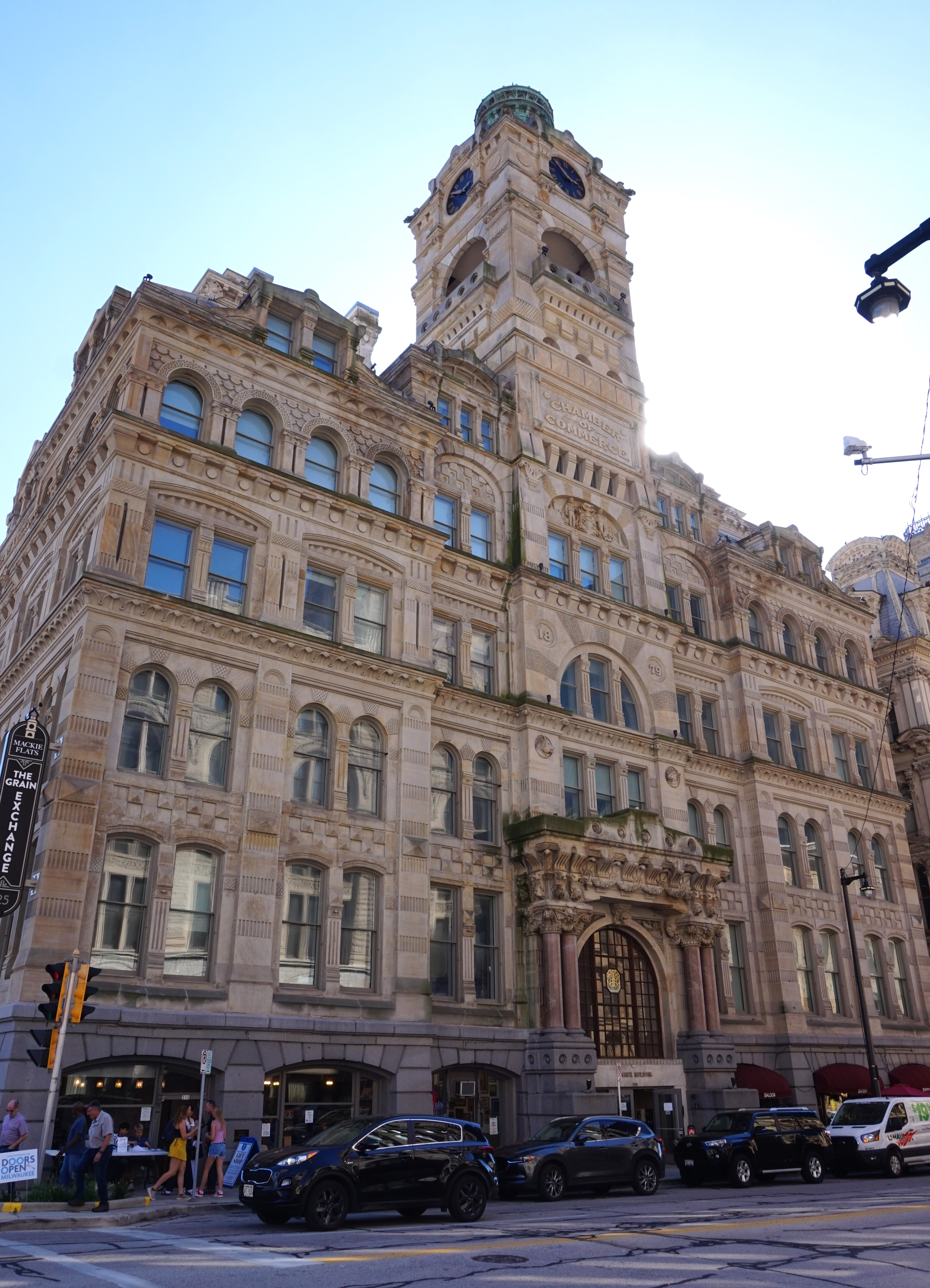
- The Mackie Building's front facade, seen from N Broadway and E Michigan St.

- Location within Wisconsin Location within the United States
- Location: 225 E. Michigan St. Milwaukee, Wisconsin
- Coordinates: 43°2′15″N 87°51′32″W
- Area: 0.5 acres (0.20 ha)
- Built: 1879
- Architect: E. Townsend Mix
- Architectural style: Victorian
- NRHP reference No.: 73000084
- Added to NRHP: April 3, 1973

The Mackie Building, formerly the Chamber of Commerce, is a historic commercial and residential building in Milwaukee, Wisconsin. Designed by E. Townsend Mix, it was built in 1879 to house the Milwaukee Grain Exchange, a commercial space to trade and export flour, wheat, and other agricultural grains. In 1973 the building was added to the National Register of Historic Places.

The building was renovated in 2016 by developer Joshua Jeffers, renovating the former office space in the upper floors into apartments, and converting the Grand Exchange Room into a private venue space.

== History ==
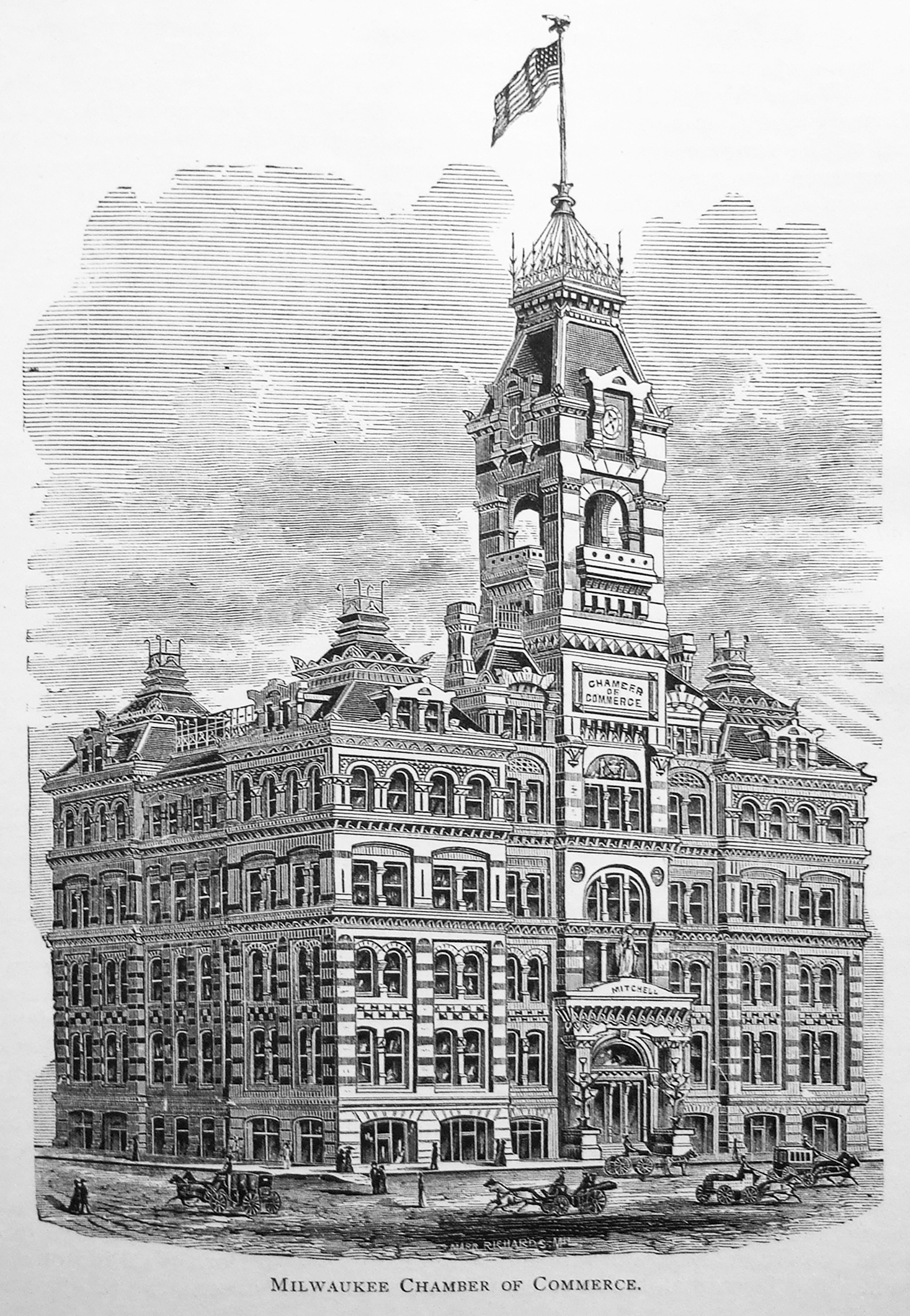
Engraving from before 1881.

First designed by architect E. Townsend Mix in a Victorian architectural style, the Mackie Building, referred to as the Chamber of Commerce, was constructed in 1879 under the financing of Scottish immigrant and U.S. Representative Alexander Mitchell to use as an investment property.

It initially housed the Milwaukee Grain Exchange, a three-story-tall trading floor in which Midwestern agricultural goods were traded, sold, auctioned, and exported throughout the world. Its walls and floors were designed in an Italian Renaissance style, with soaring ceilings, hand painted frescoes, gold leaf and over 10,000 square feet (930 m^{2}) of space. The Milwaukee Grain Exchange is closely linked with the early commercial history of Milwaukee, when for a brief time, the city was the world's largest primary wheat market for trading, exporting and inspecting grain. Milwaukee's lake port was near vast acres of wheat in the state, thus making it the most convenient and efficient location for wheat and grain trades, and invented and utilized the world's first octagonal trading pit, later being replicated in many other trade exchanges throughout the country. The grain exchange operated from 1880 to 1935.

The Mackie Building is adjacent to the Mitchell Building, another historical bank building that was also funded by Alexander Mitchell and designed by E. Townsend Mix.

== Architecture ==
The Mackie Building's rooftop tower as seen from the West, with the Mitchell Building to the right.

=== Exterior ===
The exterior remains much as Mix designed it: five and a half stories, plus a tower centered above the main entrance, reaching 160 feet above the street. The first story is clad in gray Minnesota granite. Above that, the exterior is gray sandstone and limestone. The windows are different at each story, but unified by alternating bands of color and texture. The roof is a complex of mansards, with the north entrance framed by granite columns and images of the Great Seal of Wisconsin, including the bull and bear.

The interior of the Milwaukee Grain Exchange in 2022.

=== Interior ===
The interior mirrors much of the exterior's design, with large, gray-granite and sandstone pillars and walls, stained glass, and frescoes and other detailing on the ceiling, as well as significant gold leaf adornments, metalwork, and large paintings and murals lining many of the walls.

Though the structure remains unchanged, much of the original furniture and the wheat trading pit have been removed. The office space in the floors above the Milwaukee Grain Exchange have been extensively renovated, primarily converted into numerous apartments with bathrooms, kitchens, and modern HVAC systems extending through the building.

== Gallery ==
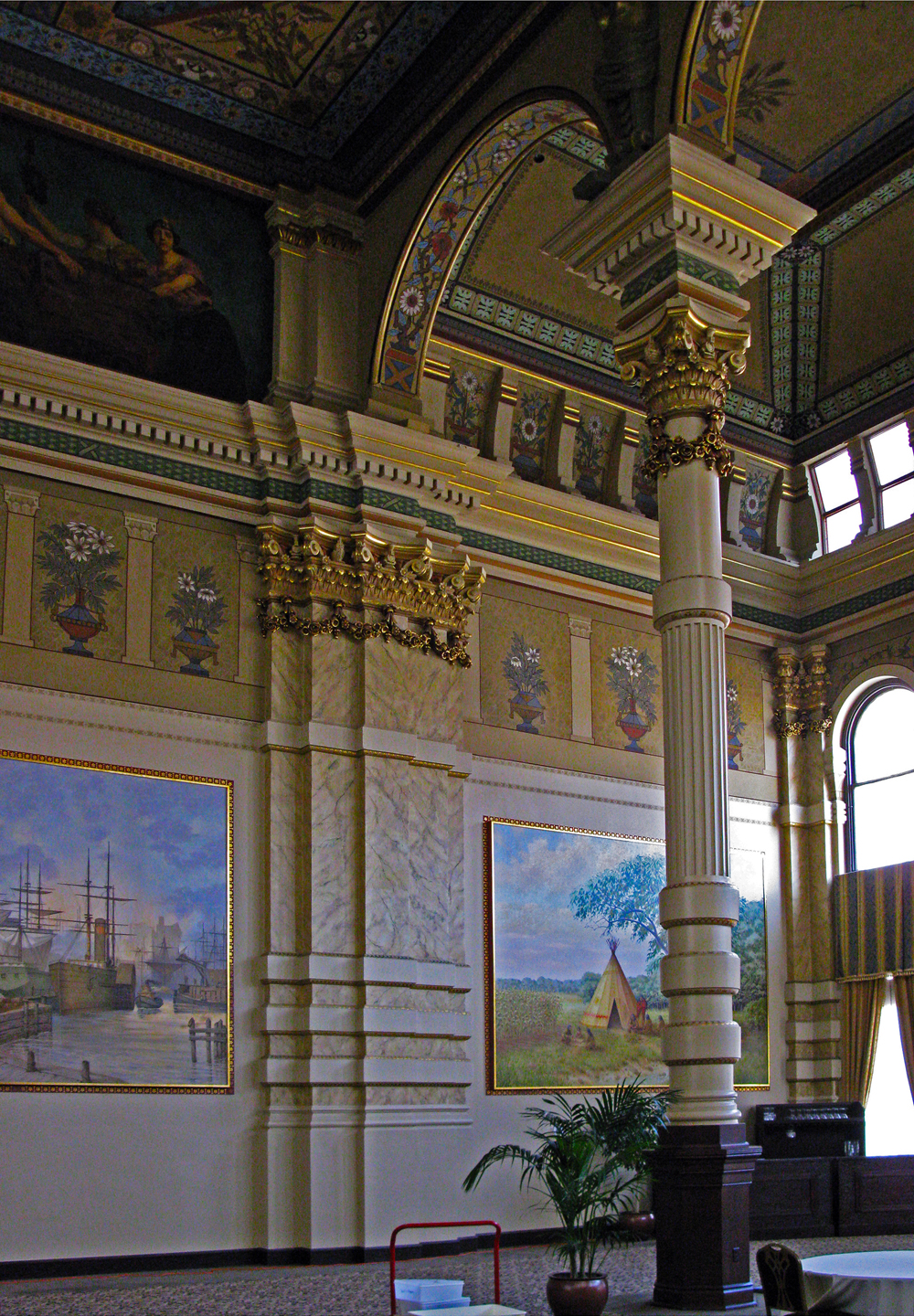
Murals, paintings, and adornments seen on the walls of the Grain Exchange.

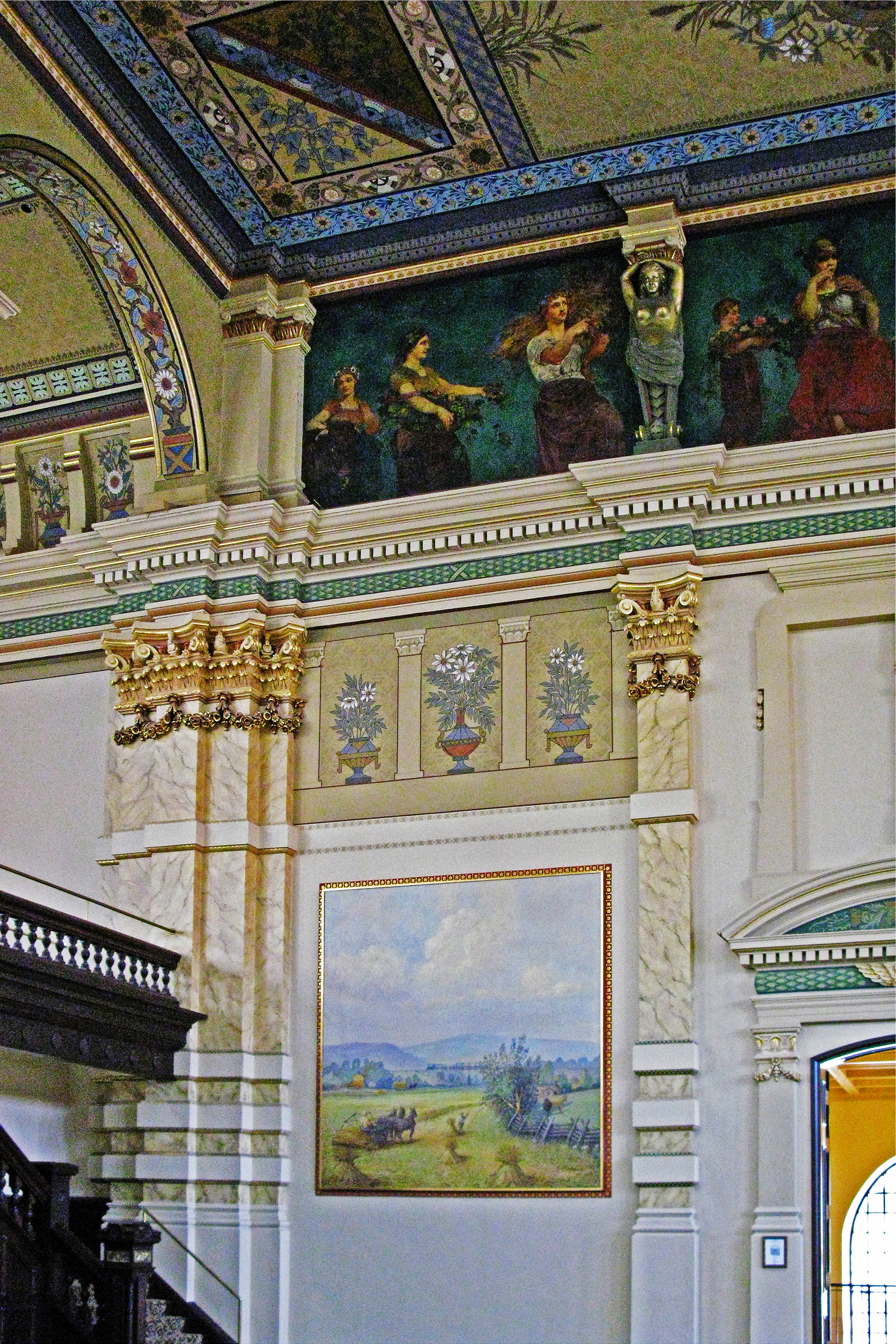
Paintings and frescoes of the opposite wall, with part of the second level's stairs seen in the bottom left.

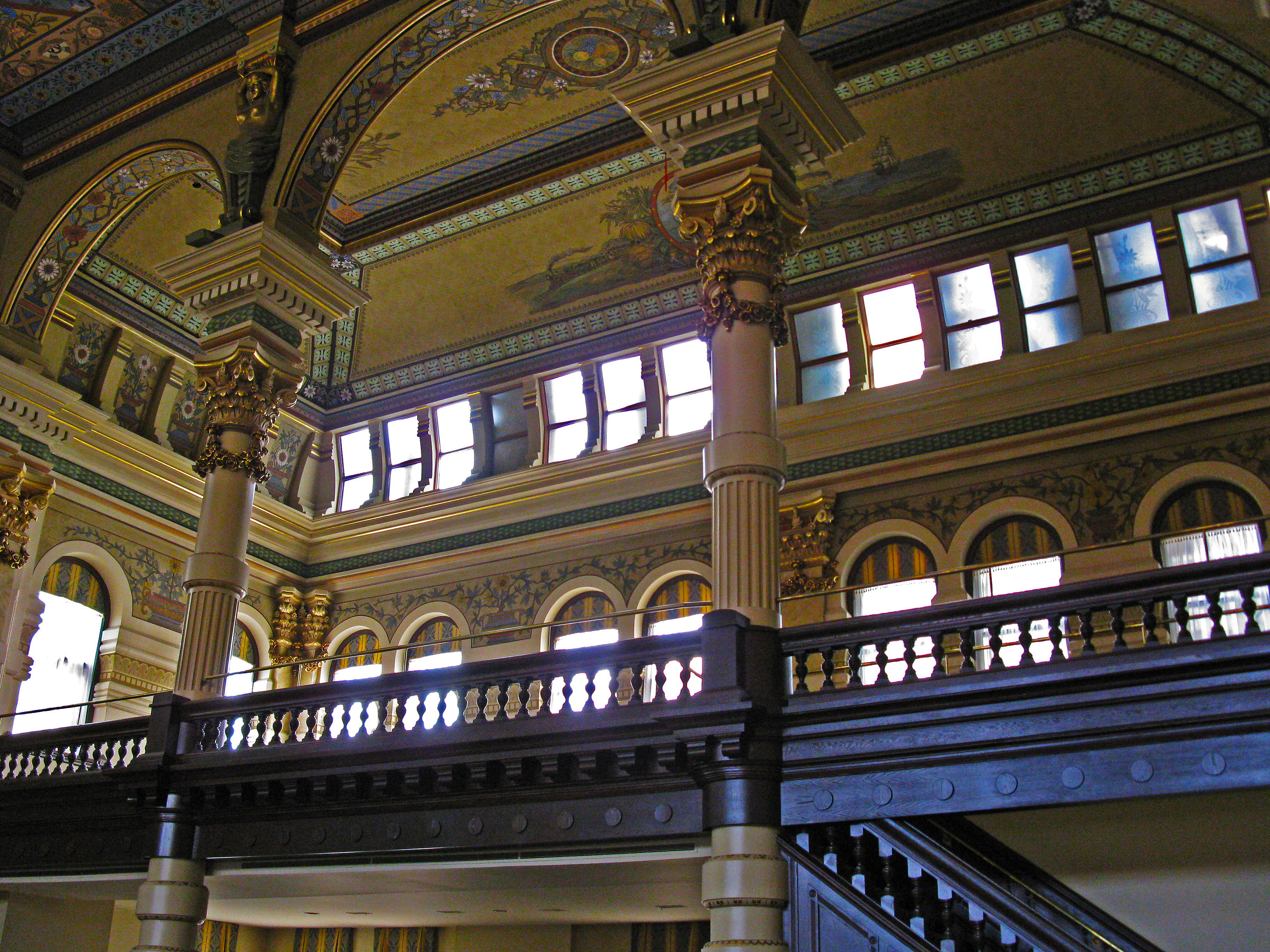
Windows and pillars of the second level of the Grain Exchange.

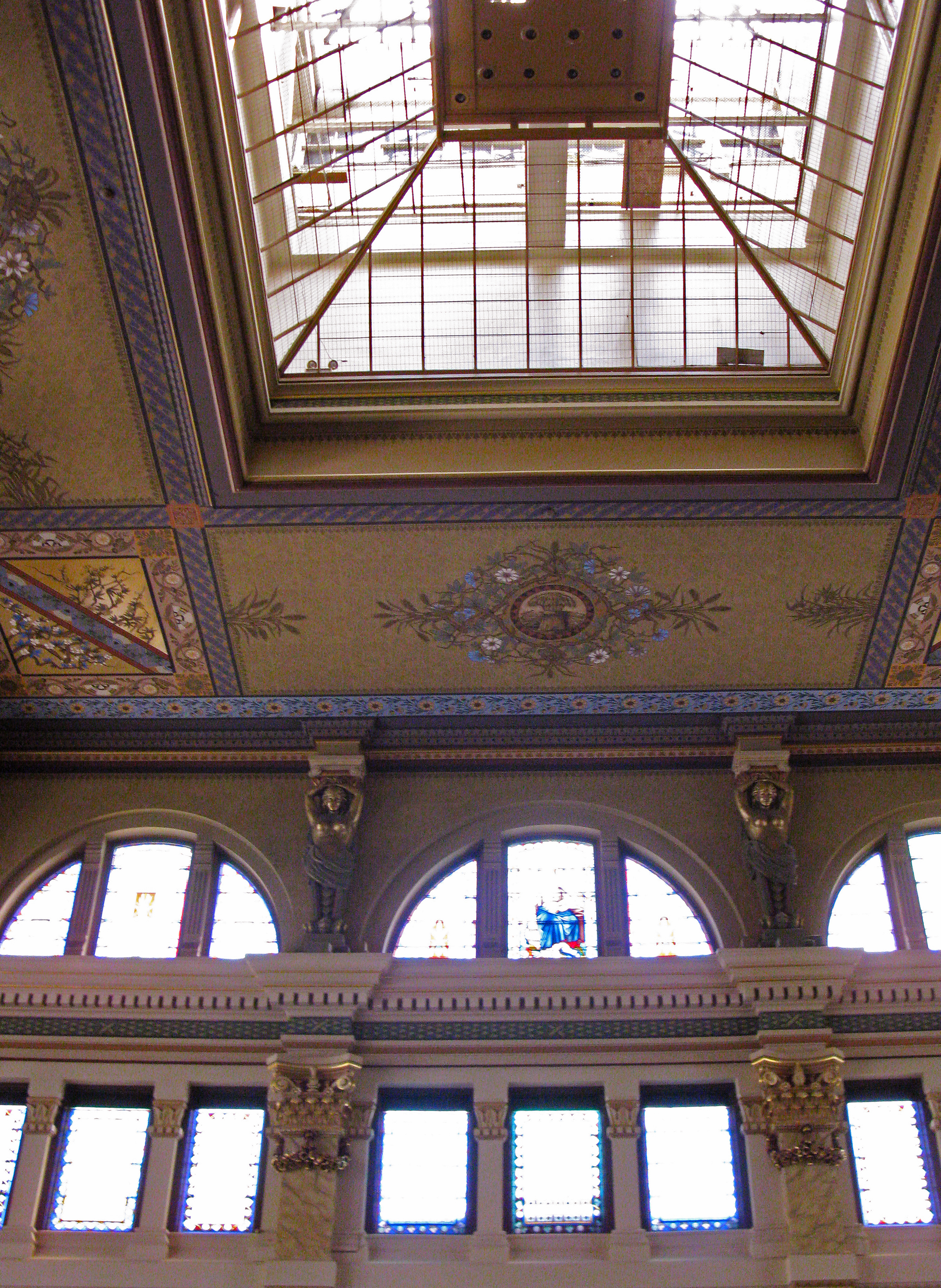
The windows, ceilings, and skylight of the Grain Exchange, with numerous gold-leaf adornments.
