= The Times-Tribune (Corbin) =

- Type: Daily newspaper
- Format: Broadsheet
- Owner: CNHI
- Publisher: Dave Eldridge
- Editor: Erin Cox
- Staff writers: Timothy Wyatt, Angela Turner, Christina Bentley
- Founded: June 17, 1882
- Headquarters: 201 North Kentucky Avenue; Corbin, Kentucky 40701; United States
- Circulation: 6,808 daily
- Website: thetimestribune.com

The Times-Tribune is a six-day (Monday through Saturday) morning daily newspaper based in Corbin, Kentucky, and covering Knox, Laurel and Whitley counties in that state. It is owned by CNHI. Founded June 17, 1882, as the weekly Corbin Enterprise, the newspaper took on the names Corbin Daily Tribune and Sunday Times when it began daily publication. Held by a succession of local owners for 100 years—Dan T. Chestnut, T.L. Metcalfe, the Price family, Fred Novels and John L. Crawford—the newspaper was sold to the Thomson Corporation in 1982 by James Crawford and J. Springer Robinson, who had owned it since 1930. American Publishing (later Hollinger International) bought it from Thomson in 1994, dealing it to the current owner, CNHI, in 1999.

== See also ==
- News Journal: weekly newspaper also based in Corbin
