= Corbin, Kentucky =

- City
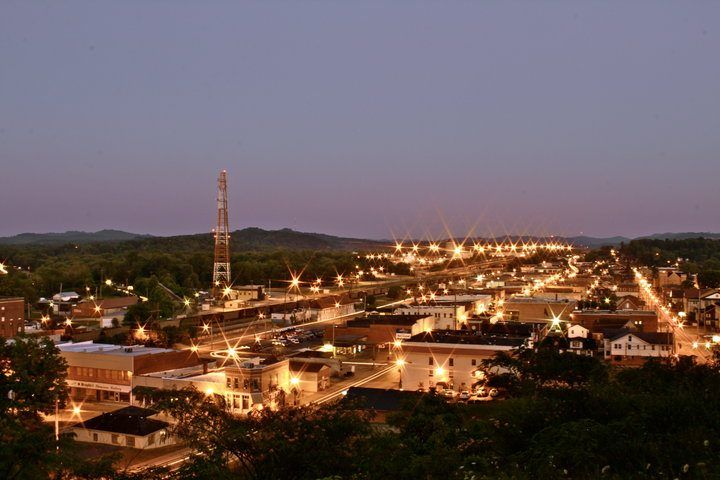
- Downtown Corbin, Kentucky, from North Kentucky Street, looking South down Main Street

- Flag Seal Logo

- Location of Corbin in Whitley County, Kentucky.
- Coordinates: 36°55′56″N 84°06′02″W
- Country: United States
- State: Kentucky
- Counties: Whitley, Knox, Laurel

Government
  - Type: Mayor-commission
  - Mayor: Suzie Razmus
  - City Manager: Marlon Sams

Area
  - Total: 7.99 sq mi (20.70 km^{2})
  - Land: 7.95 sq mi (20.59 km^{2})
  - Water: 0.042 sq mi (0.11 km^{2})
- Elevation: 1,119 ft (341 m)

Population (2020)
  - Total: 7,856
  - Estimate (2023): 9,012
  - Density: 988.4/sq mi (381.64/km^{2})
- Time zone: UTC-5 (Eastern (EST))
  - Summer (DST): UTC-4 (EDT)
- ZIP codes: 40701-40702
- Area code: 606
- FIPS code: 21-17362
- GNIS feature ID: 2404128
- Website: corbin-ky.gov

Corbin is a home rule-class city in Whitley, Knox and Laurel counties in the southeastern portion of the U.S. state of Kentucky. As of the 2020 census, the city population was 7,856.

Corbin is on Interstate 75 and US Route 25W, about halfway between Knoxville, Tennessee, and Lexington, Kentucky.

== History ==
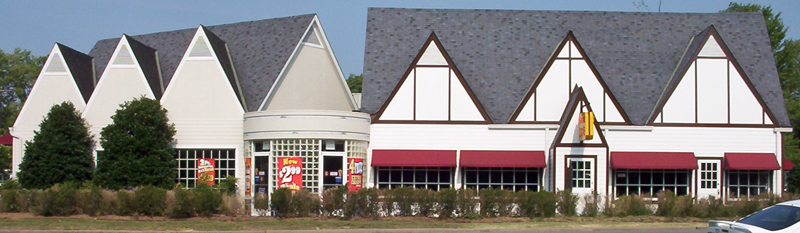
The Harland Sanders Café and Museum

The first settlement in the Corbin area was known as Lynn Camp Station. The first post office was called Cummins, for community founder Nelson Cummins. It was discovered in 1885 that both Cummins and Lynn Camp were already in use as names for Kentucky post offices, and postmaster James Eaton was asked to select another name. He chose Corbin for the Rev. James Corbin Floyd, a local minister. The town was incorporated under that name in 1905.

Corbin has a troubled racial past, including a race riot in late October 1919 in which a white mob forced nearly all the town's 200 black residents onto a freight train out of town and a sundown town policy until the late 20th century. The event is the subject of a 1991 documentary, Trouble Behind. In October 2019, city leaders marked the riot's centennial with a proclamation acknowledging the riot and former sundown town policy.

For most of its history, the urbanized areas of Corbin in Laurel County were not incorporated into the city limits due to a state law prohibiting cities from being in more than two counties. However, a 2021 change to state law allowed cities to voluntarily annex property in a third county if the city already provides public infrastructure to that property. In March 2022, the Corbin City Commission approved an annexation request for a property in Laurel County.

== Geography ==
According to the United States Census Bureau, Corbin has a total area of 7.9 mi^{2} (20 km^{2}), with only a tiny fraction of 0.044 mi^{2} (0.11 km^{2}), or 0.56%, consisting of water.

Corbin lies in the Cumberland Plateau region of Appalachia in southeastern Kentucky, along Interstate 75 and U.S. Route 25W. I-75 provides access to the city from exit 25, leading north 89 miles (143 km) to Lexington and south 86 miles (138 km) to Knoxville, Tennessee. U.S. 25W runs through the center of town, leading north 14 miles (23 km) to London (via U.S. Route 25) and south 21 miles (34 km) to Williamsburg.

The Pine Mountain Overthrust Fault, a geologic fault system several miles to the east, produces occasional tremors, the most recent in 2008.

=== Climate ===
Corbin exhibits a humid subtropical climate, typical of southeastern Kentucky. The region experiences four distinct seasons. Winters are cool to cold, with mild periods. Summers are generally hot and humid, with variable spring and fall seasons. Precipitation is common year-round but more prevalent in the summer months—the surrounding mountains somewhat moderate Corbin's climate.

Climate data for Corbin, Kentucky
Month	Jan	Feb	Mar	Apr	May	Jun	Jul	Aug	Sep	Oct	Nov	Dec	Year
Record high °F (°C)	74 (23)	81 (27)	87 (31)	90 (32)	91 (33)	106 (41)	101 (38)	102 (39)	97 (36)	92 (33)	82 (28)	78 (26)	102 (39)
Mean daily maximum °F (°C)	44 (7)	49 (9)	58 (14)	68 (20)	75 (24)	83 (28)	86 (30)	85 (29)	79 (26)	69 (21)	58 (14)	48 (9)	66.8 (19.3)
Mean daily minimum °F (°C)	25 (−4)	28 (−2)	36 (2)	43 (6)	52 (11)	61 (16)	66 (19)	64 (18)	57 (14)	44 (7)	36 (2)	29 (−2)	45 (7)
Record low °F (°C)	−25 (−32)	−11 (−24)	−12 (−24)	19 (−7)	28 (−2)	34 (1)	45 (7)	44 (7)	32 (0)	18 (−8)	2 (−17)	−17 (−27)	−25 (−32)
Average precipitation inches (mm)	4.01 (102)	3.72 (94)	4.61 (117)	4.01 (102)	4.69 (119)	4.24 (108)	4.39 (112)	3.36 (85)	3.37 (86)	2.80 (71)	3.90 (99)	4.31 (109)	47.41 (1,204)
Source: The Weather Channel.

== Demographics ==
Historical population
Census	Pop.	Note	%±
1900	1,544		—
1910	2,589		67.7%
1920	3,406		31.6%
1930	8,036		135.9%
1940	7,893		−1.8%
1950	7,744		−1.9%
1960	7,119		−8.1%
1970	7,474		5.0%
1980	8,075		8.0%
1990	7,419		−8.1%
2000	7,742		4.4%
2010	7,304		−5.7%
2020	7,856		7.6%
2024 (est.)	7,891		0.4%
U.S. Decennial Census

Corbin is near the center of the Corbin, Kentucky micropolitan area, whose current boundaries were established in 2023 by the U.S. Office of Management and Budget in coordination with the United States Census Bureau. Previously, the London micropolitan area had consisted solely of Laurel County, while the Whitley County portion of Corbin was the principal city of its own micropolitan area that consisted solely of that county. Both entities were in turn the components of a statistical entity officially known as the "Corbin–London, KY Combined Statistical Area". The CSA had a combined population of 94,486 at the 2010 census. The Knox County portion of Corbin was outside the former Corbin–London statistical area but is now included in the redefined London micropolitan area.

=== 2020 census ===
As of the 2020 census, Corbin had a population of 7,856. The median age was 40.0 years. 23.0% of residents were under the age of 18 and 21.2% of residents were 65 years of age or older. For every 100 females there were 84.7 males, and for every 100 females age 18 and over there were 78.6 males age 18 and over.

99.3% of residents lived in urban areas, while 0.7% lived in rural areas.

There were 3,205 households in Corbin, of which 30.5% had children under the age of 18 living in them. Of all households, 37.2% were married-couple households, 18.9% were households with a male householder and no spouse or partner present, and 36.3% were households with a female householder and no spouse or partner present. About 35.5% of all households were made up of individuals and 15.9% had someone living alone who was 65 years of age or older.

There were 3,720 housing units, of which 13.8% were vacant. The homeowner vacancy rate was 2.6% and the rental vacancy rate was 10.6%.

Racial composition as of the 2020 census
Race	Number	Percent
White	7,320	93.2%
Black or African American	44	0.6%
American Indian and Alaska Native	21	0.3%
Asian	66	0.8%
Native Hawaiian and Other Pacific Islander	0	0.0%
Some other race	93	1.2%
Two or more races	312	4.0%
Hispanic or Latino (of any race)	194	2.5%

=== 2010 census ===
As of the 2010 census there were 7,304 people, 3,093 households, and 1,903 families residing in the city. The population density was 920.1 inhabitants per square mile (355.3/km^{2}). There were 3,507 housing units at an average density of 441.8 units per square mile (170.6 units/km^{2}). The racial makeup of the city was 97.41% White (96.69% non-Hispanic), 0.26% African American, 0.31% Native American or Alaska Native, 0.64% Asian, 0.26% from other races, and 1.11% from two or more races. No Pacific Islanders lived in the city in 2010. Hispanics or Latinos of any race were 1.19% of the population.

There were 3,093 households, out of which 29.8% had children under the age of 18 living with them, 41.3% were married couples living together, 16.0% had a female householder with no husband present, 4.2% had a male householder with no wife present, and 38.5% were non-families. 34.8% of all households were made up of individuals, and 16.3% had someone living alone who was 65 years of age or older. The average household size was 2.27, and the average family size was 2.91.

The age distribution was 22.5% under 18, 8.5% from 18 to 24, 22.9% from 25 to 44, 25.3% from 45 to 64, and 20.8% who were 65 or older. The median age was 41.6 years. For every 100 females, there were 80.2 males. For every 100 females age 18 and over, there were 75.8 males.

=== Income and poverty ===
Income data from the 2010 Census for Kentucky locations have not yet been released. As of the 2000 Census, the median income for a household in the city was $22,203. The median income for a family was $32,784. Males had a median income of $27,323 versus $17,568 for females. The per capita income for the city was $14,200. About 15.5% of families and 21.0% of the population were below the poverty line, including 24.0% of those under age 18 and 16.4% of those age 65 or over.

== Economy ==
Initially provided by L&N Railroad, rail transport was the backbone of the local economy in the first half of the 20th century. While the railroad (presently CSX) continues to play an important role, the decline of the rail industry in the latter half of the 20th century, as well as the loss of some manufacturing jobs, has prompted the community to begin diversifying its economy.

== Culture ==
Each year in early August, Corbin hosts a festival called NIBROC (Corbin spelled backward) featuring open-air concerts, carnival attractions, a beauty pageant, parade, and other events. The festival is featured, if anachronistically, in the play Last Train to Nibroc by Arlene Hutton. (Though the play is set in the 1940s, the festival itself only dates to 1952.) NIBROC often features free performances by popular musical acts such as Blake Shelton,38 Special, Foghat, Joan Jett and the Blackhearts, Kansas, The Marshall Tucker Band, Percy Sledge, Rick Springfield, Starship, Styx and The Turtles. In episode 10 of the American reality-documentary television series On the Road with Austin & Santino on Lifetime entitled "We Love a Parade", the fashion designers visit Corbin to custom-design a dress for a local woman participating in the NIBROC parade.

Despite being in dry counties (Knox and Whitley), like many southern cities, the city of Corbin allows full retail alcohol sales, following a successful local option election on February 14, 2012. The city had previously voted in 2004 to allow sales of alcohol by the drink in larger restaurants.

Corbin has an association with Kentucky Fried Chicken, having been the location of the chain's first restaurant, opened in 1930. Corbin appears in the animated cartoon South Park's episode "Medicinal Fried Chicken", wherein Eric Cartman visits the town to meet with Harland Sanders. Corbin is depicted as located in a lush rain forest in a parody of the 1983 film Scarface, wherein Tony Montana and Omar Suarez visit Bolivia to meet with a drug kingpin.

== Government ==
Corbin is governed by a mayor and city commission and a city manager who runs the departments' day-to-day operations. Currently, Marlon Sams is the city manager. Since it does not have a mayor/alderman form of government, Corbin is considered home rule-class under Kentucky's city classification system that took effect in 2015. Susie Razmus is the current mayor. Trent Knuckles, David Grigsby Hart, Ed Tye, and Andrew Pennington are its four current commissioners.

Corbin is one of the few cities in Kentucky that lie in two counties—Whitley and Knox. Many built-up areas in neighboring Laurel County have a Corbin postal address but lie outside the city limits. This arrangement has created some problems with taxes and census records. The city receives a portion of the occupational tax collected in Whitley County. However, Knox County has refused to give Corbin any tax collected there. On March 10, 2008, the City Commission voted to file a lawsuit against Knox County to receive a portion of the tax collected within city limits. On May 23, 2014, the Kentucky Court of Appeals ruled that the "Stivers amendment", passed as part of KY HB 499 "Tax Amnesty" legislation in 2012, did not violate the state's constitution. The measure essentially canceled the effect of court rulings that would have enabled Corbin to keep all the revenue from the tax generated inside the city limits. Corbin's mayor, Willard McBurney, vowed to carry the fight to the state Supreme Court.

Corbin is in Kentucky's 5th congressional district.

== Education ==
Corbin, like many communities of its size in southeastern Kentucky, has an independent school system (in Kentucky, a public school system not affiliated with a county; most such districts are associated with individual cities). The district was officially established in 1916, and the 100th class graduated in 2017. The Corbin Independent School District includes:

- Corbin Preschool Center
- Corbin Primary (grades K-3)
- Corbin Elementary (grades 4–5) (Currently housed by the newest building in the district after a complete remodeling of the former Middle School)
- Corbin Middle (grades 6–8)
- Corbin High (grades 9–12) (Currently housed by the oldest building in the district)
- Corbin School Of Innovation

The community and school system place considerable emphasis on the success of academics and high school athletic teams. Corbin "Redhound" sports are important social events within the community.

In 2004, Eastern Kentucky University opened an extension campus in Corbin.

The annual Battle for the Brass Lantern, a college football rivalry game between the University of the Cumberlands and Union Commonwealth University (formerly Union College), was played at Corbin High School's stadium in 2006 and 2007, as a neutral field roughly equidistant from the two campuses. The rivalry dates to 1905.

Corbin was formerly home to Saint Camillus Academy, a private pre-K-8 Catholic school affiliated with the Diocese of Lexington. Established in 1908 by the Sisters of Divine Providence, the school has been successful as both a boarding school for national and international students and as a Montessori school. Its original schoolhouse, built in 1913, was demolished in summer 2008. The new school building is still situated atop a prominent hill overlooking the town, providing a striking backdrop to the streets of downtown Corbin. The school closed in 2012 after 99 years of service. The property and grounds of the school were sold to the Corbin School System to house a new Corbin Middle School due to the rapidly increasing student population and age of the current building.

Corbin has a lending library, the Corbin Public Library.

== Transportation ==
Corbin straddles Interstate 75 and U.S. Highway 25 (which splits into US 25E and US 25W in North Corbin). CSX Transportation provides railroad freight service through Corbin.

== Sites of interest ==
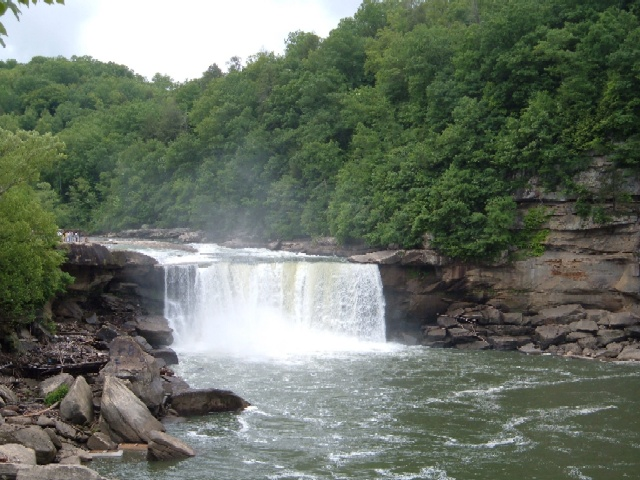
Cumberland Falls, 2005

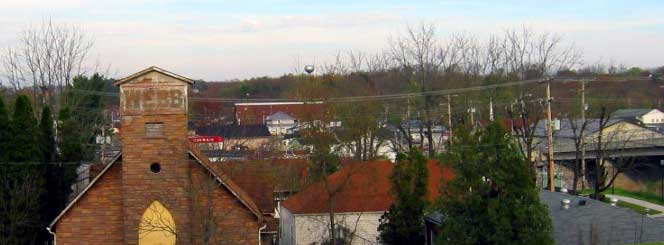
Corbin, Kentucky skyline, 2006

- Cumberland Falls State Resort Park, the site of a waterfall, one of the few in the Western Hemisphere that regularly produces a moonbow, is 19 miles (31 km) to the southwest.
- Harland Sanders Café and Museum, the birthplace of Kentucky Fried Chicken (though not sold as the KFC/Kentucky Fried Chicken brand at the time), is located in North Corbin. The restaurant and accompanying museum are popular with tour groups traveling along Interstate 75.
- The Arena at the Southeastern Kentucky Ag and Expo Complex, a multi-purpose venue on top of a hill across from the Baptist Regional Medical Center, sits above the Corbin Center. This multi-purpose education center also houses the Corbin Tourism office.
- Nearby Laurel River Lake, created by the U.S. Army Corps of Engineers in 1974, is a popular recreational site for boating, fishing, water skiing, and scuba diving.
- Cumberland Gap and Cumberland Gap National Historical Park are about 50 miles (80 km) south of Corbin on U.S. Highway 25E at the Tennessee border.

== Media ==
=== Newspapers ===
- The Times-Tribune, a Tuesday And Thursday newspaper
- News Journal, weekly newspaper covering both Corbin (headquarters) and the Whitley County, Kentucky, area including Williamsburg

=== Radio ===
- WCTT AM 680 (Great 68; Oldies)
- WKDP AM 1330
- WEKF FM 88.5 (Eastern Ky Univ. affiliate)
- WVCT FM 91.5 (Gospel Eagle; Southern Gospel)
- WKDP FM 99.5 (Country)
- WCTT FM 107.3 (T-107; Adult Contemporary)
- WRHR-LPFM 95.3 (also known as Corbin's Own Red 95.3; broadcast by Corbin High School)

=== TV ===
- WVTN (Channel 22 Time Warner Cable) - religious; broadcast from Corbin with local and regional churches and religious syndicated programs part of the radio station WVCT 91.5
- RBS (Channel 18 Time Warner Cable) - Corbin school district information broadcasting the WRHR radio station Red 95.3
- YHC (Channel 21 on Time Warner Cable) - broadcasts local and regional business infomercials and runs on-screen ads playing Contemporary Christian Music

== Notable people ==
- Rodger Bird, football player
- Ensley A. Carpenter, doctor, once lived in Corbin, for whom the town of Carpenter, Kentucky was named
- Debbie Dean, pop singer, first white solo artist signed to Motown Records
- Richie Farmer, politician and former basketball player
- Silas House, writer
- Roy Kidd, retired football coach, member of the College Football Hall of Fame, former head coach of Eastern Kentucky University football; was born and raised here
- Arthur Lake, actor who played Dagwood Bumstead in the Blondie movies
- Ronni Lundy, food and music writer, cookbook author, and Southern Foodways Alliance Lifetime Achievement Award winner
- George McAfee, WW2 Veteran, football player, NFL Hall of Fame inductee.
- Dan Neal, football player
- Colonel Harland Sanders, entrepreneur and founder of Kentucky Fried Chicken restaurant chain
- Frank Selvy, basketball player
- B. F. Shelton, old-timey banjo player
- Jarrett Stidham, quarterback for Baylor University, Auburn University in college and the New England Patriots and Denver Broncos in the NFL
- Trent Taylor, NFL wide receiver for the San Francisco 49ers and Cincinnati Bengals, in college for Louisiana Tech, lived in Corbin as a child, from age 2 through the end of second grade
- Mabel Martin Wyrick, writer
- Mary Weddle, professional baseball player

== See also ==
- List of sundown towns in the United States
