= National Register of Historic Places listings in Hamblen County, Tennessee =

Location of Hamblen County in Tennessee

This is a list of the National Register of Historic Places listings in Hamblen County, Tennessee.

This is intended to be a complete list of the properties and districts on the National Register of Historic Places in Hamblen County, Tennessee, United States. Latitude and longitude coordinates are provided for many National Register properties and districts; these locations may be seen together in a map.

There are 15 properties and districts listed on the National Register in the county, and one former listing.

See also National Register of Historic Places listings in Jefferson County, Tennessee for additional properties in White Pine, a city that spans the county line.

Contents: Counties in Tennessee
Anderson – Bedford – Benton – Bledsoe – Blount – Bradley – Campbell – Cannon – Carroll – Carter – Cheatham – Chester – Claiborne – Clay – Cocke – Coffee – Crockett – Cumberland – Davidson – Decatur – DeKalb – Dickson – Dyer – Fayette – Fentress – Franklin – Gibson – Giles – Grainger – Greene – Grundy – Hamblen – Hamilton – Hancock – Hardeman – Hardin – Hawkins – Haywood – Henderson – Henry – Hickman – Houston – Humphreys – Jackson – Jefferson – Johnson – Knox – Lake – Lauderdale – Lawrence – Lewis – Lincoln – Loudon – Macon – Madison – Marion – Marshall – Maury – McMinn – McNairy – Meigs – Monroe – Montgomery – Moore – Morgan – Obion – Overton – Perry – Pickett – Polk – Putnam – Rhea – Roane – Robertson – Rutherford – Scott – Sequatchie – Sevier – Shelby – Smith – Stewart – Sullivan – Sumner – Tipton – Trousdale – Unicoi – Union – Van Buren – Warren – Washington – Wayne – Weakley – White – Williamson – Wilson

This National Park Service list is complete through NPS recent listings posted October 23, 2026.

== Current listings ==
	Name on the Register	Image	Date listed	Location	City or town	Description
1	Barton Springs	Barton Springs	May 22, 1978 (#78002594)	3 miles (4.8 km) east of Morristown; 36°14′14″N 83°14′04″W	Morristown	
2	Bethel Methodist Church	Bethel Methodist Church	March 28, 2018 (#100002260)	703 N. Cumberland St. 36°13′07″N 83°17′43″W	Morristown	
3	Bethesda Presbyterian Church	Bethesda Presbyterian Church	April 11, 1973 (#73001771)	About 2 miles southwest of Russellville off U.S. Route 11E; 36°14′51″N 83°13′40″W	Russellville	
4	Crockett Tavern Museum	Crockett Tavern Museum	December 18, 2013 (#13000948)	2002 Morningside Dr. 36°13′17″N 83°16′03″W	Morristown	
5	Hamblen County Courthouse	Hamblen County Courthouse	April 13, 1973 (#73001770)	511 W. 2nd N. St. 36°12′44″N 83°17′55″W	Morristown	
6	Leeper Farm	Leeper Farm	March 21, 2007 (#07000174)	5878 Leepers Ferry Rd. 36°07′27″N 83°15′09″W	White Pine	
7	Morristown Main Street Historic District	Morristown Main Street Historic District	March 22, 2016 (#16000120)	101-119 E. Main, 200-243 W. Main, 113-133, 118-134 N. Henry, 111-121 N. Cumberland, 110-128 S. Cumberland Sts. 36°12′49″N 83°17′35″W	Morristown	
8	Phillips House	Phillips House	April 4, 1996 (#96000384)	307 E. 2nd N. St. 36°13′00″N 83°17′28″W	Morristown	
9	Riggs House		October 27, 2026 (#100013583)	3496 Sulphur Springs Road; 36°10′06″N 83°17′35″W	Morristown vicinity	
10	Rose School	Rose School	October 18, 1976 (#76001778)	Jackson and W. 2nd N. Sts. 36°12′47″N 83°17′55″W	Morristown	
11	Rural Mount	Rural Mount	July 30, 1975 (#75001757)	8 miles southeast of Morristown off State Route 160; 36°08′44″N 83°11′23″W	Morristown	Built by Alexander Outlaw for his son-in-law, Joseph Hamilton
12	St. Paul Presbyterian Church	St. Paul Presbyterian Church	August 10, 1979 (#79002434)	West of Lowland; 36°09′42″N 83°13′33″W	Lowland	
13	Southern Bell Telephone and Telegraph Building	Southern Bell Telephone and Telegraph Building	March 10, 2025 (#100011502)	203 West 2nd North Street; 36°12′52″N 83°17′43″W	Morristown	
14	U.S. Post Office	U.S. Post Office	April 25, 1983 (#83003037)	134 N. Henry St. 36°12′49″N 83°17′40″W	Morristown	
15	Watkins-Witt House	Watkins-Witt House	January 31, 1991 (#90001752)	6622 W. Andrew Johnson Highway; 36°10′09″N 83°24′23″W	Talbott	

== Former listings ==
	Name on the Register	Image	Date listed	Date removed	Location	City or town	Description
1	Morristown College Historic District	Morristown College Historic District	September 15, 1983 (#83003036)	June 26, 2017	417 N. James St. 36°13′16″N 83°17′37″W	Morristown	Fell into disrepair and demolished by the City of Morristown in late 2016 - early 2017 for new city park

== See also ==
- List of National Historic Landmarks in Tennessee
- National Register of Historic Places listings in Tennessee
