= Morristown Regional Airport =

Public airport serving Morristown, Tennessee

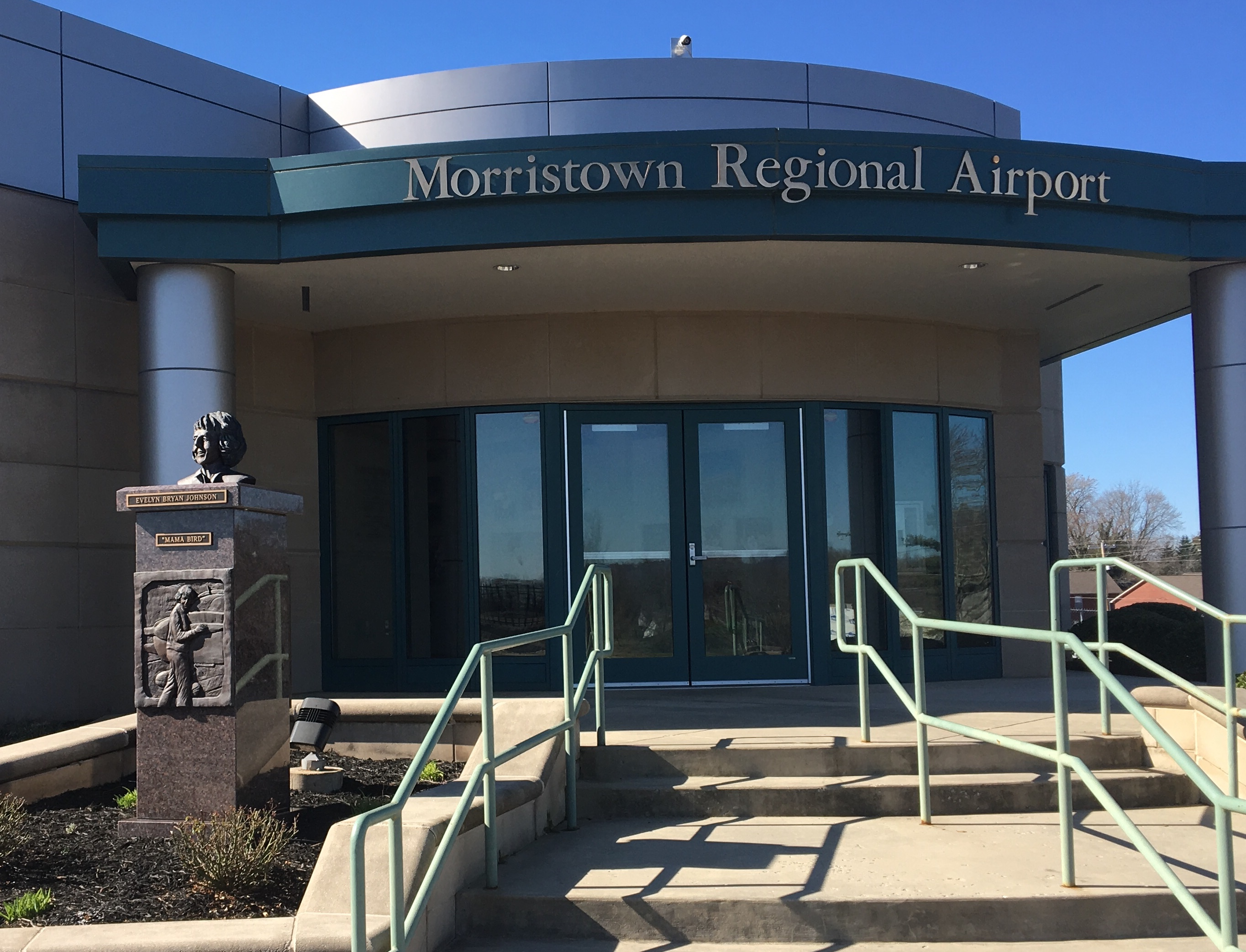
- The Evelyn Bryan Johnson Terminal at Morristown Regional Airport
- IATA: MOR; ICAO: KMOR; FAA LID: MOR

Summary
- Airport type: Public
- Owner: City of Morristown
- Serves: Morristown, Tennessee
- Elevation AMSL: 1,313 ft / 400 m
- Coordinates: 36°10′42″N 83°22′38″W
- Website: www.mymorristown.com

Map
- Location of airport in Tennessee MOR (the United States)

Runways
Direction	Length		Surface
Direction	ft	m	Surface
5/23	5,717	1,743	Asphalt

Statistics (2018)
- Aircraft operations: 49,500
- Based aircraft: 33
- Source: Federal Aviation Administration

Morristown Regional Airport (IATA: MOR, ICAO: KMOR, FAA LID: MOR) (formerly called Moore–Murrell Airport) is a city-owned public-use airport located four nautical miles (7 km) southwest of the central business district of Morristown, a city in Hamblen County, Tennessee, United States. It was opened in 1953.

This airport is included in the FAA's National Plan of Integrated Airport Systems for 2009–2013, which categorized it as a general aviation facility.

== History ==
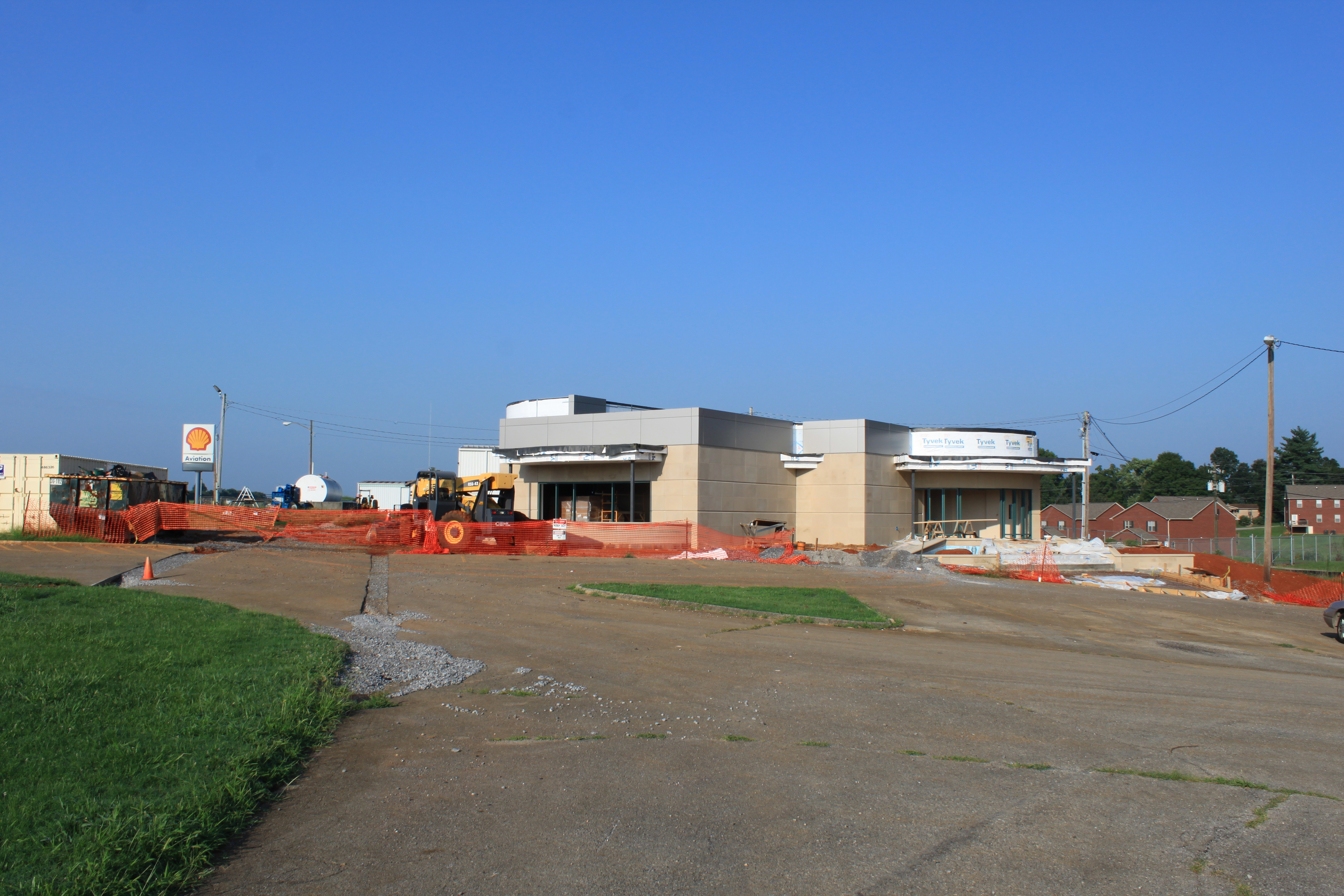
New terminal under construction

An office structure was constructed in 1953 along with a grass strip and maintenance hangar. In 1958, the first paved runway was completed. In 1968, the first professional terminal was dedicated. The original airport terminal was demolished on April 28, 2009. A new, more modern terminal opened in 2010 and was named Eyelyn Bryan Johnson Terminal for its longtime manager, Evelyn Bryan Johnson.

Southern Airways served the airport in the early 1960s with flights to/from Knoxville and Tri-City airports.

A marker dedicating the field to Rev. Melville M. Murrell, who patented "The American Flying Machine" in 1877. Murrell was born within sight of the city's new airport.

== Facilities and aircraft ==
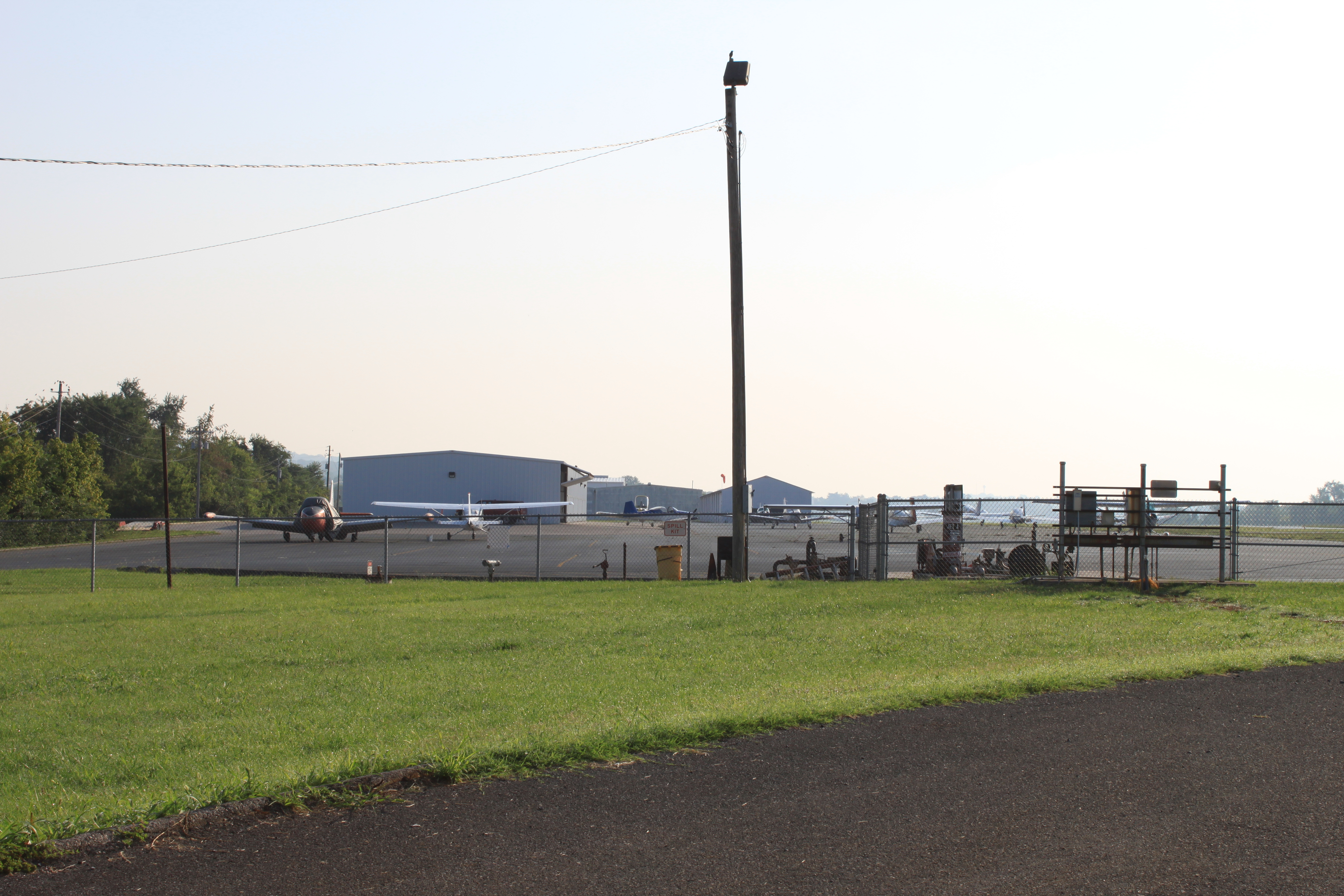
Planes on tarmac area

Morristown Regional Airport covers an area of 160 acres (65 ha) at an elevation of 1,313 feet (400 m) above mean sea level. It has one runway designated 5/23 with an asphalt surface measuring 5,717 by 100 feet (1,743 x 30 m).

For the 12-month period ending October 22, 2009, the airport had 46,000 aircraft operations, an average of 126 per day: 95% general aviation, 4% air taxi, and 1% military. At that time there were 40 aircraft based at this airport: 67.5% single-engine, 25% multi-engine, 5% jet and 2.5% helicopter.

For the 12-month period ending May 25, 2018, the airport had 49,500 aircraft operations, an average of 136 per day: 97% general aviation, 2% air taxi, and 1% military. At that time there were 33 aircraft based at this airport: 60.6% single-engine, 21.2% multi-engine, 12.1% jet, 3% helicopter, and 3% ultralight.

Also on site is Tennessee College of Applied Technology's Aviation Maintenance campus, occupying the terminal building and adjacent hangar.

== See also ==
- List of airports in Tennessee
