= Gideon Morris =

American settler

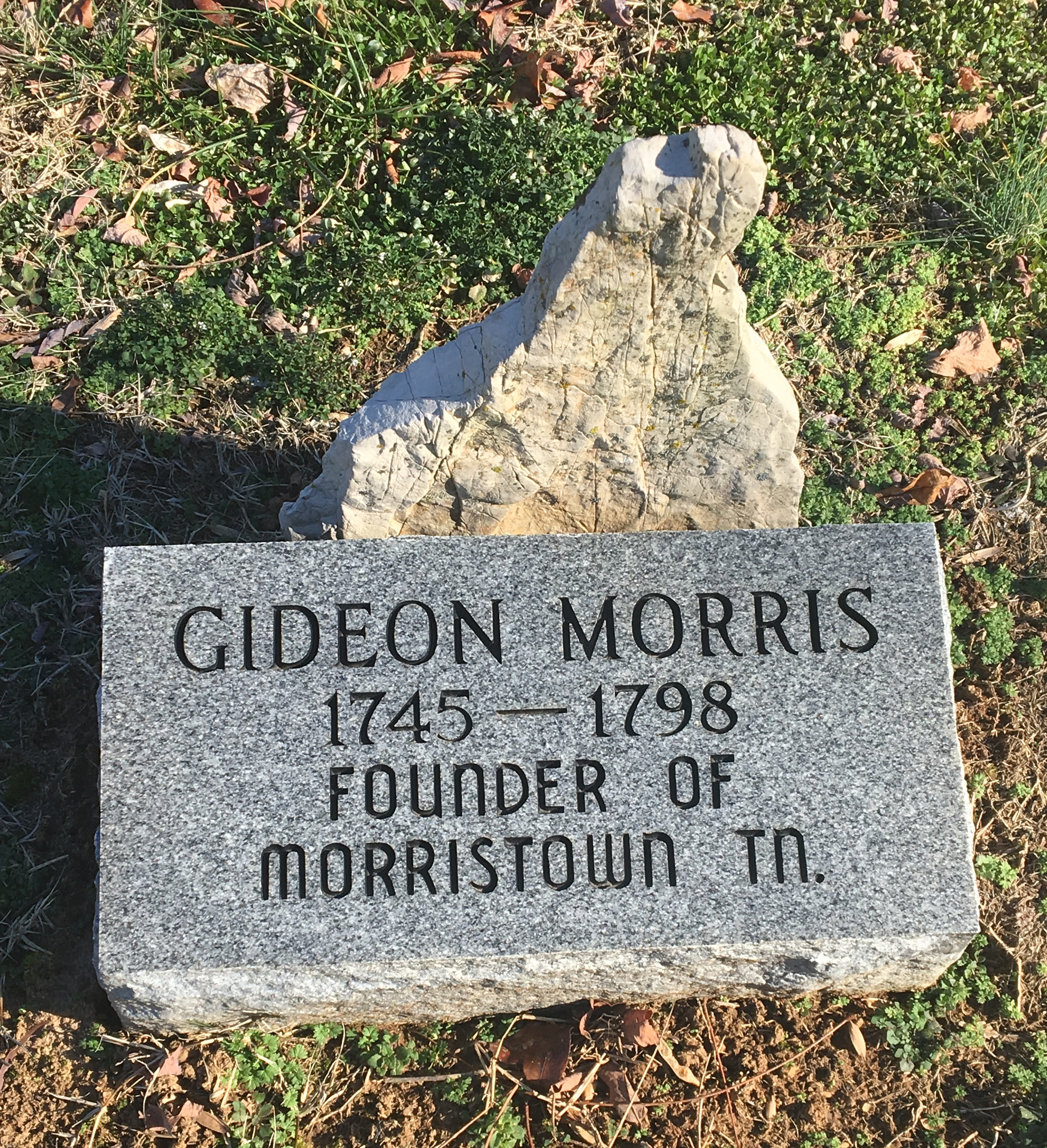
- Morris' tombstone in Morristown, Tennessee
- Born: c. 1756; Randolph County, Province of North Carolina
- Died: April 1798; Jefferson County, Tennessee
- Resting place: Morris Cemetery, Morristown, Tennessee
- Occupation: Settler
- Known for: Founding Morristown, Tennessee
- Spouse: Jenette Blythe (1748–1828)

Gideon Morris (c. 1756 – April 1798) was an early American settler and trans-Appalachian pioneer. He was a part of the Watauga Association and is most known for founding the city of Morristown, Tennessee.

== Biography ==
Gideon Morris was born in Randolph County, North Carolina around 1756.

Records from North Carolina state that Morris moved to the Watauga Settlement with an unspecified amount of siblings. In 1775, Morris signed the Watauga Petition to annex Watauga to North Carolina. Records also stated that Morris served in an expedition against Native Americans in the fall of 1775.

In 1778 Gideon Morris appeared in court and swore an oath of allegiance. Lands were granted by the State of North Carolina to Morris in Washington, Greene and Hawkins counties. He most likely settled on parts of these grants either in 1787 or 1791, which was included in Jefferson County and now in Hamblen County. The settlement founded by Morris has, as far as is known, always been called Morristown. No known records exist demonstrating land grants in the area to anyone aside from Gideon and his extended family. Jefferson County possesses a record of the results of the execution of Morris' will, which includes property deeded to his son John Morris in 1817 for a 400-acre tract of land originally granted to Gideon by the state of North Carolina, and presumably comprising only a portion of the original grant due to the known size of the Morris family at that time. Morris lived on that tract of land until his death in 1798.

Morris is buried in Morris Cemetery in Morristown, Tennessee. A Tennessee state historical marker stands near the cemetery to commemorate the founders of the town.

== Legacy ==
Morris' settlement of Morristown would be included in the new state of Tennessee in 1796 and would be incorporated in 1855. The town became the county seat of the newly formed Hamblen County in 1870.
