= Rose Center =

Rose Center may refer to one of these centers in the United States:

- Rose Center (Tennessee), a community cultural center in Morristown, Tennessee, housed in the Rose School built in 1892 as the town's first coeducational public high school
- Rose Center for Earth and Space, part of the American Museum of Natural History in New York City, New York
- Rose Center for Public Leadership, originally founded by Daniel Rose at the Urban Land Institute in Washington, DC
