= Hamblen County, Tennessee =

County in Tennessee, United States

- County
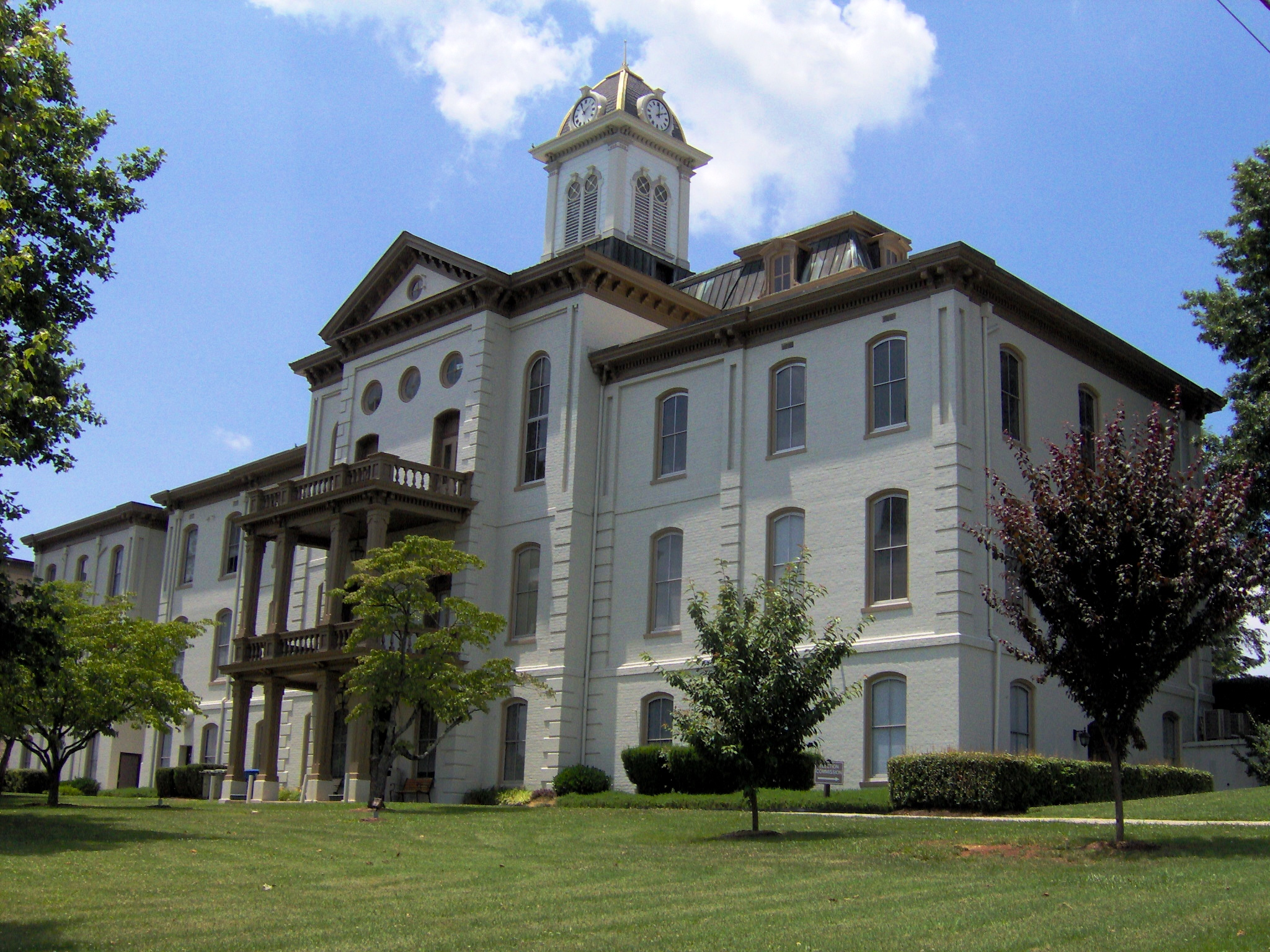
- Hamblen County Courthouse in Morristown

- Logo
- Motto(s): Service, Community, Industry
- Location within the U.S. state of Tennessee
- Coordinates: 36°13′N 83°16′W
- Country: United States
- State: Tennessee
- Founded: 1870
- Named for: Hezekiah Hamblen
- Seat: Morristown
- Largest city: Morristown

Government
  - Mayor: Chris Cutshaw (R)

Area
  - Total: 176 sq mi (460 km^{2})
  - Land: 161 sq mi (420 km^{2})
  - Water: 15 sq mi (39 km^{2}) 8.3%

Population (2020)
  - Total: 64,499
  - Estimate (2025): 68,843 ▲
  - Density: 400.61/sq mi (154.68/km^{2})
- Time zone: UTC−5 (Eastern)
  - Summer (DST): UTC−4 (EDT)
- Congressional district: 1st
- Website: www.hamblencountytn.gov

Hamblen County is a county located in the U.S. state of Tennessee. As of the 2020 census, the population was 64,499. Its county seat and only incorporated city is Morristown. Hamblen County is the core county of the Morristown, Tennessee Metropolitan Statistical Area, which includes Hamblen and Jefferson counties. The county and the Morristown MSA are included in the Knoxville–Morristown–Sevierville, TN Combined Statistical Area.

== History ==
Hamblen County was created in 1870 from parts of Jefferson, Grainger, and Hawkins counties. The county is named in honor of Hezekiah Hamblen (1775–1854), an early settler, landowner, attorney, and member of the Hawkins County Court for many years. Governor Dewitt Clinton Senter, a resident of the county, used his influence to assist in its establishment. The Hamblen County Courthouse was completed in 1874.

During World War I, Hamblen County was the only county in the United States to have two Medal of Honor recipients. Edward R. Talley and Calvin Ward both earned them while fighting on the Western Front.

During World War II, the attack transport naval ship USS Hamblen was named after the county.

=== Historic sites ===
- Bethesda Presbyterian Church
- Crockett Tavern Museum
- Morristown College, now Fulton-Hill Park
- Morristown Main Street Historic District
- Rose Center

== Geography ==
According to the U.S. Census Bureau, the county has a total area of 176 square miles (460 km^{2}), of which 161 square miles (420 km^{2}) is land and 15 square miles (39 km^{2}) (8.3%) is water. It is the third-smallest county in Tennessee by land area and fourth-smallest by total area.

=== Adjacent counties ===
- Hawkins County (northeast)
- Greene County (east)
- Cocke County (south)
- Jefferson County (southwest)
- Grainger County (northwest)

=== State protected areas ===
- Panther Creek State Park
- Rankin Wildlife Management Area (partial)

=== Major highways ===
- I-81
- US 11E
- US 25E
- SR 66
- SR 113
- SR 160
- SR 340
- SR 341
- SR 342
- SR 343
- SR 344

=== Waterways ===
The main source of water in Hamblen County is the man-made Cherokee Lake. Cherokee Lake was created during World War II as part of the TVA hydroelectric project. Multiple sources, including a series of natural creeks and runoff waters, feed the lake. The lake originates at its first source in Poor Valley Creek, Hawkins County, and extends through neighboring Grainger County and then Hamblen County. Cherokee Lake then ends with Cherokee Dam, where the water is drained into the Holston River. In total, Cherokee Lake has 28,780 acres of surface area and extends for 400 miles of shoreline, though only a portion of this resides in Hamblen County.

== Demographics ==
Historical population
Census	Pop.	Note	%±
1880	10,187		—
1890	11,418		12.1%
1900	12,728		11.5%
1910	13,650		7.2%
1920	15,056		10.3%
1930	16,616		10.4%
1940	18,611		12.0%
1950	23,976		28.8%
1960	33,092		38.0%
1970	38,696		16.9%
1980	49,300		27.4%
1990	50,480		2.4%
2000	58,128		15.2%
2010	62,544		7.6%
2020	64,499		3.1%
2025 (est.)	68,843	▲	6.7%
U.S. Decennial Census; 1790-1960 1900-1990; 1990-2000 2010-2014

=== Racial and ethnic composition ===
Hamblen County, Tennessee – Racial and ethnic composition Note: the US Census treats Hispanic/Latino as an ethnic category. This table excludes Latinos from the racial categories and assigns them to a separate category. Hispanics/Latinos may be of any race.
Race / ethnicity (NH = Non-Hispanic)	Pop 1980	Pop 1990	Pop 2000	Pop 2010	Pop 2020	% 1980	% 1990	% 2000	% 2010	% 2020
White alone (NH)	46,464	47,770	51,461	51,846	49,197	94.25%	94.63%	88.53%	82.90%	76.28%
Black or African American alone (NH)	2,325	2,313	2,364	2,394	2,106	4.72%	4.58%	4.07%	3.83%	3.27%
Native American or Alaska Native alone (NH)	67	83	106	100	130	0.14%	0.16%	0.18%	0.16%	0.20%
Asian alone (NH)	79	126	326	448	712	0.16%	0.25%	0.56%	0.72%	1.10%
Native Hawaiian or Pacific Islander alone (NH)	x	x	22	67	268	x	x	0.04%	0.11%	0.42%
Other race alone (NH)	33	13	73	53	152	0.07%	0.03%	0.13%	0.08%	0.24%
Mixed race or Multiracial (NH)	x	x	477	925	2,451	x	x	0.82%	1.48%	3.80%
Hispanic or Latino (any race)	332	175	3,299	6,711	9,483	0.67%	0.35%	5.68%	10.73%	14.70%
Total	49,300	50,480	58,128	62,544	64,499	100.00%	100.00%	100.00%	100.00%	100.00%

=== 2020 census ===
As of the 2020 census, the county had a population of 64,499. The median age was 40.5 years. 23.2% of residents were under the age of 18 and 18.8% of residents were 65 years of age or older. For every 100 females there were 94.7 males, and for every 100 females age 18 and over there were 92.2 males age 18 and over.

The racial makeup of the county was 79.4% White, 3.4% Black or African American, 0.7% American Indian and Alaska Native, 1.1% Asian, 0.5% Native Hawaiian and Pacific Islander, 7.6% from some other race, and 7.2% from two or more races. Hispanic or Latino residents of any race comprised 14.7% of the population.

77.3% of residents lived in urban areas, while 22.7% lived in rural areas.

There were 25,265 households in the county, of which 31.2% had children under the age of 18 living in them. Of all households, 47.6% were married-couple households, 17.5% were households with a male householder and no spouse or partner present, and 27.8% were households with a female householder and no spouse or partner present. About 27.0% of all households were made up of individuals and 13.1% had someone living alone who was 65 years of age or older.

There were 27,376 housing units, of which 7.7% were vacant. Among occupied housing units, 68.3% were owner-occupied and 31.7% were renter-occupied. The homeowner vacancy rate was 1.8% and the rental vacancy rate was 7.4%.

=== 2010 census ===
As of the census of 2010, there were 62,544 people, 29,693 households, and 17,161 families residing in the county. The population density was 388 people per square mile (150 people/km^{2}). There were 24,560 housing units at an average density of 153 units per square mile (59/km^{2}). The racial makeup of the county was 91.74% White, 4.22% African American, 0.20% Native American, 0.70% Asian, 0.09% Pacific Islander, and 1.42% from two or more races. Those of Hispanic or Latino origins constituted 10.73% of the population.

There were 24,560 households, out of which 28.4% had children under the age of 18 living with them, 51.3% were married couples living together, 13.1% had a female householder with no husband present, and 30.1% were non-families. 25.70% of all households were made up of individuals living alone, and 11.2% had someone living alone who was 65 years of age or older. The average household size was 2.51 and the average family size was 2.98.

In the county, the population was spread out, with 23.30% under the age of 20, 5.7% from 20 to 24, 25.7% from 25 to 44, 26.7% from 45 to 64, and 15.9% who were 65 years of age or older. The median age was 39.6 years. For every 100 females, there were 94.9 males. For every 100 females age 18 and over, there were 92.30 males.

The median income for a household in the county was $39,807, and the median income for a family was $48,353. Males had a median income of $36,166 versus $27,094 for females. The per capita income for the county was $21,162. 17.7% of the population and 13.2% of families were below the poverty line. Out of the total people living in poverty, 15.7% are under the age of 65 and 19.3% are 65 or older.

== Economy ==
Several large industrial parks on the eastern, western, and southern parts of the county are home to manufacturing facilities for regionally, nationally, and internationally based corporations.

== Government ==
The Hamblen County government consists of 26 elected officials, twelve appointed officials, and the staffing and offices therein. In addition to these offices, the county also houses a liaison office with the University of Tennessee for its Agricultural Extension office.

== Communities ==
=== City ===
- Morristown (county seat, small portions in Jefferson)

=== Town ===
- White Pine (mostly in Jefferson)

=== Census-designated place ===
- Russellville

=== Unincorporated communities ===
- Lowland
- Talbott (partial)
- Whitesburg
- Witt

== Public Education ==
The Hamblen County Department of Education has two high schools, four middle schools, eleven elementary/intermediate schools, and one alternative-placement school. The Tennessee Board of Regents also has a community college located in Morristown, as well as a technical college for vocational training. Hamblen County's department of education's current mission statement, as of the 2019–2020 school year, is, "The mission of Hamblen County Department of Education is to educate students so they can be challenged to successfully compete in their chosen fields." The current superintendent of Hamblen County Schools is Arnold Bunch As of the 2019–2020 school year, Hamblen County Department of Education has 10,424 students enrolled.

=== Elementary schools ===
- Alpha Elementary School
- Alpha Intermediate School
- Fairview-Marguerite Elementary School
- Hillcrest Elementary School
- John Hay Elementary
- Lincoln Heights Elementary School
- Manley Elementary
- Russellville Elementary School
- Russellville Intermediate School
- Union Heights Elementary
- West Elementary School
- Whitesburg Elementary School
- Witt Elementary School

=== Middle schools ===
- East Ridge Middle School
- Lincoln Heights Middle School
- Meadowview Middle School
- West View Middle School

=== High schools ===
- Morristown-Hamblen High School East
- Morristown-Hamblen High School West

=== Community college ===
- Walters State Community College

=== Technical college ===
- Tennessee College of Applied Technology, Morristown

=== Alternative school ===
- Miller Boyd Alternative School

== Private education ==
=== All Saints' Episcopal School ===
All Saints' Episcopal School was founded in 1967 as a preschool. In 1985, the school was expanded to include first grade. Since then, the school has further expanded (completion in 1992) to enroll students from PreK to 8th grade.

=== Cornerstone Christian Academy ===
Cornerstone Christian Academy enrolls students from grades PreK through 5.

=== Faith Christian Academy ===
Faith Christian Academy enrolls students from grades 1 through 12.

=== Morristown Covenant Academy ===
Morristown Covenant Academy was founded in 1985 and enrolls students in grades Kindergarten through 12. In their high school educational program, students can choose an educational path for general education, college/university readiness, or vocational readiness. The Morristown Covenant Academy also houses a day care and PreK program.

== Politics ==
Like almost all of East Tennessee, Hamblen County has long voted overwhelmingly Republican, starting with its powerful Unionist sentiment during the Civil War. The last Democratic candidate to carry the county was Jimmy Carter in 1976.

United States presidential election results for Hamblen County, Tennessee
Year	Republican		Democratic		Third party(ies)	
Year	No.	%	No.	%	No.	%
1912	427	28.62%	722	48.39%	343	22.99%
1916	795	50.73%	741	47.29%	31	1.98%
1920	1,571	53.86%	1,301	44.60%	45	1.54%
1924	1,342	49.48%	1,317	48.56%	53	1.95%
1928	1,902	60.09%	1,263	39.91%	0	0.00%
1932	1,458	41.40%	2,032	57.69%	32	0.91%
1936	2,261	48.12%	2,438	51.88%	0	0.00%
1940	1,794	46.27%	2,055	53.00%	28	0.72%
1944	2,001	53.73%	1,723	46.27%	0	0.00%
1948	2,116	53.80%	1,552	39.46%	265	6.74%
1952	5,031	67.19%	2,395	31.98%	62	0.83%
1956	5,608	67.77%	2,592	31.32%	75	0.91%
1960	7,093	69.23%	3,122	30.47%	30	0.29%
1964	5,196	53.00%	4,607	47.00%	0	0.00%
1968	6,382	57.86%	2,390	21.67%	2,259	20.48%
1972	8,879	76.39%	2,563	22.05%	182	1.57%
1976	6,989	47.78%	7,504	51.30%	135	0.92%
1980	9,741	60.60%	5,890	36.65%	442	2.75%
1984	11,144	68.97%	4,922	30.46%	92	0.57%
1988	10,418	66.93%	5,061	32.52%	86	0.55%
1992	8,898	49.84%	7,114	39.85%	1,842	10.32%
1996	9,797	54.13%	7,006	38.71%	1,296	7.16%
2000	11,824	60.02%	7,564	38.40%	311	1.58%
2004	14,742	66.05%	7,433	33.30%	143	0.64%
2008	15,508	68.41%	6,807	30.03%	354	1.56%
2012	14,522	72.49%	5,234	26.13%	276	1.38%
2016	15,857	76.63%	4,075	19.69%	760	3.67%
2020	18,811	76.37%	5,500	22.33%	320	1.30%
2024	20,154	79.03%	5,132	20.12%	215	0.84%

== See also ==
- National Register of Historic Places listings in Hamblen County, Tennessee
