= Evelyn Bryan Johnson =

American aviator

Evelyn Stone Bryan Johnson
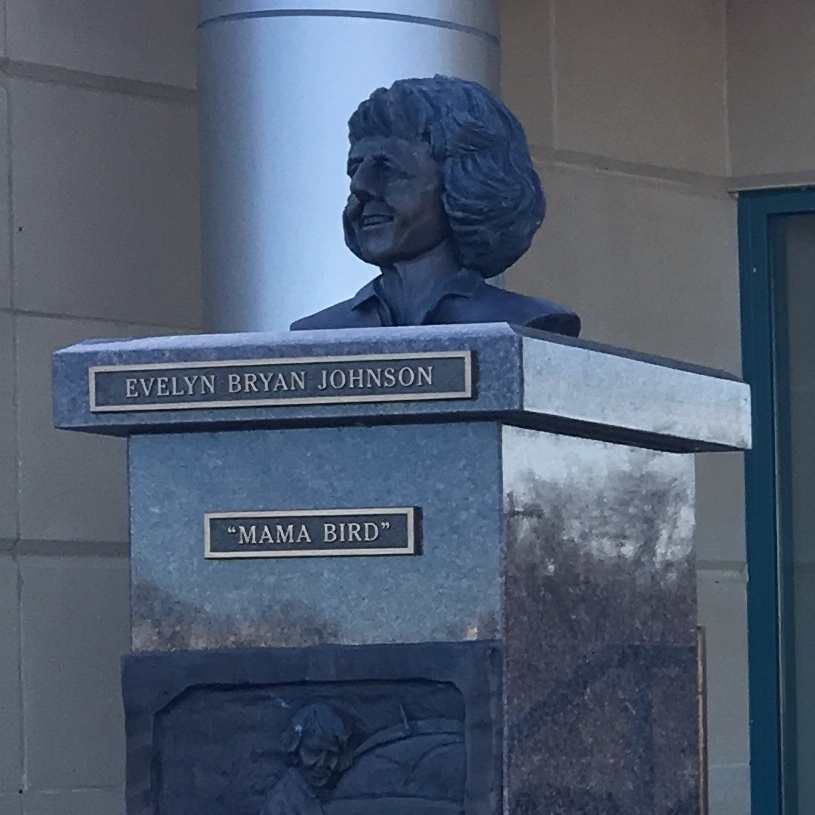
- Bust of Evelyn Bryan Johnson outside Morristown Regional Airport
- Born: Evelyn Stone; November 4, 1909; Corbin, Kentucky
- Died: May 10, 2012 (aged 102); Morristown, Tennessee
- Occupation: Aviator
- Spouse(s): Wyatt Jennings Bryan (died in 1963); Morgan Johnson (1965-1977)

Evelyn Stone Bryan Johnson (November 4, 1909 – May 10, 2012), nicknamed "Mama Bird", was the world's oldest flight instructor, and—at one point—the pilot with the highest number of flying hours in the world, of any living pilot. She was a colonel in the Civil Air Patrol and a founding member of the Morristown, Tennessee Civil Air Patrol squadron.

== Biography ==
Born as Evelyn Stone in Corbin, Kentucky, she was a graduate of Tennessee Wesleyan College. As a young woman, she taught school in Etowah, Tennessee. Later she attended the University of Tennessee.

She married Wyatt Jennings "W.J." Bryan and learned to fly in 1944, while he was serving in the Army Air Corps and the couple was living in Jefferson City, Tennessee. She logged 57,635.4 flying hours, and was the oldest flight instructor in the world. She trained more pilots and gave more FAA exams than any other pilot. She was named in the Guinness Book of World Records as having the most flying hours of any woman and the most of any living person. Johnson was inducted into the Women in Aviation Pioneers Hall of Fame, the Tennessee and Kentucky aviation halls of fame and others. She was awarded a bronze Carnegie Medal for rescuing a helicopter pilot after he crashed.

Johnson became manager of the Morristown Regional Airport in Morristown, Tennessee, in 1953. She flew into her 90s despite developing eyesight problems and only quit at 96 after a car accident on September 10, 2006, resulted in her undergoing a leg amputation. Even after that, she continued to manage the airport.

Johnson's first husband, W. J. Bryan, died on November 11, 1963. In 1965, she married Morgan Johnson, who died in 1977.

On July 21, 2007, Johnson was inducted into the National Aviation Hall of Fame in Dayton, Ohio, alongside astronaut Sally Ride and adventurer Steve Fossett, among others. The induction was her sixth such honor.

Johnson's scrapbooks, memorabilia, and other papers from the period 1930 to 2002 are housed in the Archives of Appalachia at East Tennessee State University.

Johnson died at age 102 in 2012.

== See also ==
- Ed Long (aviator)
