= John Crockett (frontiersman) =

American soldier (1753–1834)

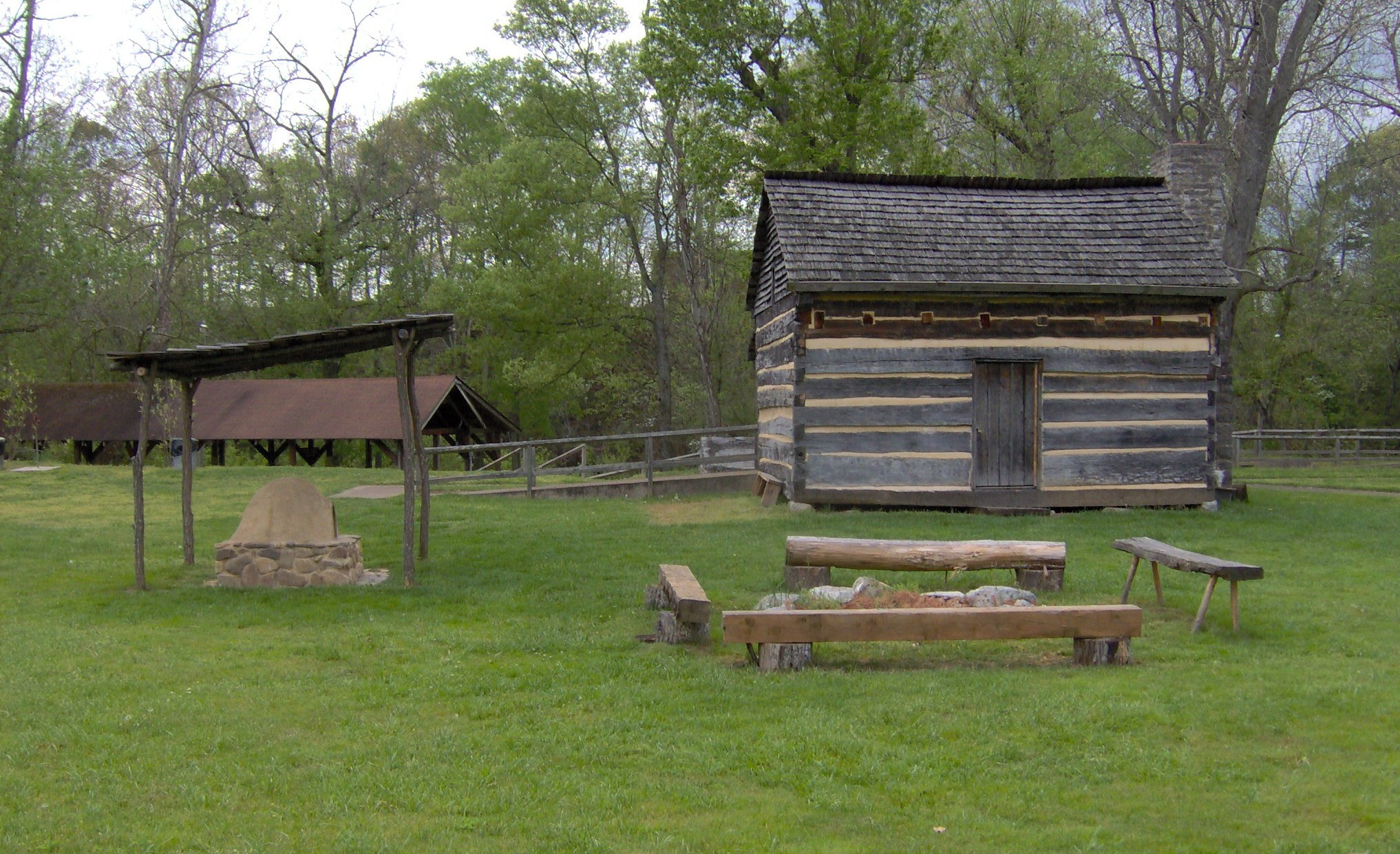
- Crockett's family cabin in Greenville, Tennessee (April 26, 2008)
- Born: c. 1753; Greene Township, North Carolina
- Died: January 30, 1834; Hamblen, Tennessee
- Spouse: Rebecca Hawkins (m. 1780)
- Children: Davy Crockett
- Military career
- Allegiance: Continental Army
- Service years: 1776-1782
- Unit: Overmountain Men
- Conflicts: American Revolutionary War; Southern theater of the American Revolutionary War; Battle of Kings Mountain

John Crockett (c. 1753 – January 30, 1834) was an American frontiersman and soldier, and the father of David "Davy" Crockett.

== Early life ==
Crockett was born about 1753 in Maryland, Frederick County, Virginia, Greene Township, North Carolina, Ireland, or during the journey from Ireland to America. "Davy" Crockett said in his autobiography that John Crockett was born either in Ireland or during the journey from Ireland to America; but later scholars disagreed, saying this had been John's father, also named David. His ancestors were of Scotch-Irish and possible Huguenot backgrounds. The Crockett/Crocketague name is a Registered Lineage with the Huguenot Society of the Founders of Manakin in the Colony of Virginia (FMCV) though "Davy" Crockett does not mention it in his autobiography.

In 1775 or 1780, Crockett married Rebecca Hawkins, from Maryland.

In 1776, David Crockett and the growing family moved to the Washington District in what is now the northeastern tip of Tennessee, near Rogersville, Tennessee.

In 1777, David Crockett and part of the family were killed in a Chickamauga Cherokee raid, led by Dragging Canoe, at the onset of the Cherokee–American wars. After the attack, the remaining Crocketts sold the property to a new settler in the area, a French Huguenot man, Colonel Thomas Amis.

== Military career ==
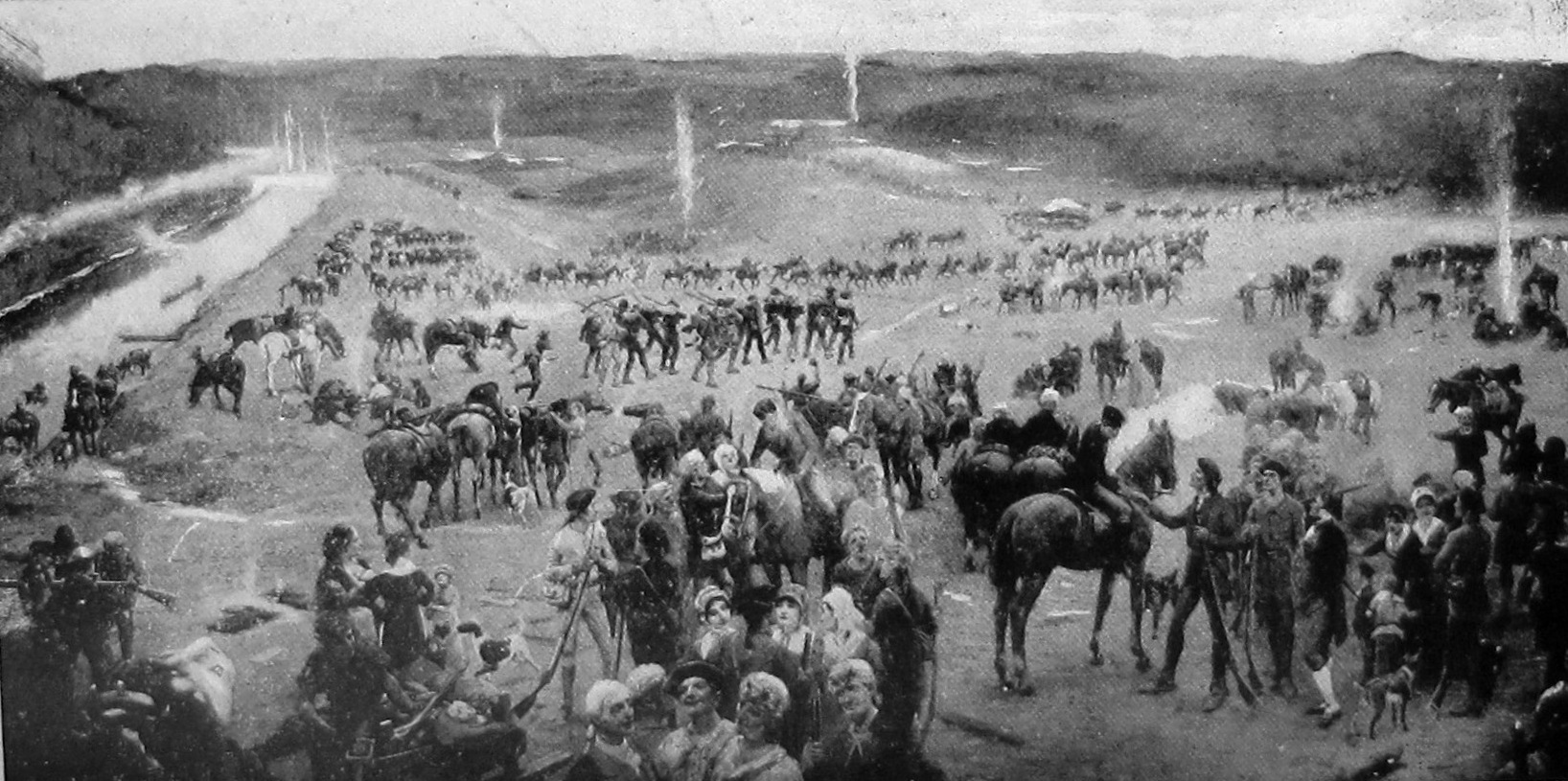
Gathering of Overmountain Men at Sycamore Shoals, a black and white reproduction of Lloyd Branson's 1915 depiction of the Patriot militias joining up.

During the American War for Independence, Crockett fought along with the Overmountain Men from west of the Appalachians. The Overmountain Men often crossed the mountains to face the British in the war's southern campaign. Crockett fought at the Battle of Kings Mountain in 1780, a major victory for the colonists.

== Later life and work ==
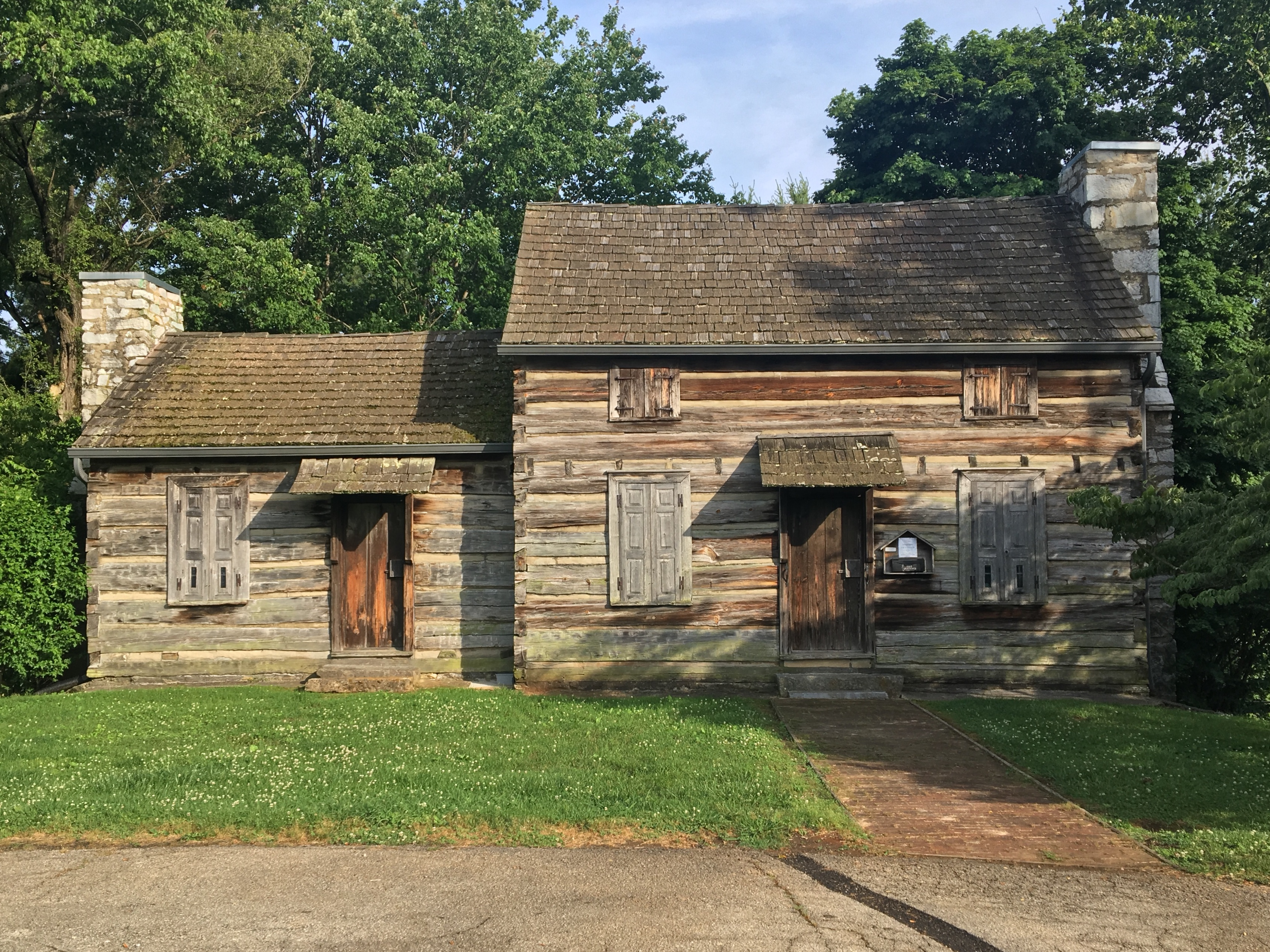
The Crockett Tavern Museum building is a reproduction of John Crockett's tavern in Morristown, Tennessee.

A respected man in the area, Crockett later became a magistrate, a farmer, and an unsuccessful land speculator. The family lived in what is now Greene County, Tennessee, close to the Nolichucky River and near the community of Limestone. It was here, at a location now commemorated as Davy Crockett Birthplace State Park, that David "Davy" Crockett was born in 1786. He was the fifth of the nine Crockett children, and was named for his grandfather. At the time of his birth, the area was part of the autonomous State of Franklin. In 1788, Crockett was justice of the court when a young Andrew Jackson received his law license according to some genealogies.

After a flood destroyed their house, the Crocketts moved to the Morristown, Tennessee area (1792) and built a tavern on a newly constructed stage road between Abingdon, Virginia and Knoxville, Tennessee. The Crockett Tavern Museum now stands on the site, housed in a reconstruction of the tavern.

=== Young "Davy" helps out ===
In 1798, when David was 12, Crockett hired him out to Jacob Siler to drive cattle. After young David fulfilled his original obligation to Siler, he returned to his father's home. The family sent Davy to a school that had been established nearby, but he did not like school and quit attending after a few days. The elder Crockett was drunk when he learned his son was avoiding school and he punished Davy severely, leading him to flee and stay away for years. David Crockett returned in 1802 and helped pay off his father's debts.

== Death ==
It's not clear when Crockett died, though some genealogies have his year of death as 1834.

== Crockett family tree ==
David Crockett family tree
- Gabriel Gustave de Crocketagne m. Mademoiselle de Saix of France
  - Antoine de Saussure Peronette de Crocketagne (changed name to Crockett) (1643–1735) m. Louise de Saix (1648)
    - Joseph Louis Crockett born in Ireland (1676–1749) m. Sarah Gilbert Stewart (1680–1776)
      - William David Crockett (1709–1770) m. Elizabeth Boulay (1710)
        - David "the Elder" Crockett (1729–1777) m. Elizabeth Hedge (1730–1777)
          - William Crockett (1748–1846)
          - David Crockett Jr.
          - Robert Crockett
          - Alexander Crockett
          - James Crockett
          - Joseph Crockett
          - John Crockett (1753–1834) m. Rebecca Hawkins (1756–1832)
            - Margaret Catharine Crockett (c. 1778–1792)
            - Nathan Crockett (1778–1839)
            - William Crockett (1780–1840)
            - Aaron Crockett (1782–1835)
            - James Patterson Crockett (1784–1834)
            - David Crockett (1786–1836)
              - m. Polly Finley (1788–1815)
                - John Wesley Crockett (1807–1852) m. Martha Hamilton
                - William Finley Crockett (1809–1846) m. Clorinda Boyett
                - Margaret Finley (Polly) Crockett (1812–1860) m. Wiley Flowers
              - m. Elizabeth Patton (1788–1860)
                - Robert Patton Crockett (1816–1889)
                  - m. Matilda Porter
                  - m. Louisa A. Wohlford
                  - m. Lydia America Corley
                - Rebecca Elvira Crockett (1818–1879)
                  - m. George Kimbrough
                  - m. James Halford
                - Matilda Crockett (1821–1890)
                  - m. Thomas P. Tyson
                  - m. James Wilson
                  - m. Redden Fields
            - John Crockett (1787–1841)
            - Elizabeth Crockett (1788–1805)
            - Rebecca Crockett (1796–1819)
