= Hamblen County Courthouse =

- U.S. National Register of Historic Places
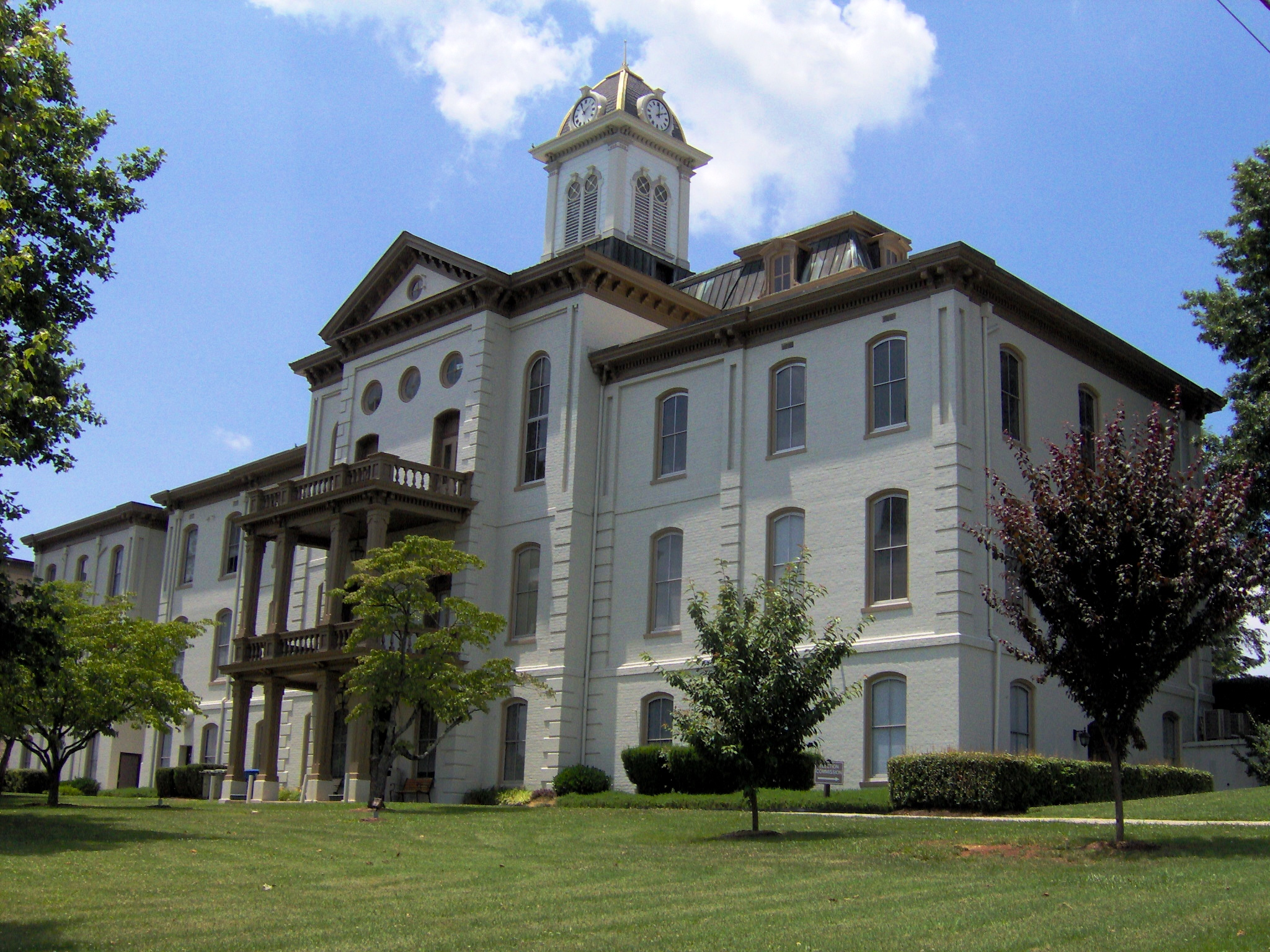

- Location within Tennessee
- Location: 511 W. 2nd North St., Morristown, Tennessee
- Coordinates: 36°12′44″N 83°17′55″W
- Area: 6 acres (2.4 ha)
- Built: 1873-74
- Architect: Bruce, A.C.; et al.
- Architectural style: Second Empire, Italianate
- NRHP reference No.: 73001770
- Added to NRHP: April 13, 1973

The Hamblen County Courthouse, at 511 W. 2nd North St. in Morristown, Tennessee, was listed on the National Register of Historic Places in 1973. It is the county courthouse for Hamblen County, Tennessee. It was designed by architect A.C. Bruce and was built from 1873 to 1874. It has been expanded and modified over the years, and includes Second Empire and Italianate stylings.

On Veterans Day 2019, the Hamblen County Veterans Memorial was completed on the courthouse front lawn. There is a Civil War Trails sign detailing Morristown during the Civil War and the 1864 Battle of Morristown also on the front lawn.

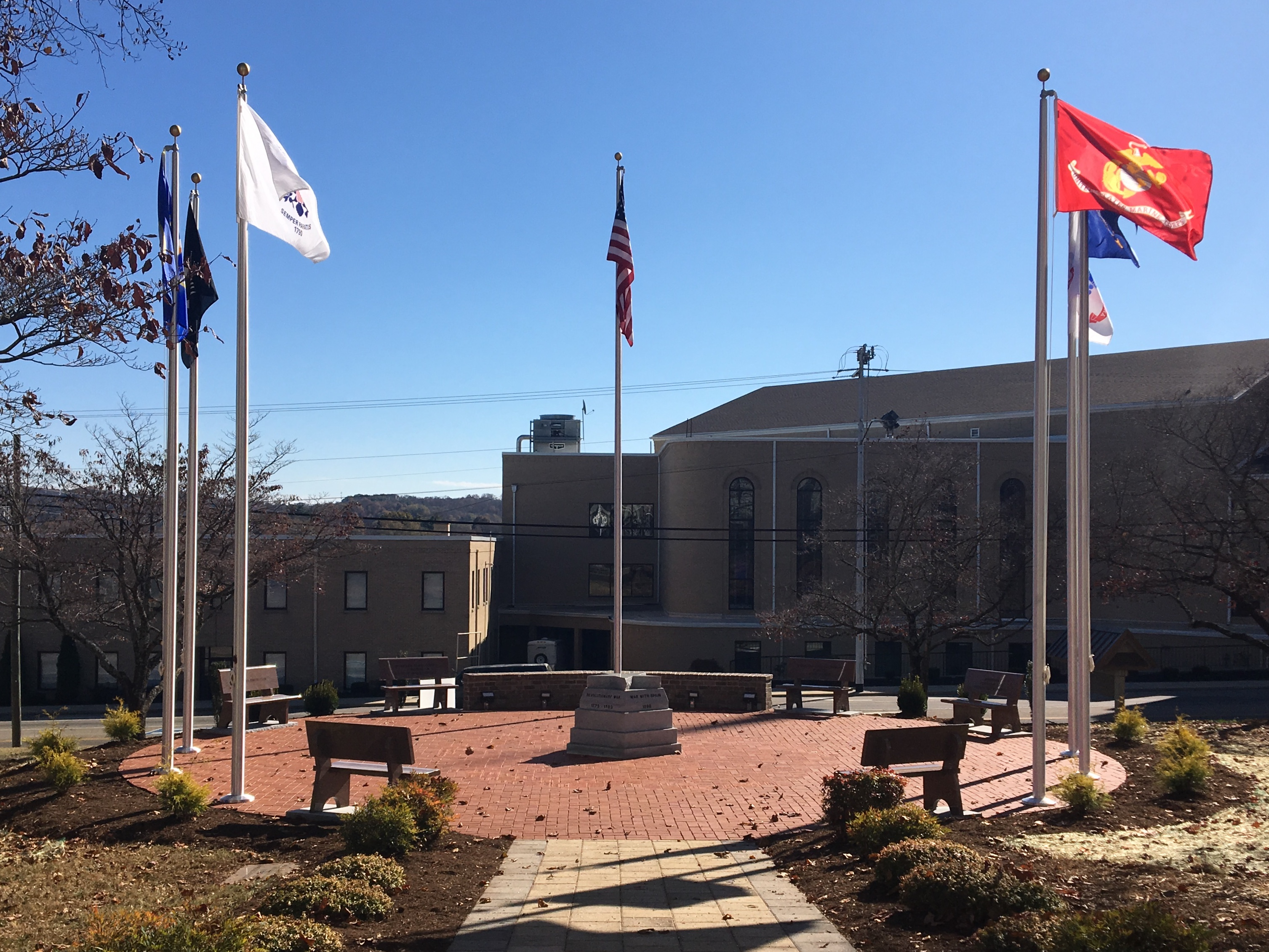
The Veterans Memorial on the courthouse's front lawn.
