= Morristown, Tennessee =

Largest city and county seat of Hamblen County, Tennessee, United States

Morristown
- City
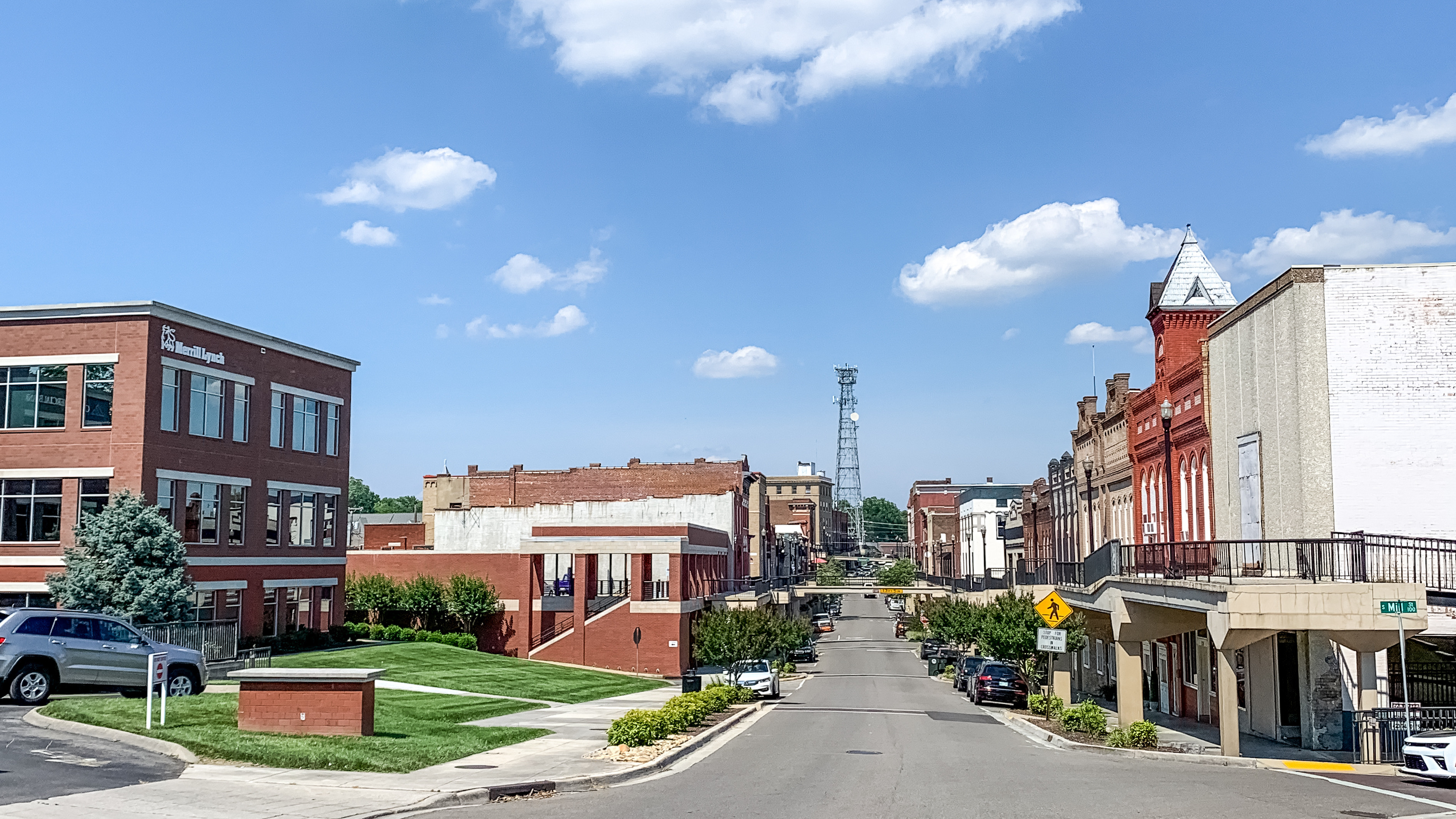
- Main Street in the downtown district of Morristown.

- Flag Logo
- Nicknames: Mo'Town, Tennessee’s Disc Golf Capital
- Motto: "A City Always Expanding"
- Location in Hamblen County and the state of Tennessee

- Location within Tennessee Location within the United States
- Coordinates: 36°12′38″N 83°17′46″W
- Country: United States
- State: Tennessee
- Counties: Hamblen, Jefferson
- Settled: ca. 1787
- Incorporated: 1855
- Founder: Gideon Morris
- Named for: Gideon Morris

Government
  - Type: Council-manager
  - Mayor: Gary Chesney
  - City Manager: Tony Cox
  - City Council: Council members: Bob Garrett (1st Ward); Chris Bivens (2nd Ward); Kay Senter (3rd Ward, Vice Mayor); Al A'Hearn (4th Ward); Tommy Pedigo (at-large); Joseph "Joe" Senter (at-large)

Area
  - City: 27.72 sq mi (71.79 km^{2})
  - Land: 27.67 sq mi (71.67 km^{2})
  - Water: 0.042 sq mi (0.11 km^{2})
- Elevation: 1,302 ft (397 m)

Population (2020)
  - City: 30,431
  - Density: 1,099.7/sq mi (424.58/km^{2})
  - Urban: 65,631
  - Metro: 142,749
- Demonym: Morristownian
- Time zone: UTC-5 (EST)
  - Summer (DST): UTC-4 (EDT)
- ZIP codes: 37813-37816
- Area codes: 423 and 729
- FIPS code: 47-50280
- GNIS feature ID: 2404307
- Primary Airport: Morristown Regional Airport
- Website: www.mymorristown.com

Morristown is a city in and the county seat of Hamblen County, Tennessee, United States. Morristown also extends into Jefferson County on the western and southern ends. The city lies within the Ridge and Valley region of the Appalachians, along Cherokee Lake on the Holston River. The city's population was recorded to be 30,431 at the 2020 United States census. It is the principal city of the Morristown Metropolitan Statistical Area, which encompasses Hamblen and Jefferson counties. (Grainger County was included in the metropolitan area until 2023). The Morristown metropolitan area is also part of the Knoxville-Morristown-Sevierville Combined Statistical Area.

Established in 1855, Morristown developed into a thriving community due to its strategic location at the intersection of two major stagecoach routes. It would experience turmoil from battles in its immediate area and its change of control under Union and Confederate forces during the Civil War. Following the war, Morristown furthered its industrial growth with companies expanding rail access, making it a prominent logistics hub into the 20th century. Since the mid-20th century, the city has established itself as the regional economic hub and metropolis of the Lakeway Area region following efforts to expand the industrial sector of the city's economy into a market with over 100 companies, providing a workforce of an estimated 30,000 people.

== History ==
=== Early years and establishment ===
Before its settlement by European-Americans, the area of Morristown was inhabited by Native Americans, predominately members of the Cherokee tribe. During the Cherokee's inhabitance, the area was based around two major pathways, an east-west route that was later developed into the Great Stage Road in the settlement era, and a north-south route known as Buffalo Trail, named for a legend stating the path was formed from herds of buffalo traveling from Asheville, North Carolina to the Powell River near the Cumberland Gap for the river's salt licks.

The settlement of Morristown was established by trans-Appalachian pioneer Gideon Morris, a farmer who arrived with his brothers Daniel and Absalom from the Watauga Settlement, a semi-autonomous government based on land that was leased to European-American settlers from the inhabiting Cherokee tribes. Prior to his settlement, Morris had fought alongside John Sevier in the Cherokee Expedition in 1776, and obtained land grants after serving in the American Revolutionary War at the Battle of Kings Mountain.

Morris, along with his siblings, petitioned to have the Watauga Settlement annexed in the State of North Carolina. With the petition's success, the settlement was named Morristown, and land grants containing present-day Hamblen and Jefferson counties were assigned to Morris and his brothers in 1787 by North Carolina state officials. The Morris household built their first home off of present-day South Cumberland Street in Morristown, which remained occupied by descendants of the Morris family for several generations.

From 1792 to 1793, the community's main street was added onto a major stagecoach route connecting it to Knoxville and Abingdon, Virginia, aiding further early settlement efforts. Among these settlers was frontiersman John Crockett, who arrived and settled east of the Morris residence in 1794 with his son, famed pioneer and folk-hero Davy Crockett who was seven years old at the time. John Crockett constructed a log cabin that later served as a tavern, and a hospital treating smallpox during the American Civil War. After the Civil War, the Crockett Tavern was destroyed to prevent further infections of smallpox. The current-day Crockett Tavern Museum sits at the approximate location of the former tavern and is listed on the National Register of Historic Places. John's son, Davy resided in Morristown until 1809, when he relocated to Middle Tennessee to go into Tennessee state politics.

By 1833, Morristown developed into a small village, consisting of a post office, a general store, a blacksmith and machine shop which was the first major enterprise in the town, and several log cabin residences along the main stagecoach route known as the Great Stage Road that divided the community into two counties, Grainger to the north, and Jefferson to the south. Morristown Academy, the community's first documented school, opened to students in 1830. In 1855, Morristown was incorporated into a city to provide new services to the community's growing population. Railroad access became available to Morristown when construction completed on the East Tennessee and Virginia Railroad in 1858, which was the first railroad line to be operational in the state of Tennessee. Morristown was serviced by its first newspaper, the American Statesman, in 1857 after relocating to Morristown from Dandridge, the seat of Jefferson County. By 1860, Morristown was recorded by the United States Census Bureau to have an initial population of 500 as an incorporated city.

Between 1855 and 1870, Morristown's municipal limits were divided along Main Street into Grainger and Jefferson counties. Many residents brought concerns regarding transportation and communication access in Morristown, and neighboring communities such as Russellville and Panther Springs raised concerns as well regarding accessibility to Morristown. After working with government officials from the neighboring counties and the state government, Hamblen County was formed from portions of Grainger, Jefferson, Hawkins, and Greene counties. Morristown was chosen as the county seat of Hamblen County shortly after its formation in 1870.

=== Civil War ===
As the Civil War approached, the town's sympathies were divided between the Union and secessionist sides. In December 1863, some 25,000 Confederate Army soldiers under the command of General James Longstreet arrived at Bethesda Presbyterian Church, northeast of the town, to spend the winter, after the Battle of Bean's Station. They remained there until February 1864 and used the Bethesda Church building as a hospital. Military engagements occurred near the church in both October and November 1864. On October 28, 1864, Union General Alvan C. Gillem attacked Confederate forces under General John C. Vaughn in the Battle of Morristown. They fought in and around the town with Gillem routing Vaughn's Confederates in what became known as "Vaughn's Stampede." Vaughn was forced to retreat to Carter's Station on the Watauga River in northeastern Tennessee. The battle resulted in about 335 total casualties. In the Battle of Bull's Gap ("Gillem's Stampede") in November, Confederate forces under General John C. Breckinridge prevailed over Gillem's troops, chasing the Union forces westward to a defensive position at Strawberry Plains near Knoxville. During one of these skirmishes, a cannonball penetrated one of the church walls, causing structural damage that was repaired by reinforcing the walls with large iron rods. The Union Army used the church as a hospital for soldiers wounded in these operations. Many soldiers from both sides are interred in the Bethesda Church cemetery. Eighty of the wartime burials are unidentified.

=== Later 19th century developments ===
Morristown saw a steady shift into an industrially-based economy in the early beginnings of the Industrial Revolution, around the early to late 19th century. The first industry in the area was the Shields Paper Mill, located on the Holston River, operating from 1825 to 1861. Other prominent early businesses included the Morristown Manufacturing Company and the later Knoxville-based J. F. Goodson Coffee Company in 1882.

From 1891 to 1928, Morristown was a terminal on the Knoxville and Bristol Railroad, commonly known by locals as the "Peavine Railroad." The railroad was a branch line of the Southern Railway that ran from downtown Morristown on Main Street to Corryton, a bedroom community outside of Knoxville. The Peavine Railroad had first operated between Morristown and Bean Station, with plans to connect north to the Cumberland Gap, but instead extended west through Grainger County towards Knoxville due to feasibility concerns regarding construction through the Clinch Mountain valley.

=== Mid 20th century to present day ===
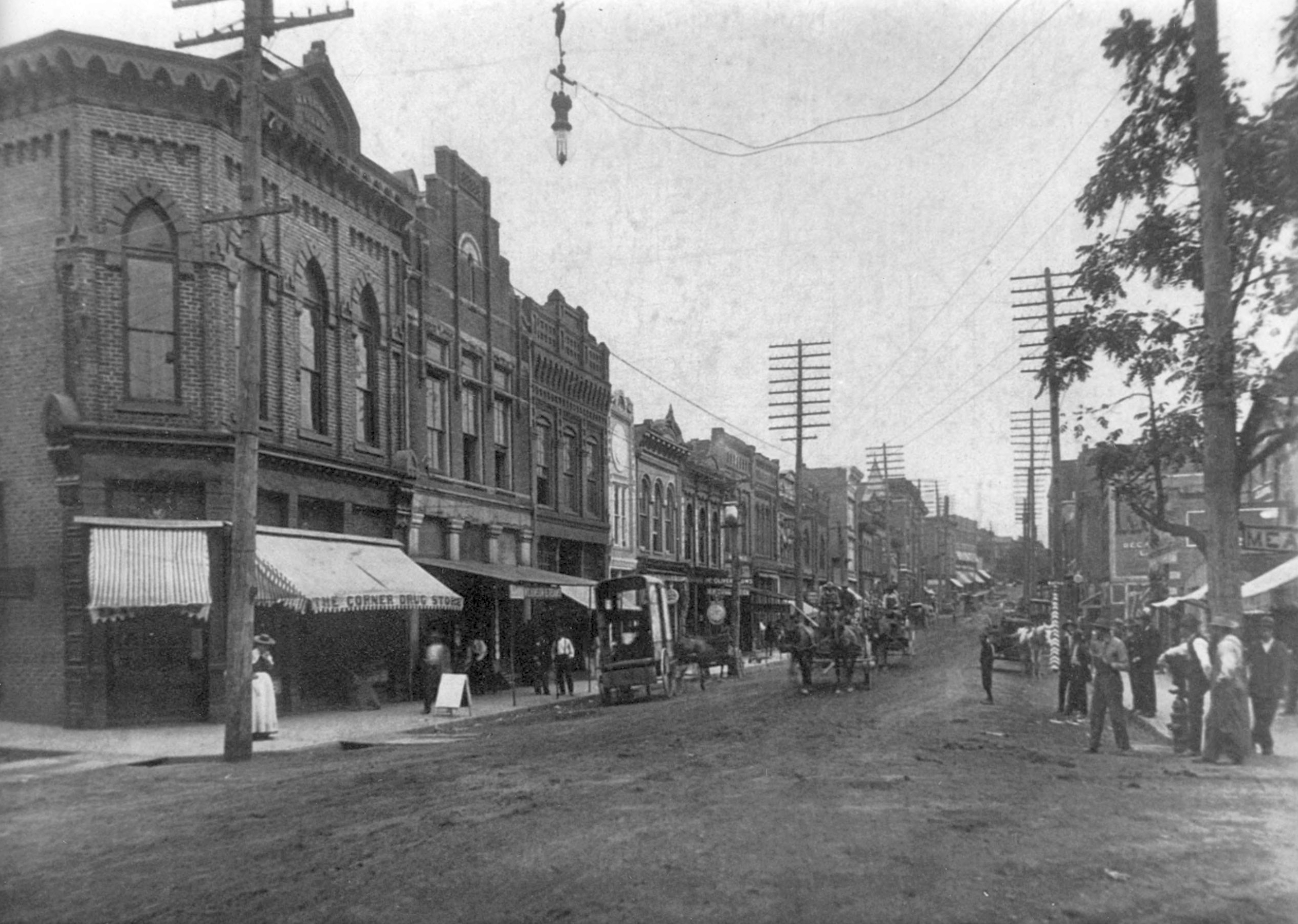
Main Street (circa 1905)

==== American Enka and the labor movement ====
In 1944, the American Enka Company, a rayon fiber producer based out of Asheville, North Carolina, began construction on a 230-acre plant in the Lowland region of Morristown, beginning operations in 1947.

In March 1950, workers at the facility walked out on strike. Officials from American Enka Company then advertised for replacements of the striking workers. Tensions soon built when residents of Morristown and Lowland appeared at the gates of the Enka plant to apply for the listed jobs. Violence then followed, with shots fired, cars damaged, and one adjacent house destroyed by dynamite. The then-governor of Tennessee, Gordon Browning, dispatched National Guard troops to restore order at the Enka factory. By the end of the strike, and following acts of violence and vandalism, its story had become national front-page news, and on-site congressional hearings regarding labor relations and the labor movement were held in Morristown, led by Democratic Senator Hubert Humphrey.

In 1985, the American Enka facility was acquired by BASF and continued under their operations until 1992, when it was sold to Lenzing AG. The plant closed in 2005, after the company that operated the plant, Liberty Fibers, filed for bankruptcy. The plant site and its adjacent wastewater treatment plant have since been annexed into the Morristown city limits.

==== Industrial development ====
Beginning in 1959, following then presidential candidate John F. Kennedy's exposure to poverty in Appalachia, Morristown officials began a joint effort with Tennessee economic development representatives to establish the city as a major industrial hub, and the program began with the construction and completion of the East Tennessee Valley Industrial District (ETVID) industrial park in eastern Morristown near Russellville. In 1962, the world's largest manufacturer of chains, the Jeffrey Manufacturing Company opened a plant to manufacture its steel thimble roller chains.

By 1978, the 375 acres (1.52 km^{2}) ETVID industrial park had reached its estimated capacity, prompting city officials to develop a second industrial park. After acquiring a 670 acres (2.7 km^{2}) site in western Morristown near Morristown Regional Airport in the same year, city officials developed the site into the Morristown Airport Industrial District (MAID) industrial park in 1981. Five months after the park's completion, two companies opened facilities at the MAID. As overall economic prosperity continued to make gains in Morristown, city officials and development representatives have cited Morristown's industrial development initiative as an example of economic growth:

In the 1990s, the City of Morristown acquired over 900 acres (3.6 km^{2}) near Interstate 81 exit 8 for its third industrial park, the East Tennessee Progress Center (ETPC). Initial site development such as roadway and utility upgrades were completed in 2001. Several large manufacturers opened facilities at the site, but further infrastructure upgrades, grading work, and property acquisition was done on the site throughout the 2000s and 2010s.

Following the Great Recession, Morristown saw the loss of one of its largest employers, Berkline, which closed after filing for Chapter 11 bankruptcy in 2011. The furniture manufacturer, which relocated to the city in 1937, eliminated 602 jobs and ended an era of Morristown being known as a predominately furniture manufacturing hub:

"For two or three generations, Morristown has been considered a furniture town, and this is the last of the major furniture operations here."

— Hamblen County Mayor Bill Brittain, "Furniture maker Berkline closing Morristown operation", Knoxville News Sentinel (2011)

In 2018, Belgian bus manufacturer Van Hool announced the construction of a 500,000 square feet (46,000 m^{2}) facility at the ETPC (East Tennessee Progress Center), one of the largest industrial development projects in the history of Morristown. The project expects to create an estimated 650 jobs, over $47 million in private investment and an influx of interest of further industrial development in the Morristown area.

==== Downtown emergence and the "Skymart" project ====
By 1833, Morristown had its first post office and store located along Main Street. Fourteen years later, railroad lines were built, stimulating further commercial growth until the beginning of the American Civil War. Morristown's Main Street district, measuring approximately 1 square mile (2.6 km^{2}), arose from the intersection of two railroad lines, gradually turning Morristown into wholesale/retail hub after the end of the Civil War.

At the start of the 20th century, new buildings were erected in the downtown area, including the Henry Street Post Office, the First National Bank Building, and the Princess Theater. The Princess Theater was the first theater in Morristown and showcased touring musical acts, ministerial shows, pageants, films, and special Grand Ole Opry performances. Following the opening of theaters in neighboring shopping complexes, the Princess Theater closed in 1982, and was demolished in 1995.

Following the 1950s, the downtown district saw losses in revenue, as a suburban shopping mall on the city's west side jeopardized businesses downtown. The city developed a plan to modernize Main Street by creating an "overhead sidewalk" as part of the nationwide push for urban renewal projects, enabling businesses to form on the second floor of existing buildings while serving as a canopy for passage below. Building owners spent nearly $2 million ($16 million today) upgrading their properties and linking them to ramps, while the government contributed over $5 million to build the elevated walkways. The underground channel for Turkey Creek was also enlarged and rerouted. In 1962, Turkey Creek, which bisects the street, flooded and damaged the downtown commercial district. The project was completed in 1967, becoming the first second-story sidewalk system in an American city. Over time, the Skymart has served as little more than a remnant of the idealism of 1960s urban renewal projects. Despite the aftermath of the project, the overhead sidewalks still stand in the downtown area.

Morristown is embarking on a resurrection of the Skymart, eyeing the structure as a key redevelopment tool for turning downtown into a social and commercial hub. It has been made a key element in a greenway master plan along Turkey Creek, with plans to connect downtown Morristown to Cherokee Park and Cherokee Lake. In an effort to renew public interest, city officials, the Crossroads Downtown Partnership, and the Morristown Area Chamber of Commerce hold events in the city's downtown or the "Skymart District" throughout the year, mainly during the warmer months of May to September.

Since the 1990s, the Latino population in Morristown has been one of the fasting growing in the Southeastern United States, with the population growing from a few hundred in the 1990s, to over 10,000 in the 2000s, and in 2023 with 31% of students in the Morristown-Hamblen school system having a Latin American immigrant background.

== Geography and ecology ==
Morristown is situated in the upper region of East Tennessee in the Tennessee Valley between the Great Smoky Mountains to the south and Clinch Mountain to the north. It is considered part of a region known as the "Lakeway Area", consisting of a land area surrounding Cherokee and Douglas lakes. The city lies within the Southern Limestone/Dolomite Valleys & Low Rolling Hills ecoregion (ecoregion 67f) within the Ridge and Valley of the Appalachians. Natural vegetation cover within this region is typically Appalachian oak forest, consisting of mixed oaks, hickory, pine, poplar, birch, maple; bottomland oak and mesophytic forests; and cedar barrens.

According to the 2010 census, the city has a total area of 28.0 square miles (72.4 km^{2}), of which 0.04 square miles (0.1 km^{2}), or 0.19%, are water. Cherokee Lake, an artificial reservoir built by the Tennessee Valley Authority in the 1940s, is north of the city.

=== Climate ===
Morristown falls in the humid subtropical climate zone (Köppen climate classification Cfa), although it is not quite as hot as areas to the south and west of Tennessee due to the higher elevations. Summers are hot and humid, with July highs averaging 85 °F (29 °C), lows averaging 66 °F (19 °C), and an average of eight days per year with temperatures above 90 °F (32 °C). Winters are generally cool, with occasional small amounts of snow. January averages a high of around 45 °F (7 °C) and a low of around 28 °F (−2 °C), although low temperatures in the single digits and teens are not uncommon. The record high for Morristown, since 1994, is 103 °F (39 °C), while the record low is −2 °F (−19 °C). Annual precipitation averages around 44.3 in (1,125 mm), and average winter snowfall is 11.7 inches (30 cm). The average monthly relative humidity is around 70 percent.

Climate data for Morristown, Tennessee (1991–2020 normals, extremes 1936–1943, 1982–present)
Month	Jan	Feb	Mar	Apr	May	Jun	Jul	Aug	Sep	Oct	Nov	Dec	Year
Record high °F (°C)	77 (25)	80 (27)	84 (29)	90 (32)	91 (33)	103 (39)	103 (39)	100 (38)	96 (36)	95 (35)	84 (29)	78 (26)	103 (39)
Mean maximum °F (°C)	67.7 (19.8)	70.2 (21.2)	77.6 (25.3)	83.8 (28.8)	87.2 (30.7)	91.4 (33.0)	93.5 (34.2)	92.0 (33.3)	89.6 (32.0)	82.9 (28.3)	75.0 (23.9)	66.9 (19.4)	94.3 (34.6)
Mean daily maximum °F (°C)	46.2 (7.9)	50.8 (10.4)	59.7 (15.4)	69.2 (20.7)	76.8 (24.9)	83.3 (28.5)	86.4 (30.2)	85.6 (29.8)	80.6 (27.0)	70.3 (21.3)	58.7 (14.8)	49.0 (9.4)	68.0 (20.0)
Daily mean °F (°C)	36.6 (2.6)	40.4 (4.7)	48.0 (8.9)	57.0 (13.9)	65.7 (18.7)	73.1 (22.8)	76.6 (24.8)	75.4 (24.1)	69.6 (20.9)	58.5 (14.7)	47.1 (8.4)	39.9 (4.4)	57.3 (14.1)
Mean daily minimum °F (°C)	27.1 (−2.7)	30.1 (−1.1)	36.2 (2.3)	44.7 (7.1)	54.5 (12.5)	63.0 (17.2)	66.9 (19.4)	65.2 (18.4)	58.6 (14.8)	46.6 (8.1)	35.6 (2.0)	30.9 (−0.6)	46.6 (8.1)
Mean minimum °F (°C)	7.7 (−13.5)	10.7 (−11.8)	18.4 (−7.6)	29.1 (−1.6)	38.9 (3.8)	52.2 (11.2)	59.0 (15.0)	57.3 (14.1)	46.3 (7.9)	31.6 (−0.2)	20.8 (−6.2)	16.1 (−8.8)	3.4 (−15.9)
Record low °F (°C)	−19 (−28)	−13 (−25)	0 (−18)	21 (−6)	31 (−1)	41 (5)	49 (9)	46 (8)	35 (2)	24 (−4)	14 (−10)	−4 (−20)	−19 (−28)
Average precipitation inches (mm)	4.05 (103)	4.49 (114)	4.88 (124)	4.44 (113)	3.75 (95)	4.53 (115)	4.73 (120)	3.33 (85)	3.24 (82)	2.76 (70)	3.37 (86)	4.57 (116)	48.14 (1,223)
Average snowfall inches (cm)	2.1 (5.3)	2.9 (7.4)	2.0 (5.1)	0.0 (0.0)	0.0 (0.0)	0.0 (0.0)	0.0 (0.0)	0.0 (0.0)	0.0 (0.0)	0.0 (0.0)	0.2 (0.51)	1.6 (4.1)	8.8 (22)
Average precipitation days (≥ 0.01 in)	12.2	12.6	12.9	11.4	12.4	12.2	12.5	10.0	8.9	9.0	9.4	12.2	135.7
Average snowy days (≥ 0.1 in)	1.7	1.8	0.8	0.1	0.0	0.0	0.0	0.0	0.0	0.0	0.1	1.1	5.6
Source: NOAA

== Demographics ==
Historical population
Census	Pop.	Note	%±
1860	500		—
1870	950		90.0%
1880	1,350		42.1%
1890	1,999		48.1%
1900	2,973		48.7%
1910	4,007		34.8%
1920	5,875		46.6%
1930	7,305		24.3%
1940	8,050		10.2%
1950	13,019		61.7%
1960	21,267		63.4%
1970	20,318		−4.5%
1980	19,570		−3.7%
1990	21,385		9.3%
2000	24,965		16.7%
2010	29,137		16.7%
2020	30,431		4.4%
2025 (est.)	33,517	▲	10.1%

=== Racial and ethnic composition ===
Morristown city, Tennessee – Racial and ethnic composition Note: the US Census treats Hispanic/Latino as an ethnic category. This table excludes Latinos from the racial categories and assigns them to a separate category. Hispanics/Latinos may be of any race.
Race / Ethnicity (NH = Non-Hispanic)	Pop 2000	Pop 2010	Pop 2020	% 2000	% 2010	% 2020
White alone (NH)	19,957	20,637	19,067	79.94%	70.83%	62.66%
Black or African American alone (NH)	1,843	1,827	1,605	7.38%	6.27%	5.27%
Native American or Alaska Native alone (NH)	56	54	65	0.22%	0.19%	0.21%
Asian alone (NH)	165	233	453	0.66%	0.80%	1.49%
Native Hawaiian or Pacific Islander alone (NH)	18	44	254	0.07%	0.15%	0.83%
Other race alone (NH)	55	39	70	0.22%	0.13%	0.23%
Mixed race or Multiracial (NH)	268	560	1,136	1.07%	1.92%	3.73%
Hispanic or Latino (any race)	2,603	5,743	7,781	10.43%	19.71%	25.57%
Total	24,965	29,137	30,431	100.00%	100.00%	100.00%

=== 2020 census ===
As of the 2020 census, Morristown had a population of 30,431, 11,850 households, and 6,985 families residing in the city.

Racial composition as of the 2020 census
Race	Number	Percent
White	20,726	68.1%
Black or African American	1,691	5.6%
American Indian and Alaska Native	373	1.2%
Asian	462	1.5%
Native Hawaiian and Other Pacific Islander	284	0.9%
Some other race	4,070	13.4%
Two or more races	2,825	9.3%

As of the 2020 census, the median age was 36.4 years; 25.5% of residents were under the age of 18 and 17.3% were 65 years of age or older. For every 100 females there were 92.2 males, and for every 100 females age 18 and over there were 88.2 males age 18 and over.

As of the 2020 census, 99.0% of residents lived in urban areas, while 1.0% lived in rural areas.

As of the 2020 census, there were 11,850 households in Morristown, of which 33.1% had children under the age of 18 living in them. Of all households, 38.6% were married-couple households, 19.2% were households with a male householder and no spouse or partner present, and 33.6% were households with a female householder and no spouse or partner present. About 31.6% of all households were made up of individuals and 14.8% had someone living alone who was 65 years of age or older.

As of the 2020 census, there were 12,934 housing units, of which 8.4% were vacant. The homeowner vacancy rate was 2.3% and the rental vacancy rate was 7.9%.

=== 2010 census ===
As of the census of 2010, there was a population of 29,137, with 11,412 households and 7,278 families residing in the city. The population density was 1,194.7 inhabitants per square mile (461.3/km^{2}). There were 12,705 housing units at an average density of 528.1 per square mile (203.9/km^{2}). The racial makeup of the city was 86.52% White, 6.63% African American, 0.87% Asian, 0.20% Pacific Islander, and 2.15% from two or more races. Those of Hispanic or Latino origins were 19.37% of the population.

There were 11,412 households, out of which 22.5% had children under 17 years of age living with them, 45.2% were married couples living together, 11.4% had a female householder with no husband present, and 36.2% were non-families. 31% of all households were made up of individuals, and 11.0% had someone living alone who was 65 years of age or older. The average household size was 2.47 and the average family size was 3.07.

In the city, the population was spread out, with 24.85% under 17 years of age, 9.45% from 18 to 24, 26.5% from 25 to 44, 23.2% from 45 to 64, and 16% who were 65 years of age or older. The median age was 36 years. For every 100 females, there were 91.2 males. For every 100 females age 18 and over, there were 91.9 males.

The median income for a household in the city was $27,005, and the median income for a family was $33,391. Males had a median income of $26,724 versus $20,515 for females. The per capita income for the city was $15,894. About 14.6% of families and 19.2% of the population were below the poverty line, including 24.9% of those under age 18 and 17.3% of those age 65 or over.

== Economy ==
Being centrally located in the East Tennessee region, Morristown serves at the hub for a labor market area pulling most of its labor force from a surrounding seven-county area of 337,000 people. Morristown and its metropolitan area in 2019 was reported to have a gross metropolitan product of US$5.1 billion.

The town is also home to a National Weather Service forecast office serving much of East Tennessee as well as several southwestern mountain counties in the neighboring states of Virginia and North Carolina.

=== Top employers ===
According to a March 2021 survey by the Morristown Area Chamber of Commerce, the top 15 employers in the city are:

#	Employer	# of Employees
1	Hamblen County Department of Education	1,284
2	Koch Foods	1,100
3	MAHLE Powertrain	1,015
4	Team Technologies	853
5	Arconic	833
6	Walmart	749
7	Walters State Community College	743
8	Morristown-Hamblen Healthcare System	716
9	JTEKT	693
10	Rich Products	540
11	Tuff Torq Corporation	500
12	Food City	422
13	Healthstar Physicians	373
14	Otics USA Inc.	366
15	City of Morristown	338

=== Real estate ===
As of August 2020, Morristown has seen a high demand for both single-family and multi-family residential developments. Morristown reported a 110% increase in residential construction in the city's annual economic and community development report in 2020.

A study by Middle Tennessee State University found that the Morristown metropolitan area saw an 8.1% increase in housing prices in the third quarter of 2019 compared to the same period in 2018.

As of 2010, the median price for a home in the Morristown-Hamblen area was $125,600, compared with $142,000 in the Knoxville metropolitan area, and $177,900 nationally.

In 2010, the Morristown-Hamblen area was home to over 1,000 businesses, employing over 25,000 people. Total property tax revenue was almost equally divided amongst residential, commercial, and industrial properties, with residential property tax supplying 50.1%, commercial at 26.1%, and industrial at 20.1%.

=== Manufacturing ===
Morristown is considered to be one of the largest manufacturing and industrial hubs in the state of Tennessee. There are several industrial parks located in the eastern, western and southern parts of the city, and over 100 manufacturers have based their facilities in Morristown, ranging from food processing, aerospace technology, machine and parts production, plastics engineering, and many other industries.

In 2019, the Morristown area was reported to be home to 109 manufacturing companies, with projections showing Morristown could gain 3,000 jobs and over $600,000,000 in investment in the manufacturing sector alone by the year 2024.

Morristown's manufacturing market employs nearly 10,000 or 24% of the workforce in Hamblen County, and an extra 11,000 commuting from surrounding counties such as Jefferson, Grainger, Cocke, and Hawkins for employment.

=== Retail ===
Morristown is considered a hub for retail, with the indoor regional College Square Mall serving an area of 300,000 people, and a diverse array of locally owned shops and franchised stores in retail developments dispersed around Morristown and in its downtown area. In 2016, the city saw nearly $1.4 billion in retail sales.

== Arts and culture ==
=== Festivals ===
There are several annual festivals and events held in Morristown, some of the more notable events include:

- Morristown Strawberry Festival – festival held every May celebrating strawberries harvested in Morristown.
- Morristown Craft Beer Festival – Craft beer festival with live music held at the Morristown Farmers Market every September.
- Mountain Makins Festival – Arts and crafts festival held at the Rose Center every October.

=== Historic sites ===
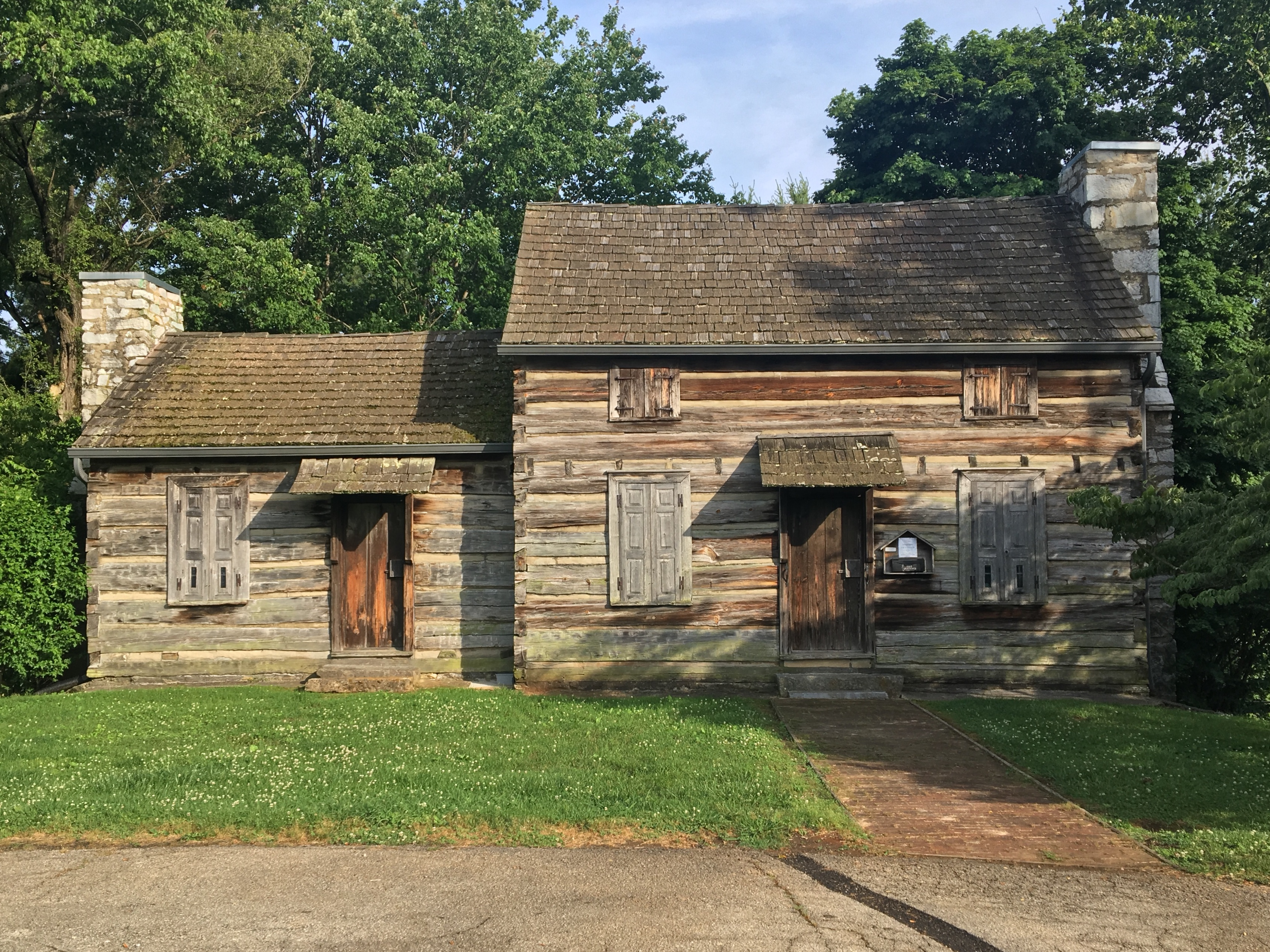
Crockett Tavern Museum in East Morristown, which is replica of the original tavern owned by John Crockett and boyhood home of Davy Crockett on the original site.

- Bethesda Presbyterian Church
- Crockett Tavern Museum
- General Longstreet's Headquarters Museum
- Morristown Main Street Historic District
- Rose Center

== Sports ==
=== Minor league baseball ===
Morristown hosted several Minor League Baseball teams from 1910 to 1961 at Sherwood Park. The Morristown Jobbers became charter members of the Southeastern League in 1910. The Jobbers continued in the Appalachian League in 1911 and played each season through 1914. From 1923 to 1925, the city's entry in the league was called the Morristown Roosters. In 1948, the Morristown Red Sox became charter members of the Mountain States League in which they played through 1954. The team won the league championship in their first season. The Red Sox folded early in the 1954 season and were replaced in the league by the Morristown Reds. The Morristown Cubs, the city's final professional baseball team played in the Appalachian League from 1959 to 1961 and won the 1959 pennant.

=== Little League ===
Little League softball and baseball in Morristown dates back to the late 20th century. In 1985 and 1987, Morristown had baseball teams qualify for the Little League World Series; the 1985 team finished in third place. The Morristown teams are two of eleven Tennessee teams that have advanced to the series in Williamsport, Pennsylvania. Morristown would see podium placement by the 2000s, placing fourth in the 2006 Little League Softball World Series, and winning it the following year.

== Parks and recreation ==
Municipal and county recreation areas include Cherokee Park, Frank Lorino, Fred Miller, and Fulton-Hill. Public access for boating and swimming to Cherokee Reservoir is available in the northern area of the city and county. Morristown is also home to several golf and disc golf courses.

== Government ==
Morristown uses the mayor-council government system, which was established in 1855 when the city was incorporated. Morristown is governed by a seven-member city council composed of the mayor and six council members, four members are elected from single-member districts and two members are elected at-large for the entire city. The citizens elect the mayor to a four-year term and the six council members to two-year terms.

The City Council meets every first and third Tuesday of each month at 5:00 p.m. in the Council Chambers at the City Center building.

Morristown is represented in the Tennessee House of Representatives in the 10th district by Representative Rick Eldridge, a Republican.

In the Tennessee State Senate, Morristown is represented by the 1st district by Senator Steve Southerland, also a Republican.

Morristown is represented in the United States House of Representatives by Republican Diana Harshbarger of the 1st congressional district.

== Education ==
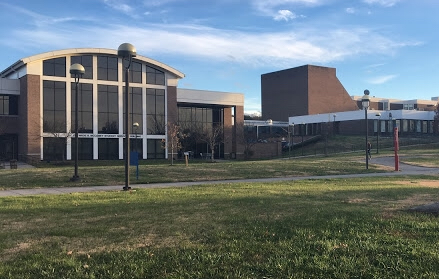
Main campus of Walters State Community College in East Morristown

=== Public schools ===
Public schools in Morristown are operated by the Hamblen County Department of Education. There are four middle schools: East Ridge, Lincoln, Meadowview, and Westview. Morristown has two high schools: Morristown-Hamblen High School East and Morristown-Hamblen High School West.

=== Colleges ===
The main campus of Walters State Community College is located in Morristown.

The main campus and the aviation technology expansion campus of the Tennessee College of Applied Technology - Morristown, are located in Morristown.

Satellite campuses of King University and Tusculum University are located in Morristown. Carson-Newman University is located 7 miles from Morristown in Jefferson City, TN.

== Media ==
=== Newspaper ===
- Citizen Tribune, daily news publication for Morristown and its greater area in operation since 1966.

== Infrastructure ==
=== Healthcare ===
Morristown is home to the Morristown-Hamblen Hospital. The hospital has a 167-room capacity with 23 designated for emergency use. It is considered the main healthcare center in the Morristown metropolitan area.

=== Utilities ===
Morristown Utilities System (MUS) provides electricity, water, sewer, and fiber broadband internet to the City of Morristown and several eastern Hamblen County residents and businesses. It provides services to approximately 15,000 customers.

Appalachian Electric Cooperative (AEC), a utilities company based out of New Market in neighboring Jefferson County, provides electricity and fiber broadband internet for western and northern portions of Morristown, portions of Hamblen County, Jefferson County (including New Market, Baneberry, Jefferson City, Dandridge, and White Pine), and Grainger County (including Bean Station and Rutledge). AEC, as of June 2018, provides services to 46,000 customers.

=== Transportation ===
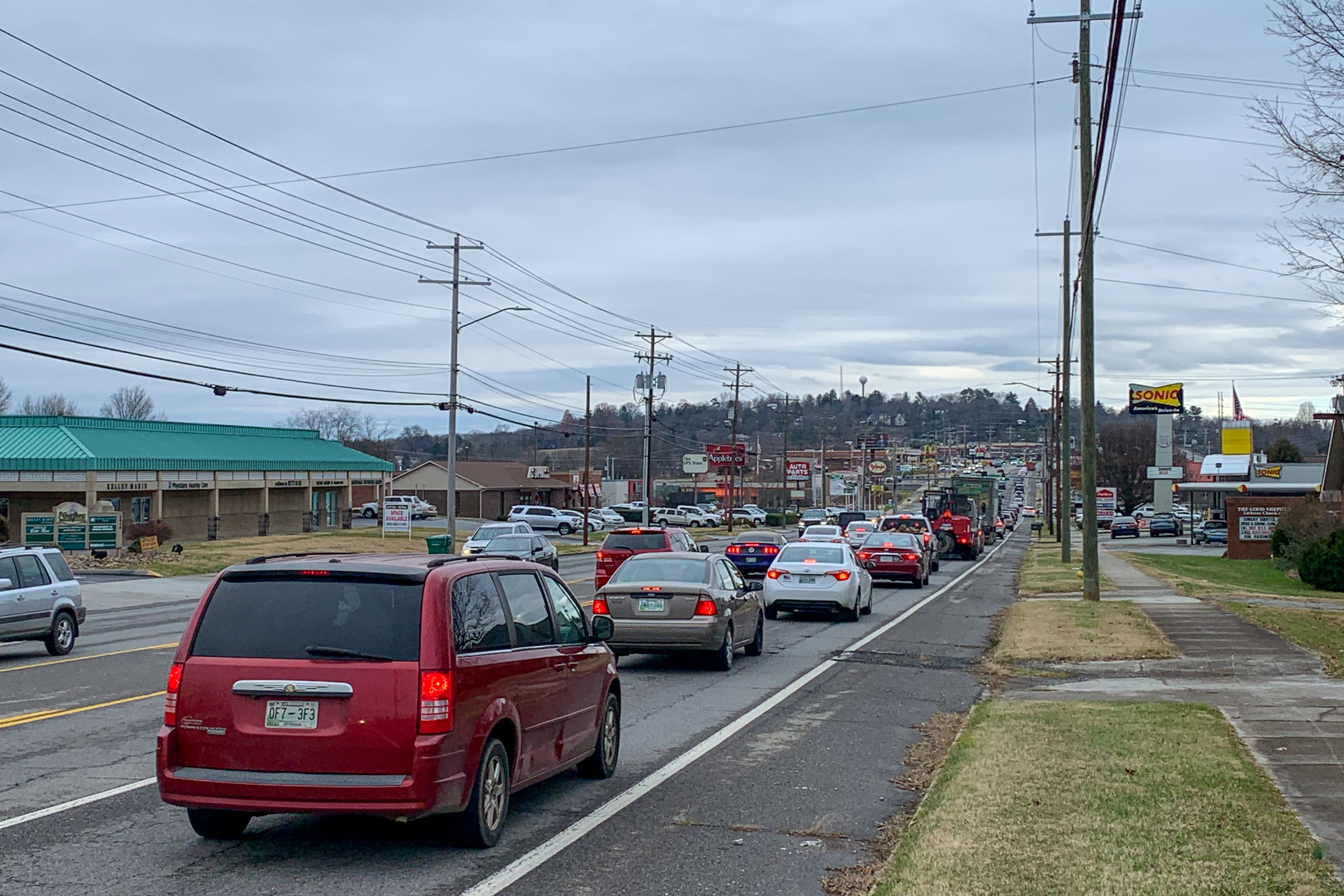
Morristown is primarily populated with car-dependent stroad infrastructure.

Morristown is an automobile-dependent city, almost entirely reliant on roadway infrastructure to support its large commuting-base residing inside the city and from surrounding counties.

All U.S. routes, state routes in Morristown, along with I-81, are maintained by the Tennessee Department of Transportation (TDOT) in TDOT Region 1, which consists of 24 counties in East Tennessee. Streets, sidewalks, and greenways in the Morristown-Hamblen area are maintained by either the Hamblen County Highway Department or the City of Morristown Public Works Department.

In 2002, the United States Census Bureau declared the municipalities of Morristown, Jefferson City, White Pine, and portions of unincorporated Hamblen and Jefferson counties as a part of an urbanized area. The Lakeway Area Metropolitan Transportation Planning Organization (LAMPTO) was created following the requirement of a designated MTPO for all urbanized areas in the United States. The LAMPTO plans and coordinates regional transportation projects in Morristown and its urbanized area.

==== Major highways ====
The sole interstate highway serving Morristown is Interstate 81, which connects the city to Interstate 40 in nearby Dandridge to the west, and the Tri-Cities region in northeasternmost Tennessee to the east.

U.S. Route 25E-Tennessee State Route 32 is the principal north–south route in Morristown, and connects the city from Interstate 81 at exit 8, to U.S. Route 11W in Bean Station. US 25E also extends to Interstate 75 in Corbin, Kentucky, serving as a popular alternate route of I-75 regarding construction and congestion in Knoxville. The route is given the designation Appalachian Development Highway System Corridor S from I-81 in Morristown to the Tennessee-Kentucky state line at the Cumberland Gap, and as High-Priority Corridor 12 of the National Highway System.

U.S. Route 11E-Tennessee State Route 34 is the principal east–west route in Morristown, paralleling the I-40-I-81 corridor, and connecting the city to Jefferson City to the west, and Greeneville to the east.

Tennessee State Route 160 is a bypass route of US 11E, and serves the city with access to I-81 at exit 12, US 25E, and US 11E.

Tennessee State Route 66 is a connector route to serving Morristown, connecting the city to I-81 exit 4 in White Pine, and to SR 160 and US 11E in west Morristown.

==== Principal highways ====
- I-81
- US 11E (Morris Boulevard, West Andrew Johnson Highway)
- US 25E (Davy Crockett Parkway)
- SR 32 (concurrent to US 25E)
- SR 34 (concurrent to US 11E)
- SR 66 (Doctor Martin Luther King Jr. Parkway, East Andrew Johnson Highway, First North Street)
- SR 160 (Governor Dewitt Clinton Senter Parkway, Air Park Boulevard, Enka Highway)

==== Major surface routes ====
- SR 113
- SR 341 (Alpha Valley Home Road)
- SR 342 (Panther Creek Road)
- SR 343 (Cumberland Street, Buffalo Trail)
- SR 344 (Old Russellville Pike)
- SR 474 (Merchants Greene Boulevard)

=== Rail access ===
Norfolk Southern Railway operates freight transport throughout Morristown along several lines, including the Crescent Corridor. The Southern Railway used to serve Johnson City with several trains: the Birmingham Special (ended, 1970), the Pelican (ended, 1970) and the Tennessean (ended, 1968).

=== Mass transit ===
Public transportation is provided by Lakeway Transit. Three fixed bus routes connect to the downtown area, most residential areas, and major shopping centers throughout the city. Lakeway Transit operates using passenger fares, and city, state, federal funding.

=== Airport ===
Morristown and the surrounding area is served by Morristown Regional Airport (IATA:MOR), a 160-acre (65 ha) airport equipped with one 5,717-foot (1,743 m) runway. The airport is located southwest of Morristown's central business district near the neighborhood of Alpha, and is operated by the municipal government.

== Notable people ==
- Ermal Allen, professional football player and coach
- Darrius Blevins, professional football player
- James E. Bruce, Kentucky state representative
- Arnold W. Bunch Jr., U.S. Air Force four-star general and commander of Air Force Materiel Command
- Davy Crockett, pioneer; grew up in Morristown, born in nearby Greene County
- Mike Ford, former NASCAR crew chief for Denny Hamlin
- Elaine Hendrix, actress, dancer, activist
- Tim Horner, professional wrestler, politician
- Evelyn Bryan Johnson, aviator, Morristown Regional Airport manager
- Josiah Leming, American Idol contestant, singer-songwriter
- Brett Martin, professional baseball player
- William McFarland, U.S. representative from Tennessee, mayor of Morristown
- Rickey Parkey, champion boxer
- Gideon Morris, trans-Appalachian pioneer and founder of Morristown
- Frankie Randall, world champion boxer
- Randy Sanders, former quarterback for Morristown East High School and the Tennessee Volunteers; former head football coach of East Tennessee State University
- Dewitt Clinton Senter, governor of Tennessee
- Joe Shipley, former professional baseball player and head coach of the East Tennessee State University baseball team
- James Stewart, professional football player
- Uncle Am Stuart, early country and folk music fiddle player
- Nicholas Todd Sutton, serial killer
- Jane Wagner, playwright and actress
- Herbert S. Walters, U.S. senator from Tennessee, namesake of Walters State Community College
- Calvin Ward, soldier, Medal of Honor recipient
- John A. Willis, Theatre World and film book editor, theatre awards producer, actor, and educator
