= Crockett Tavern Museum =

- U.S. National Register of Historic Places
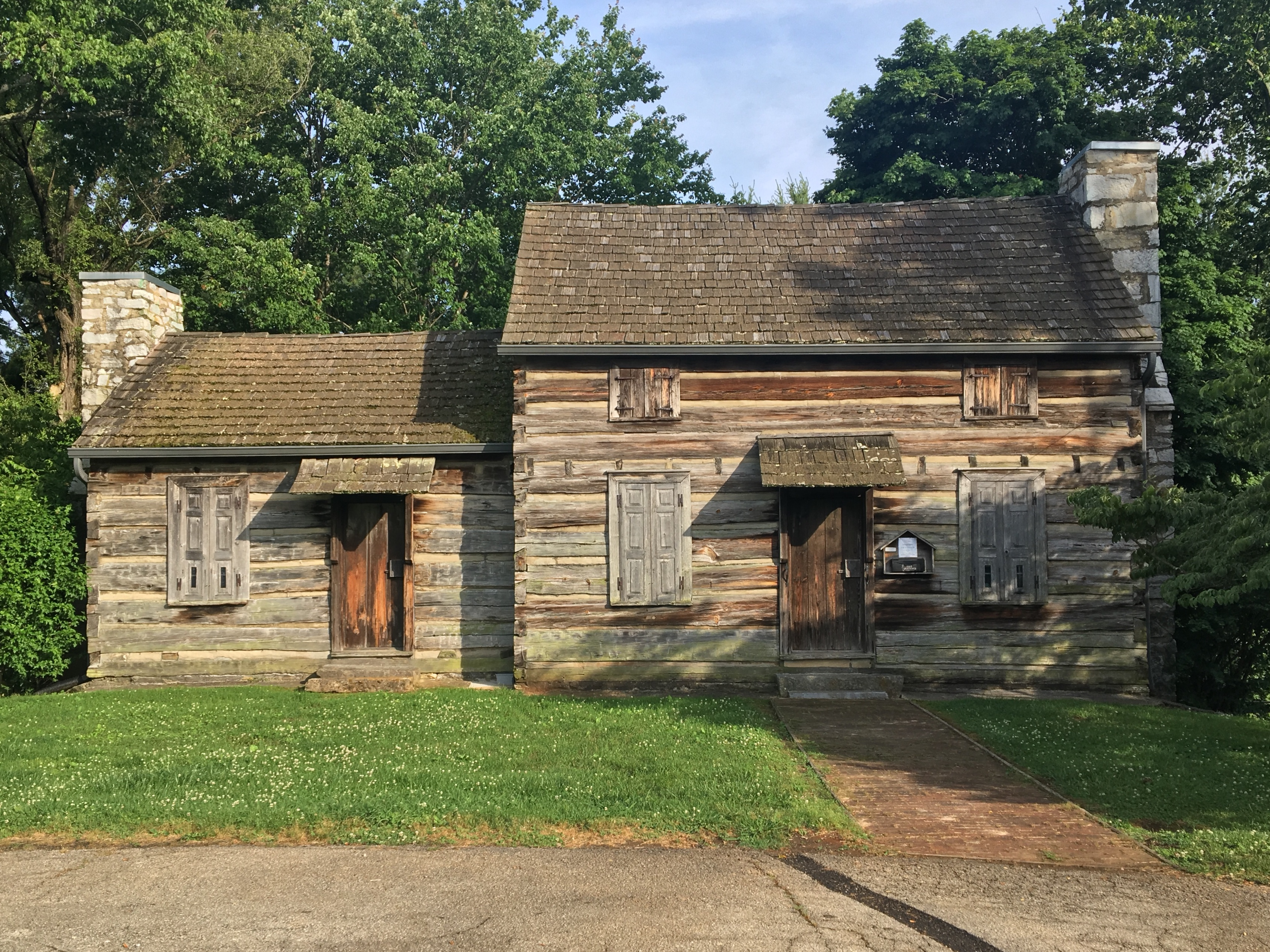

- Location within Tennessee Location within the United States
- Location: 2002 Morningside Dr, Morristown, Tennessee 37814
- Coordinates: 36°13′17.004″N 83°16′3.072″W
- Built: 1950s
- NRHP reference No.: 13000948
- Added to NRHP: December 18, 2013

The Crockett Tavern Museum is a history museum in Morristown, Tennessee, that commemorates the American folk hero David "Davy" Crockett. The museum was started in 1955, when a popular craze over the legacy of Davy Crockett was at its peak, and opened in 1958. It was listed on the National Register of Historic Places in December 2013.

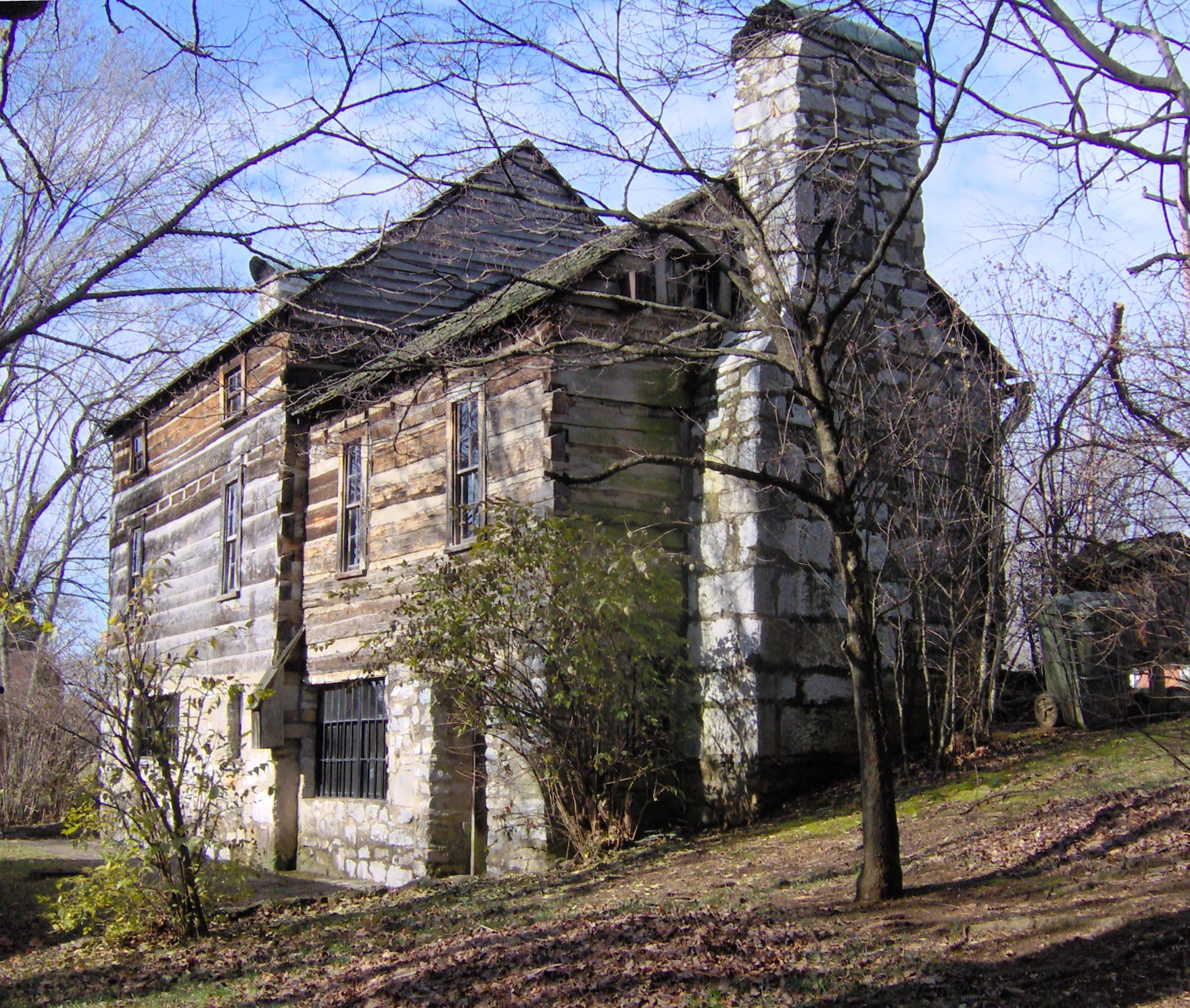
The rear of the building.

The museum's main building is a log cabin structure built in the 1950s as a representation of the tavern that Davy Crockett's father, John Crockett, established in 1794 at the approximate location of the modern museum.

The museum is operated by the Hamblen County chapter of the Association for the Preservation of Tennessee Antiquities.
