= Southern Limestone/Dolomite Valleys & Low Rolling Hills =

Level IV ecoregion in the continental United States

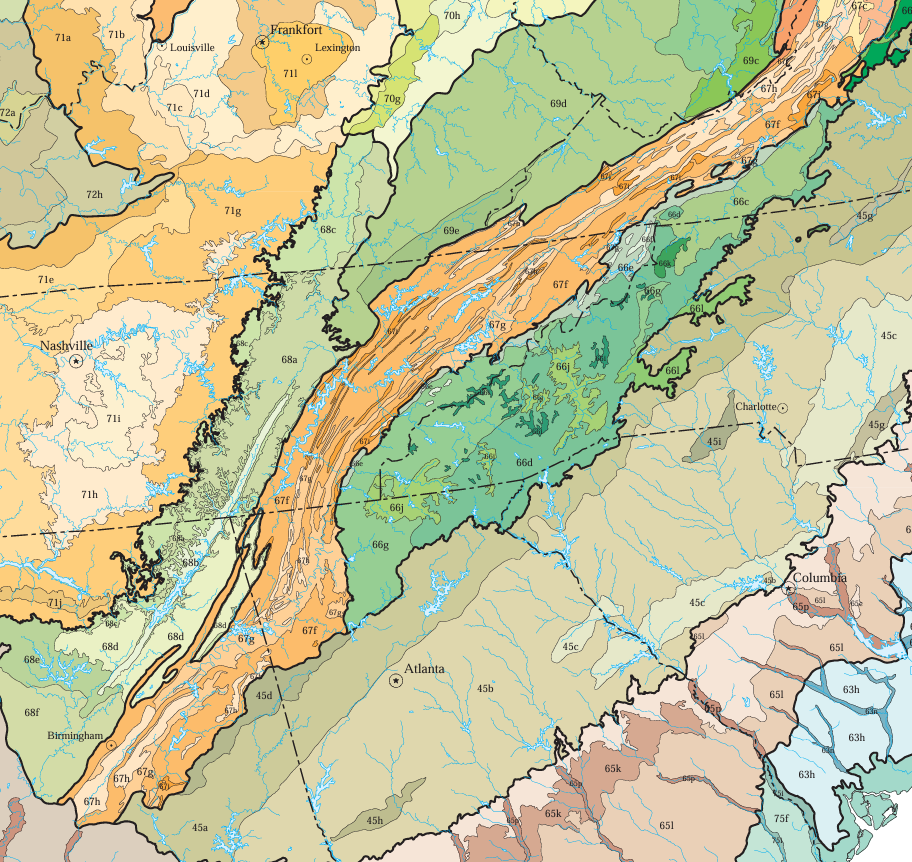
Southern Limestone-Dolomite Valleys & Low Rolling Hills ecoregion (67f, medium-dark orange) coursing through the states of Virginia, Tennessee, Georgia and Alabama.

The Southern Limestone/Dolomite Valleys & Low Rolling Hills (Ecoregion 67f) is one of the 99 Level IV ecoregions in the continental United States, as defined by a collaboration between the EPA, USGS and USDA. It covers portions of Southwest Virginia (beginning just south of the Shenandoah Valley), East Tennessee, Northwest Georgia, and Northeast Alabama. This Level IV ecoregion is nested within the larger Level I, II, and III ecoregions as follows:

- Level IV: Southern Limestone/Dolomite Valleys & Low Rolling Hills (Ecoregion 67f)
- Level III: Ridge & Valley (Ecoregion 67)
- For levels II and I, the EPA publishes the system created by the Commission for Environmental Cooperation (CEC) discussed below.

== Alternative ecoregion ==
The North American Commission for Environmental Cooperation (CEC), publishes ecoregions for the entire North American continent with the following arrangement:

- Level III: Ridge and Valley (Ecoregion 8.4.1). This ecoregion correlates with the EPA/USGS/USDA Level III Ecoregion 67.
- Level II: Ozark, Ouachita-Appalachian Forests (Ecoregion 8.4). This ecoregion covers two geographically separated units, one within the Appalachian Ridge & Valley and the other covering the Ozark-Ouachita region.
- Level I: Eastern Temperate Forests (Ecoregion 8.0)

This article follows EPA in using Levels III and IV as published by the EPA, USGS and USDA, and the Levels II and I as published by the CEC.

== Geology ==
The Southern Limestone/Dolomite Valleys & Low Rolling Hills ecoregion spans 5324 square miles and includes rolling hills and valleys, and in the northern portions some steep ridges. It is home to caves, springs, and low gradient streams with bedrock, cobble, gravel and sandy bottoms. Elevation ranges from 700 to 2000 feet above sea level.

Bedrock includes cherty clay solution residuum from the Quaternary period, and dolomite and limestone from the Ordovician period. Soils are from the ultisols (paleudults) order (red clay), including Fullerton, Dewey, Decatur, Bodine, and Waynesboro soil series. Soil temperature is thermic (15 °C to 22 °C) and soil moisture is udic.

The Southern Limestone/Dolomite Valleys & Low Rolling Hills includes portions of the New River (Ohio River tributary) in Virginia, and various tributaries of the Tennessee River, including Powell River (including Norris Lake), Clinch River, Holston River (including Cherokee Lake), Nolichucky River, Upper Tennessee River (including Fort Loudon Lake), Little Tennessee River, and Hiwassee River. The initial course of the Tennessee River follows the south-southwest direction of the Southern Limestone/Dolomite Valleys & Low Rolling Hills, before the Tennessee River turns west and exits the ecoregion. The ecoregion extends farther southwest into Georgia and includes the Tennessee River tributary, Chickamauga Creek, and into Alabama, where it encompasses various other Tennessee River tributaries. Whereas the majority of the ecoregion contributes water to the Gulf of Mexico via the Mississippi River, the far southern end of the ecoregion in Alabama contributes water in a more southerly direct route into the Gulf of Mexico.

== Ecology ==
Native vegetation includes Appalachian oak forest (mixed oak, hickory, pine, poplar, birch, maple); bottomland oak and mesophytic forests; and cedar barrens. As of 2023, the species identification app iNaturalist included observations within this ecoregion of 8,331 species ("Research Grade" verified species, both native and nonnative), including 2,468 plants, 323 birds, 68 amphibians, 52 reptiles, 61 mammals, 184 fish, 129 mollusks, 241 arachnids, 3,816 insects, 834 fungi, and 19 protozoa.

== Human ecology ==
Common land uses include cropland and pasture, mixed forest, some pine plantations, rural residential, urban and industrial.

Major cities built within the Southern Limestone/Dolomite Valleys & Low Rolling Hills ecoregion include Roanoke, VA, Johnson City, TN, Knoxville, TN, Chattanooga, TN, and Birmingham, AL.
