= Morristown Main Street Historic District =

Historic district in Morristown, Tennessee

- U.S. National Register of Historic Places
- U.S. Historic district
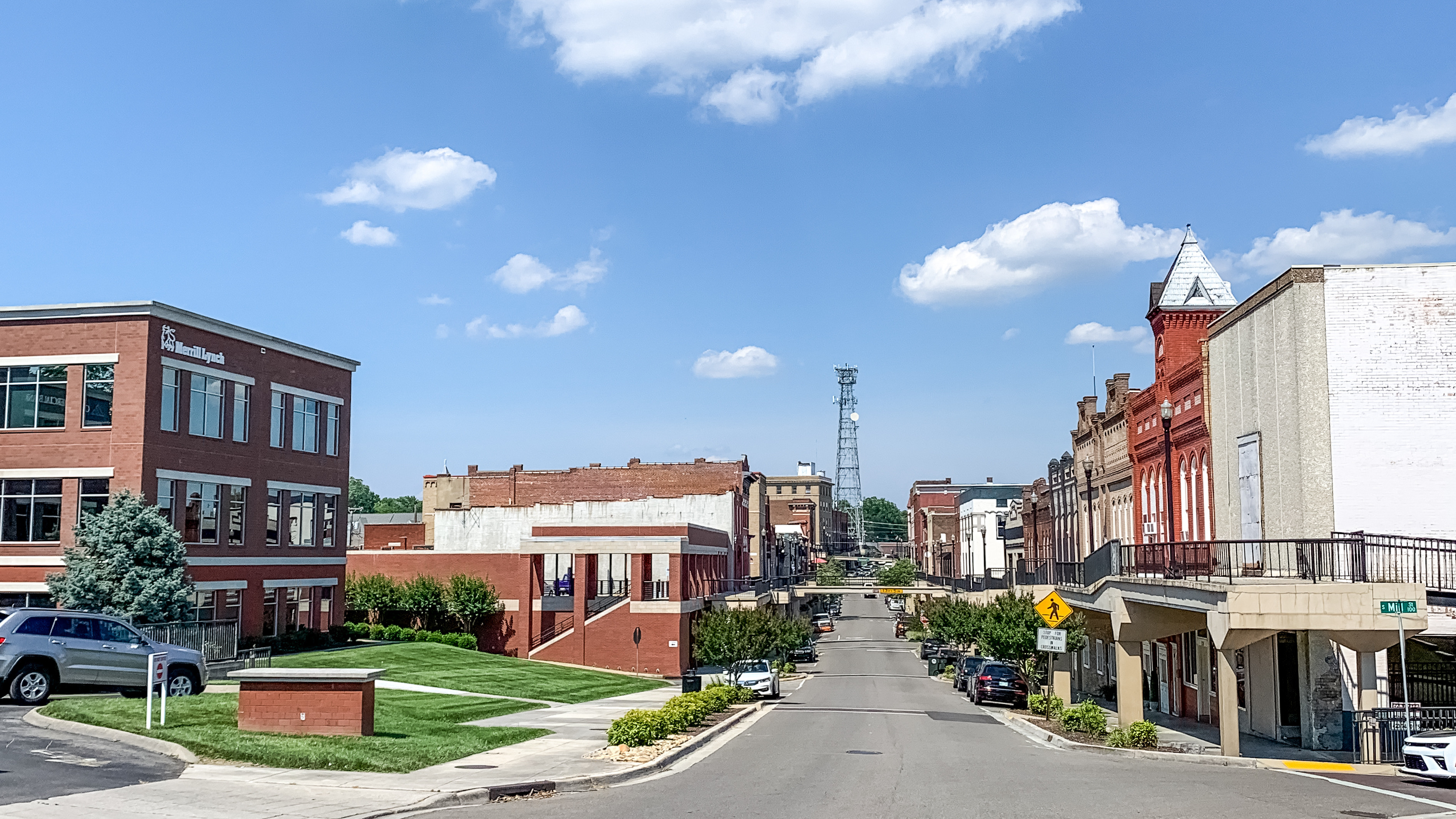
- Main Street, looking east

- Location within Tennessee Location within the United States
- Map of the Morristown Main Street Historic District
- Location: 101-119 E. Main, 200-243 W. Main, 113-133, 118-134 N. Henry, 111-121 N. Cumberland, 110-128 S. Cumberland Streets., Morristown, Tennessee, United States
- Coordinates: 36.2132°N 83.2935°W
- Area: 8.2 acres (3.3 ha)
- Built: 1875–1967
- Architect: Multiple
- Engineer: Multiple
- Architectural style: 19th–20th Century Commercial, Classical Revival, Neo-Classical Revival, Romanesque, Italianate, Queen Anne, Contemporary, Brutalist
- Website: Morristown Main Street Historic District
- NRHP reference No.: 16000120
- Added to NRHP: March 22, 2016

- U.S. Post Office (Henry Street Station)
- U.S. National Register of Historic Places
- U.S. Historic district – Contributing property
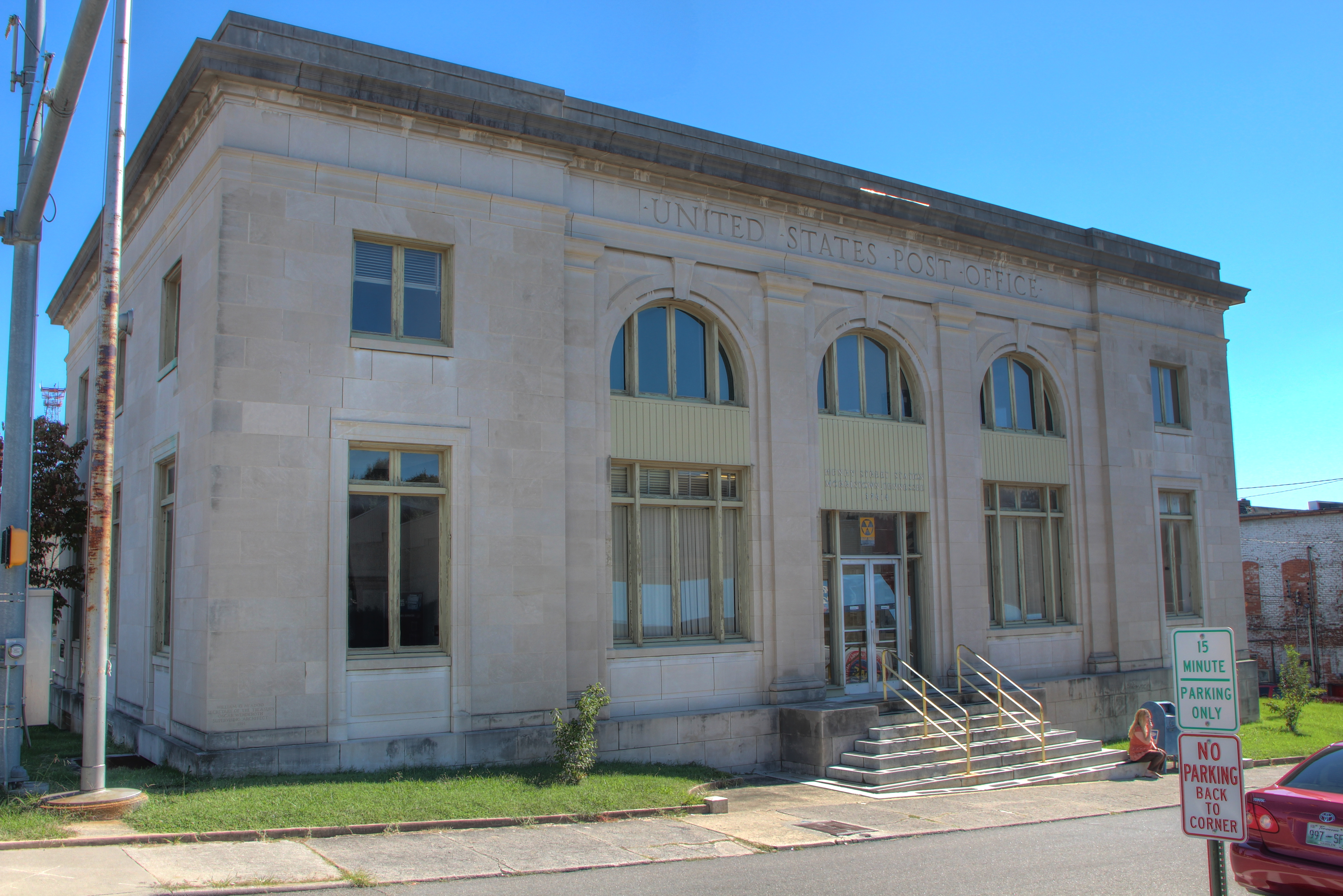
- Location: 134 North Henry Street, Morristown, Tennessee
- Built: 1915
- Architect: Oscar Wenderoth
- Architectural style: Classical revival
- Part of: Morristown Main Street Historic District (ID16000120)
- NRHP reference No.: 74002253

Significant dates
- Added to NRHP: April 25, 1983
- Designated CP: March 22, 2016

The Morristown Main Street Historic District is a National Register of Historic Places' historic district in Morristown, Tennessee, United States. It is primarily focused on the central business district area of Morristown.

== Overview ==
The historic district established by the City of Morristown to safeguard, preserve, and protect unique and historically significant structures in the city's downtown area. It comprises mostly commercial buildings along Main Street, and on Henry and Cumberland Streets, which intersect Main Street. The Henry Street Station Post Office is a contributing property to the district, and is an individually listed National Historic Landmark.

The historic district is administered by the City of Morristown and the Crossroads Downtown Partnership, 501(c) non-profit organization dedicated towards the redevelopment of downtown Morristown.

== History ==
Morristown's Main Street area, measuring approximately 1 square mile (2.6 km^{2}), arose from the intersection of two railroad lines since the late 19th century. In 1962, Turkey Creek, which bisects the street, flooded and damaged the downtown commercial district. A suburban shopping mall on the city's west side also jeopardized businesses downtown, so the city developed a plan to modernize Main Street by creating an "overhead sidewalk", enabling businesses to form on the second floor of existing buildings while serving as a canopy for passage below. Skymart, as it became known, was inspired by the centuries-old streets and buildings of the Chester Rows area in Chester, England, something architect Hubert Bebb had experienced first-hand. Building owners spent nearly $2 million ($16 million today) upgrading their properties and linking them to ramps, while the government contributed over $5 million to build the elevated walkways. The underground channel for Turkey Creek was also enlarged and rerouted. The project was completed in 1967. The overhead sidewalk system still stands in the downtown area, and is the only walkway system of its kind remaining in the United States.

On March 22, 2016, Main Street and the rest of Morristown's downtown district was officially listed on the National Register of Historic Places as a historic district after approval from the Tennessee Historical Commission and the National Park Service.

Morristown is embarking on a resurrection of the Skymart as a social and commercial hub. It has been made a key element in a greenway master plan for the region. In an effort to renew public interest, city officials, the Crossroads Downtown Partnership, and the Morristown Area Chamber of Commerce hold events in the city's downtown or the "Skymart District" throughout the year, mainly during the warmer months of May to September.
