= Rose Center (Tennessee) =

- Rose School
- U.S. National Register of Historic Places
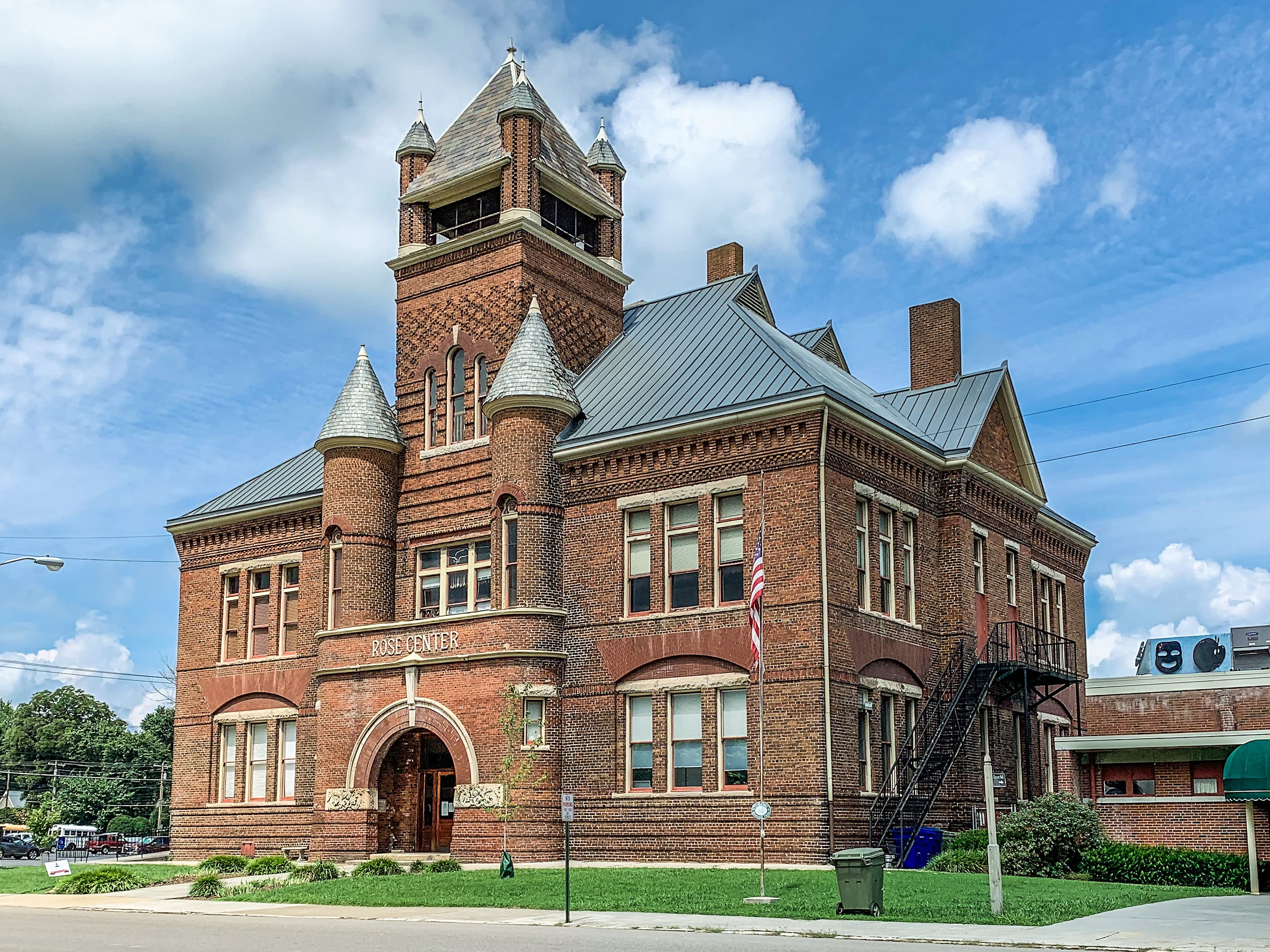

- Location within Tennessee Location within the United States
- Location: Jackson and W. 2nd North Sts., Morristown, Tennessee
- Coordinates: 36°12′47″N 83°17′55″W
- Area: 1 acre (0.40 ha)
- Built: 1892
- Architect: Beaver & Hoffmeister; Cobble, M.
- Architectural style: Late Victorian
- NRHP reference No.: 76001778
- Added to NRHP: October 18, 1976

Rose Center is a community cultural center in Morristown, Tennessee, housed in the Rose School, which was built in 1892 as Morristown's first coeducational public high school.

== History ==
Rose School was built in 1892. It was named after the judge and former Confederate colonel James G. Rose, who was chairman of the school board when planning began for the new school. It was used as Morristown's combined elementary school and high school until the end of the 1916 school year, when the high school relocated to a separate building. The school continued to operate as an elementary school until 1975. After the school closed, the red brick building was converted into a museum and cultural center as a community initiative related to the U.S. Bicentennial. Rose School was listed on the National Register of Historic Places in 1976. It is number 76001778, a late Victorian building circa 1875-1899. In 1976, plans were made to convert the land into a parking lot.

== Facility uses and programs ==
The facility is operated by the Rose Center Council for the Arts, a voluntary organization established in 1976. It includes gallery space, meeting rooms, and classrooms, and a separate auditorium. The Rose Center hosts permanent exhibits on local history and related topics, rotating art exhibitions, classes for both children and adults, and a variety of special events. Some of the rooms available to the community for events are the renovated Jean Keener Community Room and the Edith Davis Gallery, which incorporates the historic photographs of the Hal Noe Collection.
