= Robotics =

Design, construction, use, and application of robots

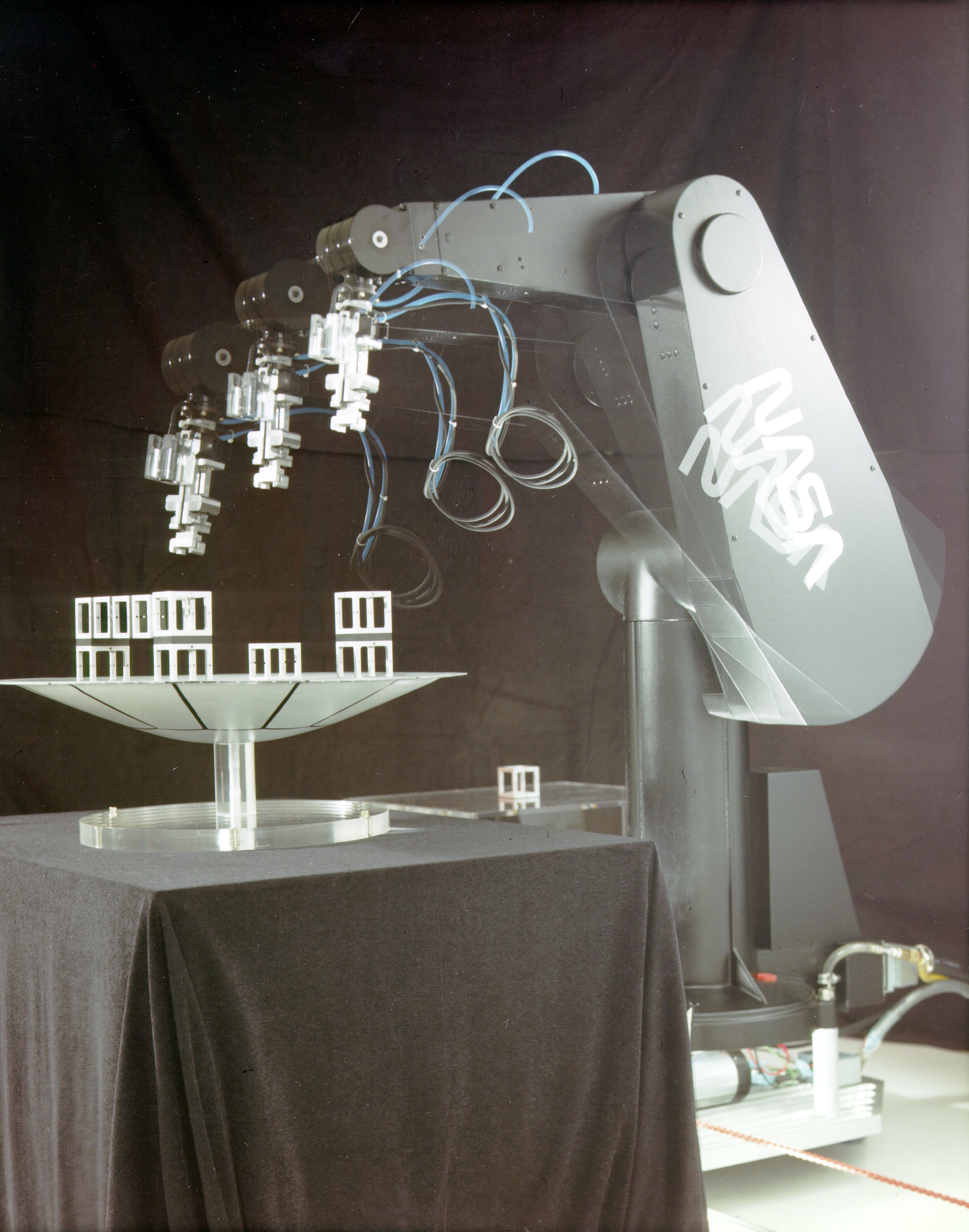
Programmable Universal Machine for Assembly, one of the first industrial robots (1990)

Robotics is the interdisciplinary study and practice of the design, construction, operation, and use of robots. A roboticist is someone who specializes in robotics. Robotics usually combines four aspects of design work: a power source (e.g. a battery), mechanical construction, a control system (electrical circuits), and software (run by remote control or artificial intelligence).

The goal of most robotics is to design machines that can assist humans in various fields, such as agriculture, construction, domestic work, food processing, inventory management, manufacturing, medicine, military, mining, space exploration, and transportation.

Robots impact humans by displacing workers. Some expect this to occur at an increasing rate, leading to proposed solutions such as basic income. Robotics is itself a lucrative business that creates careers, especially for postgraduates. Roboticists often aim to create machines that seem to interface naturally with humans. The field is under active research and development, with areas of interest including robot kinematics and quantum robotics.

== Design ==
Robotics usually combines four aspects of design work to create a robot:

- Power source: Potential energy sources include wired electricity, a battery, and/or petrol.
- Mechanical construction: A physical form or combination of forms is designed to functionally achieve tasks within a given range of environments. This can include locomotive elements such as wheels and caterpillar tracks, as well as hydraulic limbs and manipulators (e.g. hands).
- Control system: Electrical circuits (utilizing components such as diodes and transistors) are used to run software, govern motor movement, and read sensors.
- Software: A program is how a robot decides when or how to do something. Robotic programs can be run by remote control, artificial intelligence (AI), or a hybrid of the two. AI programming is an important part of robotic navigation and human–robot interaction.

=== Power source ===
A mobile robot is ideally powered by lightweight batteries with a high lifetime of recharge cycles, with safety considered both related to active operation and the effects of waste on the environment. A battery-replacement system eliminates downtime during charge cycles. Humanoid robots most commonly run on nickel manganese cobalt–based lithium-ion batteries. Lead–acid batteries are well-established, safe, and long-lived, but relatively large and heavy. Silver–cadmium batteries can be much smaller but have limited recharges and are quite expensive; they are thus mostly used for space and military operations.

Generators, often some type of internal combustion engine, can also be used, but are often mechanically complex and inefficient. A tether can connect a robot to its power supply, saving weight and space but likely stymied by cable-spooling difficulties. Solar power is most effective for space or stationary robots due to a slow charge cycle. Nuclear power is also sometimes utilized in space. Other potential power sources include compressed gases and flywheel energy storage.

=== Mechanical construction ===
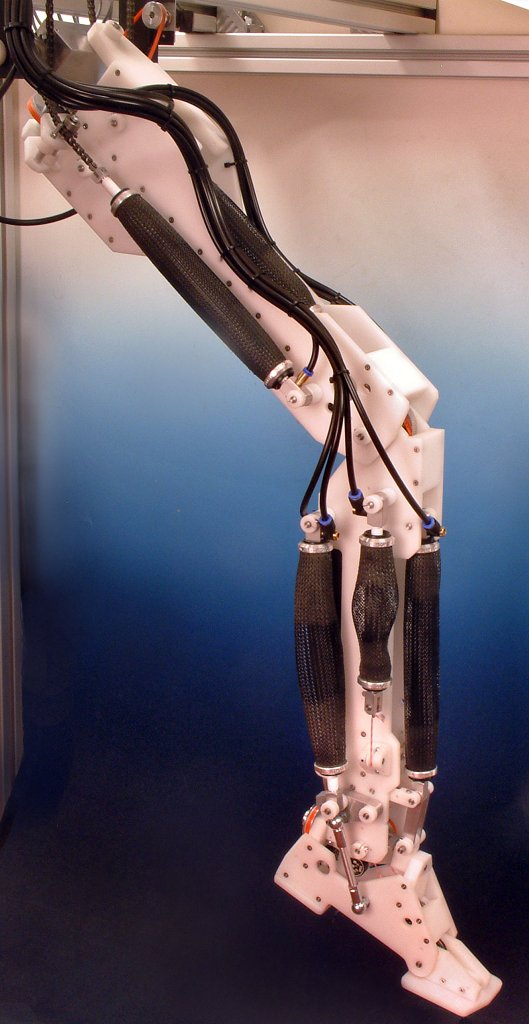
A robotic leg powered by air muscles

Actuators convert stored energy into movement. They are generally limited to the location of a joint, as compared to the muscles of a biological organism, forcing robot designers to be creative to maximize power without breaking parts.

The most popular actuators are electric motors that rotate a wheel or gear and linear actuators that control factory robots. Most robots use electric motors, often brushed and brushless DC motors in portable robots or AC motors in industrial robots and computer numerical control machines (especially in systems with lighter loads and predominantly rotational motion). Meanwhile, linear actuators simply move in and out (being used in industrial applications). They are typically powered by oil or compressed air, but can also be powered by electricity, usually via a motor and a leadscrew. The mechanical rack and pinion is common in large gantry robots.

Recent alternatives to DC motors are piezoelectric motors, including ultrasonic motors, in which tiny piezoceramic elements vibrate many thousands of times per second, causing linear or rotary motion. One type uses the vibration of the piezo elements to step the motor in a circle or a straight line; another type uses the piezo elements to vibrate a nut or drive a screw. The advantages of these motors are nanometer resolution, speed, and force for their size.

Series elastic actuation (SEA) relies on introducing intentional elasticity between the motor actuator and the load for robust force control. Due to the resultant lower reflected inertia, series elastic actuation improves safety during robot interactions or collisions. Further, it provides energy efficiency and shock absorption (mechanical filtering) while reducing excessive wear on the transmission and other components. This approach has successfully been employed in various robots, particularly advanced manufacturing robots and walking humanoid robots. The controller design of a series elastic actuator is most often performed within the passivity framework as it ensures the safety of interaction with unstructured environments.

Pneumatic artificial muscles, also known as air muscles, are special tubes that expand (typically up to 42%) when air is forced inside them; they are used in some robot applications. Muscle wire, also known as shape memory alloy, is a material that contracts (under 5%) when electricity is applied; they have been used for some small robots. Electroactive polymers are a plastic material that can contract substantially (up to 380% activation strain) from electricity and have been used in the facial muscles and arms of humanoid robots, as well as to enable new robots to float, fly, swim or walk. Additionally, elastic carbon nanotubes are a promising experimental artificial muscle technology. The absence of defects in carbon nanotubes enables these filaments to deform elastically by several percent, with energy storage levels of perhaps 10 J/cm^{3} for metal nanotubes. Human biceps could be replaced with wire of this material measuring 8 millimetres (3/8 in) in diameter, feasibly allowing future robots to outperform humans.

==== Locomotion ====
Robots with only one or two wheel(s) can have advantages such as greater efficiency, reduced parts, and navigation through confined areas. A one-wheeled robot balances on a round ball; Carnegie Mellon University's Ballbot is the approximate height and width of a person. Several attempts have also been made to build spherical robots (also known as orb bots or ball bots), which move by spinning a weight inside the ball or rotating outer shells. Two-wheeled balancing robots generally use a gyroscope to detect how much a robot is falling and drive the wheels proportionally up to hundreds of times per second to counterbalance the fall, based on inverted pendulum dynamics. NASA's Robonaut has been mounted to a Segway for a similar effect. Most mobile robots have four wheels or continuous tracks. Six wheels can give better traction in outdoor terrain, while tracks provide even more grip. Tracked wheels are common for outdoor off-road robots, but are difficult to use indoors. A small number of skating robots have been developed, one of which is a multimodal walking and skating device with four legs and unpowered wheels.

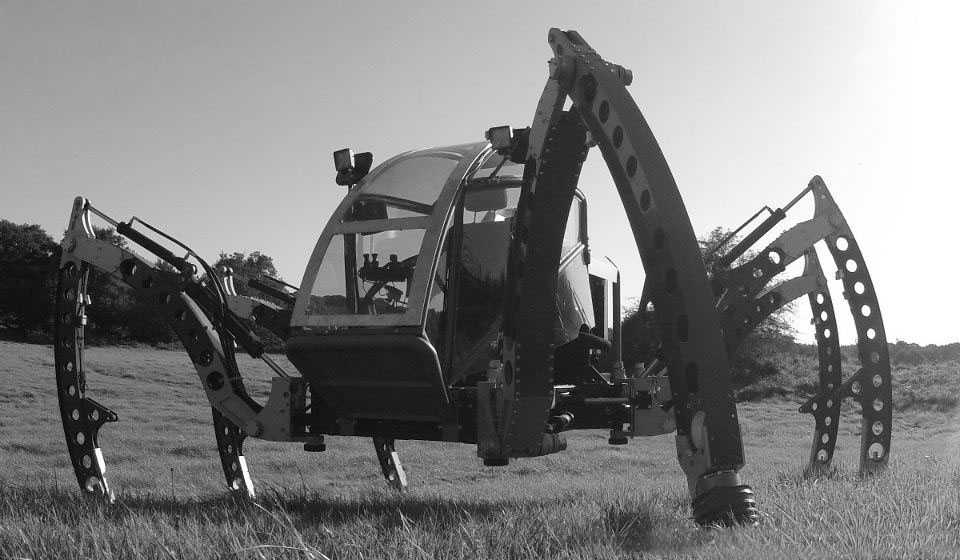
Mantis the spider robot in 2012

Several robots have been made that can walk on two legs, but not yet as reliably as a human. Many other robots have been built that walk on more than two legs, being significantly easier. Walking robots could be used for uneven terrains, providing a high degree of mobility and efficiency, but two-legged robots can currently only handle flat floors or perhaps stairs. Some approaches have included:

- The zero moment point (ZMP) is the algorithm used by robots such as Honda's ASIMO. The robot's onboard computer tries to keep the total inertial forces (the combination of Earth's gravity and the acceleration and deceleration of walking) exactly opposed by the floor reaction force (the force of the floor pushing back on the robot's foot). In this way, the two forces cancel out, leaving no moment (force causing the robot to rotate and fall over). Human observers note that this is not exactly how a human walks, with some describing ASIMO's walk as looking like it needs use the bathroom. ASIMO's walking algorithm utilizes some dynamic balancing, but requires a flat surface.
- Several robots, built in the 1980s by Marc Raibert at the MIT Leg Laboratory, successfully demonstrated very dynamic walking. Initially, a robot with only one leg, and a very small foot could stay upright simply by hopping. The movement is the same as that of a person on a pogo stick. As the robot falls to one side, it would jump slightly in that direction to catch itself. Soon, the algorithm was generalized to two and four legs. A bipedal robot was demonstrated running and even performing somersaults. A quadruped was also demonstrated which could trot, run, pace, and bound.
- A more advanced approach is a dynamic balancing algorithm, which constantly monitors the robot's motion and places the feet to maintain stability. This technique has been demonstrated by Anybots' Dexter robot (which is so stable it can perform jumps) and Delft University's Flame.
- Perhaps the most promising approach uses passive dynamics, in which the momentum of swinging limbs is used to power walking, perhaps increasing efficiency to ten times that of ZMP.

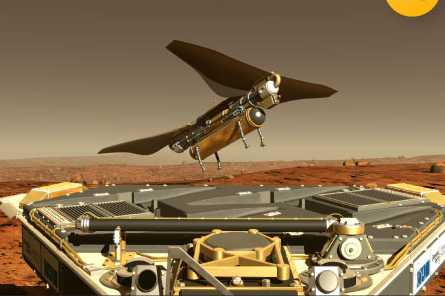
Visualization of entomopter flying on Mars (NASA)

A modern passenger airliner is essentially a flying robot, with two humans to manage it. The autopilot can control the plane through takeoff, normal flight, and landing. Unmanned aerial vehicles (UAVs) can be smaller and lighter and fly into dangerous territory for military use, perhaps even being triggered to fire automatically. Other flying robots include cruise missiles, the entomopter, and the Epson micro helicopter robot. Additionally, some lighter-than-air robots are propelled by paddles and guided by sonar.

Biomimetic flying robots (BFRs) take inspiration from flying mammals, birds, or insects. They can have flapping wings, which generate the lift and thrust, or they can be propeller-actuated. Flapping-wing designs have increased maneuverability and reduced energy consumption compared to propeller actuation. BFRs inspired by mammals and birds share similar flight characteristics and design considerations. For instance, they minimize edge fluttering and pressure-induced wingtip curl by increasing the rigidity of the wing edge.

- Mammal-inspired BFRs typically take inspiration from bats, with the flying squirrel also inspiring a prototype. Mammal-inspired BFRs can be designed to be multimodal; being capable of both flight and terrestrial movement. Shock absorbers can be implemented to reduce the impact of landing. Alternatively, the BFR can pitch up and increase the amount of drag. Different land gait patterns can also be implemented.
- Bird-inspired BFRs can take inspiration from raptors, gulls, and others. They can be feathered to increase the angle of range over which the robot can operate before stalling. The wings of bird-inspired BFRs allow for in-plane deformation, which can be adjusted to maximize flight efficiency depending on the flight gait.
- Insect-inspired BFRs typically take inspiration from beetles or dragonflies.

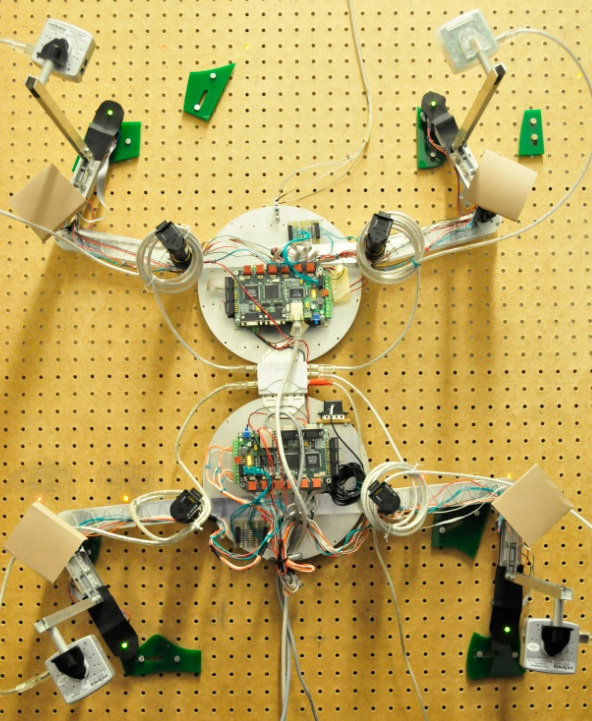
Capuchin, a climbing robot

Several different approaches have been used to develop robots that have the ability to climb vertical surfaces. One approach mimics the movements of a human climber on a wall with protrusions; adjusting the center of mass and moving each limb in turn to gain leverage. Another approach uses the specialized toe-pad method of wall-climbing geckoes, which can run on smooth surfaces such as vertical glass, one example being named Speedy Freelander. A third approach is to mimic the motion of a snake climbing a pole. Separately, snake robots can be used for horizontal navigation, possibly being able to search through confined spaces and navigate amphibiously.

It is calculated that when swimming, some fish can achieve a propulsive efficiency greater than 90%. Furthermore, they can accelerate and maneuver far better than any man-made boat or submarine and cause less disturbance, being a desirable ability for aquatic robots, one of which models fish locomotion. One example copies the streamlined shape and propulsion of the front 'flippers' of penguins. Others emulate the locomotion of the manta ray and jellyfish. In 2013, a robotic fish outperformed some real fish in average maximum velocity and endurance.

Sailboat robots, such as Vaimos, have been developed in order to make measurements at the surface of the ocean. Since saiboat robots are wind-propelled, the batteries only power the computer, communication and actuators (to tune the rudder and sail). Two major sailboat robot competitions occur at the Microtransat Challenge and the World Robotic Sailing Championship.

==== Manipulators ====
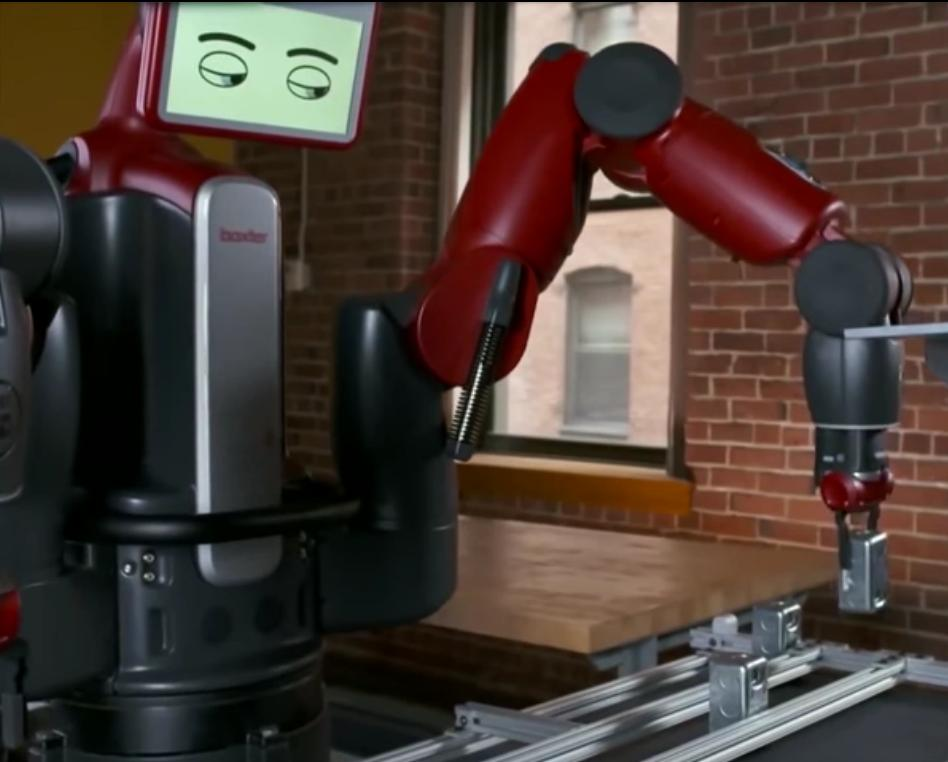
Baxter, a robot with versatile arms

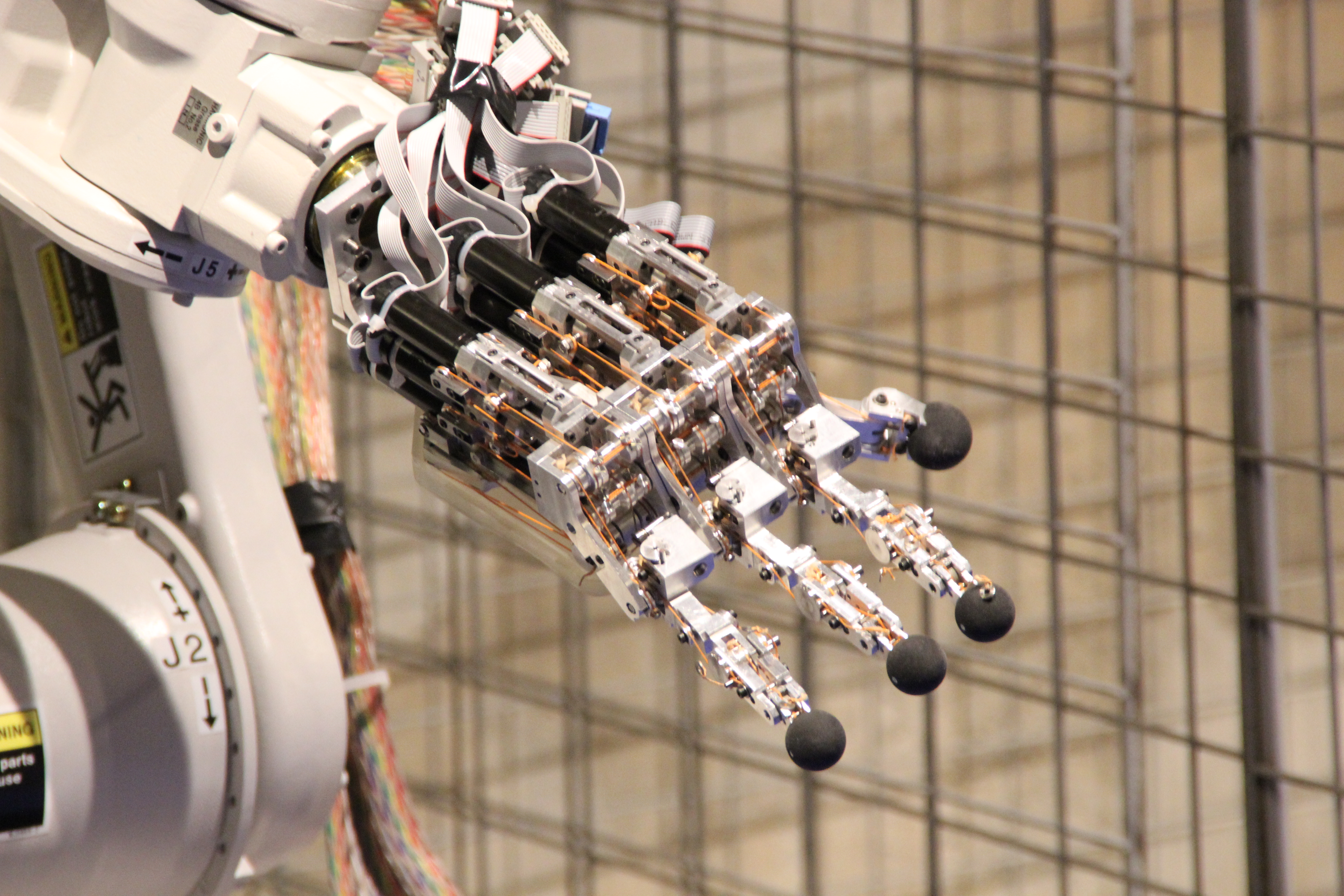
A robotic hand

A definition of robotic manipulation has been described by Matthew T. Mason as the robot's "control of its environment through selective contact". Robots need to manipulate objects; pick up, modify, destroy, move or otherwise have an effect. Thus a robotic arm is referred to as a manipulator and its functional end (e.g. a tool or hand) is known as an end effector. Most robot arms have replaceable end effectors, each allowing them to perform some small range of tasks. Some have a fixed manipulator that cannot be replaced, including highly versatile manipulators like a humanoid hand. Some of these have powerful dexterity intelligence, up to 20 degrees of freedom, and hundreds of tactile sensors.

One of the most common types of end effectors are 'grippers'. In its simplest manifestation, it consists of just two fingers that can open and close to pick up and let go of small objects. Fingers can be made of a chain with a metal wire running through it. Hands that resemble and work more like a human hand include the Shadow Hand and the Robonaut hand. Mechanical grippers can come in various types, including friction and encompassing jaws. Friction jaws use all the force of the gripper to hold the object in place using friction. Encompassing jaws cradle the object in place, using less friction.

Suction end effectors, powered by vacuum generators, are very simple astrictive devices that can hold very large loads provided the prehension surface is smooth enough to ensure suction. Pick-and-place robots for electronic components and for large objects like car windscreens, often use very simple vacuum end effectors. Suction is a highly used type of end effector in industry, in part because the natural compliance of soft suction end effectors can be less likely to damage objects.

=== Control system ===
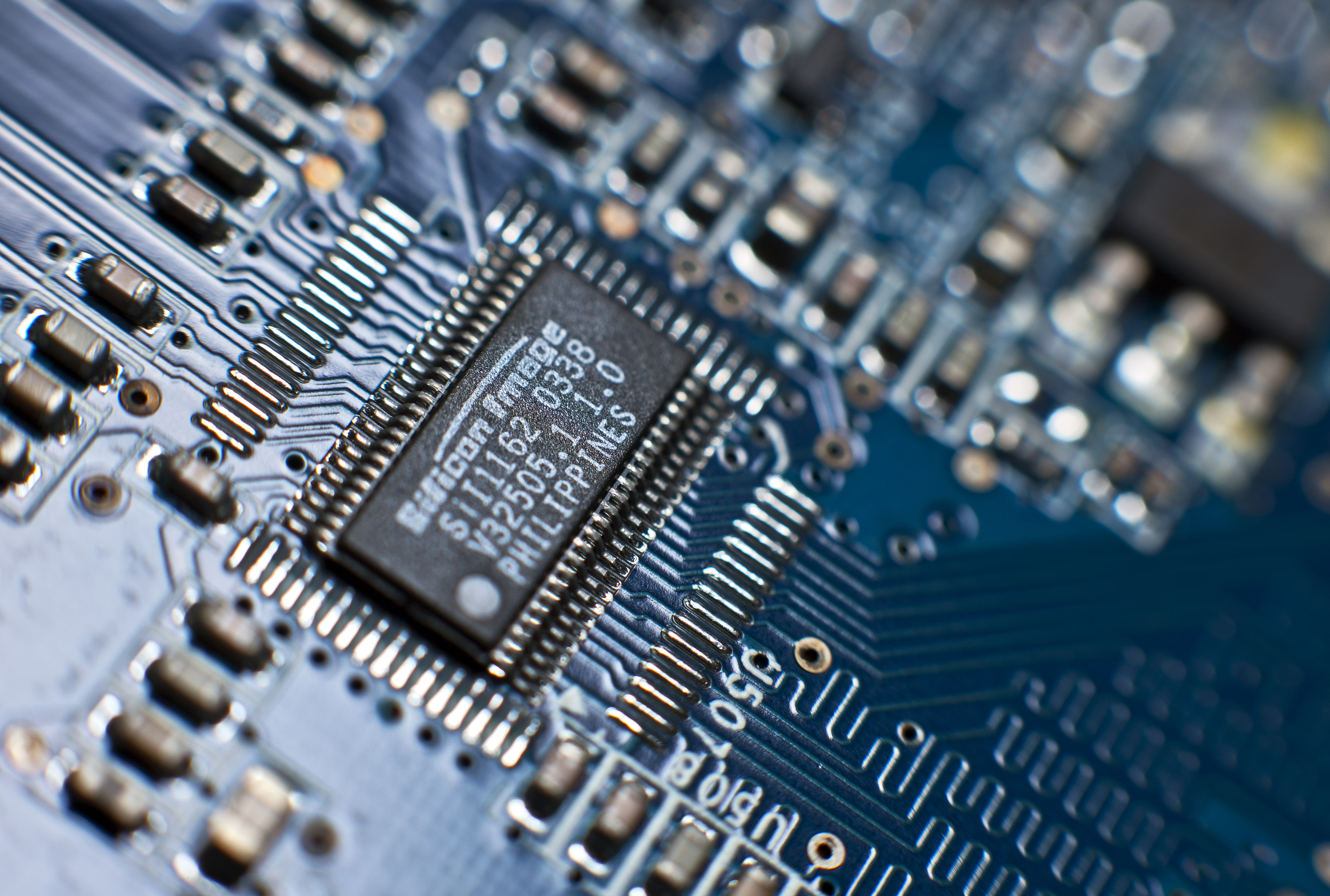
An electrical circuit

The mechanical structure of a robot must be controlled to perform tasks. The control of a robot involves three distinct phases – perception, processing, and action (robotic paradigms). Sensors give information about the environment or the robot itself (e.g. the position of its joints or its end effector). This information is then processed to be stored or transmitted and to calculate the appropriate signals to the actuators (motors), which move the mechanical structure to achieve the required coordinated motion or force actions.

The processing phase can range in complexity. At a reactive level, it may translate raw sensor information directly into actuator commands (e.g. firing motor power electronic gates based directly upon encoder feedback signals to achieve the required torque/velocity of the shaft). Sensor fusion and internal models may first be used to estimate parameters of interest (e.g. the position of the robot's gripper) from noisy sensor data. An immediate task (such as moving the gripper in a certain direction until an object is detected with a proximity sensor) is sometimes inferred from these estimates. Techniques from control theory are generally used to convert the higher-level tasks into individual commands that drive the actuators, most often using kinematic and dynamic models of the mechanical structure.

At longer time scales or with more sophisticated tasks, the robot may need to build and reason with a cognitive model, which try to represent the robot, the world, and how the two interact. Pattern recognition and computer vision can be used to track objects. Mapping, motion planning and other AI techniques may be used to figure out how to act and avoid obstacles.

Robotic control systems integrate multiple sensors and effectors, have many interacting degrees of freedom and require operator interfaces, programming tools and real-time capabilities. They are often connected to wider communication networks, including the Internet of things, a network correlating physical objects. Progress towards open architecture, layered, user-friendly and 'intelligent' sensor-based interconnected robots has emerged from earlier concepts related to flexible manufacturing systems. Further, several 'open' or 'hybrid' reference architectures provide advantages over prior 'closed' control systems.

Open-architecture controllers are said to be better able to meet the growing requirements of a wide range of robot users, including system developers, end users and research scientists, and are better positioned to contribute advanced industrial concepts. In addition to utilizing many established features of robot controllers, such as position, velocity and force control of end effectors, open-architecture controllers also enable interconnection and the implementation of more advanced sensor fusion and control techniques, including adaptive control, fuzzy control, and artificial neural network–based control. When implemented in real time, such techniques can potentially enable more adaptive control systems when working in unfamiliar environments. Generic reference architecture and associated interconnected, open-architecture robot and controller implementation has been used in a number of studies.

==== Sensing ====
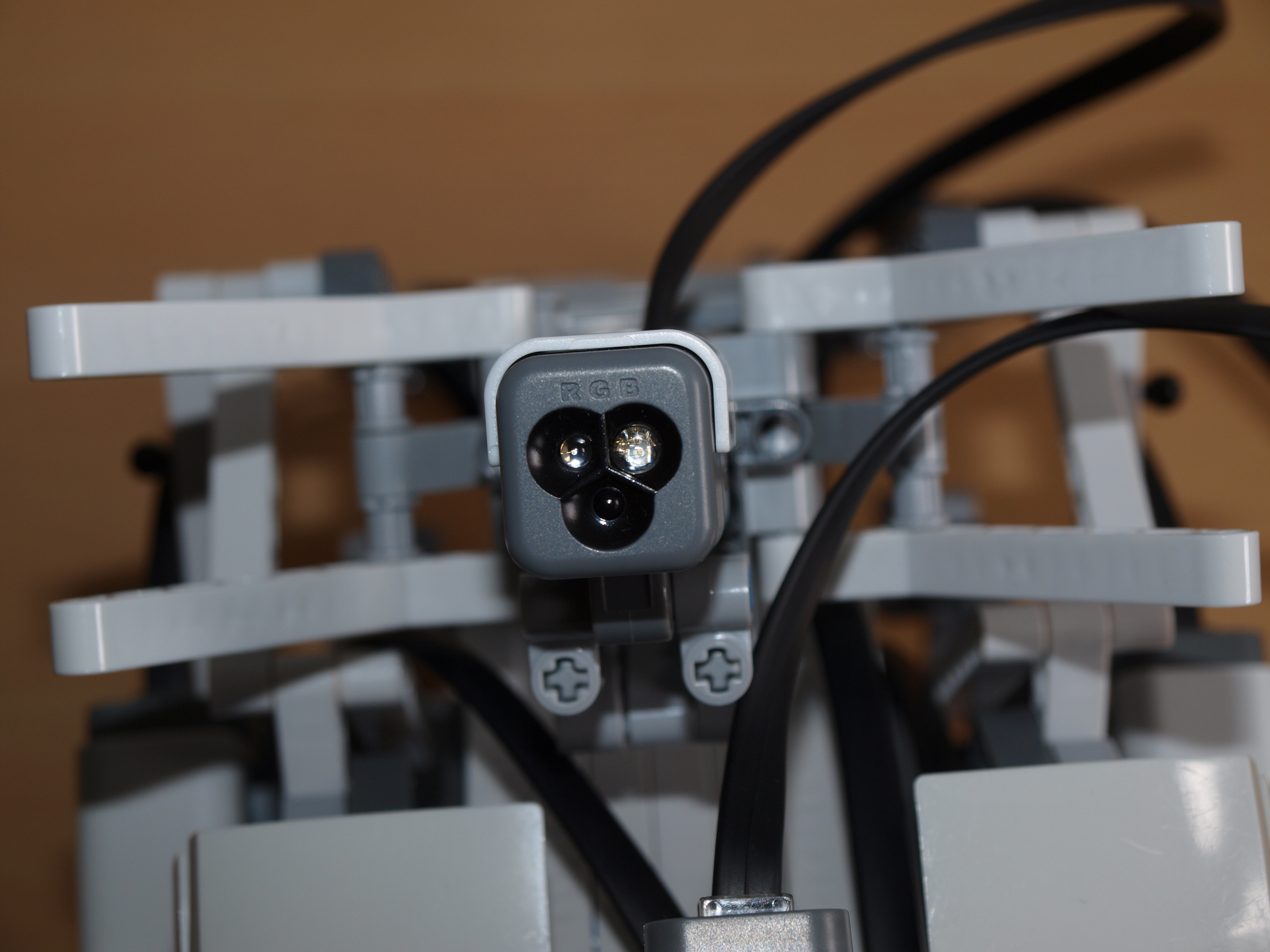
A color sensor on a robot

Sensors allow robots to receive information about the environment or internal components. This is essential for robots to perform their tasks and respond to changes with the appropriate response. Sensors are used for various forms of measurements, to provide real-time information, and to give the robots warnings; they can include cameras and microphones, as well as those that monitor network signals, power level, pressure, and temperature.

Current robotic and prosthetic hands receive far less tactile information than the human hand. Recent research has developed a tactile sensor array that mimics the mechanical properties and touch receptors of human fingertips. The sensor array is constructed as a rigid core surrounded by conductive fluid contained by an elastomeric skin. Electrodes are mounted on the surface of the rigid core and connected to an impedance-measuring device within the core. When the artificial skin touches an object, the fluid path around the electrodes is deformed, producing impedance changes that map the forces received from the object. An important function of artificial fingertips will likely be adjusting the grip on held objects. Scientists from several European countries and Israel developed a prosthetic hand in 2009 which functions like a real one—allowing patients to write, type on a keyboard, and perform other fine movements. The prosthesis has sensors which enable the patient to sense through its fingertips.

Other common forms of sensing in robotics use lidar, radar, and sonar. Lidar measures the distance to a target by illuminating the target with laser light and measuring the reflected light with a sensor. Radar uses radio waves to determine the range, angle, or velocity of objects. Sonar uses sound propagation to navigate, communicate with or detect objects on or under the surface of the water. More abstractly, robot forms inspired by origami are designed to sense and analyze in extreme environments.

Cameras can capture visible light and other forms of electromagnetic radiation such as infrared. Multiple sensors and particular lenses may be used to achieve a certain field of view and depth perception. Computer vision has increasingly utilized machine learning. Barcode scanning may be utilized, but is not necessarily universally effective.

=== Software ===
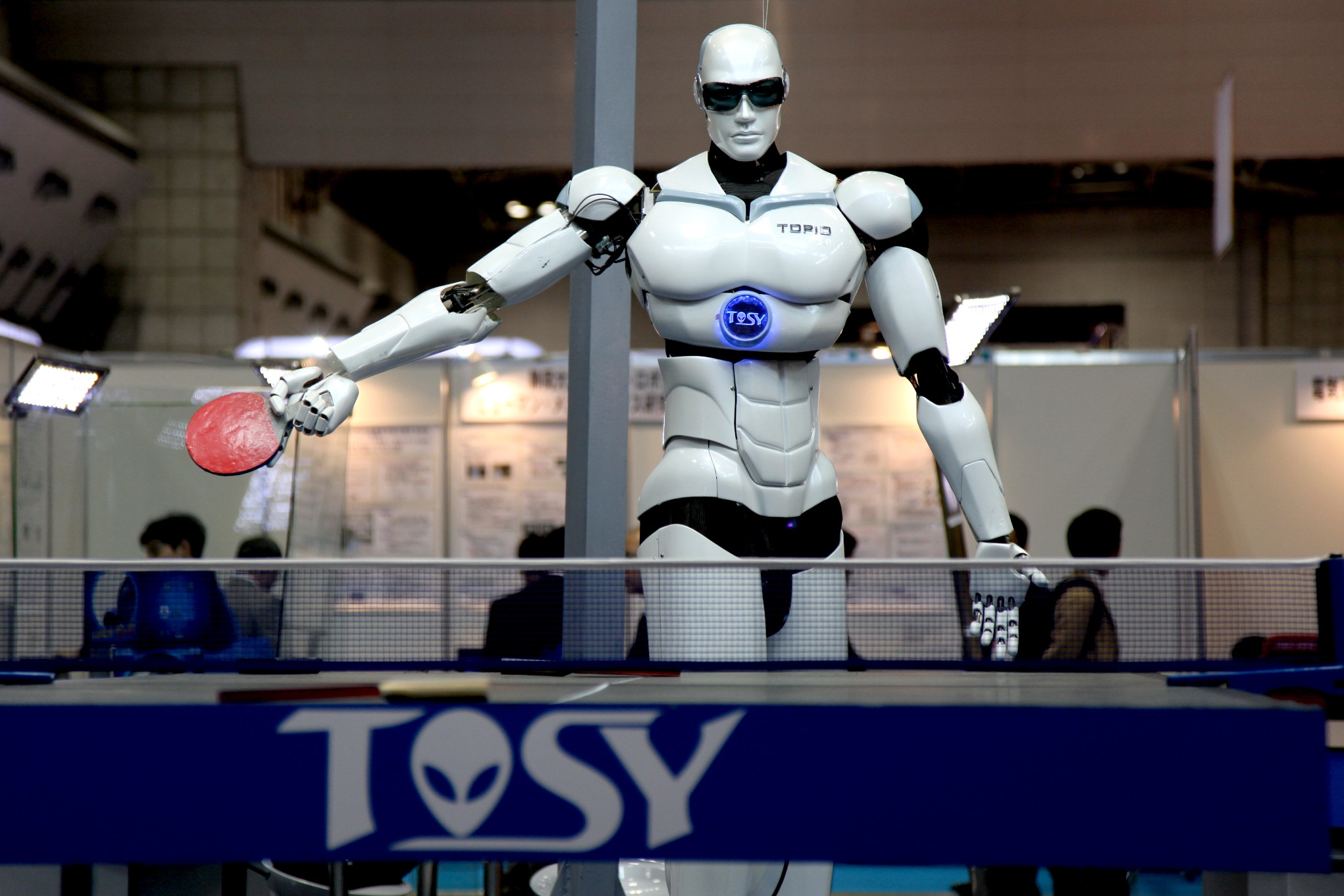
TOPIO, a ping pong–playing robot

A program is how a robot decides when or how to do something. Specific motions can be designed via computer animation software such as Autodesk Maya. Programs can be run by remote control, AI, or a hybrid of the two.

A robot with remote-control programming has a preexisting set of commands that it will perform when it receives a signal from a control source—essentially a form of automation that humans have extensive control over. In the mid-1980s, most mobile robots were controlled using a joystick. High-precision fields such as surgery can now operate devices via teleoperation, potentially aided by haptic feedback.

Meanwhile, AI-supported autonomous robots operate without a control source and use their programming to determine responses to various stimuli. Highly predictable machines, such as industrial robots, typically do not require complex cognition.

Hybrid robots may be assisted by an operator who selects certain modes or commands general actions, with AI determining the necessary motions.

==== Human–robot interaction ====
For effective use in domestic environments, science-fiction authors and futurists often envision humans communicating with robots via speech, gestures, and facial expressions rather than a command-line interface. Sounds, facial expressions, and body language can be used to convey emotions. Meanwhile, recognizing human speech in real time is a difficult task for a computer, mostly because of speech's great variability. AI-assisted machines can use voice to identify emotions. Social robots will also likely need to be able to recognize gestures (and perhaps perform them) to assist verbal communication.

==== Developments in autonomy ====
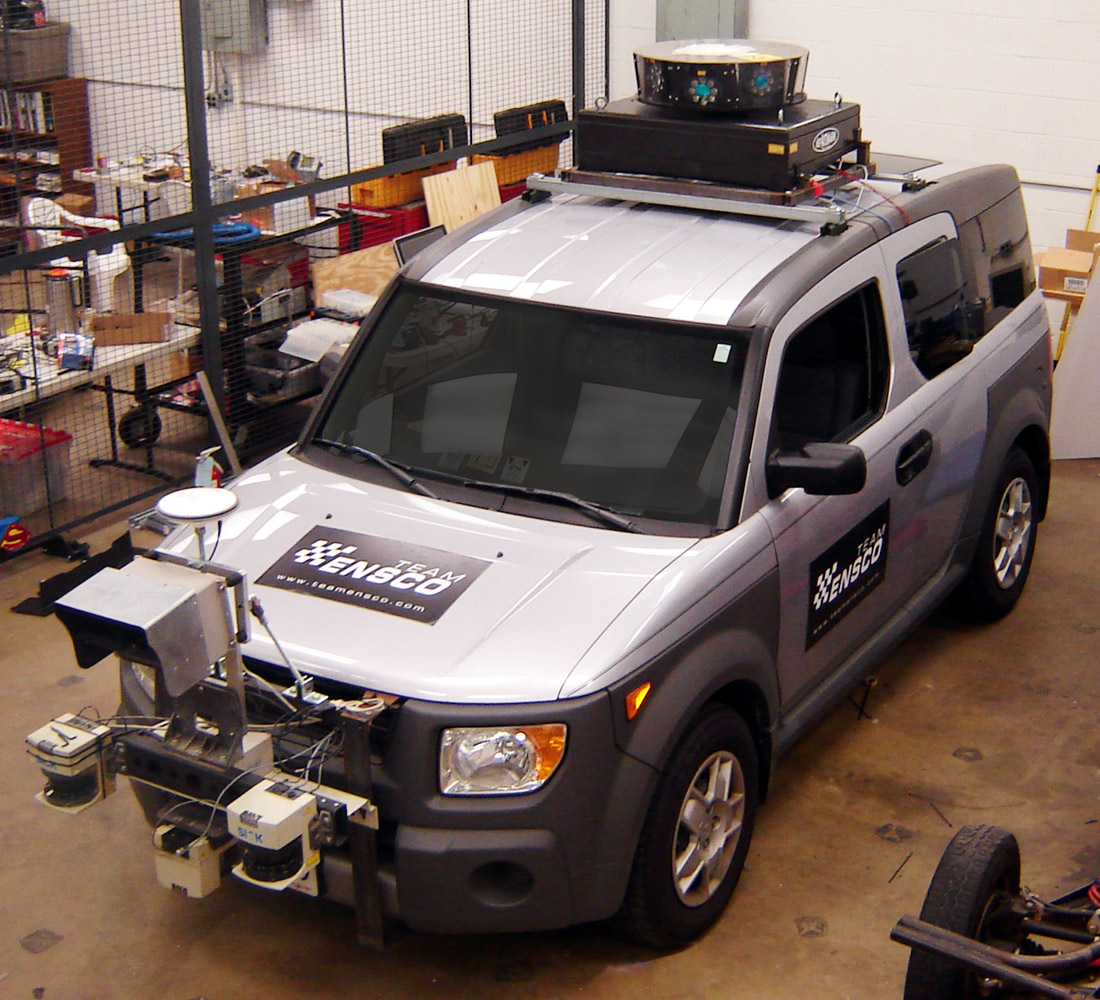
GPS, radar, and lidar are combined in a vehicle developed for 2007's DARPA Urban Challenge.

Robots that can operate autonomously in a dynamic environment require a combination of mapping and navigation hardware and software to traverse their environment and avoid colliding with other objects. Besides humanoids such as ASIMO and Meinü robots, this particularly applies to self-driving cars, which variously employ the Global Positioning System (GPS), radar, lidar, cameras, an inertial navigation system and/or swarms of autonomous robots.

By 2025, Figure AI developed a vision–language–action model that can control two humanoid robots at once. By the next year, MIT developed a predictive technique allowing humanoid robots to think ahead instead of having to recalibrate in real-time as the environment changes; this increased their speed by two or three times while slightly decreasing their accuracy.

== Applications ==
Current and potential applications of robots include:

- Agriculture, closely linked to the concept of AI-assisted precision agriculture and drone usage
- AI art creation
- Construction, utilizing humanoid robots, robotic arms, or robotic exoskeletons
- Domestic work such as lawn mowing, vacuum cleaning, and (via humanoid robots) baking and dishwasher operation
- Education about programming, often as early as middle school
- Electric resistance welding
- Energy applications including cleanup of nuclear contaminated areas (Note: One database, developed by the United States Department of Energy, contains information on almost 500 existing robotic technologies.) and cleaning solar panel arrays
- Food and beverage processing, as well as commercial dishwashing
- Industrial robots for manufacturing and assembly
- Logistics and inventory management including palletizing, operating pallet jacks and forklifts, opening and breaking down boxes, and stocking shelves
- Medical robots and robot-assisted surgery designed and used in clinics
- Military robots
- Mining
- Robot sports, including combat and racing (including drone racing)
- Space exploration, including Mars rovers
- Transportation, including airplane autopilot and self-driving cars

== Employment concerns ==
A robot technician builds small all-terrain robots (courtesy: MobileRobots, Inc.).

The incorporation of robots into industries has increased efficiency and productivity. It is typically seen as a long-term investment for benefactors and perhaps even an essential component of manufacturing. According to a 2017 study, most human jobs can be automated, eventually putting 47% of US jobs at risk, besides those taken by humanoid robots. Robots are thus often used as an argument for basic income to replace lost wages. In 2016, scientist Stephen Hawking observed:

The automation of factories has already decimated jobs in traditional manufacturing, and the rise of artificial intelligence is likely to extend this job destruction deep into the middle classes, with only the most caring, creative or supervisory roles remaining.

According to the Robotic Industries Association US data, in 2016 the automotive industry was the main customer of industrial robots with 52% of total sales. They can perform over half of the labor in the auto industry, including heavy duty such as car assembly. By 2003, an IBM keyboard manufacturing factory in Texas was fully automated as a "lights out" factory. In 2026, one expert observed that most humanoid logistics robots would likely be assigned to new, streamlined facilities, rather than those originally designed for humans. As of 2022, China had the greatest number of industrial robots in operation with 1.5 million units and was increasing that figure by more than 20% annually.

Since 2018, autonomous restaurants have been run in Massachusetts (by Spyce Kitchen until 2022), the Los Angeles area (by Miso Robotics), and the Chicago area (by Nala Robotics). As of August 2026, California Pizza Kitchen planned to install 1,000 vending machines over three years. Some companies sell their kitchen automation systems, including those related to commercial dishwashing.

In the first half of 2026, China delivered over 40,000 humanoid robots. The Donald Trump administration subsequently banned the import of new advanced robot models from China, citing security concerns, while US companies prepared to deliver some of the first robots intended for domestic use. The incorporation of robots also creates some supervision jobs.

=== Safety and health ===
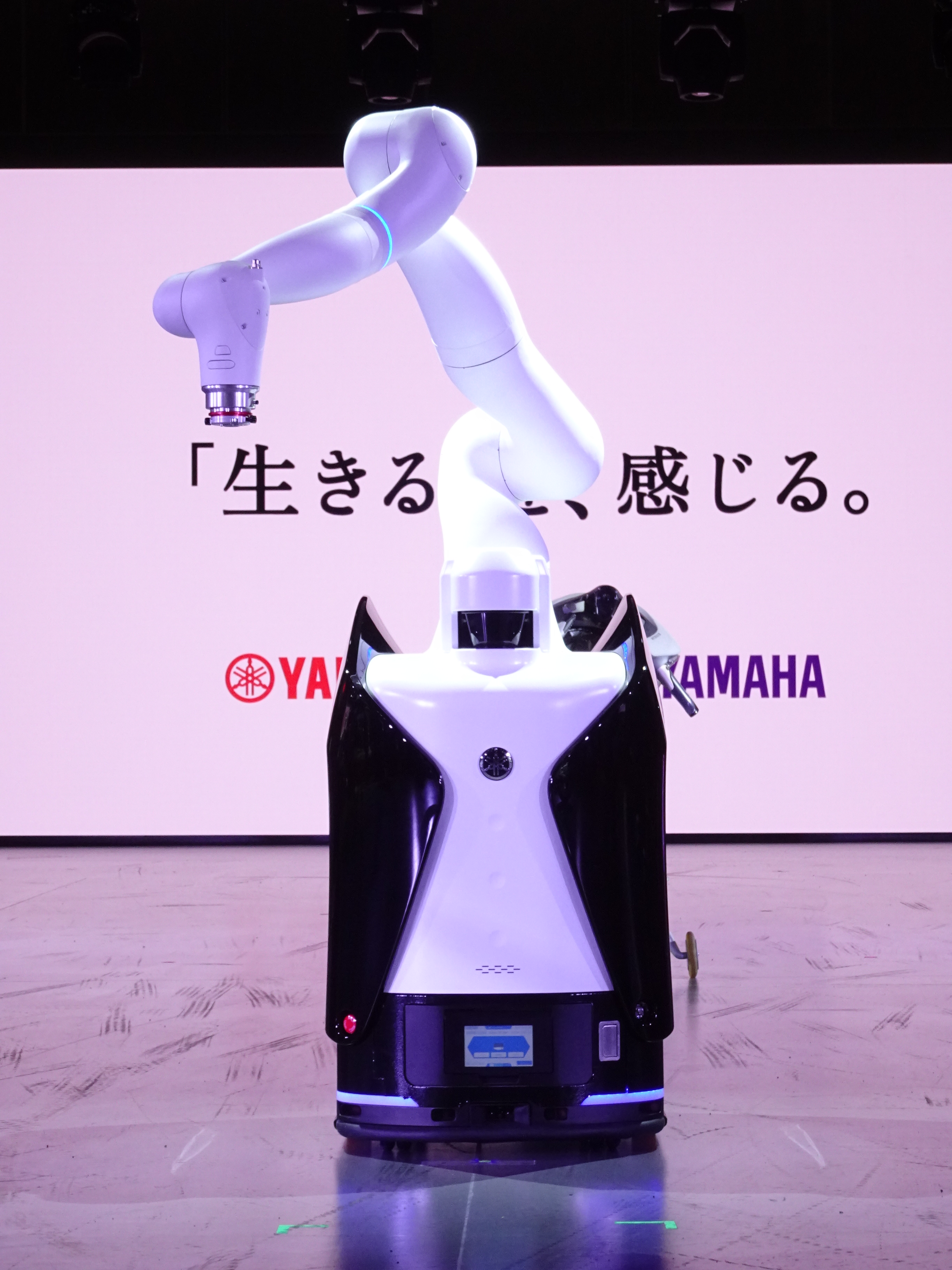
Yamaha Motor's industrial cobot (collaborative robot)

The spread of robotics presents both opportunities and challenges for occupational safety and health (OSH). Despite lost wages, the substitution of people working in unhealthy or dangerous environments is an OSH benefit. These include not only high-risk jobs in space, security, and energy, but also dirty or unsafe work in logistics, maintenance, and inspection that require exposure to physical and/or psychosocial risks, including those stemming from repetitive or monotonous tasks better suited to machines. Robots are likely to gradually replace such jobs in other sectors like agriculture, cleaning, construction, firefighting, healthcare, and transportation. In late 2026, InvestorPlace suggested that humanoid robots may be first deployed to work night shifts; as of 2007 some 20% of the workforce of developed countries worked nights, but it likely contributes to the risk of cancer.

On the other hand, humans are better suited than machines for light-duty jobs involving various levels of creativity, decision-making, and flexibility. Humans and robots increasingly work in parallel within their areas of expertise. The need to work safely in a close space has resulted in cobots (collaborative robots). Some European countries are including robotics in their national programs, promoting healthy cooperation between robots and operators to increase productivity.

=== Careers ===
Robotics is an interdisciplinary field, primarily combining mechanical engineering and computer science but also drawing on electronic engineering and other subjects. Undergraduate degrees are usually obtained in one of these subjects prior to the pursuance of a graduate degree in robotics. Robotics engineers design and maintain robots, develop new applications, and conduct research. As of 2011, the number of robotics-related jobs was steadily rising as factories increasingly utilized robots. According to a September 2021 GlobalData report, the robotics industry was worth US$45 billion in 2020, and by 2030 it will have grown at a compound annual growth rate of 29% to US$568 bn, driving jobs in robotics and related industries.

== Research ==
Much of the research in robotics focuses not on specific industrial tasks, but on investigations into new types of robots, alternative ways to think about or design robots, and new ways to manufacture them. In 1997, Professor Hans Moravec, principal research scientist at the Carnegie's Robotics Institute, predicted that robot intelligence would reach the capacity of a lizard by 2010, a mouse by 2020, then a monkey and finally a human by around 2045.

External videos
- How the BB-8 Sphero Toy Works

The study of motion can be divided into kinematics and dynamics. Kinematics studies motion independent of natural forces, incorporating predictable solutions such as collision avoidance. Direct or forward kinematics refers to the manual control of joints to manipulate end effectors, while in inverse kinematics, end-effector states are predetermined and the joint values automated. Meanwhile, dynamics apply the effect of natural forces to kinematic motions, including phenomena such as torque. Direct dynamics refers to the calculation of accelerations once the applied forces are known, used in computer simulations. Inverse dynamics refers to the calculation of the actuator forces that result in certain end-effector accelerations.

Open-source robotics is based upon publicly available datasets or software that can be used in the process of designing and building robots, eliminating the need to independently conduct potentially expensive and redundant research.

Evolutionary robotics is a methodology that uses evolutionary computation to help design robots, especially the body form, or motion and behavior controllers. In a similar way to natural evolution, a large population of robots is allowed to compete in some way, or their ability to perform a task is measured using a fitness function. Those that perform worst are removed from the population and replaced by a new set with behaviors based on those of the winners. Over time the population improves and eventually a satisfactory robot may appear without direct human intervention. Researchers use this method both to create better robots and to explore the nature of evolution. Because the process often requires the study of many generations of robots, this technique may be run entirely or mostly in simulation before testing the evolved algorithms on real robots.

Bionics and biomimetics apply the physiology and methods of locomotion of animals to the design of robots. For example, the design of BionicKangaroo was based on the way kangaroos jump.

Swarm robotics is an approach to the coordination of multiple robots as a system which consist of large numbers of mostly simple physical robots.

Quantum robotics is the study of running robotic programs on quantum computers, which will likely outperform digital computers.

Additional general areas of study include cobots, drones, and nanorobots. Two major academic conferences for robotics research are the International Conference on Robotics and Automation and International Conference on Intelligent Robots and Systems.

== See also ==
- Cloud robotics
- Cognitive robotics
- Ethics of artificial intelligence
- Fog robotics
- Glossary of robotics
- List of roboticists
- Index of robotics articles
- List of robotics companies
- List of robotics journals
- List of robotics software
- Mechatronics
- Multi-agent system
- Outline of robotics
- Roboethics
- Robotic art
- Robotic governance
- Self-reconfiguring modular robot
- Telerobotics
