= Tennessee House of Representatives 10th district =

State legislative district in Tennessee

Tennessee's 10th State House of Representatives district
- Map of Tennessee House districts with the 10th District shaded in red
Representative
Rick Eldridge; R–Morristown
since 2019
- Demographics: 80.2% White; 2.5% Black; 12.8% Hispanic; 0.9% Asian; 2.6% Multiracial
- Population (2024): 73,644

The Tennessee House of Representatives 10th district is one of the 99 legislative districts in the lower house of the Tennessee General Assembly. The district is located in East Tennessee and covers Grainer and part of Hamblen counties. The district includes Blaine, Rutledge, Bean Station, and Morristown. Cherokee Lake stretches across the east of the district. The rest of the district is unincorporated and mostly rural. Rick Eldridge has represented the district since 2019.

== Demographics ==
The Tennessee Comptroller estimates the population as of 2024 at 73,644.

- 80.2% of the district is White
- 12.8% of the district is Hispanic
- 2.5% of the district is Black
- 0.9% of the district is Asian
- 2.6% of the district is Two or more races

Detailed demographic information is also available through Census Reporter.

== History ==
The 88th Tennessee General Assembly was the first in which all districts were numbered. At this time, the 10th district was in Hamblen and Jefferson counties. From the 91st-112th GAs, it was in Hamblen County. Since the 113th General Assembly, it has been composed of Grainer and part of Hamblen counties.

== List of Representatives ==
Representative	Party	Years of Service	General Assembly	Hometown
Rick Eldridge	Republican	2019-present	111th-114th	Morristown
Tilman Goins	Republican	2013-2018	108th-110th	Morristown
Don Miller	Republican	2011-2012	107th	Morristown
John Litz	Democratic	2003-2010	103rd-106th	Morristown
Stancil Ford	Republican	1995-2002	99th-102nd	Talbott
Gary Johnson	Democratic	1991-1994	97th-98th	Morristown
Edward Moody	Republican	1985-1990	94th-96th	Morristown
J. B. Shockley	Republican	1977-1984	90th-93rd	Morristown
David D. Miller	Democratic	1975-1976	89th	Morristown
Howard S. Spoone	Republican	1973-1974	88th	Morristown
