= Don Miller =

Don or Donald Miller may refer to:

== Politics ==
- Don Miller (Tennessee politician) (born 1956), member of the Tennessee House of Representatives
- Donald R. Miller (born 1966), member of the New York State Assembly

== Sports ==
- Don Miller (American football, born 1902) (1902–1979), member of the Four Horsemen of Notre Dame, the backfield of Notre Dame's 1924 football team
- Don Miller (American football, born 1932), professional football player for the Green Bay Packers and Philadelphia Eagles
- Don Miller (American football coach) (born c. 1933), head football coach at Trinity College in Hartford, Connecticut from 1967 to 1998
- Donald Miller (cricketer) (born 1939), Jamaican cricketer
- Donald Miller Jr. (born 1963), American horse racing jockey

== Music ==
- Don Miller (singer) (1940–2021), American pop singer, founding member of the vocal group The Vogues
- Donald Miller (guitarist), member of the band Borbetomagus

== Other ==
- Don Miller, producer of movies such as White Men Can't Jump
- Don Miller, former president of Penske Racing
- Don C. Miller, (1923–2015), American engineer and amateur archeologist
- Donald Miller (author) (born 1971), Christian author and public speaker
- Donald H. Miller, Jr., one of the founders of Scientific American magazine
- Donald L. Miller (born 1944), American historian
- Donald E. Miller (born 1946), American theologian
- Donald Gene Miller (born 1954), American serial killer
- Donald Miller (serial killer) (1941–2005), American serial killer

== See also ==
- J. Donald Millar (1934–2015), known as Don Millar, physician
