= World Robotic Sailing Championship =

WRSC (World Robotic Sailing Championship) is an autonomous sailboat competition that aims at stimulating the development of autonomous marine robotics. It is a spinoff competition from the Microtransat challenge, a trans Atlantic race for autonomous sailing robots.

The WRSC is intended to promote the development of autonomous wind propelled sailing robots, through a series of short-distance races, navigation and autonomy challenges. Many teams who take part in the Microtransat (or who plan to) also attend the WRSC.

The accompanying IRSC (International Robotic Sailing Conference) provides researchers working on problems related to autonomous sailing the chance to exchange ideas during a scientific conference.

== History ==
The first World Robotic Sailing Championships (WRSC) was organised by INNOC (The Austrian Association for Innovative Computer Science) and took place in Austria in 2008; it has taken place annually in different country every year since.

=== First edition (2008) ===
From 20 to 25 May 2008 in Breitenbrunn/Neusiedlersee, Österreich.

=== Second edition (2009) ===
The 2009 WRSC/IRSC event was held in the city of Matosinhos, north of Portugal, from July 6 to July 12, 2009, and organized by the Faculdade de Engenharia da Universidade do Porto (School of Engineering of the University of Porto), in cooperation with the Clube Naval de Leça (a local sailing club).

=== Third edition (2010) ===
The 2010 WRSC/IRSC event was held in Kingston, Ontario, Canada from 7 to 10 June 2010 .

=== Fourth edition (2011) ===
This edition of the WRSC/IRSC , the World Robotic Sailing Championship, from 16 to 20 August 2011 was held in Lübeck, Germany.

=== Fifth edition (2012) ===
This edition of the WRSC/IRSC was held at the Cardiff Bay Yacht Club in Cardiff, Wales, UK from 17 to 21 September 2012. The competition was organised by Aberystwyth University with assistance from Cardiff University.

=== Sixth edition (2013) ===
This edition of the WRSC/IRSC event was held from 2 to 6 September in the city of Brest, in north west of France, and organised by the National Institute of Advanced Technologies of Brittany, in cooperation with the French Naval Academy and Ifremer. The robot Vaimos was one of the sailboats of the competition.

=== Seventh edition (2014) ===
The seventh edition of the WRSC/IRSC event was held from 8 to 12 September in the city of Galway in the west of Ireland, and organized by the National University of Ireland, Galway in cooperation with Hewlett Packard.

=== Eighth edition (2015) ===
The eighth edition of the WRSC/IRSC event was held from 31 August until 4 September in the city of Mariehamn in Åland, and organized by the Åland University of Applied Sciences.

=== Ninth edition (2016) ===
The ninth edition of the WRSC/IRSC event was held from 5 to 10 September in Viana do Castelo in the north of Portugal, and organized by the Faculty of Engineering of the University of Porto.

=== Tenth edition (2017) ===
The tenth edition of the WRSC/IRSC event took place in Horten, Norway, September 4–8. "https://www.wrsc2017.com/"

=== Eleventh edition (2018) ===
The eleventh edition of the WRSC/IRSC event took place in Southampton, UK, August 28 - September 1.

=== Twelfth edition (2019) ===
The twelfth edition of the WRSC/IRSC event took place in Ningbo, China, August 25–30. "https://www.roboticsailing.org/2019/"
