= Quantum robotics =

Field of robotics, physics

Quantum robotics is an interdisciplinary field that investigates the intersection of robotics and quantum mechanics. This field, in particular, explores the applications of quantum phenomena such as quantum entanglement within the realm of robotics. Examples of its applications include quantum communication in multi-agent cooperative robotic scenarios, the use of quantum algorithms in performing robotic tasks, and the integration of quantum devices (e.g., quantum detectors) in robotic systems.

== Introduction ==
The free-space quantum communication between mobile platforms was proposed for reconfigurable quantum key distribution (QKD) applications using unmanned aerial vehicle (UAVs, a.k.a. drones) in 2017. This technology was later advanced in various aspects in mobile drone and vehicle platforms in several configurations such as drone-to-drone, drone-to-moving vehicle, and vehicle-to-vehicle systems.

Some research has contributed to low-size, low-weight, and low-power quantum key distribution systems for small-form UAVs, the characterization of a polarization-based receiver for mobile free-space optical QKD, and optical-relayed entanglement distribution using drones as mobile nodes. The topic of free-space quantum communication between mobile platforms, initially developed to meet the need for free-space QKD and entanglement distribution using mobile nodes, was brought into the robotics domain as an emerging interdisciplinary mechatronics topic to investigate the interface between quantum technologies and the robotic systems domain. The main advantage of such integrated technology is the guaranteed security in communication between multi-agent and cooperative autonomous systems. Other advances are anticipated.

== Quantum entanglement ==
According to quantum mechanics, entanglement occurs when more than one particle become connected. If the state of one particle changes then it will instantly change the state of other particles regardless of their distance. Entangled sensors do the same kind of work and achieve strong sensitivity. A group of quantum robots can measure magnetic fields, gravitational fields and other physical properties using entangled sensors with high rate of accuracy. Again the connection of one robot to other is increased (become strong) by quantum entanglement.

== Quantum teleportation ==
Quantum teleportation is the transfer of quantum information (not physical objects). This is used in case of multi robot process. One robot is programmed with a complex quantum update. Then that robot can teleport that complex quantum information (the update) to other robots. This teleportation or communication is very secure because all the work is done in quantum state.

== Kinematics ==
Quantum computing has been proposed as being optimal for calculating inverse kinematics values.

== Alice and Bob robots ==
In the realm of quantum mechanics, the names Alice and Bob are frequently employed to illustrate various phenomena, protocols, and applications. These include their roles in QKD, quantum cryptography, entanglement, and teleportation. The terms "Alice Robot" and "Bob Robot" serve as analogous expressions that merge the concepts of Alice and Bob from quantum mechanics with mechatronic mobile platforms (such as robots, drones, and autonomous vehicles). For example, the Alice Robot functions as a transmitter platform that communicates with the Bob Robot, housing the receiving detectors.

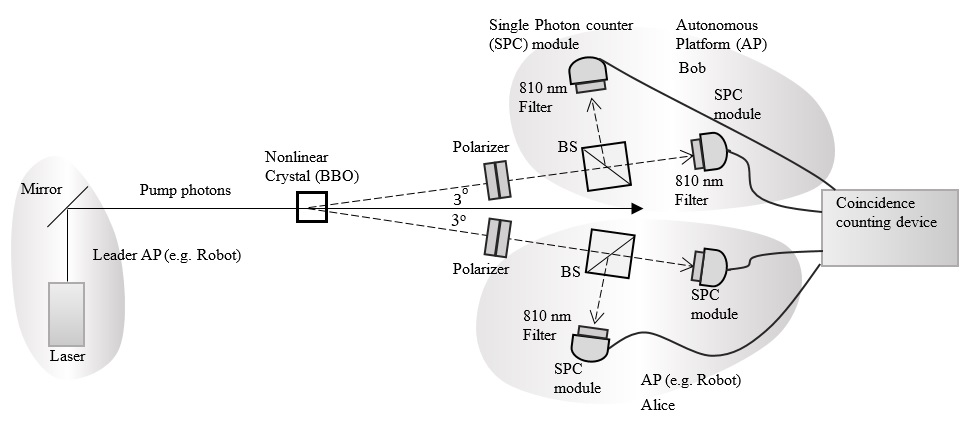
Experimental quantum entanglement via spontaneous parametric down-conversion (SPDC)

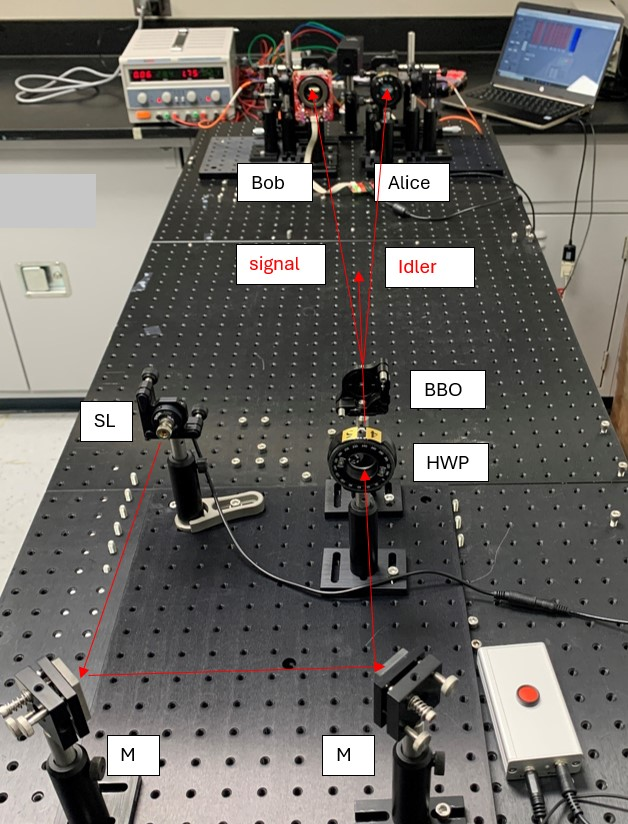
Experimental entanglement (including laser source) via SPDC

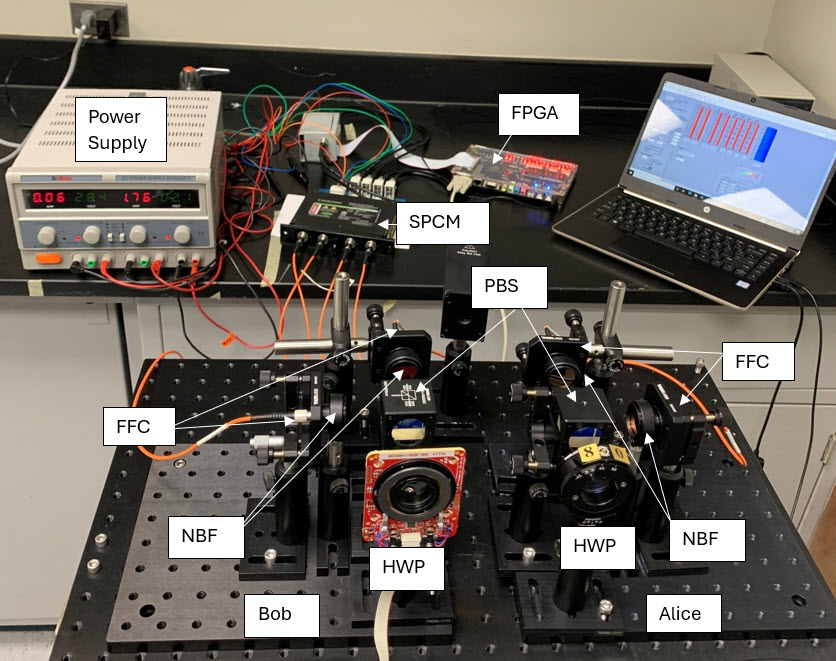
Alice and Bob setup in a polarization quantum entanglement experiment

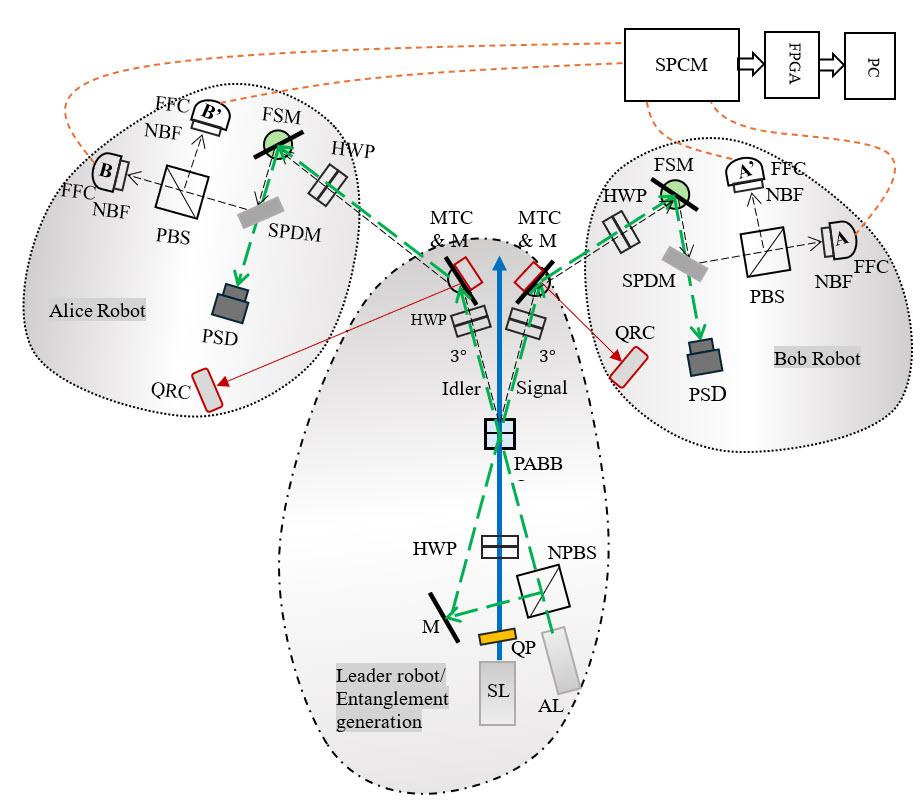
Schematic of robots sharing entangled photons between moving robotic platforms in a quantum communication setup
