= Mantis the spider robot =

Mantis Walking Machine
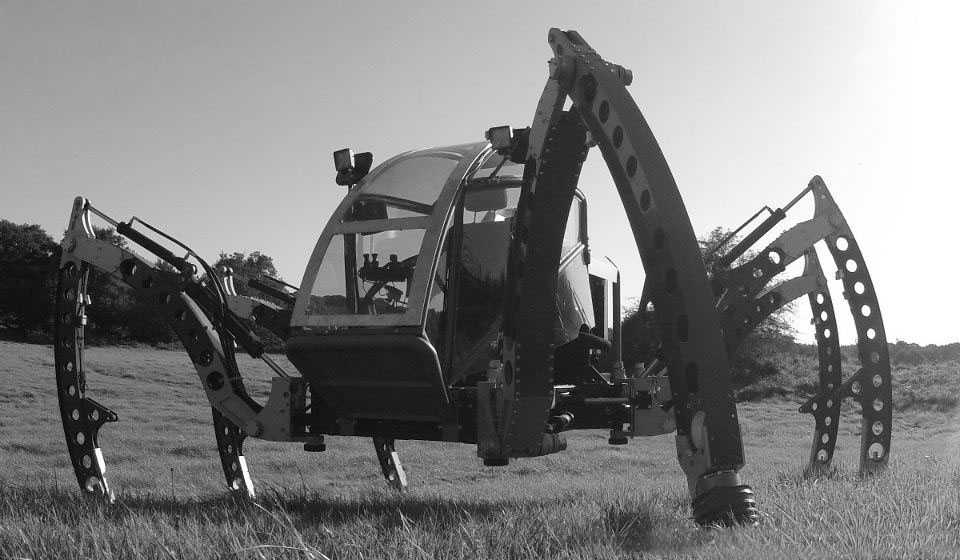
- Mantis Walking Machine 2012

Mantis the spider robot is a large, robotic spider created by Matt Denton and his company Micromagic Systems. It took four years to create and design it. The robot is capable to transport one person and can circulate on any surface. The robot weighs 4,188 pounds (1,900 kg), is 9.18 feet (2.80 m) high and is powered by a Perkins Engines Turbo Diesel motor of 2.2L of 50Hp that is in charge of the hydraulic system. Several sensors around it help it to walk. The robot is controlled by a computer running the Linux operating system and HexEngine software, which controls the hydraulic solenoid in the legs. It is driver-operated by joysticks within a cockpit, can travel at approximately 1 mile per hour (1.6 km/h) and can cover 5 kilometres (3.1 miles) on a 4.5 imperial gallons (20 L) tank of diesel, but its creators are investing to triple the speed.

== See also ==
- Arachno-Bot
