= Don C. Miller =

American engineer and artifact collector

Don C. Miller (May 25, 1923 - March 22, 2015) was an American engineer and artifact collector from Rush County, Indiana. Miller led a long career in electrical engineering, but he is most well known for his sizable and controversial private collection of artifacts. In 2014, an investigation of his collection by the Federal Bureau of Investigation resulted in the "largest single recovery of cultural property in FBI history".

== Early life and career ==
Don Miller was born on his family's farm in Orange Township, Rush County, where he lived for most of his life. He was raised an Evangelical Christian and continued in that faith throughout his life.

During the 1940s, Don Miller worked in New Mexico at the Los Alamos National Laboratory on the Manhattan Project. He reportedly claimed that he fired the world's first atomic bomb. This claim has been disputed. Vanity Fair reported that Miller assisted William Higinbotham, the head of the Manhattan Project's electronics group, in constructing equipment for the Trinity Test. He also observed and gathered data on the Trinity Test. However, there is no record that Miller fired the first atomic bomb and Joe McKibben is broadly recognized as the person that did.

Miller spent most of his career working in the research department of Naval Avionics of Indianapolis. He retired from that position in 1990. Miller founded and owned an electrical component manufacturing company named Wyman Research, Inc. from 1998 to 2000.

== Private collection and FBI seizure ==
Throughout his adult life, Miller was known to be an avid collector of artifacts and often collected items while traveling, sometimes while on Christian mission trips abroad. Some of the items in his collection were displayed in a private gallery located in the basement of his home while others were kept in storage on his property. Miller was known to give tours of his collection to local residents, reporters, and boy scout groups.

In 2013, the FBI received an anonymous tip about Miller's "amateur archeologist" collection of artifacts; the tipster claimed that the collection included human skulls, bones, and articulated skeletons. Special Agent Tim Carpenter of the FBI Art Crime Team followed up on the tip and Miller gave the officer a voluntary tour of the property. During the tour, Carpenter observed artifacts that he considered to be "almost certainly illegal" to possess and Miller claimed that he had personally recovered each artifact.

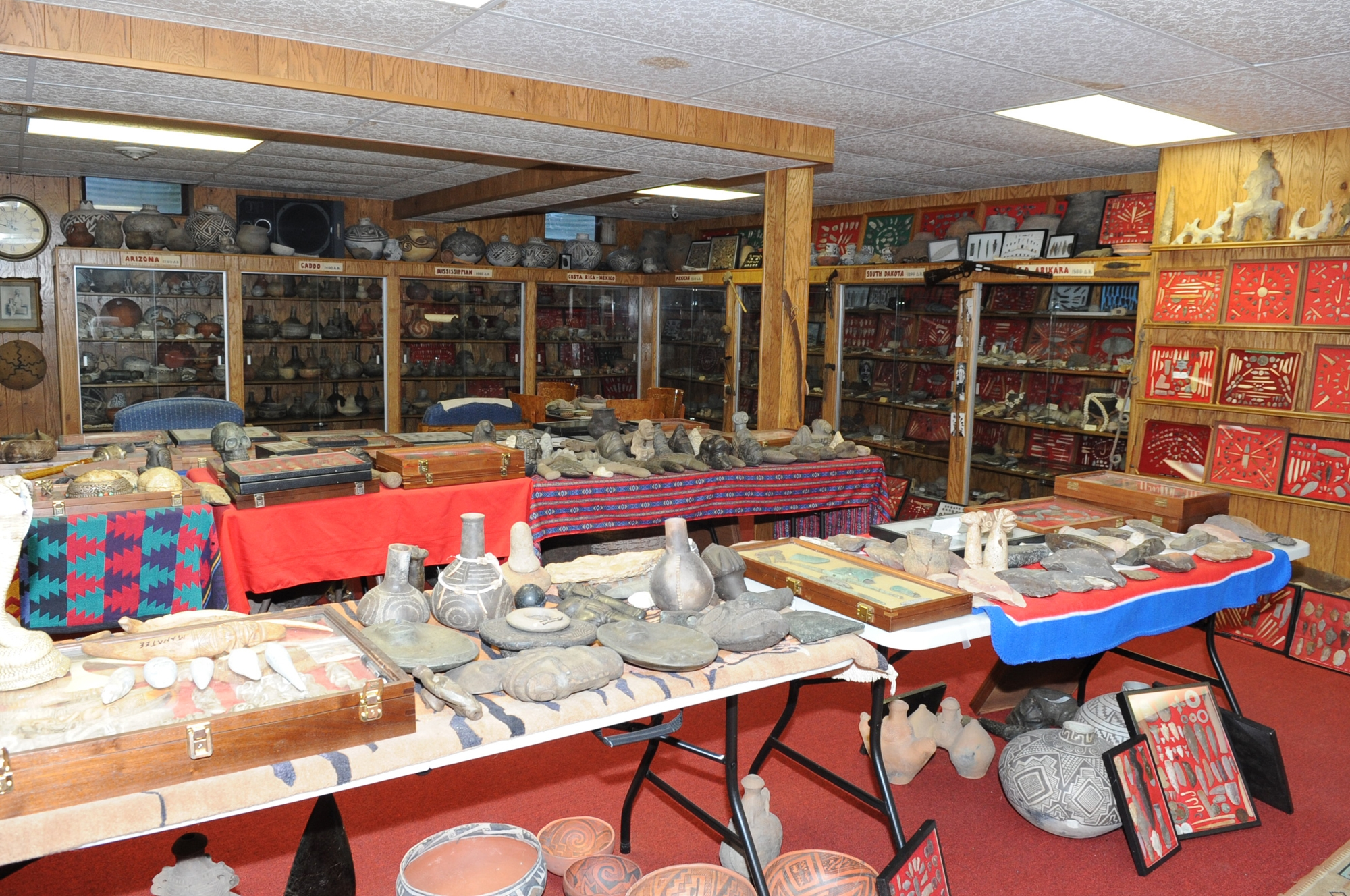
A portion of Don Miller's private collection. This photo was taken during the 2014 recovery of artifacts conducted by the FBI Art Crime Team.

Following this initial visit, the FBI launched an investigation into Miller's collection. He was suspected of "knowingly or unknowingly improperly recovering artifacts" and violating treaties in his collection of items abroad. The artifacts that Miller collected spanned North America, South America, Asia, the Caribbean, and Papua New Guinea. Carpenter believes that Miller's passion was Native American cultural artifacts, which comprised the bulk of his collection.

Tim Carpenter led the recovery effort in April 2014. Miller ultimately cooperated with the investigation and teams of federal agents and scientists erected tents on his property to process the artifacts. At that time, Miller's collection was estimated to contain 42,000 artifacts of historical and cultural significance and the FBI Art Crime Team seized more than 7,000 artifacts. The recovery operation was complicated due to the sheer quantity of objects and their cultural, historical, and spiritual significance. The operation lasted six days.

Despite the seizure of illegally recovered artifacts from his property, Miller was not arrested or charged with a crime by the FBI. He was 90 years old when the FBI conducted their investigation and his advanced age may have influenced the decision to forgo charges. He died less than one year after the FBI raid on his home.

== Human remains and repatriation ==
Notably, Miller's collection included over 2,000 human bones from an estimated 500 individuals that were looted from Native American burial grounds. FBI agents discovered an articulated skeleton in a display case and Miller claimed that it was the remains of Crazy Horse, a famous Lakota war leader. It was later discovered that this skeleton was actually an amalgamation of bones from several individuals that Miller had allegedly glued together. Agents also discovered skulls that were pierced with arrowheads, which were also apparently staged by Miller. Carpenter reported that some of the bones were neatly arranged and displayed while others were wrapped in black garbage bags and stored in a defunct fallout shelter. The FBI partnered with tribal authorities and academics to identify the origins of the remains and attempt to repatriate them. Pete Coffey, a tribal official of the Mandan, Hidatsa, and Arikara nations, emphasized the damage that has been caused by Miller's actions and the spiritual importance of returning ancestors' remains to their resting places.

The process of repatriating remains has been particularly difficult for several reasons. Many of the bones were intermingled and stored in a disorganized fashion with few clues to their origins. DNA analysis may assist in identification, but would require invasive procedures. Under the request of Native tribes that they have consulted with, Carpenter's team does not want to cause "further offense to the ancestral remains" by attempting to extract DNA.

Holly Cusack-McVeigh, a professor of anthropology and museum studies at Indiana University-Purdue University Indianapolis has been a key partner in repatriating the recovered artifacts and remains. As of 2019, the FBI estimated that only 15% of the recovered artifacts had been repatriated. The FBI is hoping that experts will contact them to review collections relevant to their area of expertise to assist in the repatriation process. As of 2019, items had been repatriated to Canada, Cambodia, Mexico, Ecuador, New Zealand, Papua New Guinea, Spain, China, and Haiti. Attempts at the repatriation of artifacts and remains that were seized from Miller are ongoing.
