= Rick Eldridge =

American politician (born 1957)

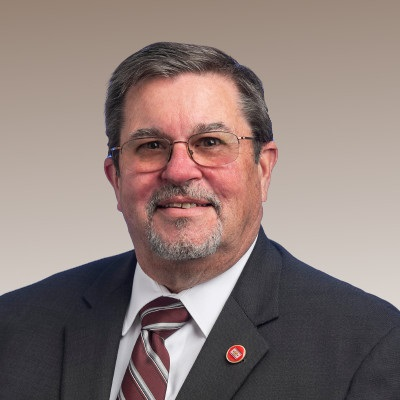
- Eldridge in 2021

Member of the Tennessee House of Representatives from the 10th district
- Incumbent
- Assumed office January 8, 2019
- Preceded by: Tilman Goins

Personal details
- Born: July 12, 1957 (age 69)
- Party: Republican
- Children: 2
- Website: House website

Rick Eldridge (born July 12, 1957) is an American politician. He is a Republican representing the 10th district, encompassing Grainger County and the western portion of Hamblen County, in the Tennessee House of Representatives.

== Political career ==
Eldridge served as a Hamblen County commissioner for eight years, including two terms as chairman.

In 2018, Eldridge ran for election to the District 10 seat in the Tennessee House of Representatives, which was being vacated by Tilman Goins. He defeated Tommy Pedigo in the Republican primary, and Democrat Barbara Simmons in the general election.

In 2020, Eldridge ran unopposed in both the Republican primary and general election, being re-elected on November 3, 2020 with 17,133 votes.

In August 2021, Eldridge joined all the state house Republicans in signing a letter to call for a special session to take action against schools requiring masks. Governor Bill Lee issued an executive order allowing parents to opt students out of school mask mandates instead of calling the special session. In October 2021, Eldridge voted in favor of a bill allowing partisan elections for school boards, which have traditionally been nonpartisan in Tennessee. In December 2021, Eldridge voiced his opposition to the state's new redistricting plan that would split Hamblen County in half with District 10 in the west and District 11 in the east. He stated he would vote no on the plan.

In 2023, Eldridge supported a resolution to expel Democratic lawmakers from the legislature for violating decorum rules. The expulsion was widely characterized as unprecedented.

== Current committees ==
As of December 2021, Eldridge sits on the following committees:

- State Committee (Vice-Chair)
- Children and Family Affairs Subcommittee
- Civil Justice Committee
- Corrections Subcommittee
- Naming, Designating, & Private Acts Committee
- Covid-19 Committee of the Third Extraordinary Session

== Electoral record ==
2018 Republican primary: Tennessee House of Representatives, District 10
Party	Candidate	Votes	%
Republican	Rick Eldridge	4,435	62.8%
Republican	Tommy Pedigo	2,532	37.2%

2018 general election: Tennessee House of Representatives, District 10
Party	Candidate	Votes	%
Republican	Rick Eldridge	12,941	75.4%
Democratic	Barbara Simmons	4,214	24.6%

2020 Republican primary: Tennessee House of Representatives, District 10
Party	Candidate	Votes	%
Republican	Rick Eldridge	3,967	100.0%

2020 general election: Tennessee House of Representatives, District 10
Party	Candidate	Votes	%
Republican	Rick Eldridge	17,156	100.0%

2022 Republican primary: Tennessee House of Representatives, District 10
Party	Candidate	Votes	%
Republican	Rick Eldridge	3,203	74.7%
Republican	Donel Shelton	1,085	25.3%

2022 general election: Tennessee House of Representatives, District 10
Party	Candidate	Votes	%
Republican	Rick Eldridge	12,258	99.0%

2024 Republican primary: Tennessee House of Representatives, District 10
Party	Candidate	Votes	%
Republican	Rick Eldridge	3,197	100.0%

2024 general election: Tennessee House of Representatives, District 10
Party	Candidate	Votes	%
Republican	Rick Eldridge	22,293	99.1%
Independent	Nathan Dressel	212	0.9%
