= Mechanical Gecko =

The Speedy Freelander, also dubbed the Mechanical Gecko in press sources, is an intelligent robot from 2008. It was developed by Li Xiaoyang and his research group at Zhuhai New Concept Aerospace.

== History and design ==
In robotics and mechanical engineering, on November 15, 2008, China's Technology Daily reported Dr. Danny H. Y. Li and his research group of the New Concept Aircraft (ZHUHAI) Co., Ltd. had recently successfully developed a mechanical gecko named "Speedy Freelander".

The "Speedy Freelander" was described as an intelligent robot with a compact and flexible body, with possible uses in search, rescue, counter-terrorism, as well as scientific experiments and scientific exploration.

"Freelander" uses optical, electromagnetic sensing and new communication methods, and optical, mechanical and electronic integration technology. According to the introduction by Dr. Li, the artificial intelligence robot can rapidly climb up and down a variety of building walls, ground and wall fissures, and walk upside-down on the ceiling. It is able to adapt to the surfaces of smooth glass, rough, sticky or dusty walls as well as the various types of metallic materials. It can also identify and circumvent obstacles automatically, with flexibility and speed comparable to a gecko.
