= Arachno-Bot =

Articulated robot

The robot spider's legs are 20 centimeters long. Elastic bellows drives serve as joints. © Fraunhofer IPA

The arachno-bot is a soft articulated robot design that serves as a survey device to collect information in areas deemed too toxic or dangerous for humans. The arachno-bot was developed in 2011 by a team of researchers at the Fraunhofer Institute of Manufacturing Engineering and Automation in Stuttgart, Germany. The team of researchers developed the arachno-bot as a means to improve pilot-controlled robotics. The arachno-bot's name originates from the distinct shape of the robot, as its 8 legs resemble a spider's. Each leg consists of a spider-inspired electro-hydraulic soft-actuated joint (S.E.S) which is the core of an arachno-bot. The S.E.S enables the arachno-bot to perform functions other robots can't do, such as crawl, climb, and jump. These functions an arachno-bot can perform are due to the different types of joints an arachno-bot can equip. Such S.E.S. joints include a bidirectional joint, a three-fingered gripper joint, and a multi-segmented artificial limb joint. Despite all these capabilities, an arachno-bot can perform, it can be manufactured at a low cost, due to the affordability of its materials and labor. The majority of an arachno-bot consists of plastic (a cheap material) and is built by a 3D printer. The 3D printer lays thin layers of fine plastic powder that are melted together by selective laser sintering.

== Why arachnids? ==
The research team from the Fraunhofer Institute of Manufacturing Engineering and Automation chose to study spiders for their capabilities in locomotion (movement). A spider's locomotion allows it access to areas that modern technology and humans can not due to their joints. A spider's mechanics in movement are largely due to the anatomy of their legs and joints. This is why the research team decided to build a spider-like joint for a possible arachno-bot, a spider-inspired electro-hydraulic soft-actuated joint.

== Spider Inspired Electro Hydraulic Soft-actuated Joints (S.E.S.) ==
The leg component of an arachno-bot is its core. Each of the 8 legs is equipped with S.E.S joints that mimic a spider's mechanics. A spider's leg joints are the mechanics that the arachno-bot's artificial legs mimic in the spider-inspired electrohydraulic soft-actuated joints (S.E.S for short). A spider's leg, much like a human's finger, has multiple joints embedded in it which allow for movement. The joints in a human finger allow for the ability to curl one's finger, which is the exact movement a spider's leg implements to walk, climb, and grab objects.

=== Components ===
The composition of a spider-inspired electro-hydraulic soft-actuated joint consists of a pouch that's filled with dielectric fluid (a vegetable-based oil), and two electrodes placed on either side of the pouch. The pouch is then attached to a rotary joint. When high voltage is applied between electrodes the electrostatic forces cause the dielectric liquid to move inside the pouch and flex the joint. Flexing of the joint causes the arachno-bot's legs to move. Each S.E.S leg is composed of both rigid and soft materials so when put together it acts as an animal's leg through hydraulic forces. The rigid and soft materials that form a spider's leg are mostly rigid (don't bend) besides the joints where the soft material is used to allow the joints to bend. Much like a human leg, where the femur, tibia, and fibula do not bend, the joints connecting to them do, which allows for movement of the limb. In addition to each leg being equipped with S.E.S technology, they are also equipped with jumping-capable technology. Each leg is equipped with fluid and a compressor pump. The compressor pump pressurizes the fluid and the pressurized fluid allows for the legs to jump.

=== Forces ===
Each leg utilizes a hydraulic force (A hydraulic force is a force that is transmitted through a pressurized fluid) that is produced from electrostatic forces. The electrostatic force is generated from the voltage that passes through the dielectric fluid. The voltage that is applied is positively charged which repulses the positively charged particles in the dielectric fluid. The repulsive force of the positively charged particles is the force that transfers into the hydraulic force that causes the joint to bend. The repulsive force transfers into a hydraulic force due to the nature of the process, the electrostatic force is created in a fluid, therefore any force it creates is an electrohydraulic force or hydraulic force. The voltage that enters the pouch through one electrode exits through the other ground electrode on the other side of the pouch so that there isn't a constant hydraulic force bending the joint.

=== Joint Variability ===
To make the arachno-bot more practical there are 3 different potential limbs an arachno-bot could have. The three varieties of limbs are a bidirectional joint, a three-fingered joint, and a multi-segmented artificial limb. Each joint operates with the same S.E.S. system, but the placement and quantity of the actuators are different.

==== Bidirectional ====
A bidirectional limb has actuation in two directions. The joint for a bidirectional limb is created from antagonistic (opposite) actuator pairs coupled to a bidirectional hinge. Two actuators with liquid dielectric (vegetable-based oil) are attached to either side of the bidirectional hinge that is composed of flexible film stiffeners that are connected to a two-sided adhesive transparency. The two actuators have 3 electrodes in total. The inner electrode is the ground electrode, where the voltage that's applied can exit. The other two electrodes are independent of each other as they apply voltage to different actuators that are on opposite sides of the joint. Each actuator is responsible for one-half of the bidirectional movement the bidirectional joint can perform. Meaning if one actuator bends the joint downwards then the other bends the joint upwards, but both are independent of each other. The two actuators allow the limb they are attached to have a movement of 20 degrees in either direction at high speeds.

==== Three-fingered Gripper ====
A three-fingered gripper limb can firmly grab and hold onto objects. The three-fingered gripper resembles the claw from a claw machine but has two joints and two actuators per finger. Of the two actuators, one is at the base of the finger, and the other is at the end of the finger. Each actuator allows for the curl of the finger to grip an object. The actuator at the base of the finger bends the fingertip, which also has an actuator that bends the compliant end effector (flexible and supple). The compliant end effector is deformed to increase the contact area when picking objects. The compliant end effector is made from material with high friction on its surface which is more effective than the bare acrylic of the S.E.S. This allows for the three-fingered gripper to grab objects up to 270 grams from a horizontal and vertical surface.

==== Multi-segmented artificial limb ====
A multi-segmented artificial limb is a limb with 3 actuators, allowing the limbs to have a greater range of motion in a bidirectional actuation. The multi-segmented artificial limb has three independently controlled actuators that all have 3 independent S.E.S joint series. The limb is designed with a tapered structure so that all the actuators fit to size. Each limb has 3 segments that each have different but smaller sizes from the base of the limb going down. The largest of the three actuators is the one closer to the base because it needs more power to lift the weight of the limb. The weight of the limb plus the weight of the other 2 actuators requires that the actuators at the base be bigger to provide more of a torque force that can lift the limb. The other two actuators are for the flexibility of the limb. The multiple-segmented artificial limb has 3 sections, with each section meeting at a joint. There are 3 joints on the limb, and each joint's flexibility is controlled by the actuator that corresponds to that section. The actuator in the middle section controls the portion of the limb beneath it and so forth. The three actuators share a ground connection but have 3 independent high-voltage leads controlled by a three-channel high-voltage power supply. The 3 actuators and limb put together allow for the limb to have a moment of almost 180 degrees with no load (no additional weight on the limb), and a variety of movement speeds that range from slow to fast.

== Future applications ==
The arachno-bot is a newly developed technology to improve piloted controlled robotics for surveying. Therefore, its applications may be limited to the release of the arachno-bot, but future applications may include: surveying of toxic areas, surveying of areas deemed to be perilous for humans, or surveying of areas that are inaccessible to humans and modern technological divides.
