= Joseph Laws McKibben =

American physicist and engineer

Joseph L. McKibben
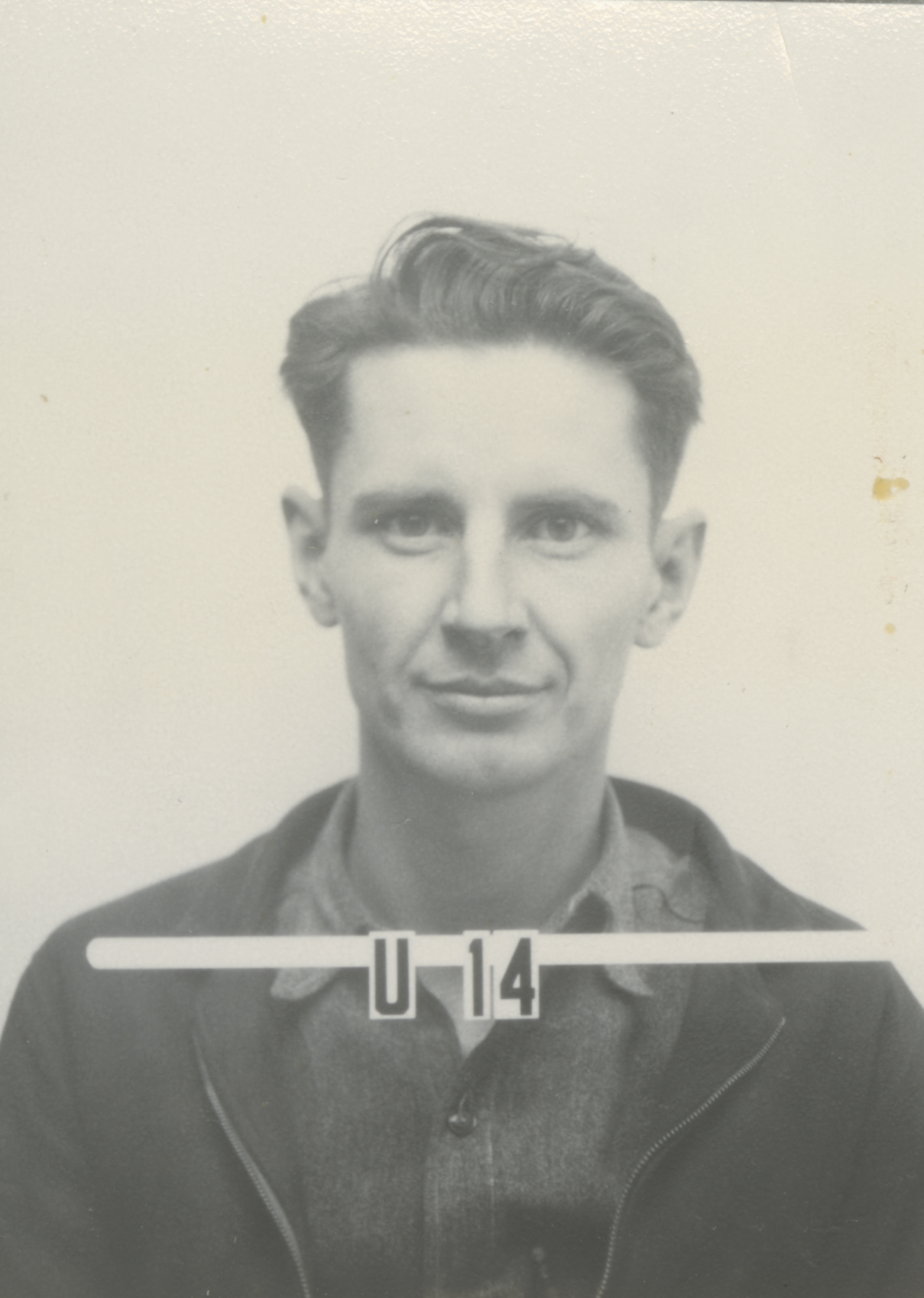
- Joseph L. McKibben
- Born: 1912; Missouri
- Died: 2001 (aged 88–89); Los Alamos, New Mexico
- Education: University of Wisconsin
- Scientific career
- Workplaces: University of Wisconsin; Los Alamos National Laboratory

Joseph Laws McKibben (1912 – 2001) was an American physicist and engineer who worked with J. Robert Oppenheimer as a group leader on the Manhattan Project. He personally witnessed the Trinity test and flipped the switches that activated the timers that set off the atomic bomb at Trinity.

McKibben, motivated by his daughter Karan's paralysed hands due to polio, also invented the Air Muscle in 1957.

He was born in 1912 in Missouri. He died in 2001 in Los Alamos, aged 89. His remains, and those of his wife and daughter, were interred at Guaje Pines Cemetery in Los Alamos.
