= John Litz =

American politician (born 1961)

Member of the Tennessee House of Representatives from the 10th district
- In office January 14, 2003 – January 11, 2011
- Preceded by: Stancil Ford
- Succeeded by: Don Miller

Personal details
- Born: July 24, 1961 (age 65)
- Party: Democratic
- Spouse: Lisa Litz
- Education: University of Tennessee (BS)
- Website: House website

John Litz (born July 24, 1961) is a United States Democratic Party politician, formerly serving as a State Representative in Tennessee. He represented District 10, Hamblen County.

== Biography ==
John Litz hold a B.S. degree in Agriculture from the University of Tennessee and makes his living as a farmer, operating Litz Farms in Hamblen County. He was first elected to the General Assembly in 2002 defeating Republican incumbent Stancil Ford. He served as a House member of the 103rd, 104th and 105th General Assemblies serving on the following committees:

- Secretary, House Calendar and Rules Committee
- Member, House Agriculture Committee
- Member, House State and Local Committee
- Vice Chair, House Elections Subcommittee

In November 2006, Litz was re-elected without opposition to a 3rd term. In December 2006, he was selected by the Democratic Caucus to serve as Assistant Majority Leader. In September 2007, Litz announced his intention to retire from the legislature after his current term expired.
