= Donald Miller (serial killer) =

American serial killer

- Born: 1941; Los Angeles, California, U.S.
- Died: October 14, 2005 (aged 64); San Quentin State Prison, San Quentin, California, U.S.
- Other name: Robert Maxie
- Convictions: Murder x4 Attempted murder x4
- Penalty: Death

Details
- Victims: 5
- Span of crimes: 1977–1981
- Country: United States
- State: California
- Date apprehended: February 27, 1981

Donald Miller (1941 – October 14, 2005) was an American serial killer who murdered one woman and later four gay men in Los Angeles County, California, from 1977 to 1981. He was convicted and sentenced to death for four of these killings in 1983, but died awaiting execution in 2005.

== Early life and crimes ==
Very little is known about the early years of Miller's life. He was born in 1941 in Los Angeles in a family with several other brothers and sisters. He grew up in Compton, where he attended the local high school. Despite the fact that his father left the family in 1952 and the family subsequently experienced financial difficulties, Miller did well in school and at the time did not exhibit any aggressive behavior.

After graduation, Miller learned a number of specialties in construction and manufacturing, but soon turned to stealing, for which he was convicted in 1962. In the 1970s, Miller began to show signs of mental illness and started to become more aggressive towards women.

=== Initial attacks ===
In April 1975, Miller picked up an underage hitchhiker named Bettina Grodman in Los Angeles, introducing himself as "Robert". During the trip, Grodman asked him to drive her home, but Miller refused and instead threatened to harm her. For four hours, he drove around aimlessly through the streets of Los Angeles, after which he took Grodman to his home, where he raped her. At one point, when Grodman screamed, Miller began choking her and threatened to kill her, but later let her go. Grodman immediately went to the police and testified against Miller, who was arrested. He cooperated with police and accepted a plea deal, and because Grodman had previously been involved in prostitution, the rape charge was dropped and replaced with assault with intent to cause grievous bodily harm.

In March 1979, Miller was arrested on charges of attempted assault against his co-worker, John Harmon. Harmon claimed that he got into an altercation with Miller at the railroad station where they worked at. On the day of the incident, Miller provoked him in every way possible and spray painted his arm, and when Harman started getting angry, Miller threw a cup of hot coffee in his face and a fight ensued. Harman claimed that after their shift had ended, Miller chased him in his automobile and threatened to kill him by waving a piece of steel pipe, but the case never went to trial.

In August, Miller brutally beat Linda Lee in the freight elevator of a downtown Los Angeles hotel where she was staying. During the attack, Lee suffered a broken jaw in two places, a fractured ankle, and lacerations above her ear and eye that required twelve stitches. Lee lost consciousness during the attack and also dislocated her wrist in the fall. She was hospitalized for thirteen days and underwent several surgeries, but could not identify her assailant until after Miller's 1981 arrest.

=== Characterization ===
In the late 1970s, Miller found work as a welder for the Southern Pacific Railroad, where he worked until his arrest. He was unmarried and was seen visiting gay bars located throughout the Los Angeles area, but claimed that he was not bisexual.

Acquaintances and relatives had mixed emotions regarding Miller. His mother, brothers and sisters stated that he maintained close ties with them and was never violent. Several of his acquaintances and co-workers stated after his arrest that he never showed signs of antisocial behavior, but also noted that he had no close friends, did not maintain trusting relationships with them, and liked to keep to himself.

== Murders ==
From July 1980 to February 1981, Miller perpetrated at least eight attacks on gay men, all but one of which occurred in the western part of Hollywood on weekends or holidays. Each attack happened at midnight near roads or dark alleys, after most of the victims had left gay bars.

- Miller's first fatality was 32-year-old florist Michael Thomas, who was killed in the early morning hours of July 12, 1980. His body was found on a street with severe head injuries, and while he was still alive when located, he succumbed to his injuries at a hospital only hours later. An autopsy determined that Thomas had been struck about 4 times with a heavy blunt object. Thomas' body was found near the home of Pam Kobak, who told police that she was awakened after midnight by her dog barking, then looked out her front window and saw two men leaning against the driver's side of a dark-colored sports car parked across the street. She claimed the car was a Datsun 280Z with wide silver side moldings and louvers on the rear window. Kobak then sat down to watch television, but soon returned to the window due to the continued barking of her dogs, through which she saw the car drive away with the driver in it. As the vehicle drove away, Kobak noticed the silhouette of a body lying on the road near where the car was parked. The investigation revealed that shortly before his death, Thomas, along with a friend named Tim White and another man, were seen at a gay bar called "The Spike". White testified that Thomas, a gay man, was heavily intoxicated and then disappeared when he and his buddy went to the restroom. Police officers found a pool of blood near Thomas' body, as well as two coins and a matchbook, but no wallet or other forms of identification.
- Miller's second victim was 36-year-old hair stylist Robert Sanderson, who was killed on November 30. At 1:30 AM, a security guard spotted Sanderson at the corner of Melrose Avenue and Crescent Heights Boulevard, about six blocks from a gay bar called "The Rusty Nail". The officer testified that Sanderson appeared conscious but badly beaten, and although he was visibly dazed and confused, the officer was able to learn his name and that he had been struck several times in the head with a steel object, after which he finally fell into unconsciousness. Sanderson received medical attention, but fell into a coma and later died on February 12, 1981. An autopsy determined that the cause of death was several strikes to the head with a blunt object. At the scene, investigators found bloodstains on the curb and on a telephone pole at the corner of Melrose and Crescent Heights. It was determined that Sanderson managed to walk nearly a block after the attack, bleeding out with a shaky gait, before being discovered by the officer. Police also found several small items at the scene where the attack took place, including a lighter, a small piece of metal and a piece of paper with the license plate number and the words "yellow Ford" written on it. Investigators learned that shortly before his death, Sanderson had gone to a gay bar called "The Rusty Nail" with his friend, Clinton Lawler. Sanderson's apartment was six and a half blocks away from The Spike, where Michael Thomas was last seen, and just a block away from The Rusty Nail. Lawler told police during questioning that he left Sanderson at The Rusty Nail around 11:30 PM, but returned half an hour later to find that his friend was no longer there. He searched for Sanderson at his apartment and then at several nearby bars, but could not locate him.
- In the early morning hours of January 23, 1981, Miller killed 22-year-old Danny Harman, whose corpse was found in Compton after an anonymous tipster notified local police. Harman had been hit several times on the head with a blunt instrument, due to which the right side of his skull was cracked and his ear was damaged. No wallet, money or identification for Harman was found at the crime scene, and his pants' pockets were turned inside out. A red plastic comb and shoe shine brush were found next to the body. Investigators later learned that Harman was a vagrant from Kentucky who had arrived in Los Angeles just months prior. A gay man, he engaged in intimate relationships with several men before meeting a man named Robert Wertz, who soon became his boyfriend and invited him to live at his place. The night prior to his murder, Wertz invited Harman to have dinner at a restaurant near their apartment - they arrived at approximately 9:30 PM, but Wertz soon felt ill and went home an hour later. According to him, Harman promised him that we would also come back after finishing his dinner, but ended up staying at the restaurant until midnight. Joseph Morris, a waiter at the restaurant, told police after the finishing his shift, he and Harman went to a gay bar called "Woody's Hyperion", which was in Silver Lake. Morris claimed that Harman went missing from the bar when he met some acquaintances there and went to play pool with them. Within minutes, Morris began searching for him both inside and outside the bar, but could not find him.
- On February 13, Miller attacked 28-year-old hairdresser Ernesto Ramirez after he met him at The Rusty Nail. One of the last people to see Ramirez alive was his friend, Mario Aguirre, who told police that they had been at the New Town Saloon gay bar in Hollywood. Aguirre said that they arrived at The Rusty Nail at around midnight, where they met Miller, who offered Ramirez a ride in his car, after which they left. Miller then drove Ramirez six blocks away from the gay bar, where he struck him several times with a steel pipe. Ramirez was found on the next body, having suffered massive injuries to his skull and facial bones, as well as lacerations to his right ear and surrounding area. He was taken to a nearby hospital, where he remained in a coma until his death on April 20. During an examination of the crime scene, investigators found a partially smoked marijuana cigarette in the grass. On February 20, Aguirre appeared at the police station where he gave a statement that led to a sketch being drawn of the supposed killer. Aguirre told law enforcement officers that he had previously encountered the perpetrator several times at The Rusty Nail, after which police officers convinced him to accompany him on a stakeout in hopes of finding the man who had accompanied Ramirez. That evening, Aguirre, accompanied by two law enforcement officers, saw Donald Miller on the street on his way to a gay bar. After Aguirre identified him as the man who had taken Ramirez away, Miller was apprehended. While searching him, the officers found some keys, including a car key - Miller then led them to his car, which was a black Datsun 280Z with silver side moldings and grilles on the rear window, similar to the one seen by Pamela Kobak on the night of Michael Thomas' murder. While examining the interior of the car, police found a piece of metal pipe, at which point Miller was officially arrested and charged with the murders.

=== Discovery of other assaults ===
After Miller's arrest, investigators attempted to find out if he was involved in any other unsolved crimes. To this end, they reviewed existing crime reports, sent inquiries to law enforcement agencies across California, published information in the media and distributed flyers in gay bars across Hollywood and other areas of Los Angeles. The flyers contained a general description of the crimes and Miller's appearance, with a request that anybody with pertinent information come forward.

Not long after, information surfaced that allowed investigators to link Miller to four non-fatal assaults dating back to May 1980.

- On May 23, 1980, Richard Sulita flew from Chicago, Illinois to Los Angeles, where he hoped to find a friend who resided in Hollywood. Sulita claimed that while en route to a gay bar on Santa Monica Boulevard, he was offered a ride by a dark-skinned man who drove a black Datsun 280Z with silver side moldings and grilles on the rear window. During the ride, the man suggested that they go to his house, but Sulita declined. The man then offered him $20 in exchange for sexual favors, but Sulita turned him down again and demanded that he stop the car, which the driver did. About five minutes later, Sulita was still on Santa Monica Boulevard when the same car pulled up to him. He claimed that the man apologized for his behavior and offered Sulita another ride, which he accepted. A few minutes later, they turned into an alley and stopped, whereupon the driver offered to smoke some marijuana with Sulita. Sulita refused and got out of the car, but was almost immediately struck on the back of the head with a metal pipe. He managed to block the next blow with his hand and then fell to the ground, managing to kick his assailant. While the man was distracted, Sulita got up and ran away. Sulita flagged down a passing police car and told them what had happened, after which he was taken to a nearby hospital, where he received seven stitches to the back of his head. He returned to Chicago a few days later, and had no further contact with the police until March 1981. At that time, he received a call from Detective Michael Tice, who wanted to question him about the attack. Tice then flew to Chicago to speak with Sulita, and during the conversation, he showed the man six photographs - one of which was of Miller. Sulita could not identify him with certainty, but said that Miller bore a strong resemblance to his assailant.
- On October 17, a resident of San Francisco named Rodolfo Pambid went to Hollywood to visit friends. Upon his arrival in the city, he went to The Spike to find a friend named Ray Parker. He was unable to find him, but then came across a dark-skinned man who, according to Pambid, offered to smoke marijuana with him. Pambid refused and soon left, travelling on foot to The Rusty Nail. Pambid claimed that while he was on his way to the bar, a dark-colored Datsun 280Z pulled up next to him, driven by the same man who had approached him at The Spike. The driver offered him a ride, and Pambid got in the car. After traveling a short distance, the driver pulled over and stopped. Pambid, thinking that they had to walk on foot, got out of the car and waited, but was alarmed when he saw the man pull out an object from behind his seat and approached him. Pambid said that the man attempted to strike him several times with some sort of heavy metal object, but he managed to block the attacks and run away. He did not report the incident to the police until six months later, when he read a newspaper article asking for information about the attacks in Hollywood. Detectives visited him at his home in San Francisco and presented him with six photographs, from which Pambid positively identified Donald Miller as his assailant.
- On December 31, a man named Michael Pietila was celebrating a New Year's Eve party in Hollywood, where he remained until 0:15, at which time he left to attend another party which was taking place in another part of the neighborhood. He claimed that a dark-skinned man in a dark-colored Datsun 280Z offered him a ride there - Pietila was vaguely acquainted with Miller, whom he knew as "Robert", as they had met in a gay bar in 1978. According to Pietila, they were driving down Santa Monica Boulevard, but "Robert" turned onto an alley and suddenly stopped the car. "Robert" offered Pietila to go to his place in Long Beach, but Pietila declined, instead accepting to drink alcohol and perform oral sex on him. After the sexual intercourse ended, Pietila again exclaimed that he did not want to go to his house, after which he left the car and started walking towards the party venue. However, "Robert" became enraged and attacked him with a heavy metal object - Pietila managed to evade his attacks and managed to escape due to the darkness of the night. He did not report the incident to the police until eight months later, when he saw a flyer about the murders at The Spike. During the investigation, Pietila and his sister confidently identified Donald Miller as the assailant, with the sister claiming that she had met him twice in March 1979 and that he also introduced himself as "Robert" to her. She stated that she stopped seeing him after her brother informed her that he was visiting gay bars.
- On February 20, 1981, a man named Douglas Allison was spending the night at a Hollywood bar called The Gold Coast, together with his roommate William Hurd and a third friend named Derrah. Hurd claimed that Allison had at least $50 and a lighter on him, and after staying for about 45 minutes, he said good night to his friends and left for The Rusty Nail. Along the way, Allison came across Miller, who struck him several times on the head with a steel pipe, inflicting multiple injuries on Allison's face and fracturing his upper and lower jaw. As a result of the assault, Allison was left comatose for about two months and was later diagnosed with amnesia. While he was unable to recall what exactly had transpired on that night, he remembered that his attacker was a black man, as Allison himself said that he preferred to have white sexual partners. In an attempt to gain more information from him, Allison was hypnotized and later gave a description of his attacker, from which a sketch was made that closely resembled Miller. However, when Allison was shown a photograph of him, he said that he did not remember him or seeing him in any of the gay bars he had visited in his free time.

== Trial ==
After his arrest, Miller refused to cooperate with the authorities and claimed that he was innocent. As much of the prosecution's evidence was circumstantial and the available testimonies not very reliable, there were doubts on whether Miller was the actual perpetrator. The key piece of evidence that linked him to the killings was the piece of steel pipe found in his car, but no traces of blood or skin particles were found on it.

Despite this, prosecutors contended that Miller was guilty, due to the aforementioned steel pipe; the victims being injured on the head and the fact that a car similar to his was seen by at least three of the survivors and near the crime scenes of at least two of the murders. Miller himself was unable to provide an alibi for the days of the crimes, only proclaiming that he could not remember where he was or what he was doing at the time, and that he had never met any of the victims.

His trial began in July 1983 and lasted over two months. During the proceedings, Miller initially continued to claim that he was innocent, but halfway through it suddenly started arguing with his attorney and demanding that he enter a guilty plea, for which both he and his attorney were reprimanded by the court. On October 3, a jury found Miller guilty on all counts, and on November 11, he was officially sentenced to death. Miller maintained complete composure and expressed no emotion while the verdict was read out. After the verdict was announced, Miller's lawyer, Jay Jaffe, told the media that for some reason his client stopped protesting his innocence and said that he preferred to be executed rather than spend the rest of his life in jail.

== Death and posthumous findings ==
Miller spent the remainder of his life on death row at the San Quentin State Prison. He attempted to appeal his sentence, but his final appeal was rejected by the Supreme Court of California in 1991. He started experiencing health issues in the early 2000s and was later diagnosed with a number of cardiovascular diseases, from complications of which he died on October 14, 2005.

Approximately a year after his death, he was linked via DNA to the 1977 murder of 20-year-old Camilla Stasse, a college student, professional musician and union activist who was raped and stabbed to death at her apartment in Long Beach. However, since he was already deceased, he could not be prosecuted for this case.

== See also ==
- List of serial killers in the United States
- Capital punishment in California
