= Don Miller (Tennessee politician) =

American politician (born 1956)

Member of the Tennessee House of Representatives from the 10th district
- In office January 11, 2011 – January 8, 2013
- Preceded by: John Litz
- Succeeded by: Tilman Goins

Personal details
- Born: August 19, 1956 (age 70) Montgomery, Alabama, U.S.
- Party: Republican
- Spouse: Traci Miller
- Children: 2
- Education: Auburn University (BS); Southwestern Baptist Theological Seminary (MRE)
- Website: House website

Don Miller (born August 19, 1956) was a one-term Republican member of the Tennessee House of Representatives for the 10th district, encompassing Morristown and Hamblen County.

== Education and personal life ==
Don Miller was born on August 19, 1956, in Montgomery, Alabama. He received a B.S. in Government & Business from Auburn University, and an M.R.E. from Southwestern Baptist Theological Seminary.

Before running for office, he worked as a business administrator for Manley Baptist Church in Morristown. He is a member of the National Rifle Association of America and the Hamblen County Republican Party.

He is married to Traci, with two children, Matthew and Meagan. He is a Baptist.

== Political career ==
In 2008, he was elected as a delegate to the 2008 Republican National Convention for John McCain.

In 2011, he was elected as the Republican state Assemblyman for the 10th district, the seat formerly represented by John Litz.

In 2012, Don Miller was defeated in a Republican primary race by Representative Tilman Goins.
