= Tilman Goins =

American politician (born 1977)

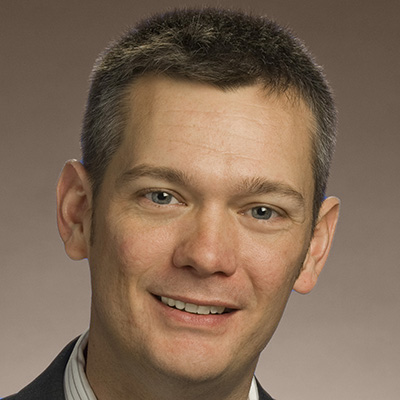
- Goins in 2013

Member of the Tennessee House of Representatives from the 10th district
- In office January 8, 2013 – January 8, 2019
- Preceded by: Don Miller
- Succeeded by: Rick Eldridge

Personal details
- Born: April 10, 1977 (age 49)
- Party: Republican
- Children: 1
- Education: Walters State Community College (AS); East Tennessee State University (BA, BS)
- Website: House website

Military service
- Allegiance: United States
- Branch/service: United States Marines; United States Army
- Years of service: 1996-2004

Tilman Goins (born April 10, 1977) is an American politician and a Republican who represented District 10 in the Tennessee House of Representatives from 2013 to 2018, and a former county commissioner from Hamblen County, TN. He is a veteran of both the US Marine Corps and the US Army.

== Education ==
Goins is a graduate of Morristown-Hamblen High School West. He earned an AS in history and geography from Walters State Community College and a BA in international affairs, BS in history, and an MPA in Public Finance from East Tennessee State University.

== Public Service ==
Goins was elected to a county commission seat in Hamblen County's 4th district in 2010 after narrowly defeating the 20-year incumbent Bobby Reinhardt. However, after being elected into the TN House of Representatives in 2012, Goins resigned from his commission seat to focus on his state legislative duties.

In 2012, Goins was elected to a seat in the Tennessee House of Representatives for District 10. Goins had challenged incumbent Representative Don Miller during the Republican Primary and won with 52% of the vote.

After serving three terms in the Tennessee House of Representatives, Goins announced on February 20, 2018, that he would not seek reelection for a fourth term.

Goins served as Deputy Commissioner and Chief Operating Officer of the Tennessee Department of Veterans Affairs for two years under Governor Bill Lee.

=== Tennessee House of Representatives ===
Goins' political philosophy is one of personal liberty and limited government. As such, many of the bills sponsored by Goins focused on limiting government involvement in business and personal affairs.

==== Criminal Justice ====
A champion of criminal justice reform, Goins' legislative record includes passing legislation that dedicates criminal justice resources toward those that offended against others. Expanding electronic monitoring funding is an investment that Goins said allows jail space to be free of first-time, lower-level offenders who might be rehabilitated for those repeat violent offenders. Goins sponsored and passed several legislative efforts aimed at enhancing penalties for violent criminals while also making it easier for non-violent, low-level offenders to be reintroduced as productive members of society.

==== Second Amendment ====
Goins championed many 2nd Amendment initiatives while serving in the Tennessee House of Representatives. Goins sponsored and passed several bills to remove state level prohibitions on certain firearms restrictions while in office.

- In 2017 Goins’ Tennessee Hearing Protection Act removed the state’s prohibition on firearm suppressors.
- In 2016 Goins wrote and passed legislation allowing private schools in Tennessee to determine their own policy as it pertains to firearms. During controversial debates on rather or not teachers in colleges or K-12 schools should be able to carry a firearm for protection, Goins argued that at a minimum, the state should not be standing in the way of private schools' ability to decide for themselves. Like any business, the state had no jurisdiction over private school policies and so the commonsense gun measure passed overwhelmingly. The measure also included the ability of private higher education institutions to develop their own firearms policies.
- After the 2015 terrorist attacks against military personnel in Chattanooga, Goins sponsored legislation that would reduce the carry permit age of military personnel in Tennessee to 18 if serving in the Armed Forces. As a result of the attacks, TN National Guard General Hastings began allowing permitted TN National Guard Members to carry a firearm while in uniform. Goins pointed out that 18-21 year olds made up a vast majority of Guard members, they all had some sort of firearms training in Basic Training, and therefore should not be excluded from General Hastings' decree.
- In 2014 Goins introduced a bill which would remove local government abilities to restrict carrying firearms in public parks. The bill failed in its first year, but the effort gained the support of the National Rifle Association of America and was passed in 2015. Goins was a co-sponsor and helped present the bill during its passage on the house floor. In 2022 Goins was vindicated in his efforts at securing citizens rights to bear arms in public places when the Supreme Court of the United States ruled in the New York State Rifle & Pistol Association, Inc. v. Bruen case which affirmed the constitutionally protected right of individuals to keep and bear arms in public places.

== Elections ==
- 2016 Goins was unopposed for the August 4, 2016 Republican Primary receiving 2,724 votes (100%), and was unopposed for the November 8, 2016 General election, winning with 15,374 votes (100%).
- 2014 Goins was unopposed for the August 7, 2014 Republican Primary receiving 4,569 votes (100%), and was unopposed for the November 4, 2014 General election, winning with 9,504 votes (100%).
- 2012 Goins challenged District 10 incumbent Representative Don Miller in the August 2, 2012 Republican Primary, winning with 2,586 votes (52.3%), and was unopposed for the November 6, 2012 General election, winning with 12,781 votes (100%).
- 2010 Goins won a county commission seat in Hamblen County's 4th district. Goins defeated Bobby Reinhardt, who had previously served on the commission for over 20 years.

== Honors and awards ==
- In 2018 Goins was recognized by Tennessee Secretary of State Tre Hargett for his role in helping to garner support for a new Tennessee State Library and Archives building, and was given the National Association of Secretaries of State (NASS) Medallion Award.
- In 2013 Goins was honored by his colleagues in a Tennessee House Resolution for providing emergency first-aid care to a legislative staffer in distress on the day of his swearing in to his first term as State Representative.

== Personal life ==
Goins is married with one child, named Tilman as well.

Goins served in both the US Marines and the US Army.

Goins is a life member of American Mensa.
