= Vaimos =

Autonomous ocean measurement sailing boat

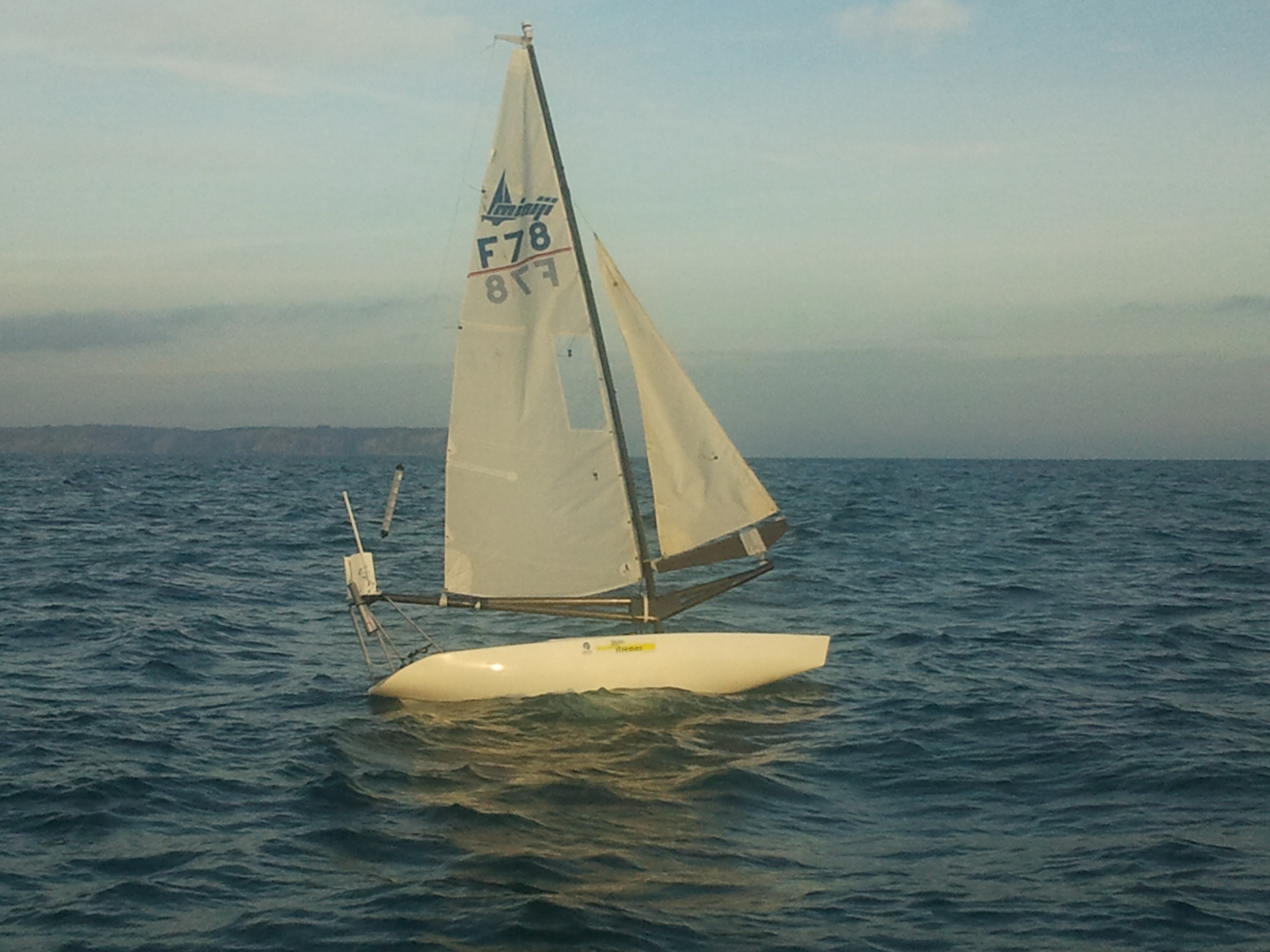
The autonomous sailboat robot Vaimos

Vaimos (Voilier Autonome Instrumenté pour Mesures Océanographiques de Surface) is an autonomous sailing boat with embedded instrumentation for ocean surface measurements.

Its goal is to collect measurements at the surface of the ocean. This robot is the result of a collaboration between ENSTA Bretagne and IFREMER. ENSTA-Bretagne (OSM Team) develops control algorithms and the software architecture, IFREMER (LPO+RDT) builds the mechanics, the embedded instrumentation.

Brest-Douarnenez. One of the longest trips the robot has done is Brest-Douarnenez where Vaimos has done more than 100 km in an autonomous mode. Since Vaimos has made trips more than 350 km long.

In 2013, Vaimos participated in the World Robotic Sailing Championship (WRSC) 2013 in Brest, France .

== Control ==
The robot follows a desired trajectory which is a sequence of lines. When following a line, the robot has two modes.

1. the direct mode: the direction to be followed is consistent with the direction of the wind and the distance between the robot and its line corresponds to the GPS error (approx. 10 meters),
2. the tack mode: the direction to be followed is in the no-go zone and the distance to the line is less than 70 meters.

Two nested control loops are implemented in the computer of Vaimos. The first loop corresponds to a low level controller which tunes the rudder and the sail provided in order to have a desired heading. The second loop generates the desired heading to make the line to follow attractive. With this two loop control strategy, we have the guarantee that the robot will always stay inside the required corridor. This is illustrated the spiral experiment where the robot has to follow a square spiral . The proof that the robot will always stay inside its corridor can be performed using interval analysis and set inversion . The proof assumes that the robot obeys to some uncertain state equations which is not always the case in practice.
