= The Microtransat Challenge =

The Microtransat Challenge is a competition to design and build a sailboat under 2.4 meters in length capable of crossing the Atlantic Ocean without human interaction. There are two classes, sailing and non-sailing, and two divisions, autonomous, which does not allow any human interaction with the boat, and uncrewed, which allows any data including a change of course to be sent to the boat.

The challenge was originally conceived in 2005 by Mark Neal of Aberystwyth University and Yves Briere of ISAE. The first attempt was made on September 11, 2010, by Pinta from Aberystwyth University. According to the organizers, the goal of the challenge is to contribute to ocean-monitoring platforms, as well as provide a learning opportunity. There have been more than 30 attempts; all but one have ended in failure.

The challenge requires entries to use one of two predefined sets of end points. The first is to sail between a start line off the coast of Great Britain and a finish between the Bahamas and Florida, whilst the second is from a start line off the east coast of North America and a finish line on the west coast of Ireland. Competitors can begin whenever they wish, but rules specify that boats should report their position to competition organizers at least once every six hours.

In 2018, SB Met, built by Norwegian company Offshore Sensing AS, became the first and only vehicle to complete the Microtransat Challenge, as well as the first unmanned surface vehicle (USV) to cross the Atlantic Ocean. The vehicle was deployed from Newfoundland on June 7, 2018, and arrived off the coast of Ireland 79 days later, on August 26, 2018.

== External resources ==
- The Microtransat Challenge (website)
- Snoopy's GPS Guided Trans-Atlantic Robot Boat
- Team Joker
- Autonomous
- Åland University Sailing Robots
- University of Ljubljana Microtransat Challenge
