= Candler, North Carolina =

Unincorporated community in North Carolina, US

Aerial view of Candler

Candler is an unincorporated community in Buncombe County, North Carolina, United States. It lies in the Hominy Valley west of Asheville and is part of the Asheville metropolitan area. The community is named for George Candler, an early settler.

== Geography ==
Candler is in southwestern Buncombe County, where Hominy Creek and South Hominy Creek meet. It lies on North Carolina Highway 151 and U.S. Routes 19, 23, and 74 Business, at an elevation of 2,122.7 feet (647 m). The ZIP code is 28715.

The community lies in the Hominy Valley, about halfway between downtown Asheville to the east and downtown Canton to the west. Mount Pisgah, with access to the Blue Ridge Parkway, stands to the south. NC 151 runs from Candler up to the Parkway.

== History ==
Candler takes its name from George Candler, an early settler. In the 1890s, Russell Jones Gaston ran a large store and a mill on Hominy Creek there, and Candler was hit hard by a flood in 1893.

By the early 1940s the community had its own high school, Candler High School. Candler has been described as a historic mill town. The American Enka Company in neighboring Enka, incorporated in 1928, was the nation's largest rayon producer and at one time employed more than 3,000 workers. The company's clock tower was preserved after residents campaigned to save it when an Amazon warehouse was planned for the site.

== Demographics ==
Candler is not a census-designated place, so the census does not count its population separately. The 28715 ZIP Code Tabulation Area, which covers the community, had an estimated population of 30,328 in the 2020–2024 American Community Survey.

== Education ==
Candler is served by Buncombe County Schools. Schools with Candler addresses include Candler Elementary, Hominy Valley Elementary, Pisgah Elementary, Enka Intermediate, Enka Middle School and Enka High School.
