= Hominy Valley =

- Location within North Carolina

Geography
- Country: United States
- State: North Carolina
- District: Buncombe County
- Coordinates: 35.5435068°N 82.6395619°W
- Interactive map of Hominy Valley

Hominy Valley is an area in Western North Carolina in the United States that includes the townships of Upper Hominy and Lower Hominy. The valley sits west of the French Broad River and Asheville. It is made up of the land surrounding the headstreams of Hominy Creek.

== History ==
The name of the valley and creek likely came from the word "hominy", which was derived from the indigenous word for hulled and dried corn. The Cherokee people lived in the valley for hundreds of years. They farmed in the area, and used a trail through the valley to travel. In 1763, King George III declared that the land west of the Blue Ridge Mountains was for the Cherokee. White settlers largely did not move into the area around this time because settlement and land grants of the area were prohibited.

Around 1776, the Cherokee were pushed out of Hominy Valley by General Griffith Rutherford and Captain William Moore, who killed and led attacks against the area's inhabitants during the American Revolutionary War. After the war ended, Moore received the first land grant in the area, paying 45 pounds for 450 acres. The grant was officially signed in 1787 and included the land around Hominy Creek. Moore became one of the first white settlers in the valley. He built a number of buildings in the area, including houses, the Sand Hill Academy, and a fort, none of which are still standing. Blockhouses were built along the sides of Hominy Valley in all four cardinal directions as fortification against the Cherokee. Made of log, these two-story houses included windows for muskets.

By 1884, the valley included three settlements: Harkins (1883–1887), which was renamed Acton in 1887, Hominy Creek (1875–circa 1903), and Turnpike. Later communities in the area included Beaverdam, Bear Creek, Bent Creek, Candler (also known as Candler Town), Candler Springs, Coburn, Dunsmore, Enka, Glady, Inanda, Jugtown, Luther, Owltown, Pole Creek, Sand Hill, Scratch Ankle, Starnes Cove, Stony Fork, and Vernon.

In 1929, the American Enka Company established itself in Hominy Valley. A Dutch rayon manufacturer, the company bought 2200 acres of farmland in the valley, and built multiple factory buildings and housing for workers, creating a mill and small village. They hired thousands of workers from the area during the Great Depression and became the largest Rayon factory in the United States.

In 1940, Hominy Valley had its highest flood in 100 years, with 12 inches of rainfall over the course of 24 hours hitting the valley. In 1977, the valley flooded again, with Hominy Creek reaching a height of 3 feet.

== Geography ==
The valley includes low terrain and rolling hills. It was used as agricultural lands, with the valley being fertile but not useful for planting cotton.
