= Hominy Creek =

Hominy Creek may refer to:

- Hominy Creek (Georgia), a stream in Georgia
- Hominy Creek (North Carolina), a stream in North Carolina
- Hominy Creek (Pomme de Terre River), a stream in Missouri
- Hominy Creek (West Virginia), a stream in West Virginia
