= Eddie McGill =

American football player (born 1960)

No. 87
- Position: Tight end

Personal information
- Born: July 5, 1960 (age 66); Asheville, North Carolina, U.S.
- Listed height: 6 ft 6 in (1.98 m)
- Listed weight: 225 lb (102 kg)

Career information
- High school: Enka (Candler, North Carolina)
- College: Western Carolina
- NFL draft: 1982: 10th round, 259th overall pick

Career history
- St. Louis Cardinals (1982–1983); Buffalo Bills (1985)*
- * Offseason or practice squad member only

Career NFL statistics
- Receptions: 1
- Receiving yards: 11
- Stats at Pro Football Reference

Eddie McGill (born July 5, 1960) is an American former professional football player who was a tight end for the St. Louis Cardinals of the National Football League (NFL) from 1982 to 1983. He played college football for the Western Carolina Catamounts.
