= Enka High School =

American public school in North Carolina

Location
- 475 Enka Lake Road; Candler, North Carolina 28715; United States; 35°33′08″N 82°39′51″W

Information
- Type: Public
- Established: 1955 (71 years ago)
- School district: Buncombe County Schools
- CEEB code: 341215
- Principal: Katie Harris
- Staff: 63.74 (FTE)
- Grades: 9–12
- Enrollment: 1,051 (2024-2025)
- Student to teacher ratio: 16.49
- Colors: Navy and White
- Team name: Jets
- Website: ehs.buncombeschools.org

Enka High School is a public high school in Candler, North Carolina. It is a part of the Buncombe County Schools district.

== History ==
Enka High School was established in 1955. The school is named after the Enka community in Buncombe County, which takes its name from the Dutch pronunciation of the letters N and K, the initials of the parent company of the American Enka Company.

== Band ==
Enka's marching band, the Marching Jets, has had four directors since the program began in 1955. The school hosts the annual Land of the Sky Marching Band Festival, first held in 1975 with four competing bands. By its 50th edition in 2024, the festival had grown to 30 competing bands, and the 2023 festival drew more than 5,000 spectators. The 2024 festival was postponed from September 28 to November 2 because of Hurricane Helene.

== Athletics ==
Enka is a member of the North Carolina High School Athletic Association (NCHSAA). The school colors are navy and white, and its team name is the Jets. Listed below are the different sport teams at Enka:

- Baseball
- Basketball
- Cross Country
- Football
- Golf
- Soccer
- Softball
- Swimming
- Tennis
- Track & Field
- Volleyball
- Wrestling

=== Softball ===
The softball team, known as the Sugar Jets, won four NCHSAA state championships: 3A titles in 1996, 2015, and 2016. The 2015 team finished 28-0, was named MaxPreps Medium Schools Team of the Year, and ranked 22nd in the final MaxPreps national rankings. Jennifer Kruk, a 1996 Enka graduate, coached the team for 17 seasons and was named North Carolina Coach of the year in 2016. In 2026, under head coach Todd Coggins, Enka defeated West Carteret in two games (11-5 and 4-0) to win the NCHSAA 5A state championship. Savannah Frisbee was named the series' Most Valuable Player.

=== Wrestling ===
Under coach Mark Harris, the wrestling team won its first state championship in 2016, by winning the NCHSAA 3A individual state championship. The wrestling team also had a run of 14 consecutive conference championships. In 2020, the team won the NCHSAA 3A individual state championship and finished second in the 3A dual team state championship. In 2026, Enka wrestling won the NCHSAA 5A men's individual state championship.

== Notable alumni ==
- Charles Robin Britt, lawyer and politician
- Evan Golden, professional wrestler
- Kelly Grieve, softball player
- Larry McCall, former MLB pitcher
- Eddie McGill, former NFL tight end
- Coleman Pressley, NASCAR spotter for Joey Logano and the Team Penske No. 22.
- Robert Pressley, former NASCAR driver in all three major NASCAR series, and Buncombe County, North Carolina county commissioner
- Jerry Reed, former MLB pitcher
- David B. Sentelle, Senior United States circuit judge of the United States Court of Appeals for the District of Columbia Circuit
