= North Carolina Highway 151 =

State highway in Buncombe County, North Carolina, US

North Carolina Highway 151
- Pisgah Highway

Route information
- Maintained by NCDOT
- Length: 11.83 mi (19.04 km)
- Existed: 1963–present

Major junctions
- South end: Blue Ridge Parkway near Mount Pisgah
- North end: US 19 / US 23 in Enka

Location
- Country: United States
- State: North Carolina
- Counties: Buncombe

Highway system
- North Carolina Highway System; Interstate; US; State; Scenic
← NC 150	→ NC 152

North Carolina Highway 151 (NC 151) is a north-south state highway located in western Buncombe County. NC 151 provides a direct access to the Blue Ridge Parkway from the west side of the Asheville vicinity.

== Route description ==
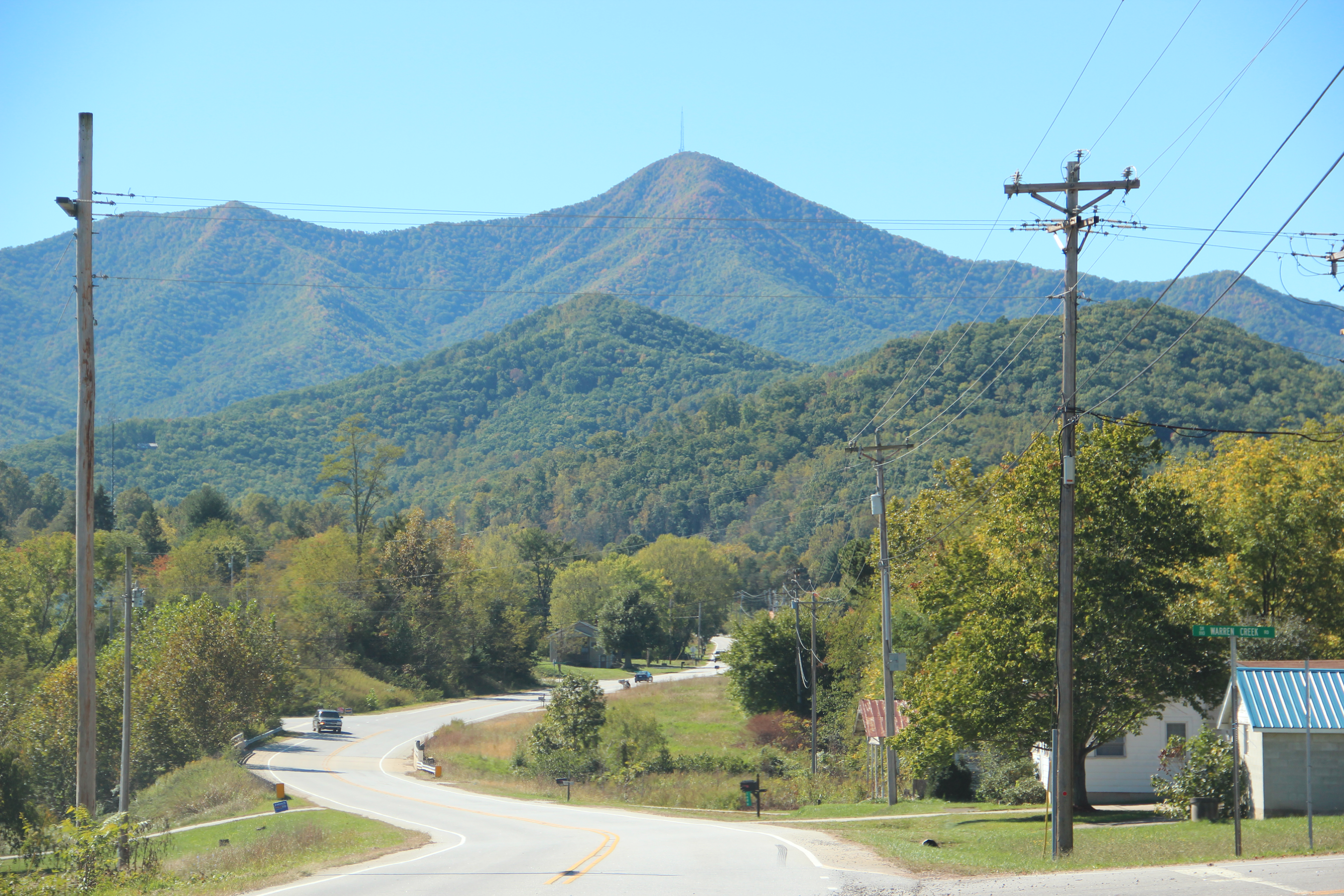
NC 151 with Mount Pisgah in the background

NC 151 has its southern end at the Blue Ridge Parkway near Mount Pisgah and briefly parallels the parkway for the first two miles (3.2 km) before turning west. Shortly after, NC 151 turns back north. NC 151 travels north, passing through Stony Fork then South Hominy as it turns northeast. NC 151 also passes through Glady before reaching the unincorporated community of Candler as it nears its end. At 11.83 miles (19.04 km), NC 151 reaches its northern terminus at U.S. Route 19 (US 19) and US 23 (Smokey Park Highway) in Enka.

== History ==
The NC 151 designation first appeared in 1925 as a highway running from NC 15 (present-day Cabarrus Avenue) in Concord, southeast to NC 20 (present-day Charlotte Avenue) near Monroe and was later extended through Monroe with US 74/NC 20 and southeast to the South Carolina state line. However, around 1951, NC 151 was renumbered as US 601.

The current routing of NC 151 emerged in 1963 as a renumbering of the western part of NC 112.

== Major intersections ==
The entire route is in Buncombe County.

Location	mi	km	Destinations	Notes
	0.00	0.00	Blue Ridge Parkway	
Enka	11.83	19.04	US 19 / US 23 – Asheville, Canton	
1.000 mi = 1.609 km; 1.000 km = 0.621 mi
