= Lowland, Tennessee =

Lowland
- Unincorporated community
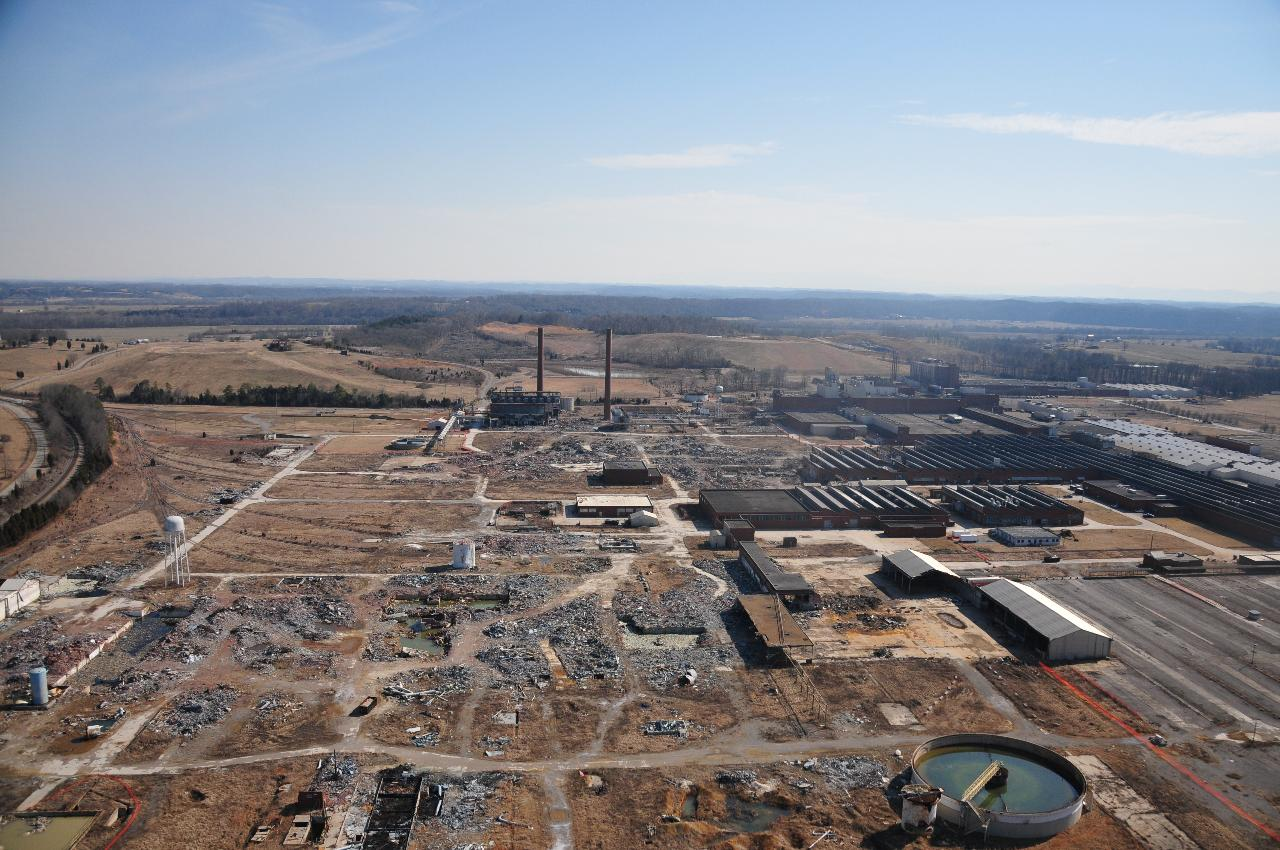
- Site of former Liberty Fibers/Enka/BASF plant in Lowland

- Location within Tennessee Location within the United States
- Coordinates: 36°09′29″N 83°12′30″W
- Country: United States
- State: Tennessee
- County: Hamblen
- Named for: American Enka Company Lowland factory
- Elevation: 1,050 ft (320 m)
- Time zone: UTC-5 (Eastern (EST))
  - Summer (DST): UTC-4 (EDT)
- ZIP code: 37813
- Area code: 423
- GNIS feature ID: 1292236

Lowland is an unincorporated community in Hamblen County, Tennessee.

== History ==
Lowland has historically been the site of many synthetic fiber plants; the American Enka Company, BASF, and Liberty Fibers once operated on the same plant site in the community.

== Geography ==
Lowland is located near Tennessee State Route 160, Interstate 81 and the Norfolk Southern Railway 6.2 miles (10.0 km) southeast of Morristown.

Lowland had a post office from February 1, 1949, to June 11, 2011; it still has its own ZIP code, 37778.

The former industrial site of the Liberty Fibers/Enka/BASF plant and its adjacent wastewater treatment plant have since been annexed into the City of Morristown.

== Historic sites ==
The properties of Rural Mount and St. Paul Presbyterian Church in Lowland are both listed on the National Register of Historic Places.
