= Senator Outlaw =

Senator Outlaw may refer to:

- Alexander Outlaw (1738–1826), Tennessee State Senate
- George Outlaw (1771–1825), North Carolina State Senate
