= Martese Jackson =

American gridiron football player (born 1992)

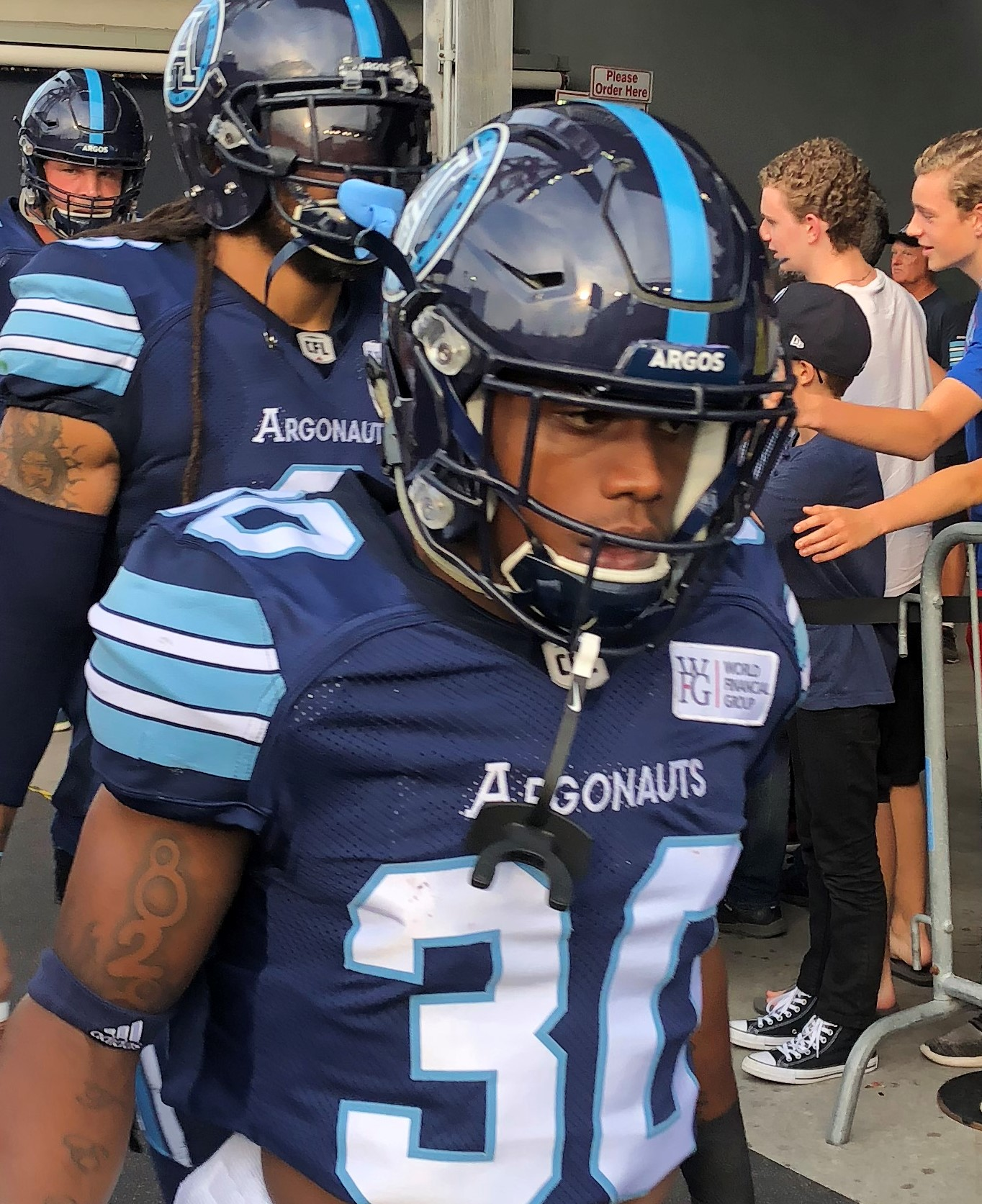
- Jackson with the Toronto Argonauts in 2018

No. 30
- Positions: Running back, Kick returner

Personal information
- Born: May 20, 1992 (age 34); Asheville, North Carolina, U.S.
- Listed height: 5 ft 5 in (1.65 m)
- Listed weight: 171 lb (78 kg)

Career information
- High school: Clyde A. Erwin (Asheville)
- College: Florida Atlantic

Career history
- 2015: Winnipeg Blue Bombers*
- 2015–2016: Montreal Alouettes*
- 2017–2018: Toronto Argonauts
- 2018–2019: Edmonton Eskimos
- 2021: Montreal Alouettes
- 2022: Edmonton Elks
- * Offseason or practice squad member only

Awards and highlights
- Grey Cup champion (2017)

Career CFL statistics
- Punt returns: 179
- Punt return yards: 1,908
- Kick returns: 129
- Kick return yards: 2,569
- Total return TD: 3
- Stats at CFL.ca

Martese Jackson (born May 20, 1992) is an American former professional football running back and kick returner who played in the Canadian Football League (CFL). He played college football at Florida Atlantic University.

== College career ==
After transferring from Fort Scott Community College, Jackson played 3 seasons with the Florida Atlantic Owls football team, where he amassed 240 rushing yards and 1 touchdown, while also 392 yards on 22 carries.

== Professional career ==
=== Winnipeg Blue Bombers ===
Jackson signed with the Winnipeg Blue Bombers on February 24, 2015, but was released before training camp on April 13, 2015.

=== Montreal Alouettes (first stint) ===
Jackson then signed with the Montreal Alouettes on June 10, 2015, and spent the season on the practice roster. He again spent the 2016 season on the practice roster before being released before the 2017 season on May 1, 2017.

=== Toronto Argonauts ===
On May 2, 2017, Jackson signed with the Toronto Argonauts as a free agent. He made the team out of training camp and played in his first game on June 30, 2017. He was named a CFL Top Performer for Week 4 after gaining 339 total return yards in a single game, the fourth-most in CFL history. Overall, he played in 15 regular season games and both playoff games, including the Argonauts' 105th Grey Cup victory over the Calgary Stampeders. In the 15 games he finished with 2,214 kick return yards, 1,133 yards on 52 kickoff returns, 824 yards and two touchdowns on 70 punt returns and 256 yards and one touchdown on four missed field goals.

=== Edmonton Eskimos (first stint) ===
On September 10, 2018, the Argonauts traded Jackson to the Edmonton Eskimos along with a conditional 2020 sixth round draft pick in exchange for a 2019 third round draft pick. Jackson provided a spark on special teams, while also contributing as a change of pace back in six games with Edmonton; Jackson rushed three times for 25 yards, and his first career rushing touchdown, in addition to catching seven passes for 68 yards. Jackson became a free agent, but signed back with Edmonton on May 20, 2019. Jackson went down with injury after six games played, but put up a combined 46 punt and kick returns for 595 yards, improving on his averages with Edmonton from the previous season.

=== Montreal Alouettes (second stint) ===
On October 25, 2021, it was announced that Jackson had signed with the Alouettes.

=== Edmonton Elks (second stint) ===
The Elks announced that they had traded for Jackson on January 14, 2022. He was released on June 21, 2022.
