= Robbie Nallenweg =

American football player (born 1991)

Robbie Nalleweg
Profile
- Position: Quarterback

Personal information
- Born: May 30, 1991 (age 35); Asheville, North Carolina, U.S.
- Listed height: 6 ft 4 in (1.93 m)
- Listed weight: 220 lb (100 kg)

Career information
- High school: Clyde A. Erwin (Asheville, North Carolina)
- College: Wingate
- NFL draft: 2013: undrafted

Career history
- West Texas Wildcatters (2014); Salina Bombers (2014); Green Bay Blizzard (2014); Iowa Barnstormers (2015)

Robbie Nallenweg (born May 30, 1991) is an American former football quarterback. He played college football at Wingate University. He was signed as an undrafted free agent by the West Texas Wildcatters. During the 2014 season, Nallenweg also played for the Salina Bombers and the Green Bay Blizzard.

Nallenweg played college football at Wingate University, where he had a breakout season in 2012, setting many school records. He set Wingate school records for passing yards per game (331.3), completions in a game (43), completions in a season (326), attempts in a season (491) and completion percentage for a season (66 percent). His yards in a season (3,644) and touchdowns in a season (29) were both second-most for a quarterback at Wingate.
