= Clyde A. Erwin High School =

American public school in North Carolina

Location
- 60 Lees Creek Road; Asheville, North Carolina 28806; United States; 35°37′09″N 82°37′35″W

Information
- Type: Public
- Established: 1955 (71 years ago)
- School district: Buncombe County Schools
- CEEB code: 340130
- Principal: Stanley Wheless
- Teaching staff: 70.81 (FTE)
- Grades: 9–12
- Enrollment: 1,052 (2023–2024)
- Student to teacher ratio: 14.86
- Colors: Red and white
- Team name: Warriors
- Website: caehs.buncombeschools.org

Clyde A. Erwin High School is a public high school in Asheville, North Carolina, United States. The enrollment in 2023–24 was 1,052 students in grades 9–12. When Principal Chip Cody was promoted to Assistant Superintendent, Stanley Wheless became principal in school year 2025-2026.

== History ==
Erwin High School opened in 1955 as one of six high schools built in Buncombe County between 1954 and 1962. The current building was constructed in 1973 next to the original school, which now serves as Erwin Middle School. The school was named after Clyde Atkinson Erwin (1897–1952), who served as North Carolina State Superintendent of Public Instruction from 1934 to 1952.

== Mascot ==
The school's mascot is the Warriors / Lady Warriors. In early 1999, the civil rights division of the United States Department of Justice evaluated whether the school district had discriminated against Native American students, after parents filed a complaint when school officials declined to change the names of the school's teams, then the Warriors and the "Squaws". The complaint also cited taunts at sporting events and students' use of eagle feathers and drums at football games. It was the department's first investigation into a school's use of Native American mascots.

The department closed its investigation in March 1999 after the Buncombe County school board agreed to replace the girls' team name at the end of the school year. The boys' teams remained the Warriors, and the school kept its Indian-themed items, including two totem poles and a 30-foot statue of a warrior. The board also agreed to consider recommendations from local Cherokee tribe members about objects or symbols they considered disrespectful. Students selected "Lady Warriors" as the new name. The dispute drew national media attention.

== Athletics ==
Erwin is a member of the North Carolina High School Athletic Association (NCHSAA). The school's basketball program produced a state runner-up team in 1957 and a state championship team in 1980. In 2024, the football team won its conference title, its first conference championship since 2000, finishing the regular season 8–1.

== Notable alumni ==
- Martese Jackson, Canadian Football League player
- Caleb Johnson, winner of the thirteenth season of American Idol
- Loyd King, professional basketball player
- Rashad McCants, NBA player and 2005 NCAA champion with North Carolina
- Robbie Nallenweg, former Indoor Football League quarterback
