= Mount Pisgah (mountain in North Carolina) =

Mountain in North Carolina, United States

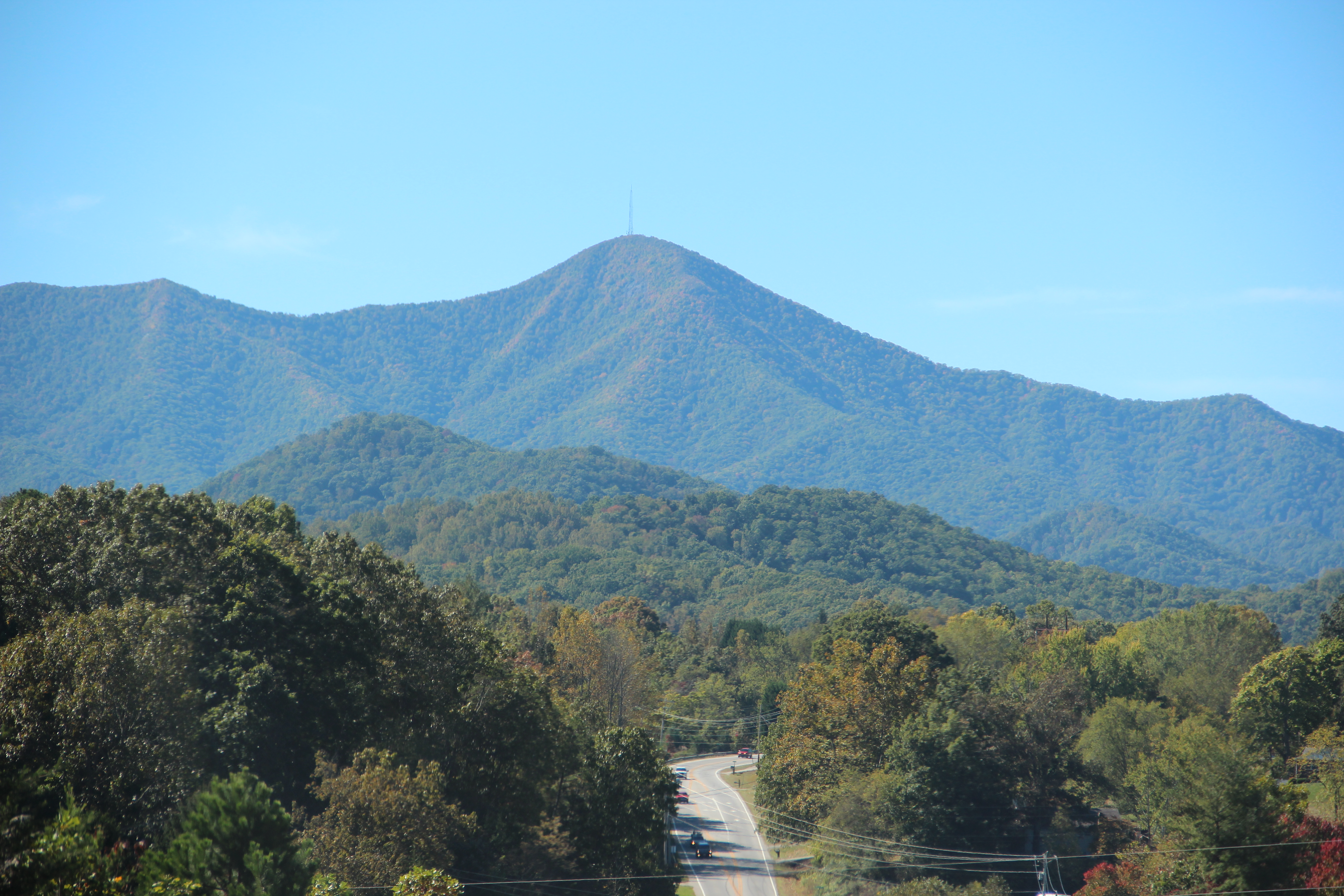
- Viewed from North Carolina Highway 151

Highest point
- Elevation: 5,721 ft (1,744 m)
- Coordinates: 35.4255°N 82.7569°W

Geography
- Location: Buncombe / Haywood counties, North Carolina, U.S.
- Parent range: Appalachian Mountains
- Topo map: USGS Cruso

Climbing
- Easiest route: Hike

Mount Pisgah is a mountain in the Appalachian mountain range and part of the Blue Ridge Mountains of North Carolina, United States. The mountain's height is 5,721 feet (1,744 m) above sea level, and it sits approximately 15 miles (24 kilometers) southwest of Asheville, near the crossing of the boundaries of Buncombe, Haywood, Henderson and Transylvania counties. It is located on the border of Buncombe and Haywood counties, close to the point where Henderson and Transylvania meet them, but not actually within the latter two counties. The mountain is easily accessible via a hiking trail from the Blue Ridge Parkway, near the Pisgah Inn.

Some people in the area have referred to "Pisgah and the Rat" because the mountain and others nearby are said to look like a rat. Art by Harry Sage appears on the city seal of Asheville, North Carolina.

== Broadcasting controversy ==
The prominent tower in the picture at the crest of Mount Pisgah, on what is known as Pisgah Ledge, is a 339-foot-tall (103 m) television broadcast tower owned by Chesapeake Television, Incorporated, doing business as the Sinclair Broadcast Group, licensee of WLOS TV 13.x, transmitting on VHF channel 13, from nearby Asheville, North Carolina. It is the highest television antenna east of the Mississippi River, at 2,814 feet (858 m) above the surrounding valley floor, and 6,023 feet (1,836 m) above mean sea level, according to the Federal Communications Commission. Co-located on the tower is WUNF-TV 33.x on UHF channel 25, WKSF FM 99.9, WXL56 on 162.400 MHz from the Greenville/Spartanburg office of the National Weather Service, and ham radio vhf (146.760 N2GE). From this location, the stations cover the western Carolinas media market. Due to the terrain shielding of the surrounding mountains, and the much lower and flatter Piedmont (and therefore much greater height above average terrain) toward the southeast, the stations actually cover much more of South Carolina than they do North Carolina.

On May 22, 2001, the United States Forest Service decided to allow WLOS TV to build a replacement television transmission tower on top of Mount Pisgah. The new tower would have been a lighter-weight tower to support the station's digital TV antenna that would have replaced the heavier channel 13 analog antenna, fulfilling the government-ordered transfer to digital transmission. The old tower would not have supported both the heavy analog antenna, plus the added weight of a full power digital antenna. The Blue Ridge Parkway and several conservation organizations had opposed building a new tower on the peak located adjacent to the Parkway and repeatedly requested the Forest Service explore alternative locations. In 2009, the controversy was resolved, with the FCC and the U.S. Department of the Interior allowing WLOS to maintain its old tower on the summit after the analog antenna was removed, and the station to make needed adjustments to its digital antennas now mounted on the tower.

== Recreation ==
The trail leading to the summit of Mt. Pisgah starts at milepost 407 of the Blue Ridge Parkway on the west side of the road at an overlook labeled "Mt. Pisgah Parking". The trail is 1.6 miles long and is of moderate difficulty (sections near the summit can be rather steep). There is a small observation deck near the TV tower at the summit.

Leading up the mountain from the valley floor, is a still-operating cable car that is used to ferry broadcasting equipment to the building. The cable car also ferries engineers during bad weather, for mandatory transmitter work.

Also at the Mt. Pisgah Parking area is the Buck Spring trailhead. A short walk down the Buck Spring Trail brings visitors to a historic exhibit located at the foundation stone remains of the George Vanderbilt hunting lodge.

On the east side of the Parkway at milepost 407 is the Mt. Pisgah Picnic Area. The picnic area includes grills, tables and restroom facilities. All are ADA/handicapped accessible.

The Pisgah Inn Lodge Restaurant and Country Store, as well as the Mt. Pisgah Campground is located at milepost 408 of the Blue Ridge Parkway. Several other trails can be accessed from the campground or the Inn.

== Gallery ==
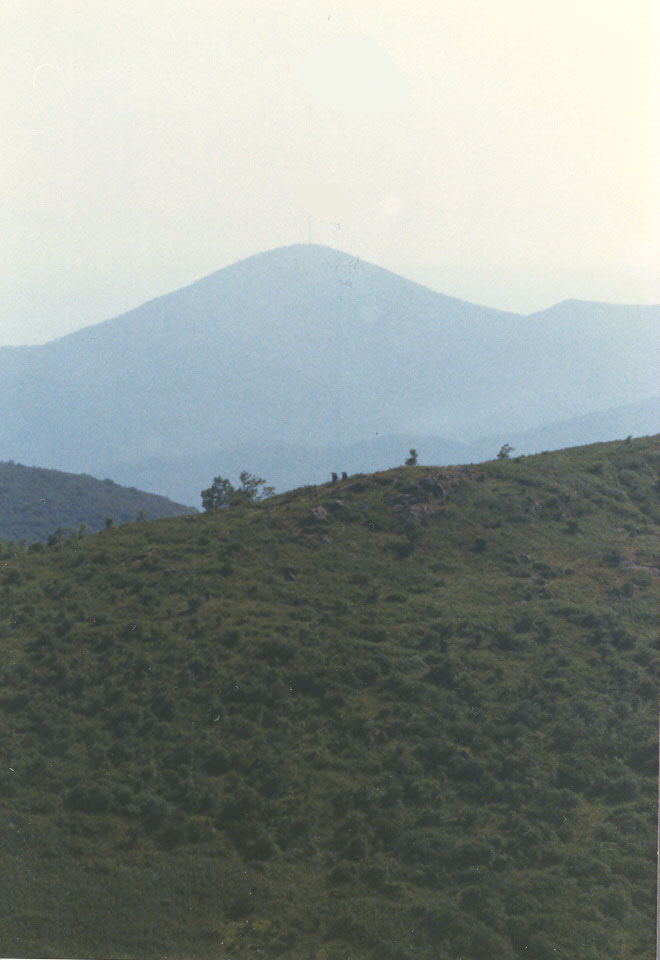
View from Black Balsam Knob, 9.5 miles distant

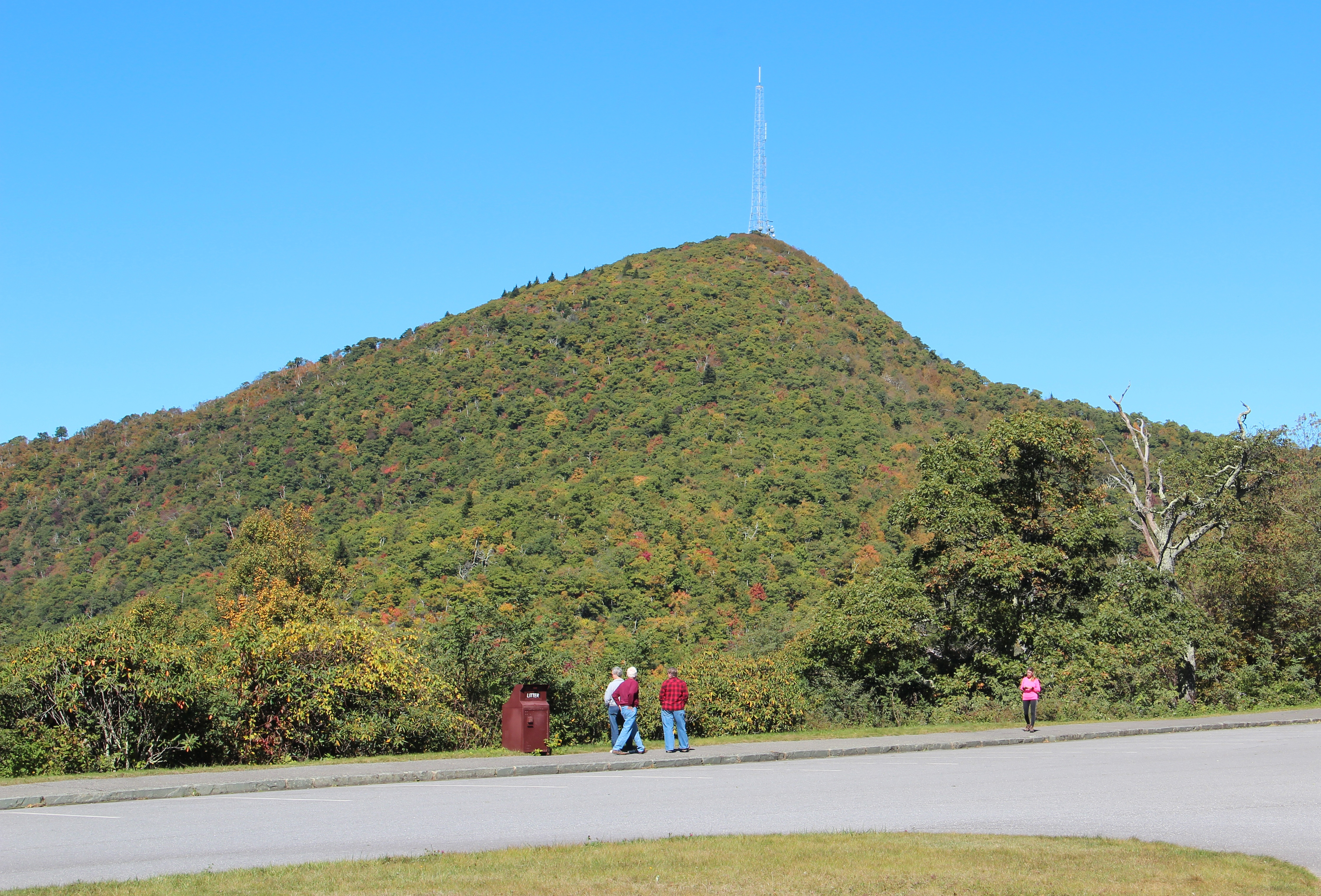
The summit of Mount Pisgah viewed from the Blue Ridge Parkway

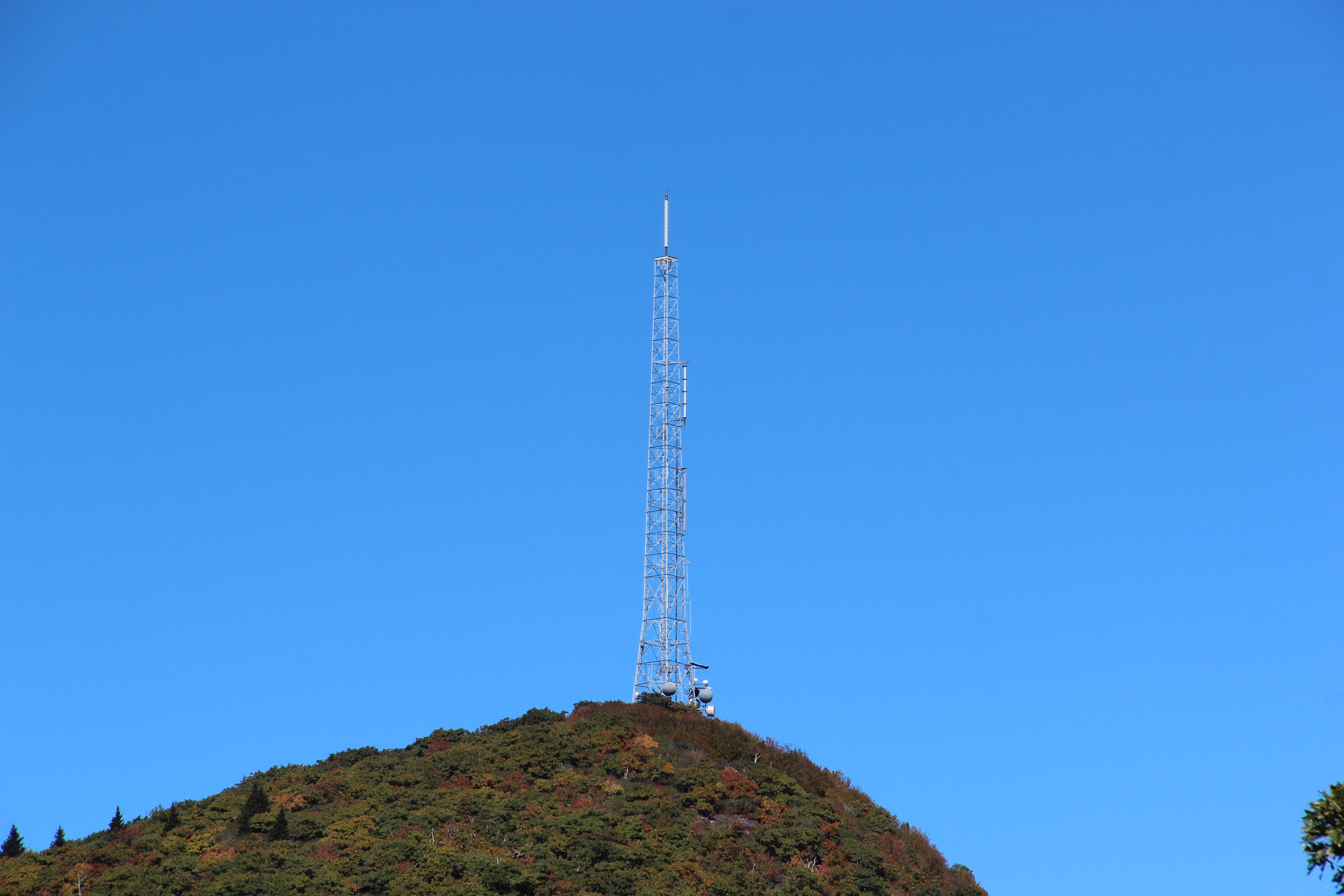
Mount Pisgah summit, with broadcast tower

== See also ==
- List of mountains in North Carolina
