= Kelly Grieve =

American softball player

Personal information
- Full name: Kelly Elaine Grieve
- Born: May 10, 1989 (age 37) Asheville, North Carolina, U.S.
- Height: 5 ft 4 in (163 cm)

Sport
- Country: USA
- Sport: Softball
- College team: Tennessee Volunteers
Medal record
Women's softball
Representing United States
Pan American Games
Gold medal – first place	2011 Guadalajara	Team

Kelly Elaine Grieve (born May 10, 1989) is an American softball player. She attended Enka High School and University of Tennessee. She played as an outfielder. With United States women's national softball team she won the 2011 World Cup of Softball.
