= St. Paul Presbyterian Church (Lowland, Tennessee) =

Historic church in Tennessee, United States

- U.S. National Register of Historic Places
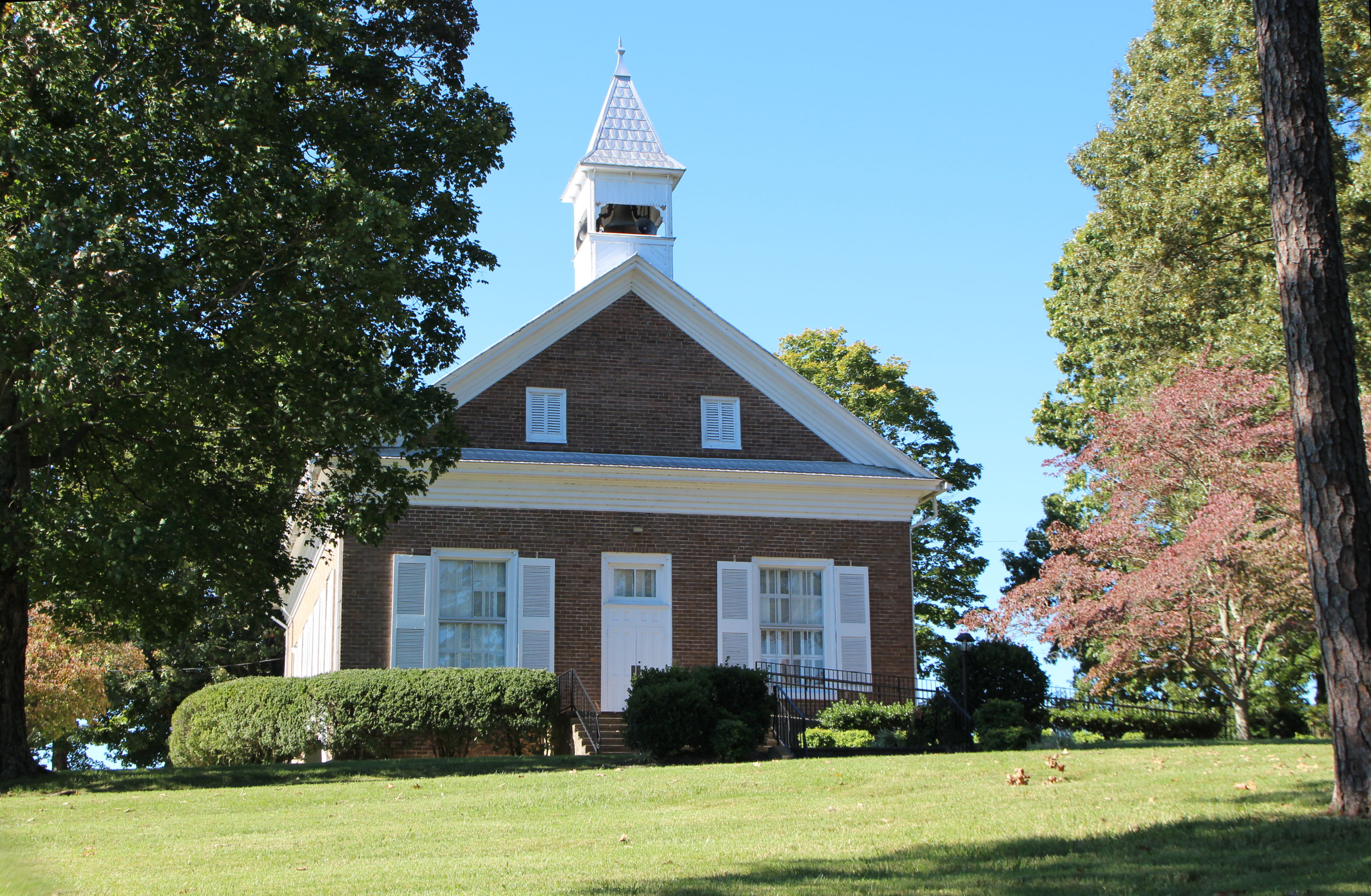

- Location within Tennessee Location within the United States
- Nearest city: Lowland, Tennessee
- Coordinates: 36°9′42″N 83°13′33″W
- Area: 15 acres (6.1 ha)
- Built: 1857
- Architect: Seabolt, John
- Architectural style: Greek Revival
- NRHP reference No.: 79002434
- Added to NRHP: August 10, 1979

St. Paul Presbyterian Church in Lowland, Tennessee, also known as St.Paul United Presbyterian Church, is a historic Presbyterian church. It was built in 1857 and added to the National Register of Historic Places in 1979.

It is built of brick laid in stretcher bond, on a brick foundation.

It was deemed notable as "an excellent example of the Greek Revival style church built in rural East Tennessee in the 1840s and 1850s. Since small congregations had limited funds available for new buildings, they interpreted the temple form without the columned porticos, that is, in the unadorned form which is characterized by St. Paul Presbyterian Church. It has been hypothesized that nineteenth-century Tennessee Presbyterians preferred the Greek Revival style for their churches, while Episcopalians in the same region favored the Gothic Revival style. St. Paul's adds evidence to this hypothesis."

The property also includes a non-contributing brick-veneered, concrete block residence (ca.1960) which was moved to the property by 1979.
