= Rashad McCants =

American basketball player (born 1984)

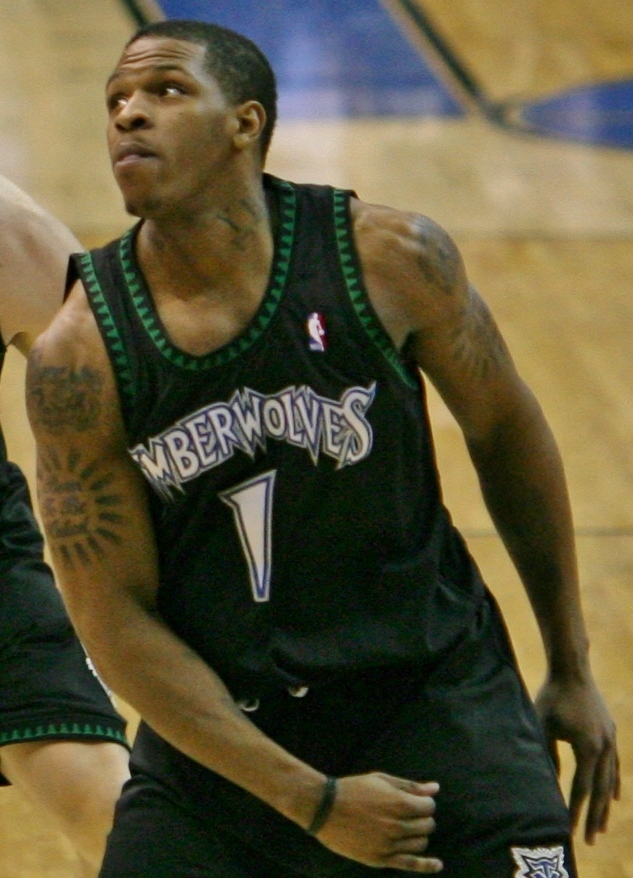
- McCants with the Minnesota Timberwolves in 2007

Personal information
- Born: September 25, 1984 (age 42) Asheville, North Carolina, U.S.
- Listed height: 6 ft 4 in (1.93 m)
- Listed weight: 207 lb (94 kg)

Career information
- High school: Clyde A. Erwin (Asheville, North Carolina); New Hampton School (New Hampton, New Hampshire)
- College: North Carolina (2002–2005)
- NBA draft: 2005: 1st round, 14th overall pick
- Drafted by: Minnesota Timberwolves
- Playing career: 2005–2018
- Position: Shooting guard
- Number: 1, 7

Career history
- 2005–2009: Minnesota Timberwolves
- 2009: Sacramento Kings
- 2010–2011: Texas Legends
- 2012: Caciques de Humacao
- 2012: Piratas de Quebradillas
- 2012: Powerade Tigers
- 2012–2013: Foshan Long Lions
- 2013: Texas Legends
- 2014: Uberlândia
- 2014–2015: Homenetmen Beirut
- 2015: Trotamundos de Carabobo
- 2015: Cañeros de La Romana
- 2017–2018: Club Antonin Sportif

Career highlights
- BIG 3 Champion (2017); NCAA champion (2005); Third-team All-American – NABC (2005); Third-team All-American – AP, SN (2004); First-team All-ACC (2004); Third-team All-ACC (2005); ACC All-Freshman Team (2003); McDonald's All-American (2002); First-team Parade All-American (2002); Fourth-team Parade All-American (2001)
- Stats at NBA.com
- Stats at Basketball Reference

Rashad Dion McCants (born September 25, 1984) is an American former professional basketball player who has played in the National Basketball Association (NBA) as well as overseas. He played college basketball for the North Carolina Tar Heels, winning a national championship in his junior season. He was formerly part of the cast for Gilbert Arenas' podcast titled "The Arena" alongside Lexie Brown, Brandon Jennings, Kenyon Martin, and Nick Young.

== High school career ==
McCants began his high school career at Clyde A. Erwin High School in Asheville, North Carolina, and finished at New Hampton School in New Hampton, New Hampshire. He led New Hampton to the 2002 New England Prep School Class A championship and was named MVP of the title game. McCants played alongside future college teammate Wes Miller during his senior season.

McCants was an honor roll student at New Hampton. He also won the New Hampshire Player of the Year Award in 2001 and 2002. And, as a senior, he was also named to the Parade All-American and McDonald's All-American Teams. He played in the McDonald's All-American Game with future Tar Heel teammates Raymond Felton and Sean May.

College recruiting
Name	Hometown	School	Height	Weight	Commit date
Rashad McCants; SG, SF	Asheville, NC	New Hampton School	6 ft 5 in (1.96 m)	200 lb (91 kg)	
Rashad McCants; SG, SF	Recruit ratings: Scout: Rivals:				
Overall recruit ranking: Scout: 1 (SG) Rivals: 4 (SF)
Note: In many cases, Scout, Rivals, 247Sports, On3, and ESPN may conflict in their listings of height and weight.; In these cases, the average was taken. ESPN grades are on a 100-point scale.; Sources: "2002 North Carolina Basketball Commitment List". Rivals.; "2002 North Carolina College Basketball Recruiting Commits". Scout.; "Scout.com Team Recruiting Rankings". Scout.; "2002 Team Ranking". Rivals.

== College career ==
Alongside Sean May, Raymond Felton, and David Noel, McCants joined a stellar recruiting class at UNC for the 2002–2003 season, coached by Matt Doherty. In his freshman year, McCants led the Tar Heels in scoring with 17.5 points per game, and led them to a third round loss to Georgetown in the National Invitational Tournament. He was voted to the All-Atlantic Coast Conference (ACC) rookie team.

In the 2003–2004 season, McCants led the ACC in scoring with 20 points per game. With that effort, McCants helped lead UNC back into the NCAA Tournament with a sixth seed, where they lost in the second round to number three seeded Texas. He was the leading vote-getter on the All-ACC First Team as a sophomore, and was named a third-team All-American.

With freshman Marvin Williams joining the squad for the 2004–2005 season, the junior class led by preseason Wooden Award candidates in McCants, May, and Felton gave UNC a high ranking in all preseason polls and the team was seen as one of the favorites to win the NCAA Tournament. After going 33–4 and winning the ACC regular season, McCants' 16.4 points per game helped secure UNC one of the four number one seeds in the NCAA Tournament. UNC cruised to the championship game, where McCants helped the Tar Heels defeat the Illinois Fighting Illini, 75–70.

McCants' three years at Chapel Hill were not without controversy. In an interview with local television station WRAL, McCants compared UNC to a prison, stating, "You're not allowed to say certain things, but once you get out of jail, you're free. (I'm) in my sentence, and I'm doing my time."

McCants scored 1,721 points and made 221 three-pointers during his career at North Carolina.

== Professional career ==
After winning the championship, McCants declared his eligibility for the 2005 NBA draft, and was selected 14th overall by the Minnesota Timberwolves. His college teammates, Marvin Williams, Raymond Felton, and Sean May were also selected in the draft. During his first two years as a pro, McCants was bothered by injuries and did not play up to the expectations of fans. He had a lot of expectations going into the 2007–08 season, and on a young Timberwolves squad, he started the season as a rotation regular, and broke into the starting lineup halfway through the season.

As of January 2008, Rashad had posted career-highs through his third season, with 34 points against the Denver Nuggets on January 4, 2008, 8 rebounds against the Miami Heat on January 8, 4 steals against the Seattle SuperSonics on December 29, 2007, and getting 6 assists five times. On December 26, 2008, he hit a career-high 7 three-pointers in a Wolves win over the New York Knicks.

On February 19, 2009, McCants was sent to the Sacramento Kings along with Calvin Booth for Shelden Williams and Bobby Brown. McCants then signed with the Houston Rockets in September 2009, but had his contract retracted on the second day of the training camp. The Rockets General Manager said McCants presented with an abdomen problem and would not be able to participate in the camp, though he also said he would still consider McCants down the track once healthy.

In the summer of 2010, he was scheduled to join the Cleveland Cavaliers' NBA Summer League team. However, he did not report to the team for personal reasons.

In October 2010 the Dallas Mavericks signed McCants to their training camp roster. However, he was released only after a few days. He was then signed by the Mavericks' NBA Development League associate, the Texas Legends.

In 2012, the Powerade Tigers of the Philippine Basketball Association acquired him as their import for the Governors Cup. However, despite playing his usual game, he was not able to help the Tigers win their first two games and was released afterwards.

On July 13, 2012, McCants signed with the French club Strasbourg IG. On August 24, 2012, he parted ways with Strasbourg before appearing in a game for them. On November 19, 2012, he signed with the Foshan Long Lions of China. On January 10, 2013, he was waived by the Foshan.

On January 24, 2013, McCants was acquired by the Texas Legends. He was waived by the Legends in February 2013. In November 2013, he was announced by the Brazilian club Uberlândia Tênis Clube for 2013–14 NBB season. He debuted on January 5, 2014, against São José Basketball.

On November 23, 2014, McCants signed with Homenetmen Beirut of the Lebanese Basketball League. In April 2015, he signed with Trotamundos de Carabobo of Venezuela for the rest of the 2015 LPB season.

== BIG3 ==
On April 30, 2017, McCants was selected as the No. 1 overall pick in the 2017 BIG3 Draft by Trilogy. On August 26, 2017, Trilogy won the first-ever Big3 League Championship. McCants scored 22 points on 55% shooting and was named Championship MVP.

== Personal life ==
McCants' sister, Rashanda McCants, also played for North Carolina and in the WNBA.

Rashad is the cousin of Major League Baseball player Cameron Maybin and third cousin of former Canadian Football League player John Avery.

In June 2008, McCants began dating reality television star Khloe Kardashian. The two were introduced by the National Football League player Reggie Bush who had been dating her sister Kim at the time. The relationship ended after seven months, in late January 2009, reportedly due to McCants's infidelity. He also made a brief guest appearance on her reality show, Keeping Up with the Kardashians, during season 3 (episode 7). Eight years later, speaking with a Charlotte Observer reporter while looking back on his career in the NBA, McCants stated that the highly publicized relationship with Khloe Kardashian was the "biggest regret" because it "gave people an opportunity to doubt his commitment to the NBA", adding: "Without that situation in play, I’m a $60-70 million player. Easily."

McCants was one of the victims of professional scam artist/fraudster Peggy Ann Fulford (Peggy King, Peggy Williams, Peggy Ann Barard, etc.), losing $200,000, amongst the $5.79 million in total she stole from him, Ricky Williams, Travis Best, Dennis Rodman, Lex Hilliard and others. Fulford, who was indicted by the FBI in December 2016, continued her criminal activity until sentenced in February 2018 to 10 years in prison and full financial restitution to her victims.

== Awards ==
- All-ACC First Team: 2003–04
- All-ACC Third Team: 2004–05
- All-ACC Rookie Team: 2002–03
- Parade All-American: 2001–02
- McDonald's All-American: 2001–02
- New Hampshire Player of the Year: 2000, 2001

== Career statistics ==
Legend
GP	Games played	GS	Games started	MPG	Minutes per game
FG%	Field goal percentage	3P%	3-point field goal percentage	FT%	Free throw percentage
RPG	Rebounds per game	APG	Assists per game	SPG	Steals per game
BPG	Blocks per game	PPG	Points per game	**Bold**	Career high

=== College ===
Year	Team	GP	GS	MPG	FG%	3P%	FT%	RPG	APG	SPG	BPG	PPG
2002–03	North Carolina	**35**	**31**	29.9	**.491**	.414	.697	**4.6**	1.5	1.4	.5	17.0
2003–04	North Carolina	30	29	**32.0**	.479	.408	**.748**	**4.6**	2.2	**1.8**	**.7**	**20.0**
2004–05	North Carolina	33	30	25.9	.489	**.423**	.722	3.0	**2.7**	1.3	**.7**	16.0
Career		98	90	29.2	.486	.415	.721	4.1	2.1	1.5	.6	17.6

=== NBA ===
==== Regular season ====
Year	Team	GP	GS	MPG	FG%	3P%	FT%	RPG	APG	SPG	BPG	PPG
2005–06	Minnesota	**79**	12	17.2	.450	.372	.736	1.8	.8	.6	**.3**	7.9
2006–07	Minnesota	37	0	15.0	.350	.267	.690	1.3	1.0	.7	.2	5.0
2007–08	Minnesota	75	**24**	**26.9**	**.453**	**.407**	.748	**2.7**	**2.2**	**.9**	.2	**14.9**
2008–09	Minnesota	34	2	18.7	.360	.319	.741	1.9	.9	.8	.2	9.1
2008–09	Sacramento	24	1	19.4	.444	.357	**.783**	2.0	1.5	.8	**.3**	10.3
Career		249	39	20.2	.431	.368	.741	2.0	1.3	.7	.9	10.0
