= Rural Mount =

Historic house in Tennessee, United States

- U.S. National Register of Historic Places
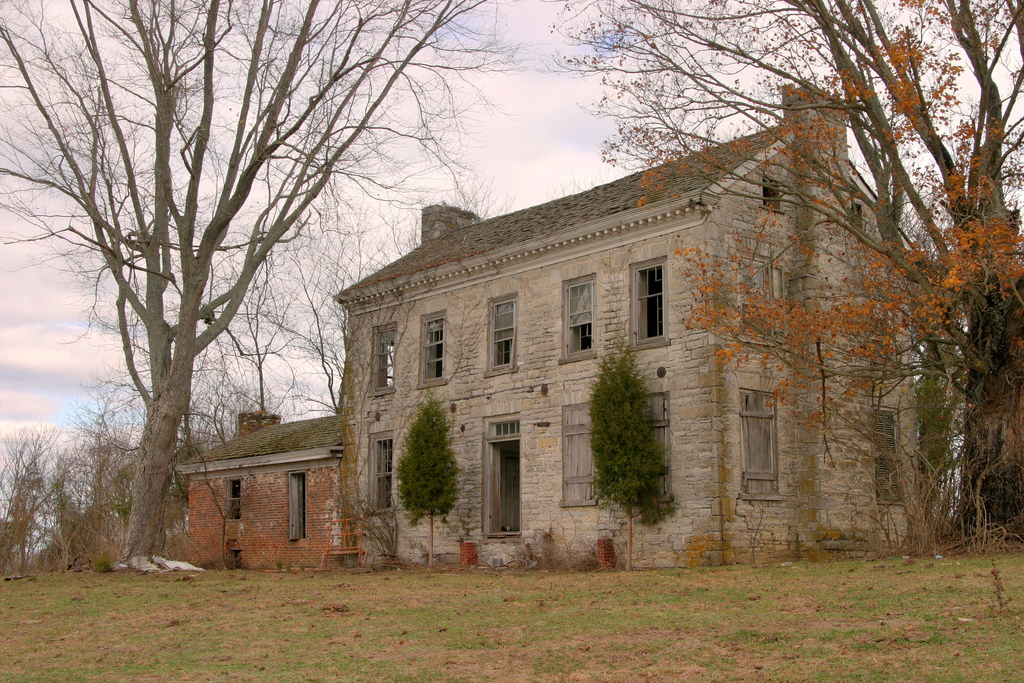
- Rural Mount in 2007

- Location within Tennessee Location within the United States
- Nearest city: Morristown, Tennessee
- Coordinates: 36°8′44″N 83°11′23″W
- Area: 9 acres (3.6 ha)
- Built: 1799
- Architectural style: Federal
- NRHP reference No.: 75001757
- Added to NRHP: July 30, 1975

Rural Mount is a historic mansion in Morristown, Tennessee, U.S.. It was built with ashlar stones circa 1799 by frontiersman Alexander Outlaw for his son-in-law, Joseph Hamilton. It was designed in the Federal architectural style. It has been listed on the National Register of Historic Places since July 30, 1975.
