= Western Carolinas =

The western Carolinas refers to:

- Western North Carolina
- Upstate South Carolina
