= Alexander Outlaw =

American frontiersman and politician (1738-1826)

Speaker of the Tennessee Senate
- In office 1799–1801
- Preceded by: William Blount
- Succeeded by: James White

Personal details
- Born: 1738 Duplin County, North Carolina
- Died: 1826 (aged 87–88) Dallas County, Alabama
- Spouse: Penelope (Smith) Outlaw

Military service
- Allegiance: United States
- Branch/service: Colonial and state militias
- Years of service: 1777, 1780s
- Rank: Colonel

Alexander Outlaw (1738–1826) was an American frontiersman and politician, active in the formation and early history of the state of Tennessee. A veteran of the American Revolutionary War, he settled on the Appalachian frontier, in what is now Jefferson County, Tennessee, in the early 1780s. He served simultaneously in the assembly of the failed State of Franklin as well as the legislature of its parent state, North Carolina. He was a delegate to the North Carolina convention that ratified the United States Constitution in 1789, and to the Tennessee state constitutional convention in 1796.

Outlaw represented Jefferson County in the Tennessee House of Representatives during the First General Assembly (1796). He represented Jefferson County in the Tennessee Senate during the Third General Assembly (1799–1801) and was elected Speaker. After his senate term, he focused primarily on land speculation and law. He died in Dallas County, Alabama, in 1826.

Rural Mount, a house built by Outlaw for his son-in-law, Joseph Hamilton, still stands near Morristown, Tennessee, and is listed on the National Register of Historic Places. Outlaw was the grandfather of U.S. Senator Alexander Outlaw Anderson.
