= American Enka Company =

Defunct American rayon fiber manufacturer

- Type: Public
- Industry: Rayon fiber production
- Founded: 1928; 98 years ago, Enka North Carolina, United States
- Founder: Jacques Coenraad Hartogs
- Defunct: 1985
- Fate: Acquired by BASF
- Headquarters: New York, New York, Asheville, North Carolina, United States
- Area served: Enka, North Carolina, Lowland, Tennessee,
- Key people: Rento Hofstede Crull; Claude Swanson Ramsey II; James E. Bostic II
- Products: Rayon fiber
- Number of employees: 3,000 (1940)
- Parent: BASF

The American Enka Company was an American company that was the nation's largest rayon fiber manufacturer. Founded in 1928, its research division developed such things as Tyrex (for the tire cord market), improved rayon and nylon, and by-products for detergent makers and paper mills. It helped bolster the economies of Western North Carolina, West Virginia, Eastern Kentucky, Eastern Tennessee, Northern Georgia and Northern Alabama during the Great Depression and thereafter; its founding in 1928 by Dutch capital led the way for German, Swiss, and British investments in the American South, and it was one of the companies on the original Fortune 500 list.

== Founding ==
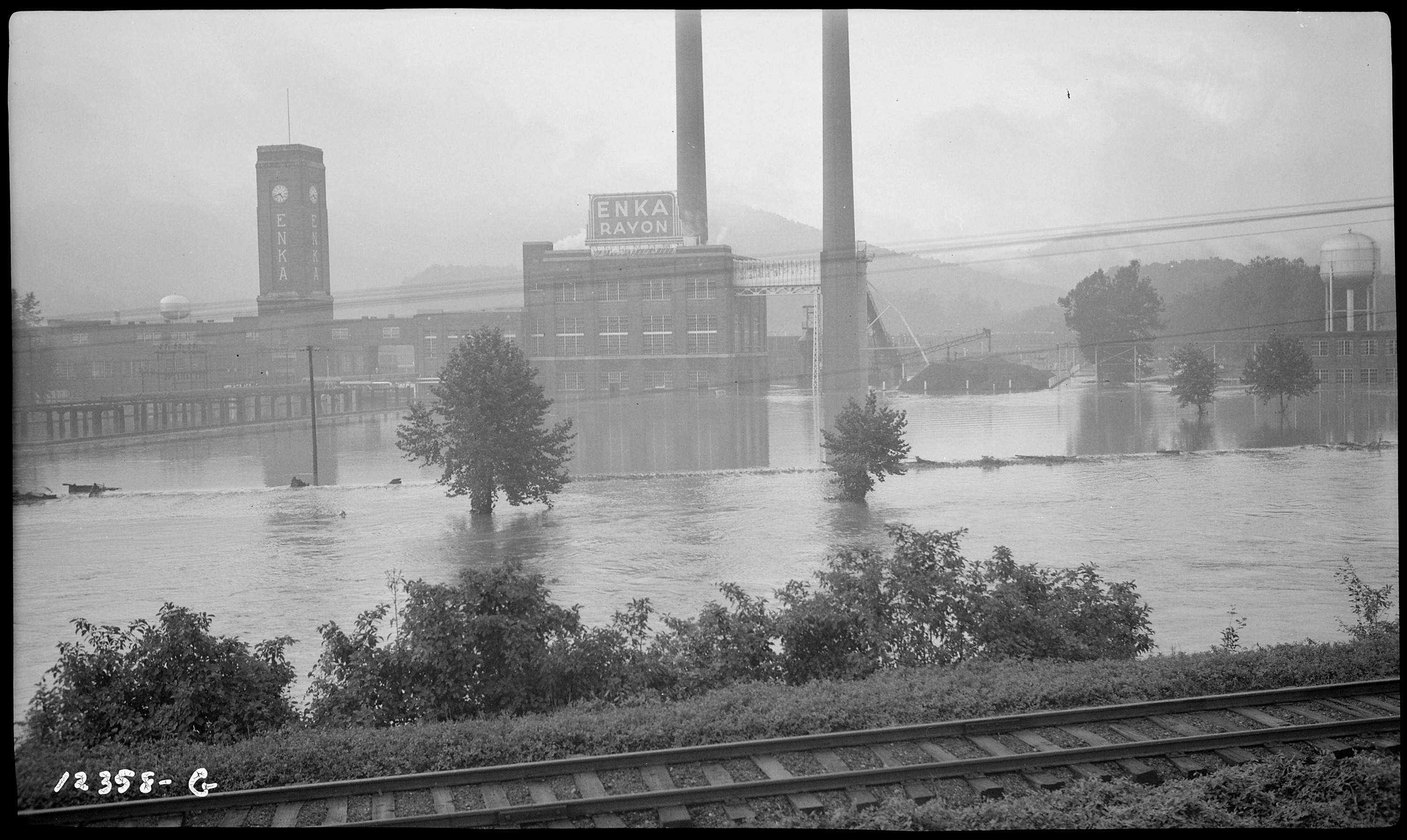
Enka plant outside of Asheville, North Carolina. Photo taken in 1940

The American Enka Company was established outside of Asheville, North Carolina, in late September 1928 by a Dutch firm, the Nederlandse Kunstzijdefabriek (Dutch Artificial Silk Company). The name is derived from the sound of N-K, the initial letters of the parent firm, spoken in Dutch.

The Netherlands' Nederlandse Kunstzijdefabriek was founded by Jacques Coenraad Hartogs shortly before World War I. By 1928, it had merged with several other Dutch and German firms, so that Business Week would subsequently describe it as a "giant international textile combine". Already in 1924, it looked toward expanding into the American marketplace. Simultaneously, it and other like manufacturers worldwide were experiencing difficulties with the manufacturing devices to make synthetic fibers because they easily and continually broke down.

The Nederlandse Kunstzijdefabriek (ENKA) was a member of the Dutch Chamber of Commerce's heavy industry division whose president at the time was Rento Hofstede Crull, the Dutch electrical pioneer who already had founded several companies. Hartogs and Hofstede Crull had become friends over the years; and Hartogs turned to him about the problem with the spinning devices. By May 1925, Hofstede Crull already had formulated a solution for the problem – Driving Device For A Centrifugal Spinning Machine and filed for patents in the Netherlands on May 6, 1925, and in the United States on May 3, 1926; thereafter it became fully patented in the United States on March 31, 1931. Thereafter, one of Hofstede Crull's companies, De Vijf and the Nederlandse Kunstzijdefabriek formed a joint venture, De Internationale Spinpot Exploitatie Maatschappij (ISEM) to manufacture and market Hofstede Crull's machines. This solution in the mid-twenties for the rayon manufacturing problem was the means for the Nederlandse Kunstzijdefabriek to enter the American market with its subsidiary, the American Enka Company in 1928 and with its creation thereby simultaneously circumventing trade protectionism (See AkzoNobel). Two years later, the American Enka Company would become a free standing one. With the death of Hofstede Crull in 1938, the ISEM was fully integrated with the AKU, the Algemene Kunstzijde Unie which had resulted when the German Vereinigte Glanzstoff-Fabriken merged with the Nederlandse Kunstzijdefabriek in 1929.

== The early years ==
Initially, the Dutch brought in technicians and workers from the Netherlands to supervise the creation of the physical plant and to train an American labor force the skills necessary for the manufacturing of rayon. Their success was quickly evident for in two years time they were able to turn the plant over to the ones they had taught so that they could return to the Netherlands. The American Enka (ENKA), thereby became an American entity run by Americans with an American labor force. The Dutch retained 56 per cent of the company's stock. By 1933, the American Enka rayon plant had experienced expansion and had 2,500 workers who were working a 40-hour week during a time when most areas in the United States were experiencing the throes of the Great Depression.

The ENKA's manufacturing needs also created economic opportunities for other industries: Its huge coal needs were met by the mining companies of eastern Kentucky, West Virginia, and southwest Virginia. Caprolactam, wood pulp, sulfuric acid, caustic soda and carbon disulfide needed for rayon production came from eastern Tennessee, Alabama, and Georgia. All of this positively impacted the business of the Southern Railway, now the Norfolk Southern, and the railroad industry generally, e.g., such as the need for specially built box cars to transport rayon nationwide. In the latter part of the 1930s, the ENKA began to produce a high-tenacity rayon yarn for automobile tires. This led to shipments of it which required large-scale commercial production.

In the 1930s, research found that 30% of American rayon workers suffered severe effects of carbon disulphide poisoning.

== The 1940s ==
Only twelve years after its origin in 1928, the ENKA employed 3,000 workers. In 1943, a multi-million dollars expansion occurred so it could produce an even more high-tenacity yarn for the Allied war effort, to be used for parachutes. On February 18, 1945, President Roosevelt signed executive order 9523 to authorize the Secretary of War to operate plants and facilities of the American Enka Corporation near Enka, North Carolina. Since its origin, it also experimented and produced other fibers for the textile industry. Construction for a second major plant began in 1944 and it was located in Lowland, Tennessee. The new rayon factory was fully operational by 1948.

== The American Enka and A Time When The Fabric Was Just As Important As The Designer, 1950s-1980s ==
Back in the 1930s, 1940s and early 1950, the American Enka was known for its superior rayon for it was used by everyone from Maurice Rentner to L'Aiglon and mentioned in advertisements appearing in periodicals such as Harper's Bazaar and Vogue. These also were teamed with high quality stores including Saks Fifth Avenue, Julius Garfinckel, Harzfeld's, Best & Co. Neiman-Marcus, Bloomingdale's, Bergdorf Goodman, Marshall Field's, I. Magnin, etc.

In 1953, the ENKA broke ground for a new nylon plant in Enka, North Carolina. A year later the ENKA became the first U.S. producer of fine denier Nylon 6. This had been developed earlier and independently by ENKA's Dutch parent company, the AKU, which had transferred the know-how to this U.S. manufacturer.

Like with its promotion of rayon, the ENKA relied on the same avenues to make the public aware of its superior nylon from the mid-1950s through the 1980s.

== The 1950s on: Research and Expansion ==
Research had always been emphasized ever since the ENKA had been founded in the United States. In the mid-1950s, a separate research center was constructed and it was enlarged in the early 1960s. This led to broadening the development of synthetic fiber. Already during the late thirties, the ENKA had begun a relationship with the textile research group at the National Bureau of Standards. When its director, Milton Harris, started the Harris Research Laboratories after World War II, his relationship with the American Enka Company continued and expanded. Others associated with ENKA's research over the years would also be honored with major honors in the fields of chemistry, polymer chemistry and textiles. Ralph McGregor would be the last to be honored with his receipt of the Louis Atwell Olney Medal (Louis Olney).

Attendant with this emphasis on research was the belief of having an educated work force. The American Enka supported a formal program of college education for its own work force in which its employees could participate in their spare time. A charitable trust had already been created in 1952 which provided such things as college scholarships. The American Enka Company also provided the means for local people to achieve in the company and outside of it. Two examples are Claude Swanson Ramsey, Jr., who began his career in the ENKA's industrial relations department and would over time become president of the company; and James E. Bostic, Jr., who would begin his career at the ENKA and go on to Washington, D.C., and then take on varied executive positions in the paper industry and serve on various boards as the first black director or trustee.

In the mid-1950s, the American Enka moved its headquarters from New York's Madison Avenue to the site of its Asheville campus. Expansion plans of it were announced in 1969 and the facility opened in 1970. By that time, the American Enka Company had ten plants around the country and about 11,000 employees nationwide. Also, it was then that Akzona, Inc. was created to serve as a holding company for the American Enka, International Salt Company, and Organon Inc.. Later, buildings were razed at Pack Square in downtown Asheville in 1979 so that the I. M. Pei designed Akzona headquarters could be built.

== Later years, acquisition by BASF, and legacy ==
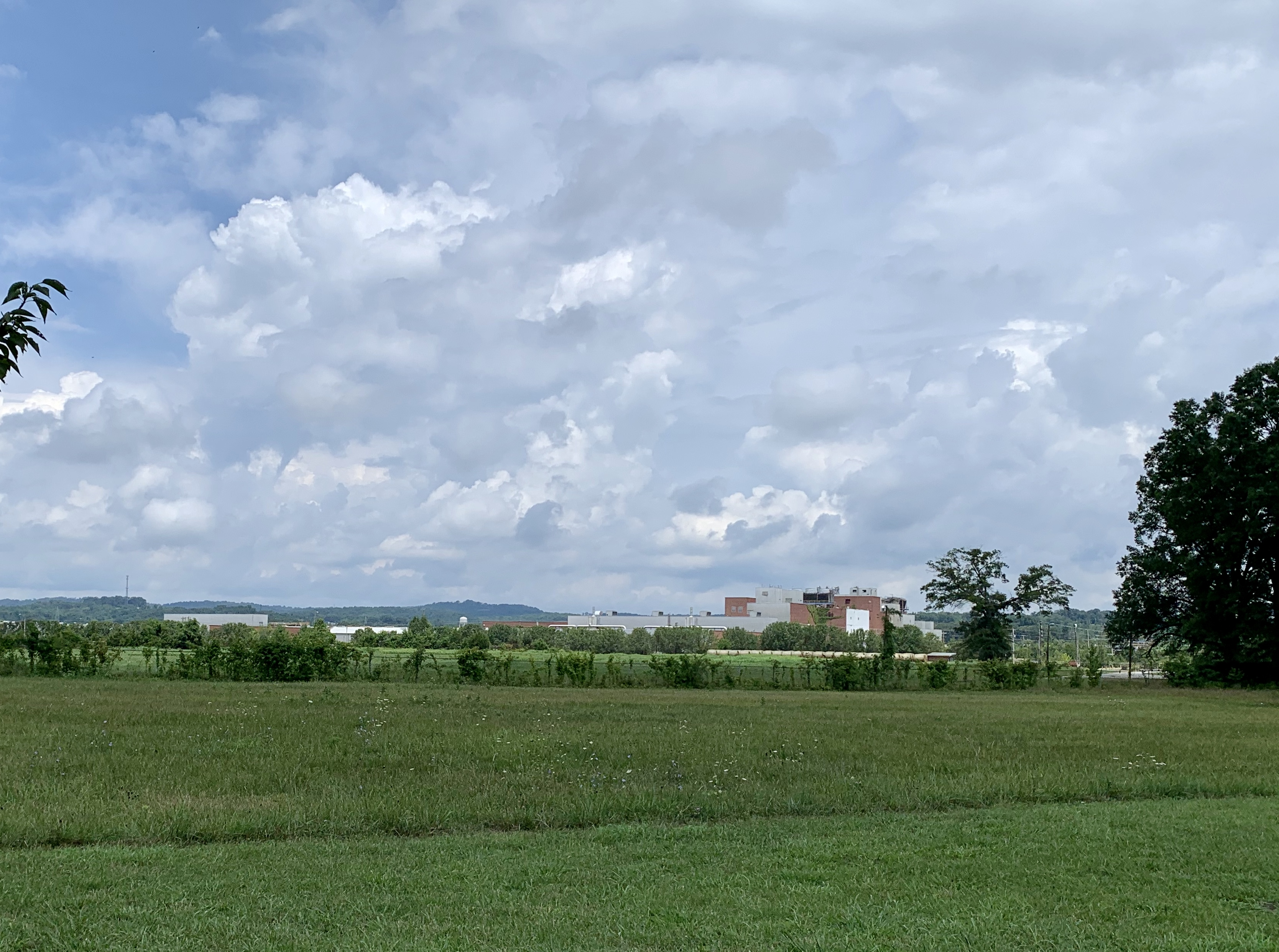
The former Enka plant site in Lowland, Tennessee

In the early 1980s, the American Enka began to restructure itself to remain competitive in the American marketplace because it was hard hit by imports from the Far East. Toward the end of 1985, the ENKA was purchased by the Badische Corporation; and its fibers operation combined with those of Badische's to form BASF Corporation Fibers Division.

During the mid-1990s AkzoNobel purchased back a portion of the BASF operation and it was named AkzoNobel Nonwovens. It began to produce a nonwoven named Colback which was/is used in carpet backing, automotive and industrial applications and Geosynthetics Products used in the building and environmental markets. After AkzoNobel's acquisition of Britain's Courtaulds Fibers in 1998, a new company was formed in 2000 that combined Courtaulds Fibers and AkzoNobel Nonwovens to successively become Colbond. Actually AkzoNobel divested all of its fibers division in 2000 to form a new company called Acordia based in Spondon, England, but its management was still located in Arnhem, Netherlands, home of AkzoNobel.

Today what began as the ENKA in Asheville, North Carolina, and the part that became Colbond with its overseas plants are now divisions of London, England-based Low & Bonar. Colbond, Inc., in Asheville is the only Low & Bonar holding in the United States. Plans were announced in 2008 to expand its Asheville Geosynthetics department. Some of the ENKA's manufacturing operations in the United States became part of Union Carbide, a Dow chemical subsidiary. Whatever ENKA manufacturing operations BASF still had in Asheville had been phased out in 2008 and moved to other manufacturing sites.
