= Hominy Creek (Georgia) =

- Location within Georgia Location within the United States

Physical characteristics
- Source
  - coordinates: 33.702608°N 84.9654982°W
- Mouth
  - coordinates: 33.6576088°N 85.0229996°W

Hominy Creek is a stream in the U.S. state of Georgia. It is a tributary to the Little Tallapoosa River.

The English-language name Hominy Creek most likely is the translation of an earlier Native American name.
