= Enka, North Carolina =

Unincorporated community in North Carolina, US

Coordinates: 35°32′59″N 82°39′00″W

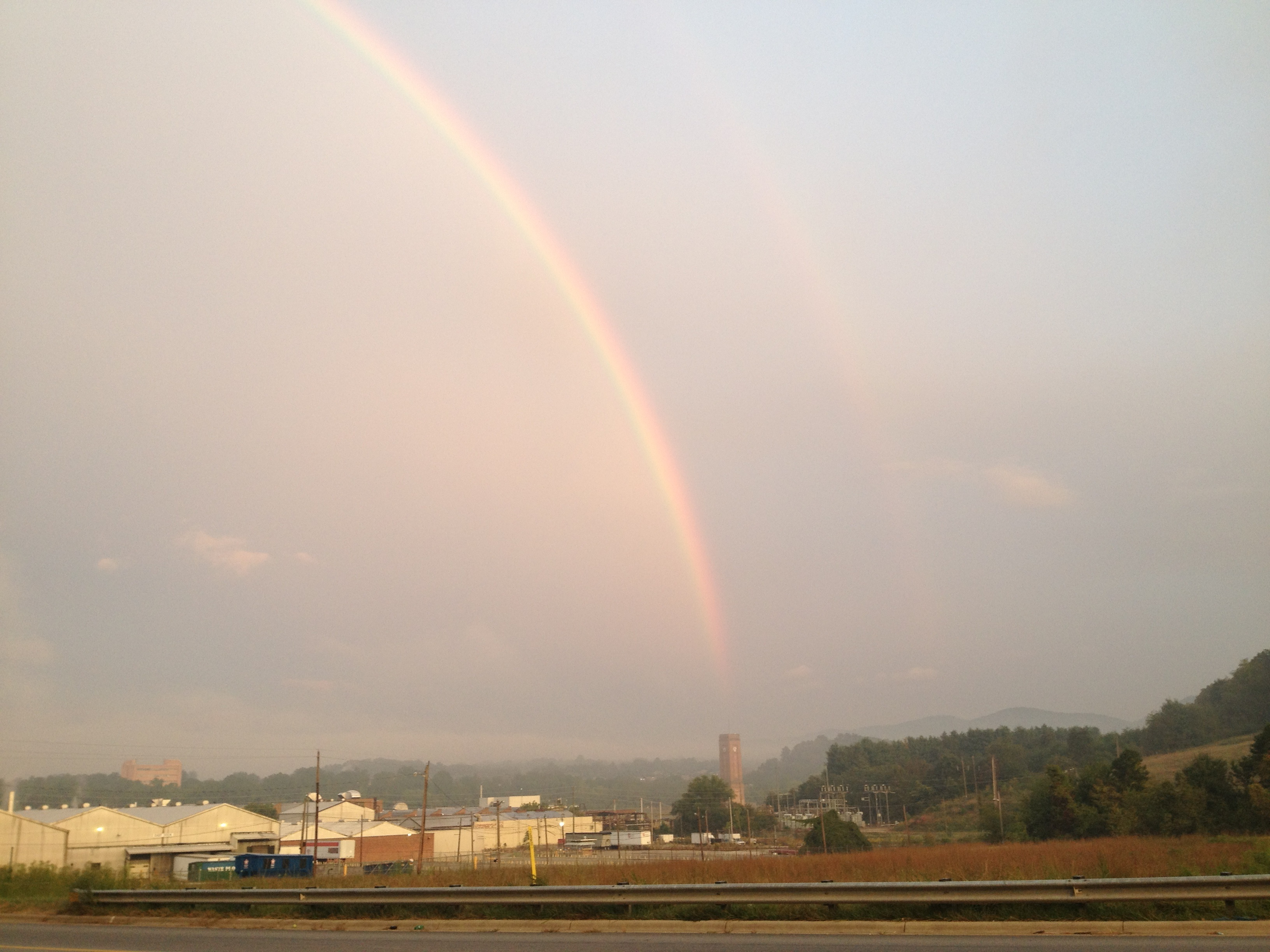
Enka plant's clock tower

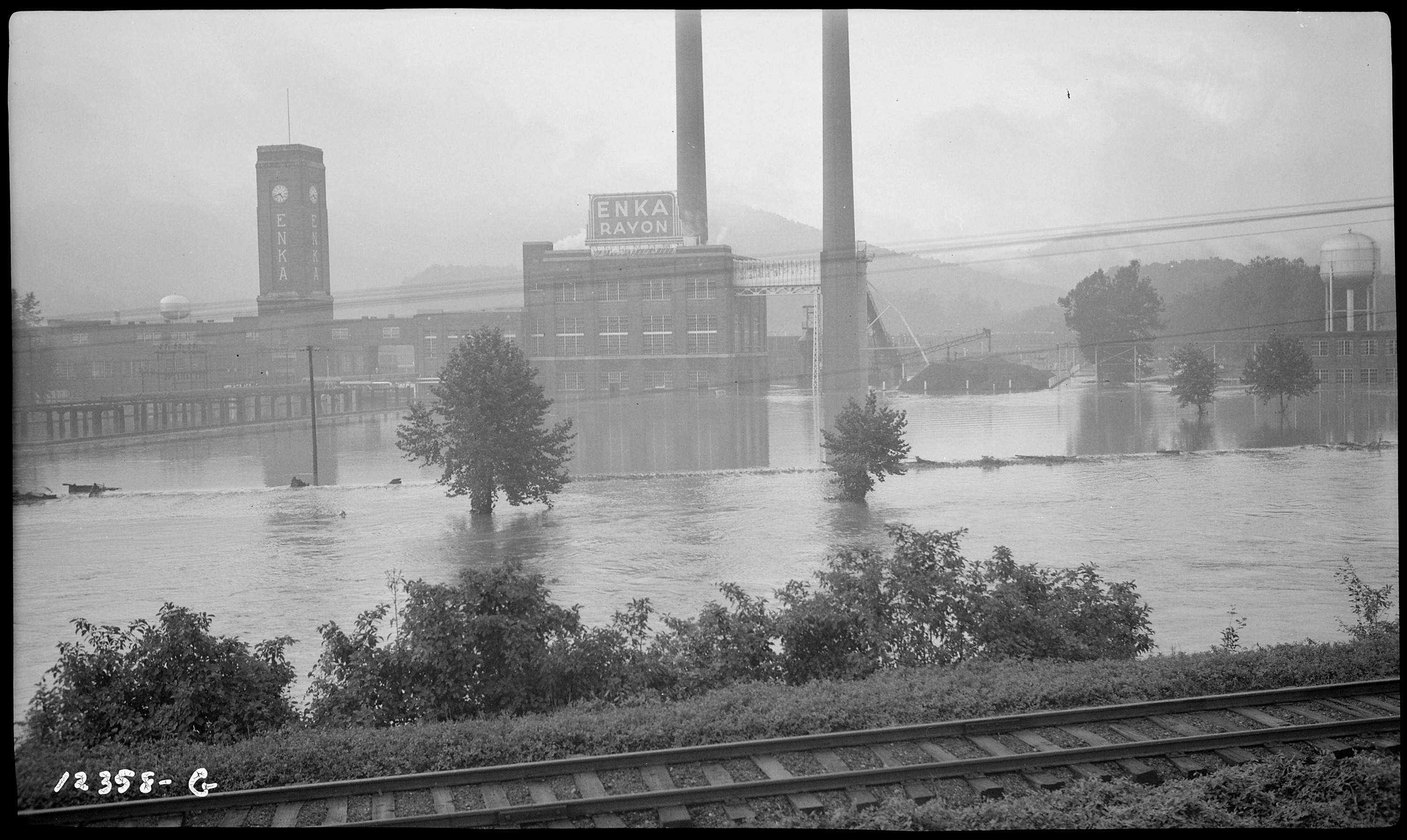
Enka plant in 1940

Enka is an unincorporated community in Buncombe County, North Carolina, United States. It lies on U.S. Routes 19, 23, and 74 Business near the interchange of Interstates 26, 40, and 240. It has a post office with the ZIP code 28728.

== History ==
=== American Enka ===
The American Enka Company, incorporated in 1928, became the nation's largest rayon producer. The Dutch name of the rayon company was Nederlandse Kunstzijdefabriek, and it is from the Dutch phonetic pronunciation of the initial letters N and K of the firm's name that "Enka" is derived. The alternative explanation that Enka stands for "Eerste Nederlandse Kunstzijdefabriek Arnhem" is incorrect. The Dutch company considered many sites and decided on the Hominy Valley because of its supply of water and labor. In 1929 the company began developing a community plan that included employee houses and became known as Enka Village. Enka Village is now a historic community and is part of the city of Asheville.

Fred Loring Seely, an Asheville businessman and son-in-law of Edwin Wiley Grove, builder of the Grove Park Inn, met several influential Dutch businessmen during his time in the Dutch colony of Java in 1901. Seely and his wife, Evelyn Grove Seely, had been sent to Java by Grove to secure a source for quinine which was used in Grove's chill tonic for malaria. When the Dutch rayon businessmen were searching for a site for an American-based factory in 1928, Seely served as a liaison to lure ENKA to build the rayon fiber factory in Buncombe County. He told the ENKA owners that his county could supply trees for fiber, water for processing, and reliable manpower. The thousands of jobs the plant created in western North Carolina in 1929 were a lifeline for many families. American Enka sent Seely over $1 million to buy 2000 acres, and ENKA built a $10 million plant. Nineteen hundred people worked there during the Great Depression, and that number grew to 4,300 after World War II. At one point, as many as 7,000 people worked there. Amenities included a gym, a pool room, a bowling alley, two cafeterias, and a library. Enka Lake Club opened on a lake built to supply the plant with water. Buses delivered employees from the surrounding area.

American Enka sold the plant to BASF in 1985. BASF sold the plant to Colbond Inc. in 2000, and as of 2007, rayon was no longer made. The northern section was sold to developers who tore down everything but the clock tower. Enka Lake is now part of the private Biltmore Lake community. Three buildings became the Enka campus of Asheville–Buncombe Technical Community College.

=== Redevelopment ===
Portions of the plant still stand, including a campus of Asheville-Buncombe Technical Community College. The remainder of the area includes offices, warehouses and industrial areas, open space, and a greenway follows along Hominy Creek.

Though as of 2015 about 200 people worked for Bonar Inc. making fabric for commercial carpet backing and more space was leased to ten other companies, most of the former plant is gone. Enka Intermediate School, built for about $25 million, opened nearby in August 2016 for fifth and sixth graders. It uses bricks salvaged from the plant and has a tower modeled on the factory's clock tower, and its sloped roofs recall the plant's sawtooth design.

Included in Enka Center will be a warehouse and distribution center to be built by Samet Corp., for which a proposal was considered by the Asheville city council in January 2021. Plans for a 600,000 sq. ft. industrial development with manufacturing facilities and warehouses were approved in January 2023, on the condition that the historic clock tower is preserved. The approval also called for seating around the tower, a historical marker, and easements for a county greenway. Samet planned to have the first building finished by the end of 2024, and two more buildings would follow on either side of the clock tower, which would get repairs.

In February 2026, Costco withdrew an earlier application for a store at the Enka Commerce Park; Mayor Esther Manheimer said the issues involved city requirements, conditions set by the property's seller and the state Department of Transportation. After the company resubmitted its plans, Asheville City Council voted unanimously on October 13, 2026, to rezone the site for the store. The council also agreed to lower the site's required tree canopy from 15 percent to 13 percent, which drew objections from some residents at the public hearing; Costco's attorney said the project would exceed the 15 percent standard if land outside the city limits were counted. Council member Kim Roney said the store would bring about 300 jobs.

== Education ==
Enka is served by Buncombe County Schools. Schools bearing the Enka name include Enka Intermediate School, Enka Middle School and Enka High School, all of which have Candler mailing addresses. Asheville–Buncombe Technical Community College operates its Enka campus in three former plant buildings.
