= Buncombe County Schools =

School district in North Carolina, United States

Location
- Buncombe County, North Carolina Western North Carolina United States

District information
- Type: Public
- Motto: Preparing students for their tomorrow.
- Grades: K-12
- Superintendent: Dr. Rob Jackson

Students and staff
- Students: As of March, 2017: 24,404
- Teachers: As of March, 2017: 1,650
- Staff: As of March, 2017: 3,752

Other information
- Website: www.buncombeschools.org

Buncombe County Schools (BCS) is the public school system overseeing education in Buncombe County, North Carolina, including parts of Asheville, North Carolina. The Buncombe County Schools system is the largest in Western North Carolina with almost 22,000 students enrolled in 47 schools and programs. In 2017, BCS ranked 16th in the United States and first in the state of North Carolina for the number of National Board Certified Teachers.

== Structure ==
There are seven members of the board of education who are elected to serve four-year terms and new members are elected every two years. One candidate is elected from each of the six electoral districts and one at-large. Candidates are elected on a nonpartisan basis. Voters in each district vote for candidates from all districts and for the at-large candidate. The superintendent is appointed by the board and serves as secretary to the board.

Rob Elliot of the Reynolds District serves as chair of the board of education. Dr. Rob Jackson has served the board of education as the school superintendent since 2022.

A separate entity from the board of education is the Buncombe County Schools Foundation. The foundation, which was founded in 1984, supports the schools and employees with volunteers and financial contributions.

This school system is divided into six districts: Enka, Erwin, North Buncombe, Owen, Reynolds, and Roberson. Within each school district, there is one high school, one or two middle schools, and three to five elementary schools. Some districts also host an intermediate school, serving grades 5–6; in these districts, the middle school serves grades 7 and 8.

The system offers several alternative education settings. At the high school level, Buncombe County Early College and Buncombe County Center for Career Innovation (BCCI) are housed on the campus of Asheville-Buncombe Technical Community College (A-B Tech). Early College allows students to earn a high school diploma and associate degree simultaneously, while BCCI confers a high school diploma and offers students the chance to join a skilled trade right out of high school. Meanwhile, Community High School in Swannanoa, NC provides an alternative education setting for at-risk students. The Buncombe County Schools Virtual Academy provides flexible, online learning opportunities for K-12 students who thrive outside a traditional classroom setting. The Progressive Education Program serves students with intellectual disabilities in age-appropriate settings at three sites: Estes Elementary, Valley Springs Middle School, and T.C. Roberson High School. Buncombe County Schools is also home to the Martin L. Nesbitt Jr. Discovery Academy, a science, technology, engineering, and math focused magnet high school that pulls students from all six Buncombe County Schools Districts. Martin L. Nesbitt Jr. Discovery Academy was the first high school of its kind in the region and is located at the Buncombe County Schools Central Office Building.

=== Board of education ===
- Ann B. Franklin - District 1
- Greg Cheatham - District 2
- Rob Elliot - Chair, District 3
- Amy Churchill - Vice-Chair, District 4
- Judy Lewis - District 5
- Kim Plemmons - District 6
- Rev. Charles Martin - At-Large

=== K-12 schools ===
- Buncombe County Schools Virtual Academy

=== High schools ===
- Enka High School
- Clyde A. Erwin High School
- North Buncombe High School
- Charles D. Owen High School
- A. C. Reynolds High School
- T. C. Roberson High School
- Community High School
- Buncombe County Early College
- Buncombe County Center for Career Innovation
- Martin L. Nesbitt Jr. Discovery Academy

=== Middle schools ===
- Enka Middle School
- Clyde A. Erwin Middle School
- North Buncombe Middle School
- Charles D. Owen Middle School
- A.C. Reynolds Middle School
- Cane Creek Middle School
- Valley Springs Middle School

=== Intermediate Schools ===
- Charles T. Koontz Intermediate School
- Enka Intermediate School
- Joe P. Eblen Intermediate School
- North Windy Ridge Intermediate School

=== Elementary schools ===
==== In the Enka District ====
Candler Elementary; Hominy Valley Elementary; Pisgah Elementary; Sand Hill-Venable Elementary.

==== In the Erwin District ====
Emma Elementary; Johnston Elementary; Leicester Elementary; West Buncombe Elementary; Woodfin Elementary.

==== In the North Buncombe District ====
Barnardsville Elementary; North Buncombe Elementary; Weaverville Elementary; Weaverville Primary.

==== In the Owen District ====
Black Mountain Elementary; Black Mountain Primary; W.D. Williams Elementary.

==== In the Reynolds District ====
Charles C. Bell Elementary; Fairview Elementary; Haw Creek Elementary; Oakley Elementary.

==== In the Roberson District ====
Avery's Creek Elementary; W. W. Estes Elementary; Glen Arden Elementary.
