= Hominy Creek (North Carolina) =

- Location within North Carolina Location within the United States

Physical characteristics
- Source
  - location: Canton, North Carolina
  - coordinates: 35.5306617°N 82.8326334°W
- Mouth
  - location: Asheville, North Carolina
  - coordinates: 35.5537227°N 82.5895702°W

Hominy Creek is a stream in the U.S. state of North Carolina. It is a tributary of the French Broad River.
